= 314th Fighter Squadron =

US Air Force unit

314th Fighter Squadron

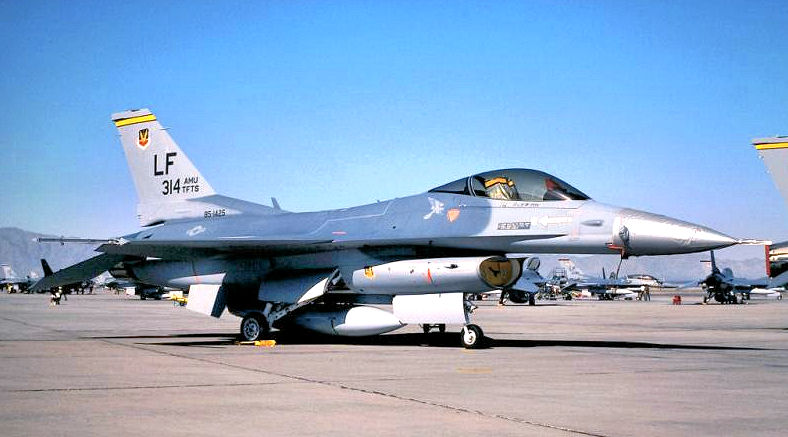
- 314th Tactical Fighter Training Squadron F-16C (Note: Aircraft is General Dynamics F-16C Fighting Falcon Block 25 serial 85-1425)
- Active: 1942–1945; 1986–1994: 2015–
- Country: United States
- Branch: United States Air Force
- Part of: Air Combat Command: Fifteenth Air Force; 49th Wing; 54th Fighter Group
- Nickname: Warhawks
- Engagements: Mediterranean Theater of Operations; European Theater of Operations
- Decorations: Distinguished Unit Citation; Air Force Outstanding Unit AwardFrench Croix de Guerre with Palm

Commanders
- Current commander: Lt Col John "Switch" Hamilton

Insignia
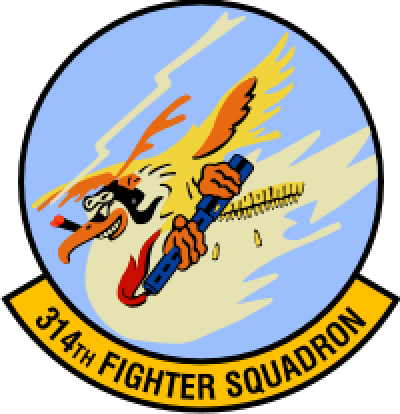
- 314th Fighter Squadron emblem (Approved 8 July 1944)

The 314th Fighter Squadron is an active United States Air Force unit. It is assigned to the 54th Fighter Group at Holloman Air Force Base, New Mexico, where it was activated on 6 July 2015.

The squadron was first activated during World War II. After training in the United States, it deployed to the Mediterranean Theater of Operations, where it flew combat missions with Ninth Air Force, then with Twelfth Air Force, advancing into Italy, France and Germany. It was awarded the Distinguished Unit Citation and French Croix de Guerre with Palm for its actions. It returned to the United States in November 1945 and was inactivated.

The squadron was again activated as the 314th Tactical Fighter Training Squadron at Luke Air Force Base, Arizona in 1986 and conducted training in the General Dynamics F-16 Fighting Falcon until inactivating in 1994.

== History ==
=== World War II ===
The squadron was established as a Curtiss P-40 Warhawk fighter squadron under I Fighter Command in the summer of 1942. It trained in the Northeastern United States until October, then deployed to serve with Ninth Air Force in Egypt, where it took part in the Western Desert Campaign. The unit trained for several weeks Royal Air Force units, then began operating with other organizations against the enemy in Tunisia. The squadron engaged primarily in escort and patrol missions between Tunisia and Sicily until July 1943.

The 314th trained from July to October 1943 for operations with Twelfth Air Force. It resumed combat on 30 October 1943 and directed most of its attacks against roads, bridges, motor transport, supply areas, rolling stock, gun positions, troop concentrations, and rail facilities in Italy until August 1944. The squadron patrolled the beach and protected convoys during the assault on Anzio in January 1944. It aided the Allied offensive in Italy during May 1944, receiving a Distinguished Unit Citation for action from 12 to 14 May when the squadron bombed an enemy position on Monastery Hill 9 (Monte Cassino), attacked troops massing on the hill for counterattack, and hit a nearby stronghold to force the surrender of an enemy garrison.

The squadron continued to give close support to ground forces until the fall of Rome in June 1944. It then converted to Republic P-47 Thunderbolts in July and supported the assault on southern France in August by dive-bombing gun positions, bridges, and radar facilities, and by patrolling the combat zone. It gave tactical support to Allied forces advancing through France. The squadron aided the reduction of the Colmar bridgehead in January and February 1945, and supported Seventh Army's drive through the Siegfried Line defenses in March 1945.

The 314th became part of the occupation forces in Germany after war in Europe ended in May. It returned to the United States and was inactivated 7 November 1945 with its group at Camp Shanks, New York.

=== Second era ===
The squadron was reactivated by Tactical Air Command as the 314th Tactical Fighter Training Squadron in 1986 as the second F-16C/D replacement training unit. This made the 314th the fourth and last flying squadron under the 58th Tactical Training Wing. It was initially equipped with new "Block 25" Falcons, but converted to new "Block 42"s in 1990. Its aircraft carried the "LF" tail code, with a yellow tail stripe outlined in red. On 1 October 1991 the squadron was redesignated the 314th Fighter Squadron and was assigned to the 58th Operations Group. On 1 April 1994 the 314th was inactivated and its personnel and equipment were transferred to the 61st Fighter Squadron, which moved on paper to Luke from MacDill Air Force Base.

=== Modern era ===
The 314th Fighter Squadron was reactivated by the Air Education and Training Command. A unique setup, detached from Luke Air Force Base, 56th Fighter Wing, it is the second Block 42 F-16C formal training unit in the 54th Fighter Group at Holloman Air Force Base officially in 2015.

On 25 November 2015, a 314th Fighter Squadron F-16 crashed near Salinas Peak near Truth or Consequences, New Mexico. The pilot was in good condition when he was found.

== Lineage ==
- Constituted as the 314th Fighter Squadron on 24 June 1942

Activated on 6 July 1942

- Redesignated 314th Fighter Squadron, Single Engine c. 1 May 1944

Inactivated on 7 November 1945

- Redesignated 314th Tactical Fighter Training Squadron and activated on 1 October 1986

Redesignated 314th Fighter Squadron on 1 November 1991
Inactivated on 1 April 1994
Activated on 6 July 2015

=== Assignments ===
- 324th Fighter Group, 6 July 1942 – 7 November 1945 (attached to 57th Fighter Group, 8 March – 23 May 1943)
- 58th Tactical Training Wing, 1 October 1986
- 58th Operations Group, 1 October 1991 – 1 April 1994
- 54th Fighter Group, 6 July 2015

=== Stations ===
- Mitchel Field, New York, 6 July 1942
- Baltimore Airport, Maryland, 6 July – 28 October 1942
- RAF El Amiriya (LG 29), Egypt, 23 December 1942
- RAF Kabrit, Egypt, 2 February 1943
- Darragh Airfield, Libya, 8 March 1943
- Ben Gardane Airfield, Tunisia, 14 April 1943
- El Haouaria Airfield, Tunisia, c. 18 June 1943
- Menzel Heurr Airfield, Tunisia, 3 October 1943
- Cercola Airfield, Italy, 25 October 1943
- Pignataro Maggiore Airfield, Italy, 6 May 1944
- Le Banca Airfield, Italy, 6 June 1944
- Montalto Di Castro Airfield, Italy, 13 June 1944
- Ghisonaccia Airfield, Corsica, 15 July 1944
- Le Luc Airfield, France, 23 August 1944
- Istres Airfield (Y-17), France, 1 September 1944
- Amberieu Airfield (Y-5), France, 5 September 1944
- Dôle-Tavaux Airfield (Y-7), France, 17 September 1944
- Luneville Airfield (Y-2), France, 2 January 1945
- AAF Station Stuttgart/Echterdingen (R-50), Germany, 3 May – 20 October 1945
- Camp Shanks, NY, 6–7 November 1945
- Luke Air Force Base, Arizona, 1 October 1986 – 1 April 1994
- Holloman Air Force Base, New Mexico, 14 July 2015 – present

=== Aircraft ===
- Curtiss P-40 Warhawk, 1942–1944
- Republic P-47 Thunderbolt, 1944–1945
- General Dynamics F-16C Fighting Falcon, 1986–1994, 2015
