= 316th Fighter Squadron =

United States Air Force unit

316th Fighter Squadron

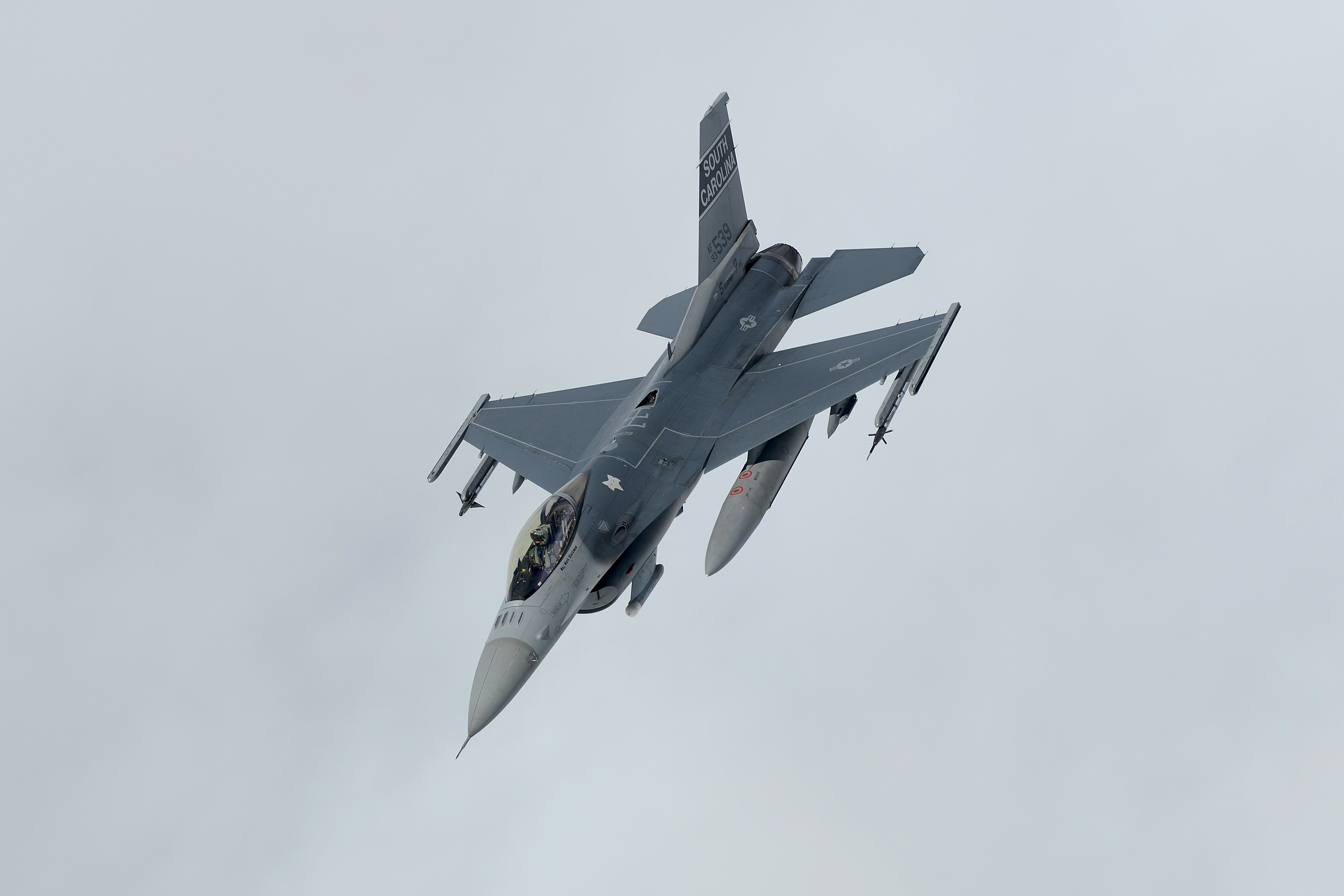
- An F-16 Fighting Falcon of the South Carolina Air National Guard, the squadron's associate, in 2015
- Active: 1942–1945; 2015–present
- Country: United States
- Branch: United States Air Force
- Role: Fighter
- Part of: Air Combat Command
- Garrison/HQ: McEntire Joint National Guard Base, South Carolina
- Engagements: World War II – EAME Theater

- Decorations: Distinguished Unit Citation (2x)

Insignia
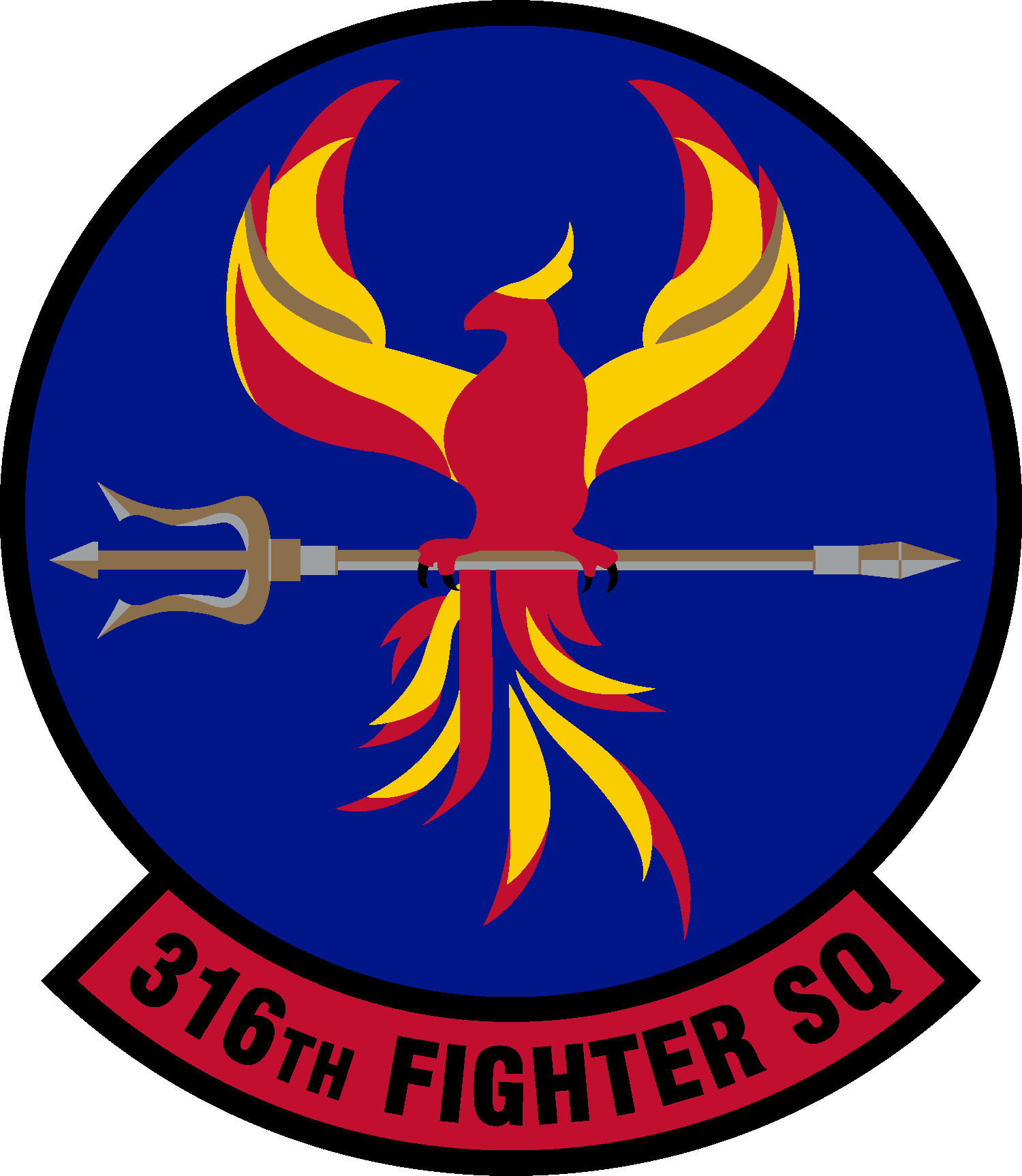
- 316th Fighter Squadron emblem (Note: Approved 23 June 2023.)

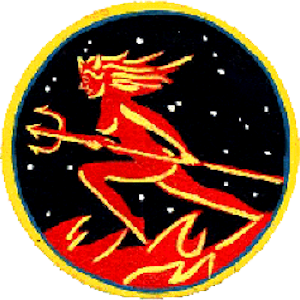
- World War II 316th Fighter Squadron emblem (Note: Approved 2 September 1943. Description; On a black disc, border orange, piped light blue, a she-devil red, highlighted yellow, hair flammant, horns white, leaping from flames red, orange and yellow in base, and grasping a white trident held diagonally across body, point to dexter chief.)

The 316th Fighter Squadron is an active unit of the United States Air Force, assigned to the 495th Fighter Group, and stationed at McEntire Joint National Guard Base, South Carolina. The unit was most recently activated in 2015 as an active associate of the South Carolina Air National Guard's 169th Fighter Wing.

Previously, the squadron served from 1942 to 1945 during World War II, where it took part in the North African campaign and fought in the European theater of World War II.

== History ==
The 316th Fighter Squadron was activated in mid-1942 under I Fighter Command at Mitchel Field, New York as one of the original squadrons of the 324th Fighter Group. The squadron trained at Byrd Field, Virginia. The first three and a half months were spent in training, and the men of the 316th absorbed the various techniques of aerial combat.

On 9 October overseas shipment orders arrived, and on the 27th the men boarded a train in Norfolk and arrived at Camp Kilmer, New Jersey the next day. The air echelon had left earlier for Miami Army Air Field, Florida, and were later flown by easy stages along the South Atlantic Air Transport Route via the Caribbean and Brazil to the squadron's destination – North Africa and the Ninth Air Force.

On Halloween day 1942 the ground echelon boarded the USS West Point, formerly the luxury liner America, which left New York early on 1 November. The squadron was berthed on the lowest deck, promptly tagged "Torpedo Junction" by some wag, and the men settled down to days of sickness and boredom. The monotony was somewhat relieved by the sight of Rio de Janeiro, Brazil, but no one was allowed ashore. On 12 November the West Point left Rio for the long haul to India, arriving at Bombay on 2 December. The squadron's equipment was unloaded, and the men were put on a train and sent to British Army rest camp at Deolali, India. They spent several days there stretching their "sea legs" in preparation for the next phase of the trip. The cleanliness and luxury of Deolali was a welcome respite from the crowded conditions common to troopships. On 13 December the 316th boarded HMS Denera, and three days later the men disembarked in Egypt. By 23 December the squadron was at RAF El Amiriya (Landing Ground LG-174), Egypt, and a period of training under combat-wise Royal Air Force supervisors followed.

=== Western Desert Campaign ===
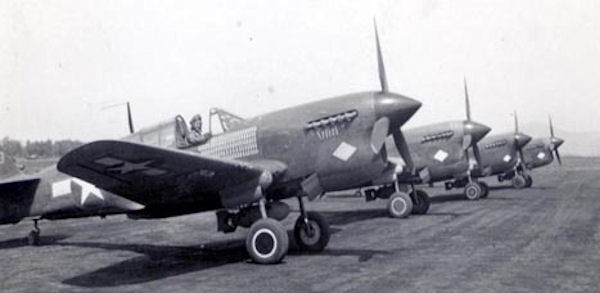
P-40 Warhawks of the 316th Fighter Squadron in North Africa, 1943

The great offensive to oust the Nazis from Africa had begun with the English assault on Rommel's Afrika Korps at El Alamein on 23 October. The 316th was assigned to help the British advance, but it was not until 15 March that its pilots were deemed ready for combat. The day before the squadron went into action it was transferred to Causeway Landing Ground, Tunisia and attached to the 79th Fighter Group, and they flew several missions under their tutelage before being allowed to operate as an independent organization.

The British Eighth Army began its final assault on the German Mareth Line (on the border of Tunisia and Tripoli) on 20 March, and six days later the 316th received its baptism of fire while supporting the offensive. The squadron's Curtiss P-40 Warhawks attacked an intersection near El Hamma, leaving six enemy vehicles burning on the road. Despite heavy ack-ack all aircraft returned safely with the exception of Major Frederick G. Delaney Jr's (the squadron commander). Because of leg wounds, he was forced to land at an English field near the front; and unfortunately, he never returned to the squadron. The unit flew mainly ground support missions during the remainder of the Tunisian campaign, but it also mounted armed reconnaissance, counter-air, bomber escort, and destroyer cover operations in that period. On 8 May the squadron bagged its first kill in aerial combat. A flight was returning from a dive bombing mission over the rapidly shrinking enemy bridgehead in Africa when the pilots saw three Messerschmitt Bf 109s dive from out of the sun on the flight Leader, Captain Robert C. Dempsey. The Germans had the bad luck not to spot the rest of the flight, and when they turned to get Captain Dempsey they were pounced on by fourteen fighters. Two of the enemy planes turned tail and escaped, but one went down in flames. On 11 May the Tunisian campaign ended.

=== Sicily Campaign ===
On 2 June the squadron was transferred to El Haouaria Airfield, Tunisia in order to rejoin its parent, the 324th Fighter Group, and for several weeks rested from the rigors of campaigning. The 316th resumed bombing escort operations during July. Preparations for Operation Husky, the invasion of Sicily were underway, and 10 July was designated as D-Day. The squadron was assigned the task of helping provide air cover for the invasion.

On 9 July, while it was providing top cover for a group of Douglas A-20 Havoc light bombers, a formation of squadron planes was jumped by over fifty Bf 109s. The sky was soon filled with dog fights. The 316th bore the brunt of the attack when its planes attempted to draw the enemy away from the bombers. The pilots put into play the P-40's two greatest assets, firepower and maneuverability, and dueled with the Germans for over ten minutes. The sky was filled with exploding planes, floating parachutes, fluttering shreds of wings and tails, streaks of oily smoke, and the criss-cross of tracers. The enemy could not stand this defense and turned for home. The trim P-40's streaked or limped, according to combat results, back to Tunisia and the 316th found that it had destroyed eight German planes during the action.

On invasion day the squadron, along with the rest of the 324th group, put the first American fighters over the beachhead, and the unit continued to provide air cover and close support until the Allied grip on the island was assured. Although its home base remained in Africa, the 316th flew many missions from a primitive airfield only recently captured from the enemy. Many night landings were made on ill-equipped and ill-lit field, but there were no accidents involving the squadron. At the end of the Sicilian campaign the entire group was transferred to Twelfth Air Force, and the pilots received a brief respite from combat. The 316th was given the job of training newly arrived pilots in all the subtleties of combat. The men began to chafe under this mundane unexciting duty, and they welcomed orders alerting the squadron for transfer to Italy.

=== Italian Campaign ===
On 27 October part of the unit left for Italy, but it was not until 7 November that it was fully operational at Cercola Airfield. By mid-November the skies brightened and the squadron was able to press home its attacks. Its primary role became the close support of Fifth Army ground troops. On 10 May 1944 the squadron moved a few miles closer to Rome when it shifted operations to Pignataro Maggiore Airfield. The final phase of the Rome-Arno campaign opened that month with the American Fifth and British Eighth Armies driving up both sides of the Italian "boot". The Germans had heavily fortified the little town of Castellonorato, but surrendered without firing a shot after attacks by the 324th group. The group received a Presidential Unit Citation for these raids.

On 7 June 1944, just after Rome fell, the squadron moved to La Banca, near Anzio, where their brief stay was highlighted by night bombing by a lone German aircraft. On 19 July the Squadron was temporarily withdrawn from combat in order to switch from P-40s to Republic P-47D Thunderbolts. The unit left Italy on 18 July, and by the 19th it was operating out of an airfield near Ghisonaccia, Corsica, flying armed reconnaissance sweeps over southern France; patrolling the coasts; and escorting medium bombers of the Twelfth Air Force.

=== Invasion of Southern France ===
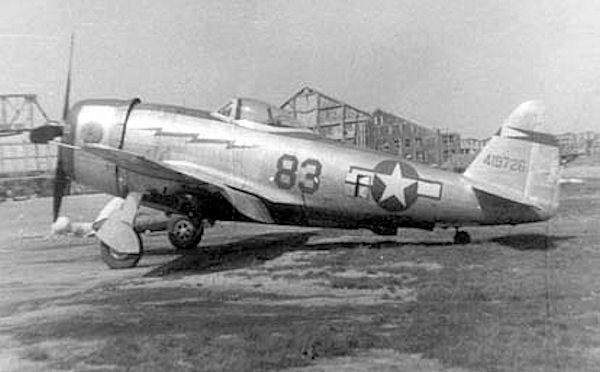
316th Fighter Squadron Republic P-47D-30-RA Thunderbolt, AAF Ser. No. 44-19726.

On 15 August the Invasion of Southern France was made on the French Rivera, and the 316th mounted many missions against radar installations near the invasion beaches. On D-Day the squadron helped maintain fighter cover over the invading troops, and several troublesome strong points were eliminated by the unit's planes. On 21 August a small party of the 316th went ashore in southern France after a three-day ride on an LST, and they immediately began preparing the captured field at Le Luc Airport for the arrival of the squadron's planes. After only two days at Le Luc the squadron moved to Istres/Le Tubé Airfield, and on 5 September the ground echelon left for Amberieu Airfield by truck. On 17 September the unit moved to Dole/Tavaux Airfield. The squadron found Tavaux comparatively luxurious, especially when the monotonous diet of C-rations ended as the supply columns finally caught up with the front.

The German counterattack in the Ardennes occurred in mid-December, and the squadron moved northward to Luneville Airfield, France, on 2 January 1945 to help blunt the enemy thrust. On 5 January the squadron was operating from the Luneville strip. Throughout January and February the 316th's fighters flew close support missions and launched interdiction attacks against the enemy in the Ardennes salient. Intense cold, frequent snow storms, and a lack of supplies severely hampered operations during the winter, but the squadron performed invaluable service in helping turn the German attack into a disastrous defeat.

=== Western Allied Invasion of Germany ===
On 15 March the Seventh Army began its final offensive, and the squadron was up at the light of day to help support the attack. During the drive the 316th flew several missions a day in support of troops which were smashing their way through the Siegfried Line. On 14 April the squadron played a great part in the destruction of an enemy convoy, containing an estimated 500 vehicles that had become stalled about 15 miles northeast of Nuremberg. When the Thunderbolts finally departed they left a highway filled with destroyed transport and dead enemy troops. It was believed that the enemy convoy had been trying to escape an armored thrust further north of Nuremberg, but they only succeeded in being "blitzed" from the air.

On 3 May the flight echelon moved to AAF Station Stuttgart/Echterdingen, Germany, in the wake of the advancing Sixth Army Group, but the ground crews did not reach the new base until V-E Day, 8 May 1945.

The squadron became part of the United States Air Forces Europe army of occupation. It returned to the United States and was inactivated 7 November 1945 with its group at Camp Shanks, New York.

=== Active Duty Associate Unit ===
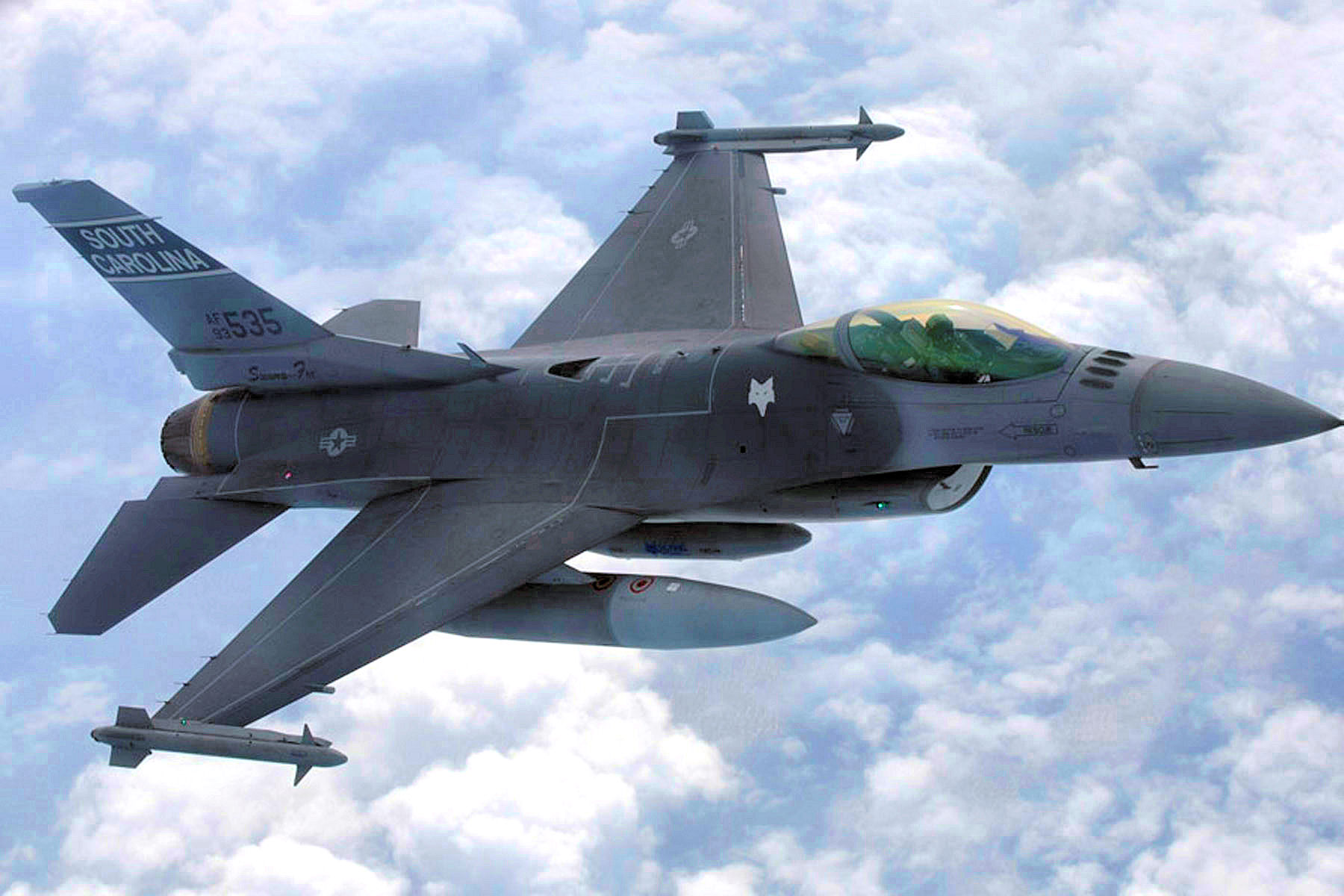
169th Fighter Wing F-16CJ, AF Ser. No. 93-0535, flown by the 316th Fighter Squadron

On 2 October 2015, the 316th Fighter Squadron was reactivated as part of the 495th Fighter Group at Shaw Air Force Base, South Carolina. As a Regular Air Force Active Associate unit, the 316 FS is embedded in the South Carolina Air National Guard's 169th Fighter Wing at nearby McEntire Joint National Guard Base, sharing the same F-16CJ/DJ Block 52 aircraft.

== Lineage ==
- Constituted as the 316th Fighter Squadron on 24 June 1942

Activated on 6 July 1942
Inactivated on 7 November 1945

- Activated on 2 October 2015

=== Assignments ===
- 324th Fighter Group, 6 July 1942 – 7 November 1945 (attached to 79th Fighter Group, 15 March 1943 – 21 May 1943)
- 495th Fighter Group, 2 October 2015 – present

=== Stations ===
- Mitchel Field, New York, 6 July 1942
- Byrd Field, Virginia, 6 July 1942 – 28 October 1942
- RAF El Amiriya (LG-174), Egypt, 23 December 1942
- RAF Kabrit, Egypt, 3 February 1943
- Libya, 15 March 1943 (undetermined locations)
- Causeway Landing Ground, Tunisia, April 1943
- Kairouan Airfield, Tunisia, 2 June 1943
- El Haouaria Airfield, Tunisia, c. 18 June 1943
- Menzel Heurr Airfield, Tunisia, 3 October 1943
- Cercola Airfield, Italy, 27 October 1943
- Pignataro Maggiore Airfield, Italy, 10 May 1944
- Le Banca Airfield, Italy, 7 June 1944
- Montalto Di Castro Airfield, Italy, 15 June 1944
- Ghisonaccia, Corsica, 19 July 1944
- Le Luc Airport, France, 29 August 1944
- Istres/Le Tubé Airfield (A-17), France, 3 September 1944
- Amberieu Airfield (Y-5), France, 6 September 1944
- Dole/Tavaux Airfield (Y-7), France, 20 September 1944
- Luneville Airfield (Y-2), France, 2 January 1945
- Flughafen Stuttgart (later AAF Station Stuttgart/Echterdingen, Germany, 3 May 1945 – 20 October 1945
- Camp Shanks, New York, 6–7 November 1945
- McEntire Joint National Guard Base, South Carolina, 2 October 2015

=== Aircraft ===
- Curtiss P-40 Warhawk, 1942–1944
- Republic P-47 Thunderbolt, 1944–1945
- Lockheed Martin F-16 Fighting Falcon, 2015–present
