= 315th Fighter Squadron =

315th Fighter Squadron

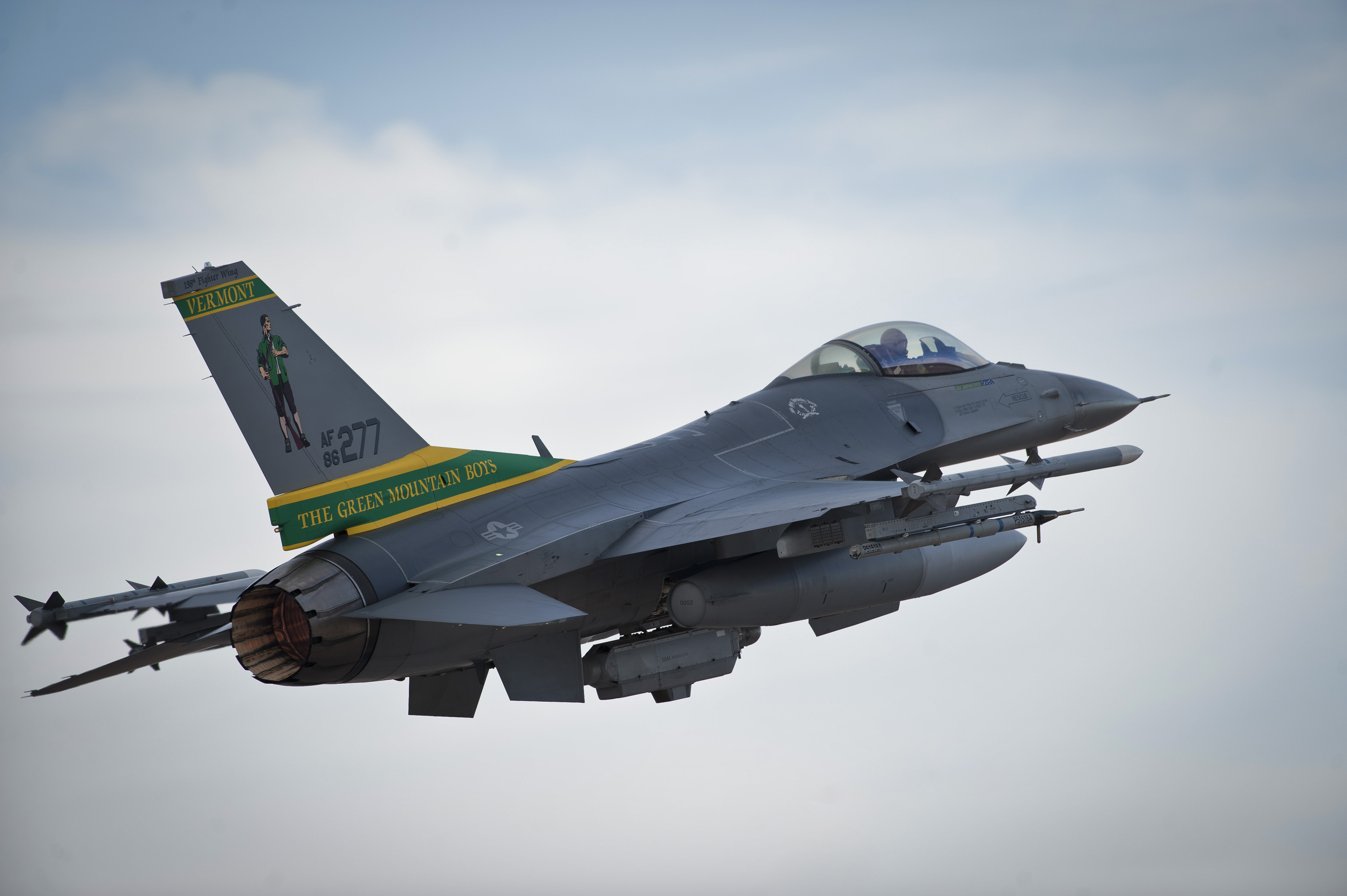
- A Vermont Air National Guard F-16 Fighting Falcon at Exercise Red Flag
- Active: 1942–1945; 2016–present
- Country: United States
- Branch: United States Air Force
- Role: Fighter
- Part of: Air Combat Command
- Garrison/HQ: Burlington International Airport
- Engagements: Mediterranean Theater of Operations; European Theater of Operations
- Decorations: Distinguished Unit Citation; French Croix de Guerre with Palm

Insignia
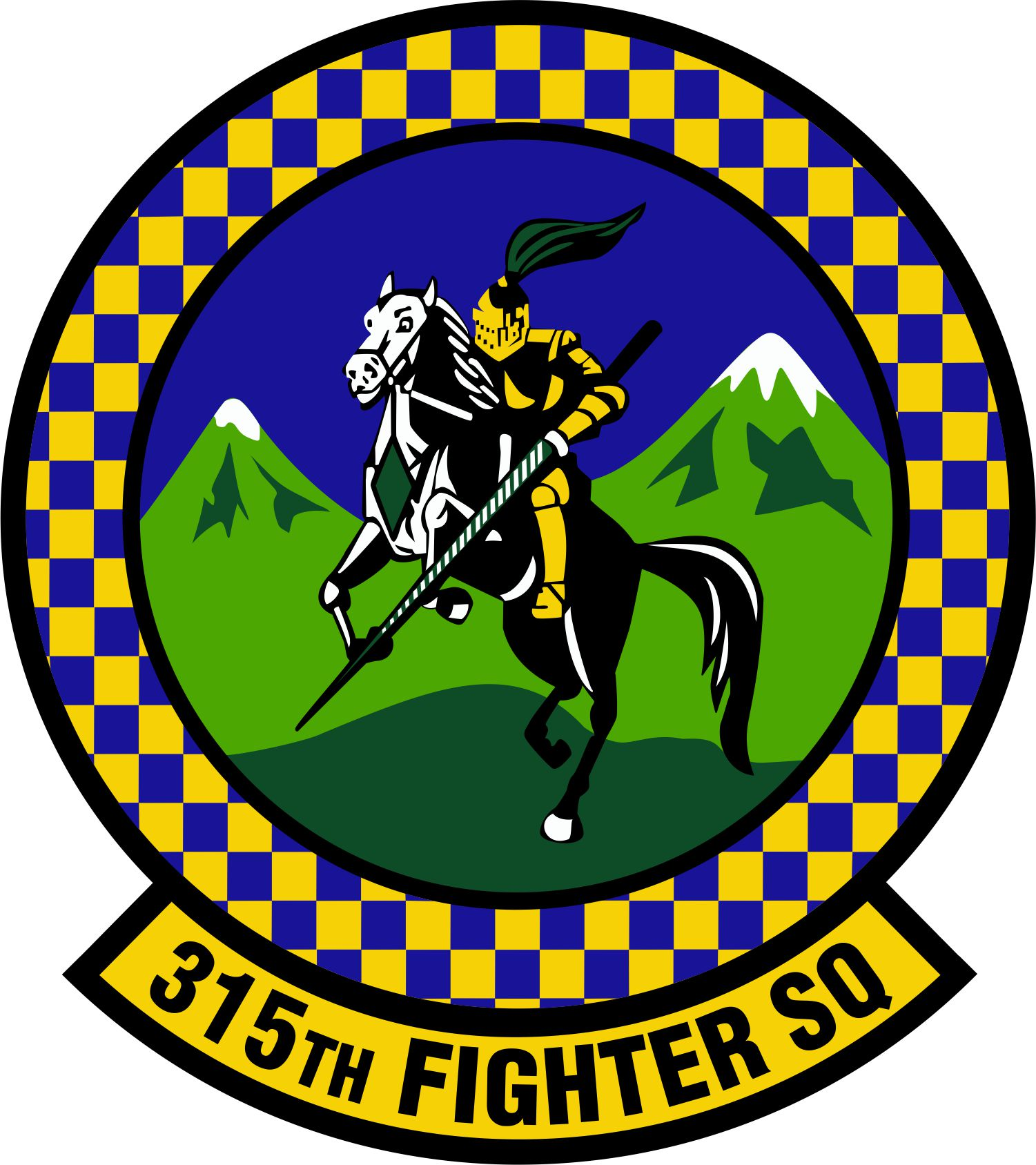
- 315th Fighter Squadron emblem (Note: Approved 17 October 2016.)

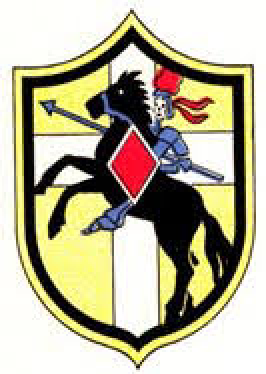
- 315th Fighter Sq emblem (Note: Used from 1943 to 1945. In March 1943, the squadron commander decided that an emblem based on a cartoon did not reflect the seriousness of the squadron's combat mission and had it replaced.)

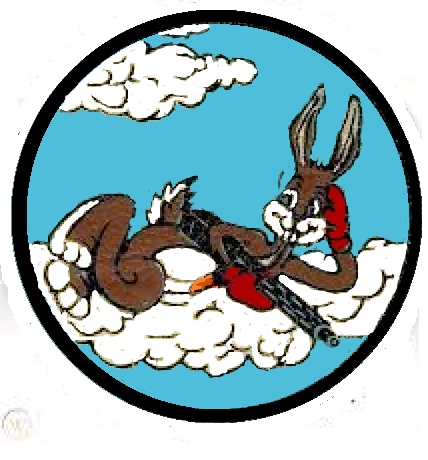
- 315th Fighter Sq emblem (Note: used from 1942 to 1943.)

The 315th Fighter Squadron is an active squadron of the United States Air Force. It is an active associate fighter squadron assigned to the 495th Fighter Group and integrated into the 158th Fighter Wing, Vermont Air National Guard. It was activated in 2016 in Burlington, Vermont. Prior to that it was last active at Camp Shanks, New York, in November 1945.

The unit was activated in July 1942 as one of the three squadrons of the 324th Fighter Group. After training in the United States, it moved to Egypt in July 1942 and engaged in combat in the Mediterranean Theater of Operations, moving to France following the invasion of southern France. It received two Distinguished Unit Citations and the French Croix de Guerre with Palm for its combat actions. Following the surrender of Germany, the 315th remained in Germany as part of the occupation forces until the fall of 1945, when it returned to the United States and was inactivated.

== History ==
=== World War II ===
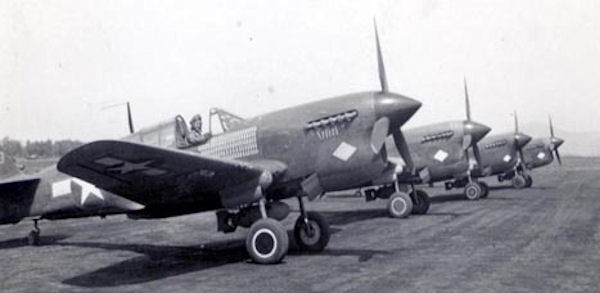
324th Fighter Group P-40 Warhawks

The 315th Fighter Squadron was constituted in 1942 and activated on 6 July at Mitchel Field, New York as one of the three original squadrons of the 324th Fighter Group. The squadron moved immediately to Philadelphia Municipal Airport, where it trained with Curtiss P-40 Warhawk fighters until October.

The squadron moved to Grenier Field when its parent group moved to the Middle East between October and December 1942 for operations with Ninth Air Force, the 315th joined the group in Egypt January 1943. The unit trained for several weeks with P-40 aircraft. While group headquarters remained in Egypt, the squadron began operating with other organizations against the enemy in Tunisia. Reunited in June 1943, the squadron and group engaged primarily in escort and patrol missions between Tunisia and Sicily until July 1943. It received a Distinguished Unit Citation (DUC) for action against the enemy from March 1943 to the Allied invasion of Sicily.

The unit trained from July to October 1943 for operations with the Twelfth Air Force. It resumed combat on 30 October 1943 and directed most of its attacks against roads, bridges, motor transport, supply areas, rolling stock, gun positions, troop concentrations, and rail facilities in Italy until August 1944. During the assault on Anzio in January 1944, it patrolled the beaches and protected convoys. It aided the Allied offensive in Italy during May 1944, receiving another DUC during the Battle of Monte Cassino for action from 12 to 14 May when the group bombed an enemy position on Monastery Hill, attacked troops massing on the hill for counterattack, and hit a nearby stronghold to force the surrender of an enemy garrison.

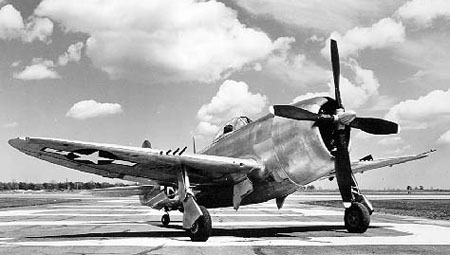
Republic P-47 Thunderbolt as flown by the unit

The 315th continued to give close support to ground forces until the fall of Rome in June 1944. The group converted to Republic P-47 Thunderbolts in July and supported the assault on southern France in August by dive-bombing gun positions, bridges, and radar facilities, and by patrolling the combat zone. The unit attacked such targets as motor transport, rolling stock, rail lines, troops, bridges, gun emplacements, and supply depots after the invasion, giving tactical support to Allied forces advancing through France. The unit aided the reduction of the Colmar Pocket in January and February 1945, and supported Seventh Army's drive through the Siegfried defenses in March. It received the French Croix de Guerre with Palm for supporting French forces during the campaigns for Italy and France in 1944 and 1945.

The 315th Fighter Squadron returned to the United States between October and November 1945 and was inactivated 7 November 1945 with its parent group at Camp Shanks, New York.

=== Active associate unit ===
In July 2005, the Air Force established a small group of regular maintenance personnel with the Vermont Air National Guard at Burlington International Airport under a program originally known as the Community Basing initiative. These personnel were assigned to Detachment 134 of the 495th Fighter Group at Shaw Air Force Base. In January 2016 the detachment was expanded into the reactivated 315th Squadron. Although assigned to the 495th Group, the squadron is an active associate of the 158th Fighter Wing of the Vermont Air National Guard, operating and maintaining the same aircraft.

== Lineage ==
- Constituted as the 315th Fighter Squadron on 24 June 1942

Activated on 6 July 1942
Inactivated on 7 November 1945
Activated on 9 January 2016

=== Assignments ===
- 324th Fighter Group, 6 July 1942 – 7 November 1945
- 495th Fighter Group, 9 January 2016 – present

=== Stations ===
- Mitchel Field, New York 6 July 1942
- Philadelphia Municipal Airport, MD 6 July 1942
- Grenier Field, New Hampshire, 23 October 1942 – 31 January 1943
- RAF Kabrit, Egypt 29 March 1943
- Tunisia,
- Kairouan Airfield, Tunisia 2 June 1943
- El Haouaria Airfield, Tunisia c. 18 June 1943
- Menzel Heurr Airfield, Tunisia 3 October 1943
- Cercola Airfield, Italy 27 October 1943
- Pignataro Maggiore Airfield, Italy, 10 May 1944
- Le Banca Airfield, Italy 7 June 1944
- Montalto Di Castro Airfield, Italy 15 June 1944
- Ghisonaccia Airfield, Corsica, 19 July 1944
- Le Luc Airfield, France 22 August 1944
- Istres Airfield (Y-17), France c. 1 September 1944
- Amberieu Airfield (Y-5), France 6 September 1944
- Dôle-Tavaux Airfield (Y-7), France 17 September 1944
- Luneville Airfield (Y-2), France 2 January 1945
- AAF Station Stuttgart/Echterdingen (R-50), Germany 3 May 1945 – 20 October 1945
- Camp Shanks, New York 6 November 1945 – 7 November 1945
- Burlington International Airport, Vermont 9 January 2016 – present

=== Aircraft ===
- Curtiss P-40 Warhawk, 1942–1944
- Republic P-47 Thunderbolt, 1944–1945
- General Dynamics F-16 Fighting Falcon, 2016–2019
- Lockheed Martin F-35 Lightning II, 2019–present

=== Awards and campaigns ===
Award streamer	Award	Dates	Notes
	Distinguished Unit Citation	May 1943 – Jul 1943	North Africa and Sicily
	Distinguished Unit Citation	12 May 1944-14 May 1944	Monte Cassino, Italy
	French Croix de Guerre with Palm	1944–1945	

Campaign streamer	Campaign	Dates	Notes
	Tunisia	29 Mar 1943 – 13 May 1943	
	Sicily	14 May 1943 – 17 August 1943	
	Naples-Foggia	18 August 1943 – 21 January 1944	
	Anzio	22 January 1944 – 24 May 1944	
	Rome-Arno	22 January 1944 – 9 September 1944	
	Northern France	25 July 1944 – 14 September 1944	
	Southern France	15 August 1944 – 14 September 1944	
	Rhineland	15 September 1944 – 21 March 1945	
	Ardennes-Alsace	16 December 1944 – 25 January 1945	
	Central Europe	22 March 1944 – 21 May 1945	
	Air Combat, EAME Theater	29 March 1943 – 11 May 1945	

== See also ==
- General Dynamics F-16 Fighting Falcon operators
- List of United States Air Force fighter squadrons
