= 99th Flying Training Squadron =

US military unit

99th Flying Training Squadron

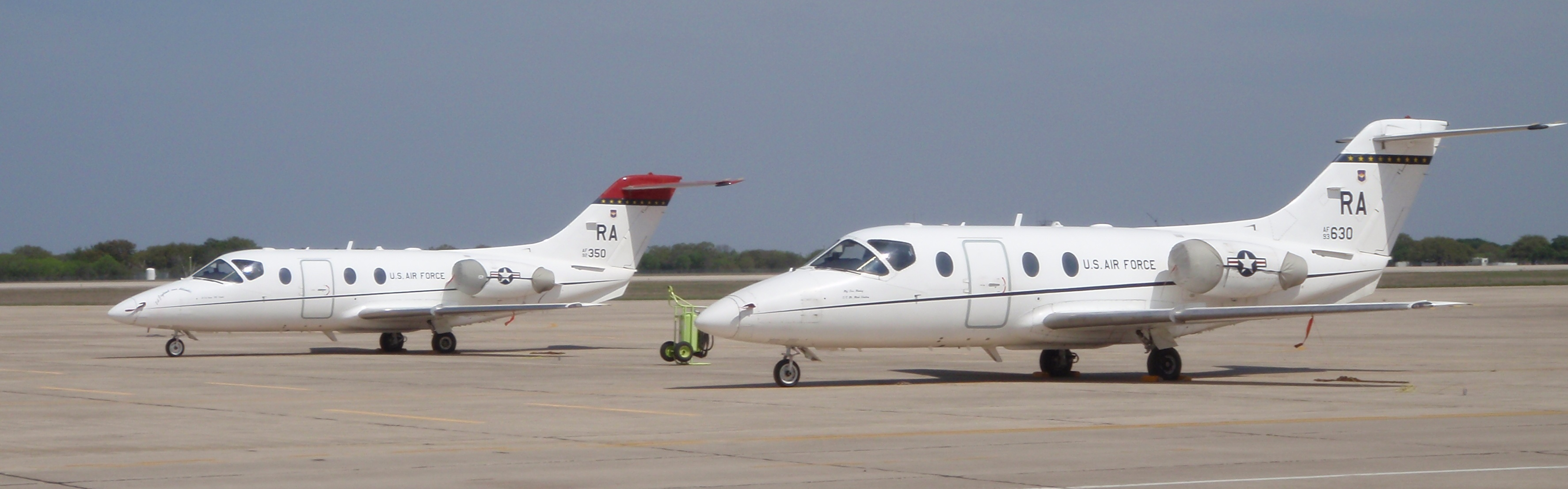
- Squadron T-1A Jayhawk
- Active: 1941–1949; 1988–1993; 1993–present
- Country: United States
- Branch: United States Air Force
- Role: Pilot Training
- Part of: Air Education and Training Command
- Garrison/HQ: Randolph Air Force Base
- Engagements: North African Campaign; Operation Husky; Operation Avalanche; Italian Campaign
- Decorations: Distinguished Unit Citation; Air Force Outstanding Unit Award

Commanders
- Notable commanders: Benjamin O. Davis, Jr.

Insignia
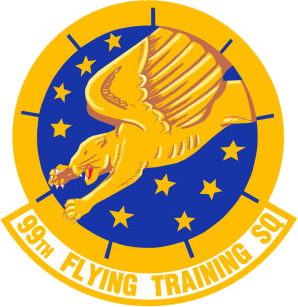
- 99th Flying Training Squadron emblem (approved 24 June 1944)

The 99th Flying Training Squadron (99 FTS) is a training squadron of the United States Air Force, part of the 12th Flying Training Wing (12 FTW) based at Randolph Air Force Base, Texas.

Operating Raytheon T-1A Jayhawks, the squadron prepares prospective flight instructors to teach undergraduate pilots and combat systems officers at various bases in the Air Education and Training Command (AETC).

The squadron was formed during World War II as the first flying unit for African Americans. Known as the Tuskegee Airmen, the unit served with distinction in the European Theater of Operations. After the war it served as a flight training unit until its inactivation in 1949.

It was re-activated in 1988 as a training squadron. Its planes' tails are painted red to honor the Tuskegee Airmen.

== History ==
=== World War II ===
The 99th was originally formed as the U.S. Army Air Forces' first African American fighter squadron, then known the 99th Pursuit Squadron. The personnel received their initial flight training at Tuskegee, Alabama, earning them the nickname Tuskegee Airmen. The squadron was originally scheduled to fly air defense over Liberia but was diverted to the Mediterranean Theater of Operations.

Considered ready for combat duty, the 99th was transported to Casablanca, Morocco, on the USS Mariposa and participated in the North African campaign. From Morocco, they traveled by train to Oujda then to Tunis, the location from which they operated against the Luftwaffe. Flyers and ground crew alike were isolated in their initial command, the 33d Fighter Group, by the racial segregation practices of the Army and group commander Colonel William Momyer. The flight crews were given little guidance from battle-experienced pilots except for a week spent with Colonel Philip Cochran. The 99th's first combat mission was to attack the small, but strategic, volcanic island of Pantelleria in the Mediterranean Sea, in preparation for the Allied invasion of Sicily in July 1943. On Friday, 2 July 1943, Lieutenant Charles B. Hall of Brazil, Indiana, shot down the first enemy plane for the group. "It is probably the first time in history that a Negro in a pursuit plane has shot down an enemy in aerial combat." (Note: Eugene Bullard was credited with one or two victories while flying with the Lafayette Flying Corps, but these were not verified. Bailey & Cony) The 99th moved to Sicily, where they would receive a Distinguished Unit Citation for their performance in combat.

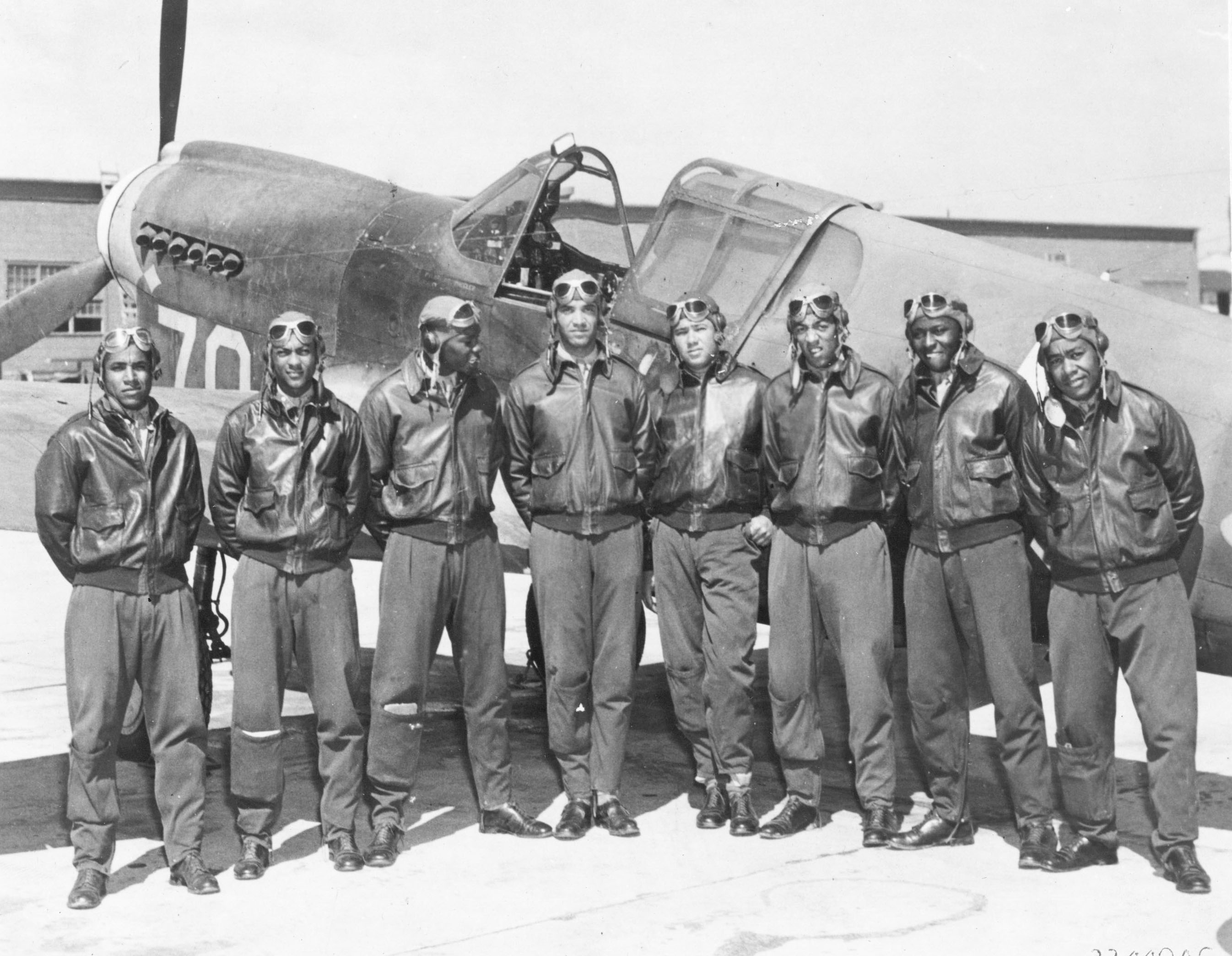
Eight Tuskegee Airmen in front of a P-40 fighter aircraft

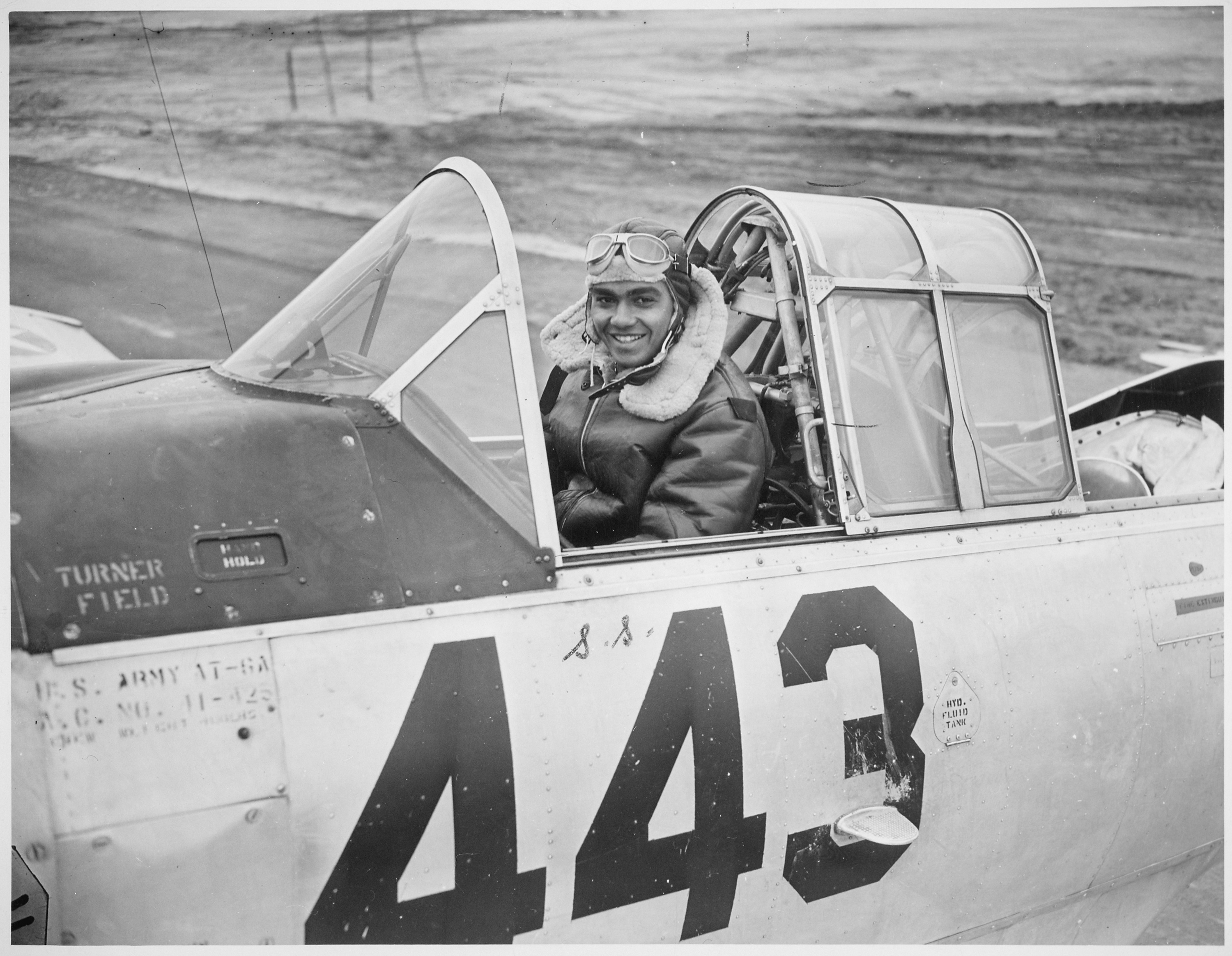
1st Lt. Lee Rayford when he returned to the United States from Italy, where he served with the 99th Fighter Squadron. ca. 1941–1945

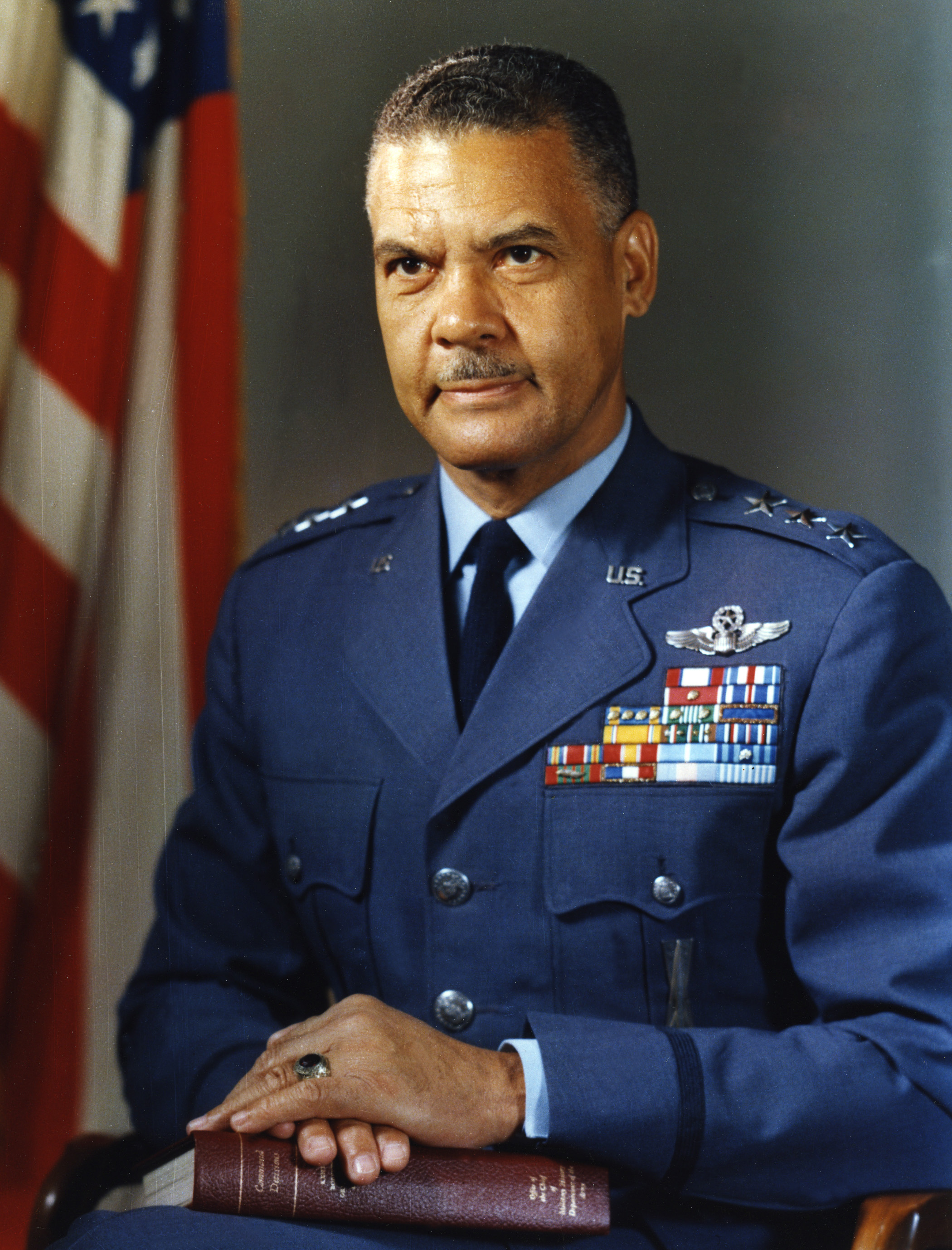
Gen. Benjamin O. Davis Jr.

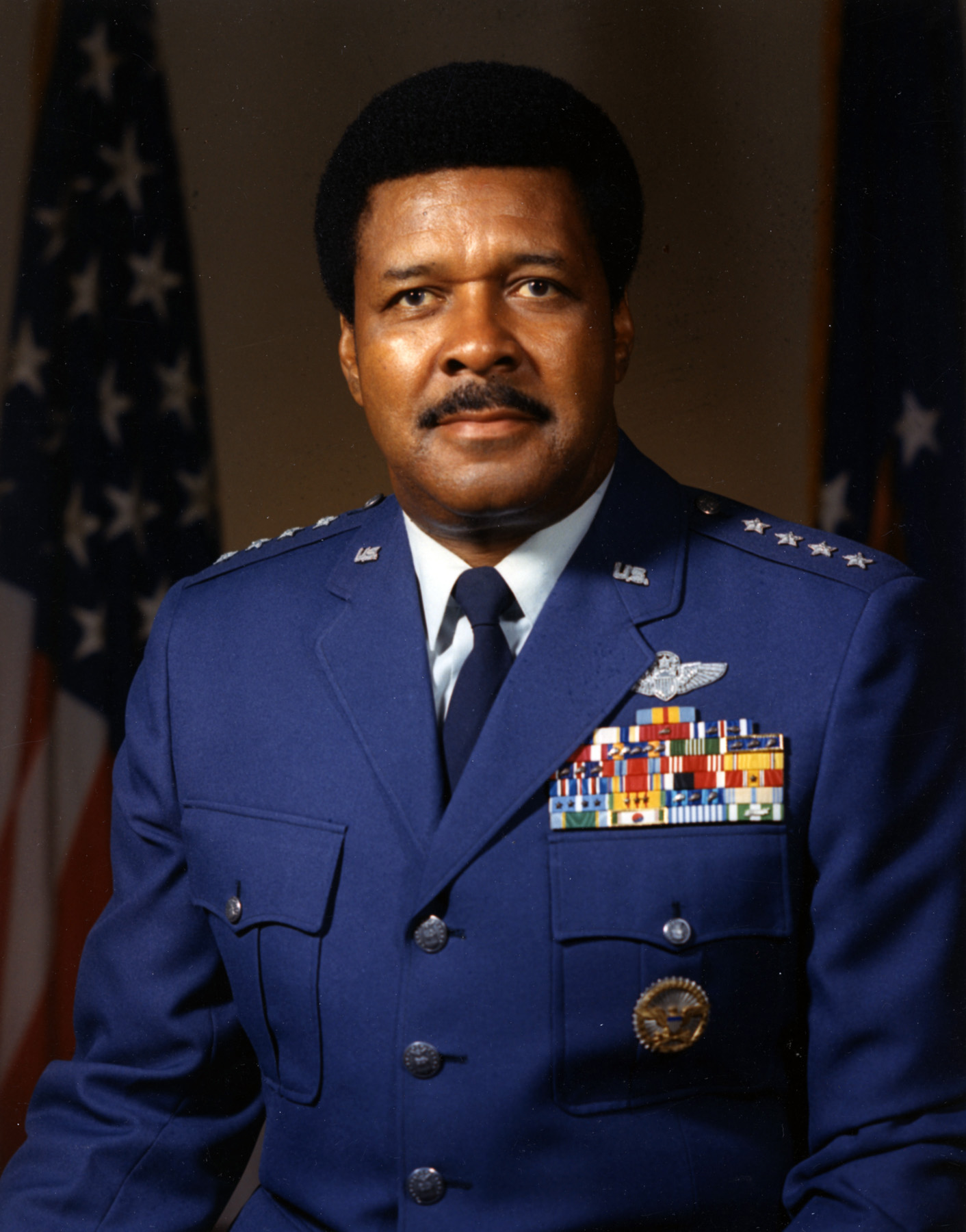
Gen. Daniel "Chappie" James, who was an instructor of the 99th Squadron

But Colonel Momyer reported to NAAF Deputy Commander Major General John K. Cannon that the 99th was ineffective in combat and its pilots cowardly, incompetent, or worse, resulting in a critical article in Time magazine. In response, the House Armed Services Committee convened a hearing to determine whether the Tuskegee Airmen experiment should be allowed to continue. Momyer characterized the 99th pilots as incompetent because they had seen little air-to-air combat. To bolster the recommendation to scrap the project, a member of the committee commissioned and then submitted into evidence, a report by the University of Texas that purported to prove that African Americans were of low intelligence and incapable of handling complex situations (such as air combat).

The 99th's commander, Colonel Benjamin O. Davis Jr., forcefully denied the claims, but only the intervention of Colonel Emmett O'Donnell Jr. prevented a recommendation for disbandment of the squadron from being sent to President Franklin D. Roosevelt. General Henry H. Arnold ordered an evaluation of all Mediterranean Theater of Operations units flying the P-40 Warhawk to determine the true merits of the 99th; the results showed the 99th Fighter Squadron to be at least equal to other units operating the fighter.

While operating from North Africa, the unit helped degrade enemy fortifications on Pantelleria and Tunisia.

The 99th supported Allied invasions of Sicily and Italy. It provided close air support to the U.S. 5th Army during its assaults on Foggia and Anzio, and to French and Polish armies in their attack on Monastery Hill near Monte Cassino. On 27 and 28 January 1944, Luftwaffe Fw 190 fighter-bombers raided Anzio, where the Allies had conducted amphibious landings on 22 January. Attached to the 79th Fighter Group, eleven of the 99th Fighter Squadron's pilots shot down enemy fighters, including Captain Charles B. Hall, who claimed two shot down, bringing his aerial victory total to three. The eight fighter squadrons defending Anzio claimed a total of 32 German aircraft shot down, while the 99th claimed the highest score among them with 13.

The squadron earned its second Distinguished Unit Citation on 12–14 May 1944, while attached to the 324th Fighter Group, attacking German positions on Monastery Hill, attacking infantry massing on the hill for a counterattack, and bombing a nearby strong point to force the surrender of the German garrison to Moroccan Goumiers.

In mid-1944, the squadron was assigned to conduct bomber escort missions. The unit supported bomber missions over Romania, France, Austria, Czechoslovakia, Poland, Yugoslavia and Greece.

During the war, the squadron was awarded three Distinguished Unit Citations.

=== Flight training ===
After the war, the squadron returned to the United States, where it flew training missions under the command of Marion Rodgers until its inactivation in 1949. It was reactivated in 1988 as a flying training unit. With the closure of Williams Air Force Base, Arizona, the squadron moved to Randolph Air Force Base, Texas. Today it operates Raytheon T-1 Jayhawk aircraft preparing instructor pilots and instructor combat systems officers to conduct undergraduate flight training in the T-1A.

=== Operations ===
Operations: World War II

== Lineage ==
- Constituted as the 99th Pursuit Squadron on 19 March 1941

Activated on 22 March 1941
Redesignated 99 Fighter Squadron on 15 May 1942
Redesignated 99th Fighter Squadron, Single Engine on 28 February 1944
Inactivated on 1 July 1949

- Redesignated 99th Flying Training Squadron on 29 April 1988

Activated on 1 July 1988
Inactivated on 1 April 1993

- Activated on 14 May 1993

=== Assignments ===
- United States Army Air Corps, 22 Mar 1941
- Air Corps Technical Training Command, 26 March 1941
- Southeast Air Corps Training Center (later Southeast Army Air Forces Training Center), 5 November 1941 (attached to III Fighter Command, 19 August–c. 2 April 1943)
- Twelfth Air Force, 24 April 1943
- XII Air Support Command (later XII Tactical Air Command), 28 May 1943 (attached to 33d Fighter Group, 29 May 1943; 324th Fighter Group, c. 29 June 1943; 33d Fighter Group, 19 July 1943; 79th Fighter Group, 16 October 1943; 324th Fighter Group, 1 April–6 June 1944)
- 332d Fighter Group, 1 May 1944 (attached to 86th Fighter Group, 11–30 June 1944)
- 477th Composite Group, 22 June 1945
- 332d Fighter Group, 1 July 1947 – 1 July 1949
- 82d Flying Training Wing, 1 June 1988
- 82d Operations Group, 15 December 1991 – 1 April 1993
- 12th Operations Group, 14 May 1993 – present

=== Stations ===
- Chanute Field, Illinois, 22 March 1941
- Maxwell Field, Alabama, 5 Nov 1941
- Tuskegee Army Air Field, Alabama, 10 November 1941 – 2 April 1943
- Casablanca Airfield, French Morocco, 24 April 1943
- Qued N'ja Airfield, French Morocco, 29 April 1943
- Fardjouna Airfield, Tunisia, 7 Jun 1943
- Licata Airfield, Sicily, Italy, 28 July 1943
- Termini Imerese, Sicily, Italy, 4 September 1943
- Barcellona Pozzo di Gotto, Sicily, Italy, 17 September 1943
- Foggia Airfield, Italy, 17 October 1943
- Madna Airfield, Italy, 22 November 1943
- Capodichino Airport, Italy, 16 January 1944
- Cercola Airfield, Italy, 2 April 1944
- Pignataro Maggiore Airfield, Italy, 10 May 1944
- Ciampino Airfield, Italy, 11 June 1944
- Orbetello, Italy, 17 June 1944
- Ramitelli Airfield, Italy, 6 July 1944
- Cattolica Airfield, Italy, c. 5 May–June 1945
- Godman Field, Kentucky, 22 June 1945
- Blythe Army Air Base, California (October–November 1946)
- Lockbourne Army Air Base (later Lockbourne Air Force Base), Ohio, 13 March 1946 – 1 July 1949
- Williams Air Force Base, Arizona, 1 June 1988 – 1 April 1993
- Randolph Air Force Base, Texas, (14 May 1993 – present)

=== Aircraft ===
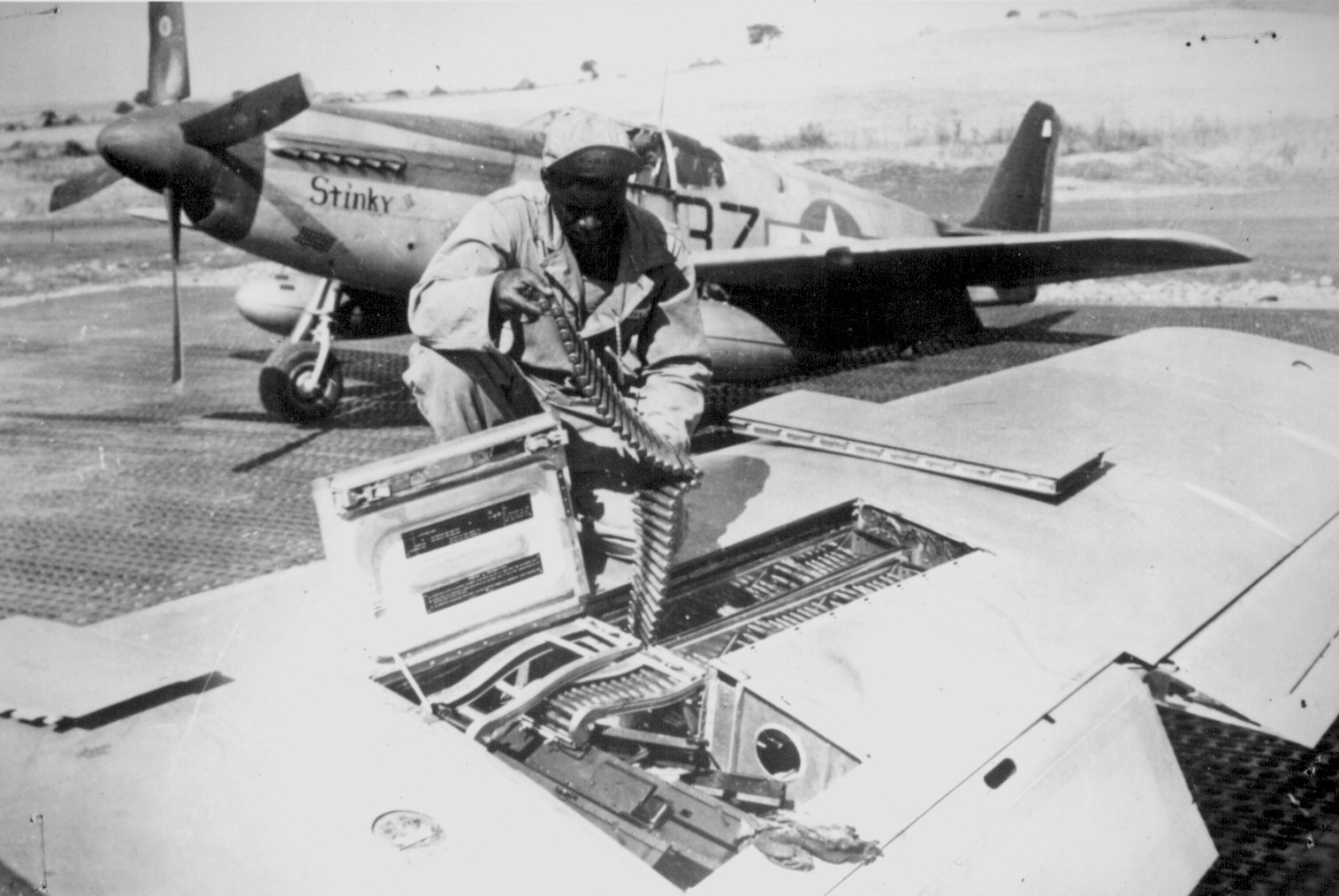
99th Fighter Squadron mechanic reloading a P-51 Mustang, during World War II.

- Curtiss P-40 Warhawk (1943–1944)
- Bell P-39 Airacobra (1944)
- North American P-51 Mustang (1944–1945)
- Republic P-47 Thunderbolt (1944, 1945–1949)
- Northrop T-38 Talon (1988–1993)
- Raytheon T-1A Jayhawk (1993–2024)
- Boeing-Saab T-7 Red Hawk (2025-present)
