= El Haouaria Airfield =

Tunisian abandoned military airfield

El Haouaria Airfield
- Part of Ninth Air Force

Site information
- Type: Military airfield
- Controlled by: United States Army Air Forces

Location
- Coordinates: 37°02′21.93″N 011°00′31.86″E

Site history
- Built: 1943
- In use: 1943

Location of El Haouaria Airfield, Tunisia

El Haouaria Airfield is an abandoned military airfield in Tunisia, located approximately 44 km northeast of Tāklisah; about 40 km east of Tunis. It was a temporary airfield constructed by the United States Army Corps of Engineers in 1943 during the Tunisian Campaign in the Second World War.

El Haouaria was used primarily by the United States Army Air Force Ninth Air Force 324th Fighter Group during June through early October 1943, flying P-40 Warhawks. After the 324th left for Menzel Heurr Airfield, the airfield was dismantled and abandoned. Today, only remains of the runway are visible in aerial photography.
