= Tāklisah =

Nabeul Governorate in Tunisia

Takelsa (Arabic: تاكلسة) is a Tunisian municipality and town located at 36°47′N 10°38′E on Cape Bon.

It is part of the governorate of Nabeul.

Takelsa is located on the Gulf of Tunis. The local economy is based on viticulture (wine and table grapes). The Mosquée Sidi Issa - Takilsa is a large white hall with a square minaret.
