= 103rd Airlift Wing =

103rd Airlift Wing

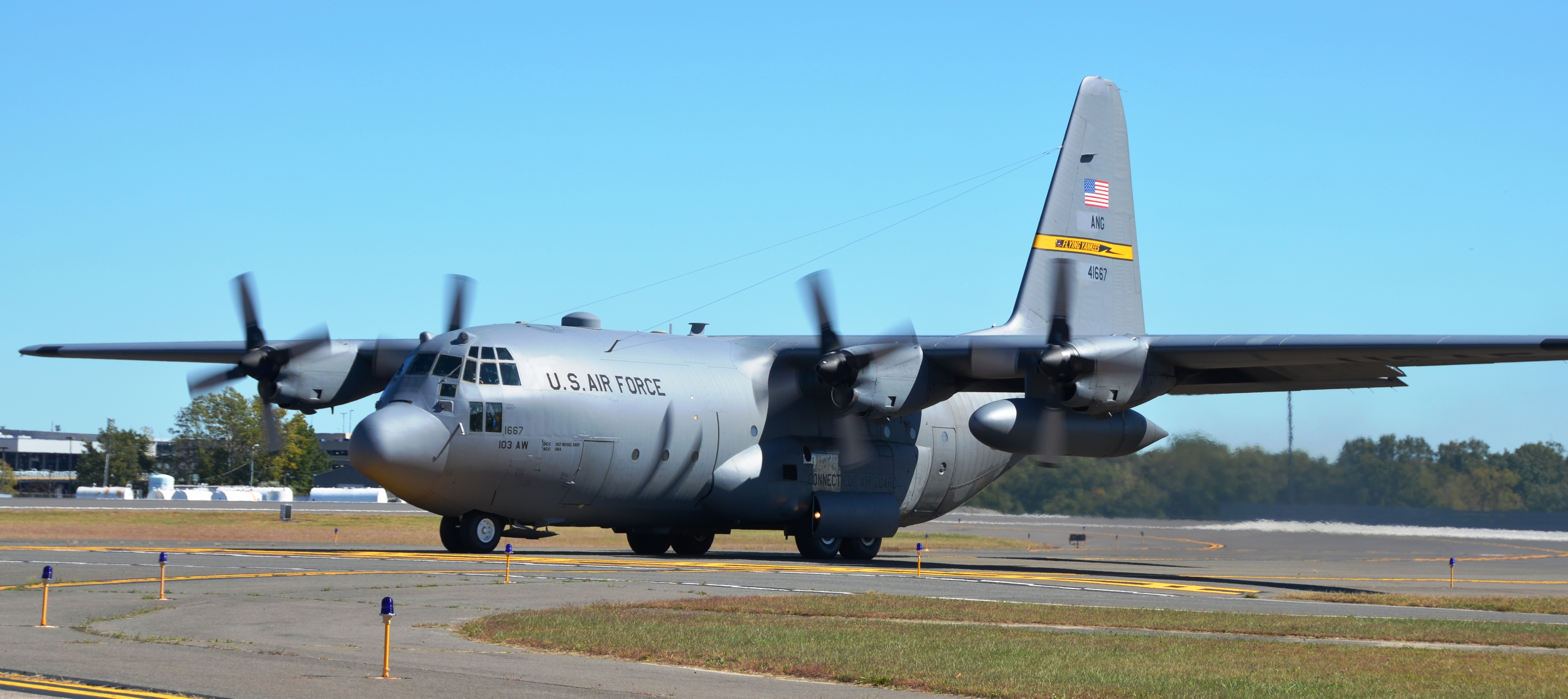
- 118th Airlift Squadron C-130 Hercules
- Active: 1942–1945; 1946–1952; 1952–present
- Country: United States
- Allegiance: Connecticut
- Branch: Air National Guard
- Type: Wing
- Role: Airlift
- Part of: Connecticut Air National Guard
- Garrison/HQ: Bradley Air National Guard Base, Windsor Locks, Connecticut
- Nickname: Flying Yankees
- Motto: Audeo (Latin for 'I Dare') (1942-1945)
- Engagements: Mediterranean Theater of Operations
- Decorations: Presidential Unit Citation Air Force Outstanding Unit Award French Croix de Guerre with Palm

Insignia
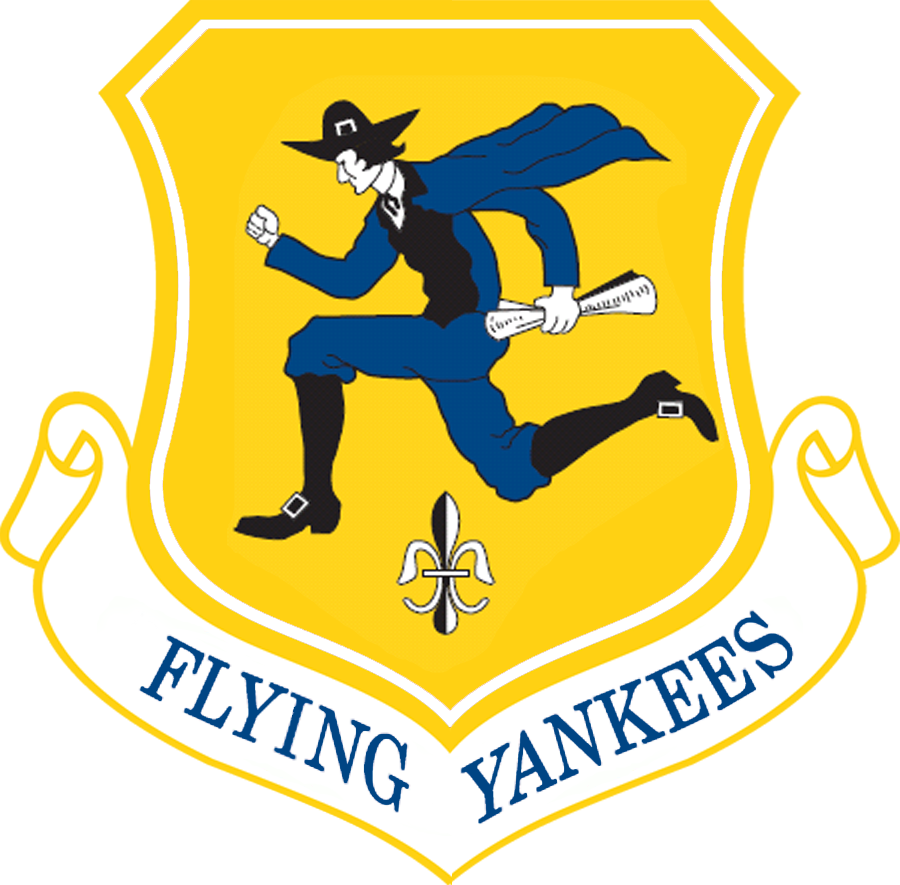
- 103rd Airlift Wing emblem (Note: Approved 1 May 1953.)

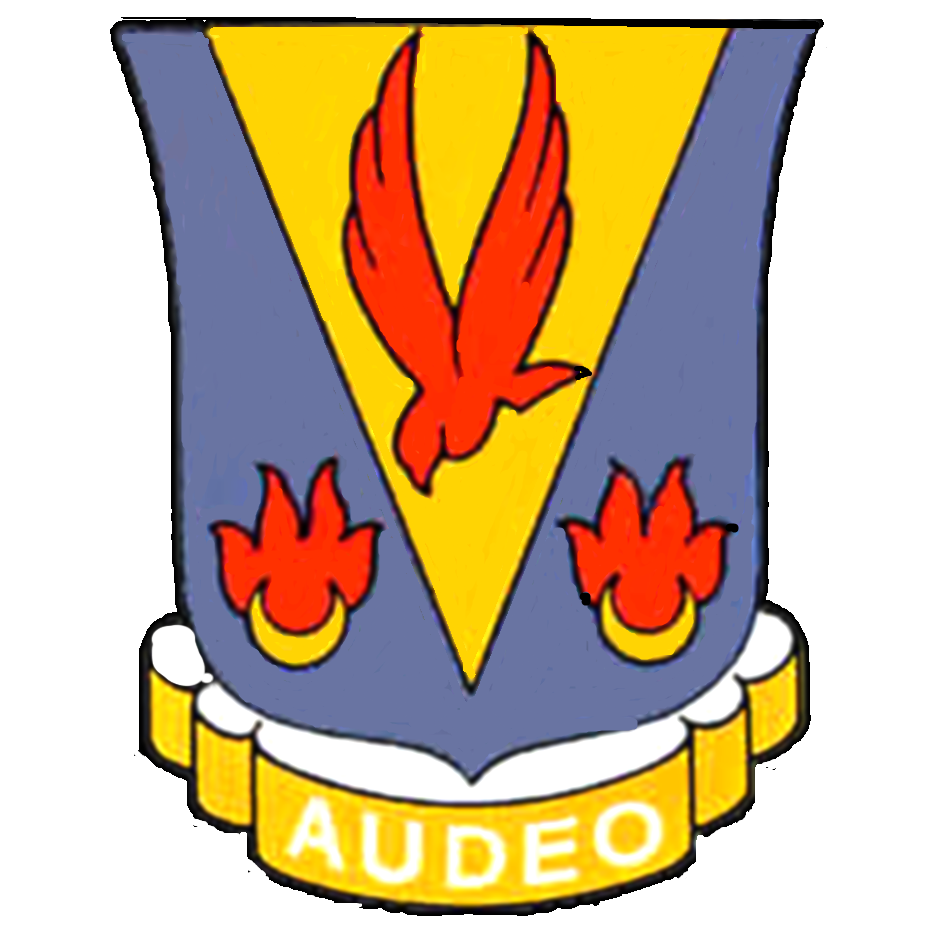
- 324th Fighter Group emblem
- Tail code: CT

Aircraft flown
- Attack: A-10 Thunderbolt II (1979-2008)
- Fighter: P-47 Thunderbolt (1944-1952)
- Transport: C-130 Hercules

The 103rd Airlift Wing is a unit of the Connecticut Air National Guard, stationed at Bradley Air National Guard Base at Bradley International Airport, Windsor Locks, Connecticut. If activated to federal service with the United States Air Force, the 103 AW is operationally-gained by the Air Mobility Command (AMC).

The 103 AW was first activated in 1943 as the 324th Fighter Group of the United States Army Air Forces. During World War II, the 324th served in combat with Ninth and Twelfth Air Force, primarily in the Mediterranean, African, and Middle East Theater. It received two Distinguished Unit Citations for engagements in the Mediterranean and the French Croix de Guerre with Palm for supporting French forces during the campaigns for Italy and France from 1944 to 1945.

In 1946 the 324th Fighter Group was redesignated as the 103rd Fighter Group and allotted to the National Guard.

The 118th Airlift Squadron, assigned to the wing's 103rd Operations Group, was first established during World War I as the 118th Aero Squadron on 31 August 1917. It was reformed on 1 November 1923, as the 118th Observation Squadron, and is one of the 29 original National Guard Observation Squadrons of the United States Army National Guard formed before World War II.

== Overview ==
The "Flying Yankees" of the 103rd Airlift Wing are the eleventh oldest Air National Guard unit in the United States, including a squadron that has served over 90 years in military aviation. They currently fly the C-130H Hercules, a four-engine turboprop military transport aircraft designed and built originally by Lockheed Aircraft, now Lockheed Martin. Capable of using unprepared runways for takeoffs and landings, the C-130 was originally designed as a troop, medical evacuation, and cargo transport aircraft. Its mission is providing theater cargo and passenger airlift.

== Units ==
The 103rd Airlift Wing consists of the following major units:

- 103rd Operations Group

118th Airlift Squadron

- 103rd Maintenance Group
- 103rd Mission Support Group
- 103rd Medical Group
- 103rd Air Operations Group

== History ==
=== World War II ===
The wing was constituted as the 324th Fighter Group in 1942 and activated on 6 July at Mitchel Field, New York. Its original squadrons were the 314th, 315th, and 316th Fighter Squadrons. The group moved immediately to Baltimore Municipal Airport, where it trained with Curtiss P-40 Warhawk fighters until October, while its squadrons trained at Baltimore and bases in Pennsylvania and Virginia.

The group moved to the Middle East between October and December 1942 for operations with Ninth Air Force along with its 314th and 316th squadrons, while the 315th remained behind until January 1943. The group trained for several weeks with P-40 aircraft. While group headquarters remained in Egypt, the squadrons of the group began operating with other organizations against the enemy in Tunisia. Reunited in June 1943, the 324th group engaged primarily in escort and patrol missions between Tunisia and Sicily until July 1943. It received a Distinguished Unit Citation (DUC) for action against the enemy from March 1943 to the invasion of Sicily.

The unit trained from July to October 1943 for operations with the Twelfth Air Force. It resumed combat on 30 October 1943 and directed most of its attacks against roads, bridges, motor transport, supply areas, rolling stock, gun positions, troop concentrations, and rail facilities in Italy until August 1944. During the assault on Anzio in January 1944, it patrolled the beaches and protected convoys. It aided the Allied offensive in Italy during May 1944, receiving another DUC during the Battle of Monte Cassino for action from 12 to 14 May when the group bombed an enemy position on Monastery Hill, attacked troops massing on the hill for counterattack, and hit a nearby stronghold to force the surrender of an enemy garrison.

The 324th continued to give close support to ground forces until the fall of Rome in June 1944. The group converted to Republic P-47 Thunderbolts in July and supported the assault on southern France in August by dive-bombing gun positions, bridges, and radar facilities, and by patrolling the combat zone. The unit attacked such targets as motor transport, rolling stock, rail lines, troops, bridges, gun emplacements, and supply depots after the invasion, giving tactical support to Allied forces advancing through France. The unit aided the reduction of the Colmar bridgehead in January and February 1945, and supported Seventh Army's drive through the Siegfried defenses in March. It received the French Croix de Guerre with Palm for supporting French forces during the campaigns for Italy and France in 1944 and 1945.

The 324th Fighter Group returned to the United States between October and November 1945 and was inactivated in November 1945.

=== Connecticut Air National Guard ===
The wartime 324th Fighter Group was redesignated as the 103rd Fighter Group, and was allotted to the National Guard, on 24 May 1946. It was organized at Bradley Field, Windsor Locks, Connecticut in July 1946 and was extended federal recognition on 7 August 1946. At the time, the group's mission was the air defense of the State of Connecticut. It was assigned the 118th Fighter Squadron and equipped with Republic P-47D (later F-47D) Thunderbolts. In September 1947, with the establishment of an independent United States Air Force, the 324th Fighter Group became part of the newly established Air National Guard.

The 103rd Fighter Wing was formed in the fall of 1950 when the Air National Guard converted to the wing base organization system. In addition to the 103rd Fighter Group, the wing included the 103rd Air Base Group, the 103rd Maintenance & Supply Group, and the 103rd Medical Group.

==== Korean War activation ====
With the surprise invasion of South Korea on 25 June 1950, and the regular military's lack of readiness, most of the Air National Guard was federalized and placed on active duty alongside the Regular Air Force. The 103rd was federalized on 2 March 1951 and the group and wing were subsequently redesignated as fighter-interceptor units.

The 103rd Fighter-Interceptor Wing (103 FIW) was assigned to the Eastern Air Defense Force of the Air Defense Command (ADC) and moved to Suffolk County Air Force Base, New York on 1 June 1951, flying air defense missions with their F-47N Thunderbolts. However, ADC was experiencing difficulty under the wing base organizational structure in deploying its fighter squadrons to best advantage. It therefore reorganized its wings on a regional basis and dispersed support units to the locations of the fighter squadrons. On 6 February 1952, the 103 FIW and its assigned groups were inactivated and most of its operational squadrons assigned to the 4709th Air Defense Wing at McGuire AFB, New Jersey. During its period of federalization, the 118th FIS transferred many of its pilots and ground support personnel to Regular Air Force units.

==== Cold War ====
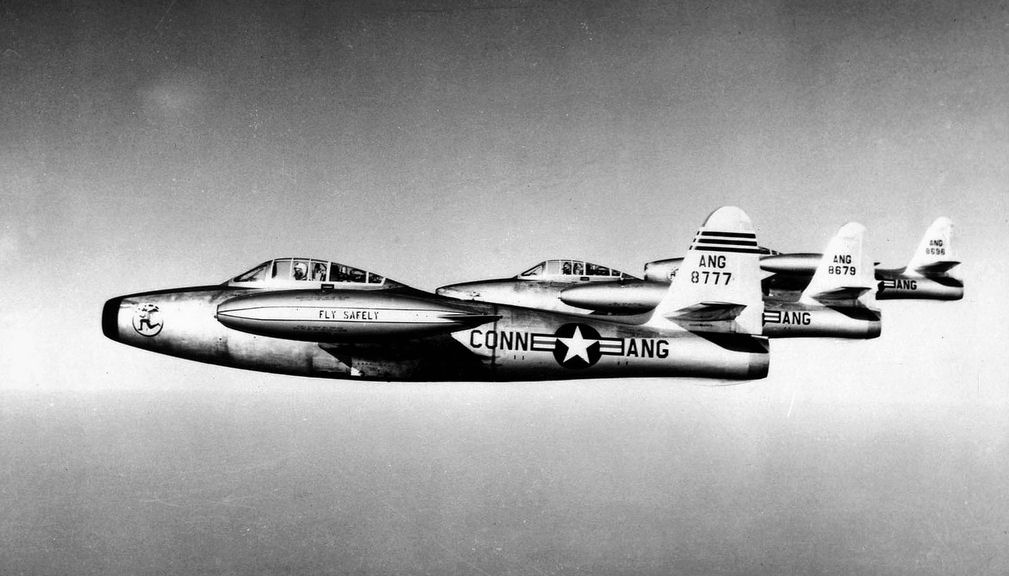
118th Fighter-Bomber Squadron – F-84D Thunderjet formation 1954

The 103rd was reactivated on 1 November 1952 with the end of the units federalization period and redesignated as the 103rd Fighter-Bomber Wing, operationally-gained by the Tactical Air Command (TAC). However, air defense remained as a secondary mission.

Upon the 118th's return, the F-47s were sent to Davis-Monthan Air Force Base for storage and the squadron was re-equipped with very long range F-51H Mustangs by TAC with an assigned mission of close air support (CAS). In January 1953, the 103rd received several F-84D Thunderjets for maintenance instruction and the squadron was fully equipped with the Thunderjet during the summer of 1953. In the spring of 1955, the F-84Gs were transferred to the Georgia Air National Guard's 128th Fighter-Interceptor Squadron and the 118th converted to the F-94B Starfire. However, the F-94Bs only remained with the 118th for about a year when they were replaced by the F-86H Sabre tactical fighter in 1957. At this time the wing, now designated the 103rd Air Defense Wing was inactivated.

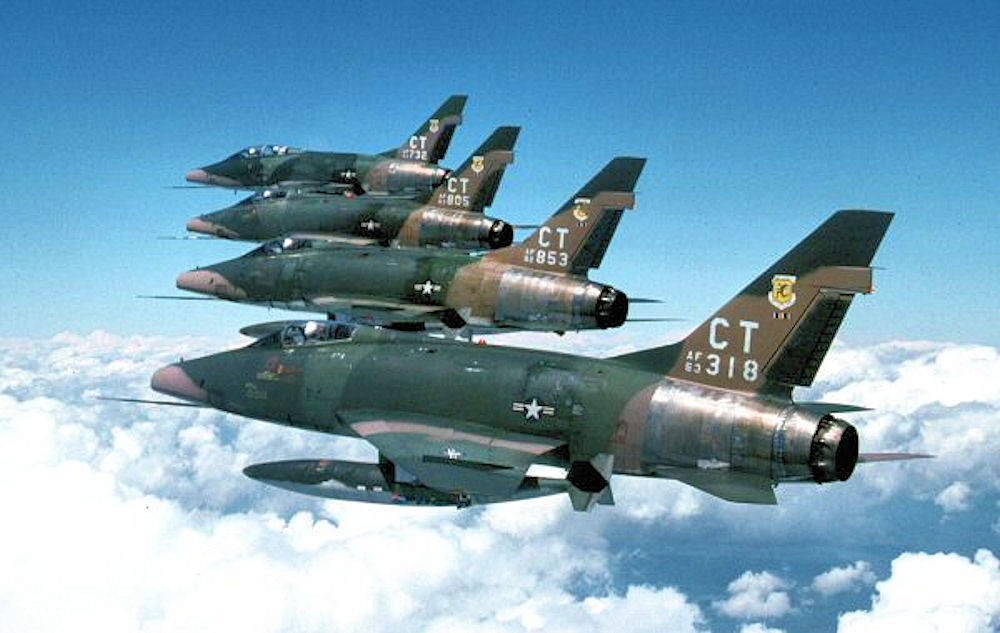
118th Tactical Fighter Squadron – F-100D Formation, 1975

The Sabres were then replaced by F-100A Super Sabres during the summer of 1960 and the Wing becoming ADC-gained. The F-100As gave way to Convair F-102 Delta Daggers in January 1966, standing a 24-hour air defense alert. then in 1971 the group transferred back to Tactical Air Command, becoming an F-100D Super Sabre Group.

From 1971 to 1979, the 103rd flew the F-100 Super Sabre and its mission was close air support and it began a NATO commitment, deploying frequently in the 1970s to bases in West Germany to reinforce United States Air Forces in Europe (USAFE). In 1979, the unit was assigned new A-10 Thunderbolt IIs as part of the "Total Force" concept which equipped Air National Guard units with front-line USAF aircraft. The USAFE commitment continued, deploying the "Warthog" to bases in West Germany and Italy.

In 1990 the 103rd was programmed to receive the specialized Block 10 F-16A/B Fighting Falcon, also referred to as the F/A-16 due to its close air support configuration. The 1990 Gulf Crisis, however, delayed this transition. During Operation Desert Storm, the F/A-16 was battle tested and it was discovered that the close air support F-16 project proved to be a failure. Subsequently, the conversion of the wing was cancelled in 1993, and the 118th squadron remained an A-10 Thunderbolt II close air support squadron.

==== Air Combat Command ====
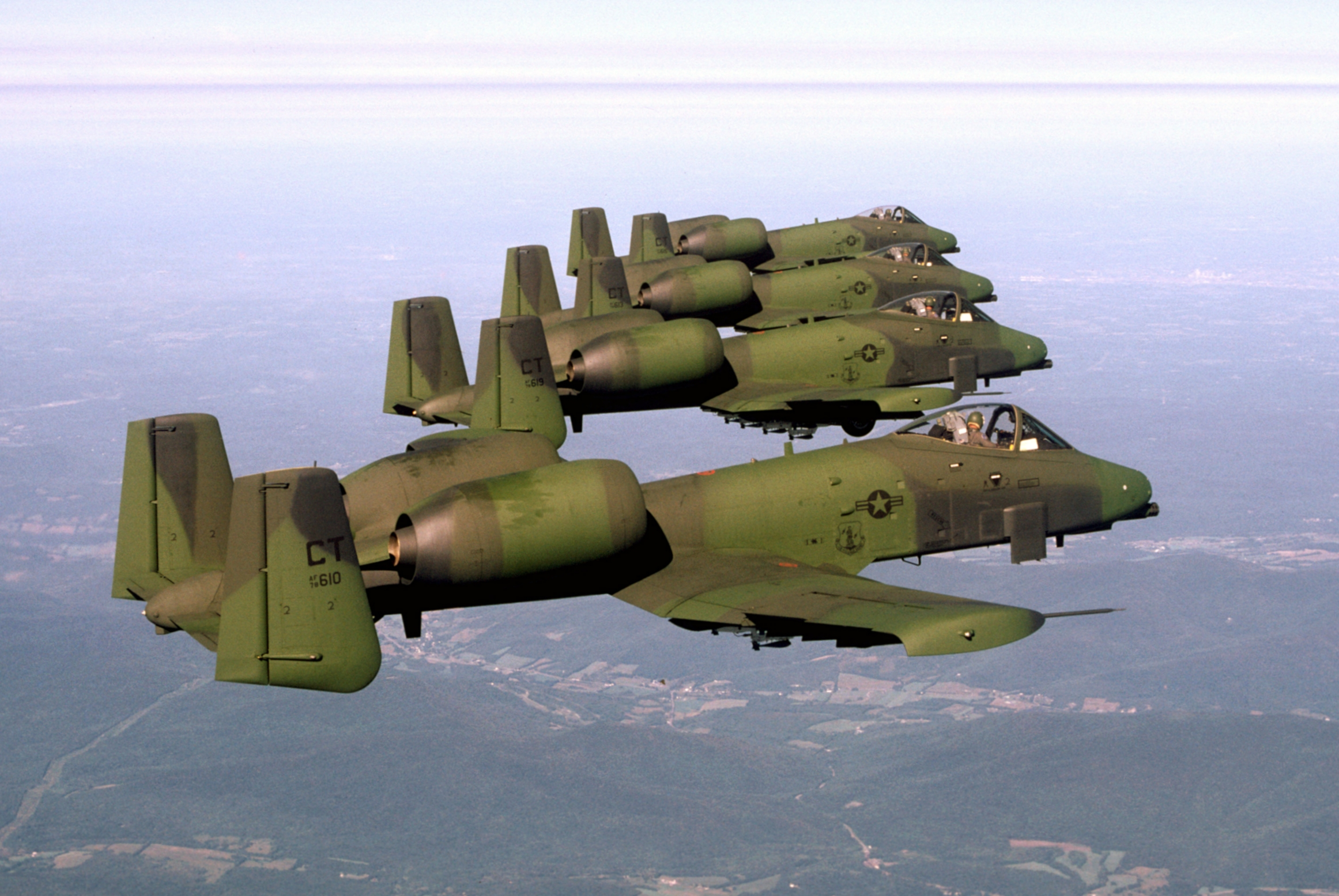
A-10As 118th FS Connecticut ANG in flight

In March 1992, with the end of the Cold War, the unit was redesignated as the 103rd Fighter Group. In June, Tactical Air Command was inactivated as part of the Air Force reorganization after the end of the Cold War. It was replaced by Air Combat Command (ACC). In 1995, in accordance with the Air Force "One Base-One Wing" directive, the 103rd adopted the Air Force Objective Organization plan and was changed in status back to a wing, with the 118th Fighter Squadron being assigned to the new 103rd Operations Group.

In what is believed to be the 103rd Fighter Wing's first "rainbow deployment" – where unit aircraft and personnel deploy and operate with aircraft and personnel from other units – members of the unit departed for Aviano Air Base Italy starting 15 November 1993 for participation in Operation DENY FLIGHT alongside A-10s and personnel from the Maryland and Michigan Air National Guard and the Air Force Reserve based at Barksdale AFB Louisiana. The 60-day deployment allowed active duty personnel supporting the operation to return to their home station during the holiday period, and marks the first time Connecticut A-10s are used in a contingency operation where they could see combat. Operation DENY FLIGHT aircraft enforced the no-fly zone over Bosnia and provided close air support to UN troops, conducting approved air strikes under a UN command arrangement. Aircraft and personnel returned from this critical mission by 15 January 1994.

In late 1995 forces associated with DENY FLIGHT were transferred to Operation DECISIVE ENDEAVOR—as part of the overall NATO operation JOINT ENDEAVOR—to provide support to NATO's Implementation Force (IFOR) and close air support for UN forces in Croatia in accordance with the Dayton Peace Accord. Connecticut Guardsmen were called to support this joint NATO and UN operation in the Balkans in late August 1996. Six aircraft and the first of what would be 350 unit personnel departed for Aviano Air Base in Italy where they would operate from 25 August through 1 November as part of Operation DECISIVE ENDEAVOR. A milestone for this deployment was the wing being the first Night Vision Imaging System capable A-10 unit to deploy to a contingency operation.

In mid-1996, the Air Force, in response to budget cuts, and changing world situations, began experimenting with Air Expeditionary organizations. The Air Expeditionary Force (AEF) concept was developed that would mix Active-Duty, Reserve and Air National Guard elements into a combined force. Instead of entire permanent units deploying as "Provisional" as in the 1991 Gulf War, Expeditionary units are composed of "aviation packages" from several wings, including active-duty Air Force, the Air Force Reserve Command and the Air National Guard, would be married together to carry out the assigned deployment rotation.

Other deployments of the 118th EFS were made to augment combat operations during Operations Deny Flight/Southern Watch to Al Jaber Air Base Kuwait in April 1999 and again in September 2001. The Connecticut Air National Guard was mobilized by Presidential Order in February 2003 along with units of the Massachusetts Air National Guard for deployment to Southwest Asia for what was to become Operation IRAQI FREEDOM. There the unit, operating as part of the 387th Air Expeditionary Group flew over 892 combat missions over western Iraq from March through April 2003.

==== Airlift mission ====
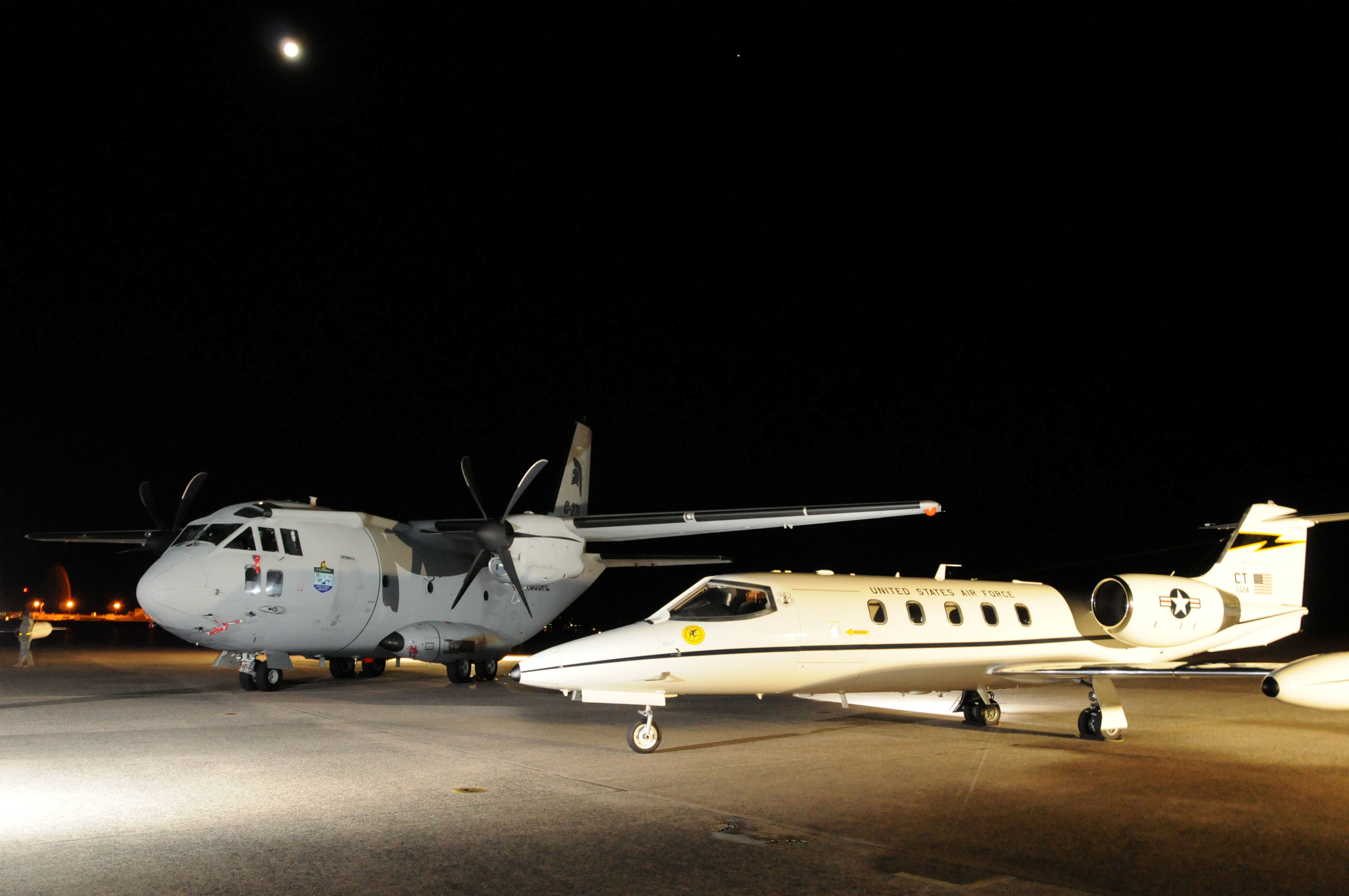
118th Airlift Squadron C-21A Learjet and a C-27 Spartan

The 2005 Base Realignment and Closure Commission recommended to the Department of Defense to realign Bradley International Airport Air Guard Station by distributing the 103rd's A-10s to the 104th Fighter Wing at Barnes Municipal Airport Air Guard Station (nine aircraft) and retirement (six aircraft). The wing's expeditionary combat support (ECS) elements would remain in place at Bradley and Bradley would retain capability to support a Homeland Defense mission. By combining the two units into one squadron the Air Force would retain the trained A-10 pilots and maintenance technicians in the area and create an optimum-sized and more effective squadron.

In April 2008, the 103rd became an Airlift Wing. Its new missions now include; a bridge mission flying C-21A Learjets supporting JOSAC VIP airlift, counter drug operations in the U.S., Central America, South America and the Caribbean, A Centralized Intermediate Repair Facility (CIRF) for TF-34 engines used on A-10 attack aircraft and an Air Operations Center (AOC) responsible for Command and Control operations during wartime.

Sometime between FY 2012 and 2014, the 103rd was programmed to receive the new Joint Cargo Aircraft, the C-27 Spartan. However, the Air Force has recently announced the end of the C-27 Spartan program, eliminating the aircraft from Air National Guards units. Instead, in September 2013 the unit received eight C-130H Hercules aircraft, the first aircraft of this type to serve the 103rd Airlift Wing.

== Lineage ==
103rd Airlift Wing

- Constituted as the 324th Fighter Group on 24 June 1942

Activated on 6 July 1942
Inactivated on 7 November 1945

- Redesignated 103rd Fighter Group and allotted to the National Guard on 24 May 1946.

Activated on 1 July 1946
Extended federal recognition on 7 August 1946
Federalized and ordered to active service on 2 March 1951
Redesignated: 103rd Fighter-Interceptor Group on 2 March 1951
Inactivated on 6 February 1952
Returned to Connecticut state control on 1 November 1952

- Activated on 1 November 1952
- Redesignated 103rd Fighter-Bomber Group 1 January 1953

Redesignated 103rd Fighter-Interceptor Group on 1 July 1955
Redesignated 103rd Fighter Group (Air Defense) on 1 July 1955
Redesignated 103rd Tactical Fighter Group on 30 November 1957
Redesignated 103rd Fighter Group (Air Defense) on 1 September 1960
Redesignated 103rd Tactical Fighter Group on 12 June 1971
Redesignated 103rd Fighter Group on 15 March 1992

- Redesignated 103rd Fighter Wing on 11 October 1995

Redesignated 103rd Airlift Wing on 1 April 2008

103rd Air Defense Wing

- Constituted as the 103rd Fighter Wing on 31 October 1950 and allotted to the Air National Guard

Activated on 1 November 1950 and extended federal recognition

- Federalized and ordered to active service on 2 March 1951
- Redesignated 103rd Fighter-Interceptor Wing on 2 March 1951

Inactivated on 6 February 1952
Returned to Connecticut state control on 1 November 1952

- Activated on 1 November 1952
- Redesignated: 103rd Fighter-Bomber Wing 1 January 1953

Redesignated: 103rd Fighter-Interceptor Wing on 1 July 1955
Redesignated: 103rd Air Defense Wing on 1 July 1955
Inactivated on 1 July 1957

=== Assignments ===
103rd Airlift Wing

- I Fighter Command: 6 July 1942 (attached to Philadelphia Fighter Wing, 6 July 1942 – 8 October 1942)
- Ninth Air Force: December 1942 (attached to Royal Air Force Middle East Command)
- 64th Fighter Wing: July 1943 (remained attached to Royal Air Force Middle East Command)
- XII Air Support Command (later XII Tactical Air Command): 25 October 1943
- Army Service Forces, New York Port of Embarkation, 20 October 1945 – 7 November 1945
- Connecticut Air National Guard: 7 August 1946

Gained by: Air Defense Command – 1 July 1948, Continental Air Command −1 December 1950, Air Defense Command

- 103rd Fighter Wing: 1 November 1950
- Air Defense Command: 2 March 1951
- 103rd Fighter-Interceptor Wing, 23 March 1951 – 6 February 1952
- 103rd Fighter-Interceptor Wing (later 103rd Fighter-Interceptor Wing, 103rd Air Defense Wing), 1 November 1952
- Connecticut Air National Guard: 1 July 1957
- 102nd Tactical Fighter Wing: 1 November 1957

Gained by: Tactical Air Command

- 101st Air Defense Wing: 1 September 1960

Gained by: Boston Air Defense Sector, Air Defense Command, 1 September 1960
Gained by: 35th Air Division, Air Defense Command, 1 April 1966
Gained by: 35th Air Division, Aerospace Defense Command, 19 January 1968
Gained by: 21st Air Division, Aerospace Defense Command, 1 January 1970

- 102nd Tactical Fighter Wing: 12 June 1971

Gained by: Tactical Air Command, 12 June 1971

- 127th Tactical Fighter Wing: c. June 1972
- 174th Tactical Fighter Wing: 1979
- 128th Fighter Wing: 15 March 1992

Gained by: Air Combat Command, 1 June 1992

- Connecticut Air National Guard: 1994

Gained by: Air Mobility Command, 1 April 2008–present

103rd Air Defense Wing

- Connecticut Air National Guard: 1 November 1950

Gained by Air Defense Command

- Eastern Air Defense Force: 2 March 1951 – 6 February 1952
- Connecticut Air National Guard: 1 November 1952 – 1 July 1957

=== Components ===
103rd Airlift Wing

- 103rd Logistics Group (later Maintenance Group): 11 October 1995 – present
- 103rd Medical Group: 11 October 1995 – present
- 103rd Operations Group: 11 October 1995 – present
- 103rd Support Group (later Mission Support Group): 11 October 1995 – present
- 118th Fighter (later Fighter-Interceptor, Fighter Bomber, Tactical Fighter, Fighter, Airlift) Squadron: 7 August 1946 – 6 February 1952; 1 November 1952 – 11 October 1995
- 152nd Fighter Squadron: 15 September 1948 – 10 February 1951: 1 March 1953 – 19 November 1955
- 314th Fighter Squadron: 6 July 1942 – 7 November 1945
- 315th Fighter Squadron: 6 July 1942 – 7 November 1945
- 316th Fighter Squadron: 6 July 1942 – 7 November 1945

103rd Air Defense Wing

- 103rd Air Base Group, 1 November 1950 – 2 March 1951; 23 March 1951 – 6 February 1952; 1 November 1952 – 15 April 1956
- 103rd Fighter Group (later Fighter-Interceptor Group, Fighter-Bomber Group, Fighter Group (Air Defense)) 1 November 1950 – 2 March 1951; 23 March 1951 – 6 February 1952; 1 November 1952 – 1 July 1957
- 103rd Medical Group, 1 November 1950 – 2 March 1951; 23 March 1951 – 6 February 1952; 1 November 1952 – 15 April 1956
- 103rd Maintenance & Supply Group, 1 November 1950 – 2 March 1951; 23 March 1951 – 6 February 1952; 1 November 1952 – 15 April 1956

=== Stations ===
103rd Airlift Wing

- Mitchel Field, New York 6 July 1942
- Baltimore Municipal Airport, MD 6 July – 8 October 1942
- RAF El Amiriya Egypt December 1942
- RAF Kabrit, Egypt 2 February 1943
- Kairouan Airfield, Tunisia 2 June 1943
- El Haouaria Airfield, Tunisia c. 18 June 1943
- Menzel Heurr Airfield, Tunisia 3 October 1943
- Cercola Airfield, Italy 25 October 1943
- Pignataro Maggiore Airfield, Italy, 6 May 1944
- Le Banca Airfield, Italy 6 June 1944
- Montalto Di Castro Airfield, Italy 14 June 1944
- Ghisonaccia Airfield, Corsica, 19 July 1944
- Le Luc Airfield, France 25 August 1944
- Istres Airfield (Y-17), France 2 September 1944
- Amberieu Airfield (Y-5), France 6 September 1944
- Dôle-Tavaux Airfield (Y-7), France 20 September 1944
- Luneville Airfield (Y-2), France 4 January 1945
- AAF Station Stuttgart/Echterdingen (R-50), Germany 8 May 1945
- Camp Shanks, New York 20 October 1945 – 7 November 1945
- Bradley Field, Windsor Locks, Connecticut, 7 August 1946
- Bradley International Airport, 1 January 1947
- Suffolk County Air Force Base, New York, 1 June 1951 – 6 February 1952
- Bradley Field (later Bradley Air National Guard Base), Windsor Locks, Connecticut, 1 November 1952 – present

103rd Air Defense Wing

- Brainard Field, Hartford, Connecticut, 1 November 1950
- Suffolk County Air Force Base, New York, 1 June 1951 – 6 February 1952
- Brainard Field, Hartford, Connecticut, 1 November 1952 – 1 July 1957

=== Aircraft ===
- P-40 Warhawk, 1942–1944
- P-47 Thunderbolt, 1944–1945
- F-47N Thunderbolt, 1946–1952
- F-51H Mustang, 1952–1953
- F-84D Thunderjet, 1953–1956
- F-94B Starfire, 1956–1957
- F-86H Sabre, 1957–1960
- F-100A Super Sabre, 1960–1966
- F/TF-102A Delta Dagger, 1966–1971
- F-100D/F Super Sabre, 1971–1979
- A-10A Thunderbolt II, 1979–2008
- C-21A Learjet, 2007–2013
- C-27J Spartan, Proposed 2012–2014 service entry before the USAF canceled the project
- C-130H Hercules, 2013–present

=== Awards and campaigns ===
Award streamer	Award	Dates	Notes
	Distinguished Unit Citation	May 1943 – Jul 1943	North Africa and Sicily 324th Fighter Group
	Distinguished Unit Citation	12 May 1944 – 14 May 1944	Monte Cassino, Italy 324th Fighter Group
	Air Force Outstanding Unit Award	1 January 1972 – 31 December 1973	103rd Tactical Fighter Group
	Air Force Outstanding Unit Award	1 January 1976 – 31 December 1977	103rd Tactical Fighter Group
	Air Force Outstanding Unit Award	19 May 1985 – 18 May 1987	103rd Tactical Fighter Group
	Air Force Outstanding Unit Award	1 July 1992 – 30 June 1994	103rd Fighter Group
	French Croix de Guerre with Palm	1944–1945	324th Fighter Group

Campaign Streamer	Campaign	Dates	Notes
	Tunisia	December 1942-13 May 1943	324th Fighter Group
	Sicily	14 May 1943 – 17 August 1943	324th Fighter Group
	Naples-Foggia	18 August 1943 – 21 January 1944	324th Fighter Group
	Anzio	22 January 1944 – 24 May 1944	324th Fighter Group
	Rome-Arno	22 January 1944 – 9 September 1944	324th Fighter Group
	Northern France	25 July 1944 – 14 September 1944	324th Fighter Group
	Southern France	15 August 1944 – 14 September 1944	324th Fighter Group
	Rhineland	15 September 1944 – 21 March 1945	324th Fighter Group
	Ardennes-Alsace	16 December 1944 – 25 January 1945	324th Fighter Group
	Central Europe	22 March 1944 – 21 May 1945	324th Fighter Group
	Air Combat, EAME Theater	29 March 1943 – 11 May 1945	324th Fighter Group
