= Ambérieu-en-Bugey Air Base =

Ambérieu-en-Bugey Air Base Détachement Air 278 Ambérieu-en-Bugey

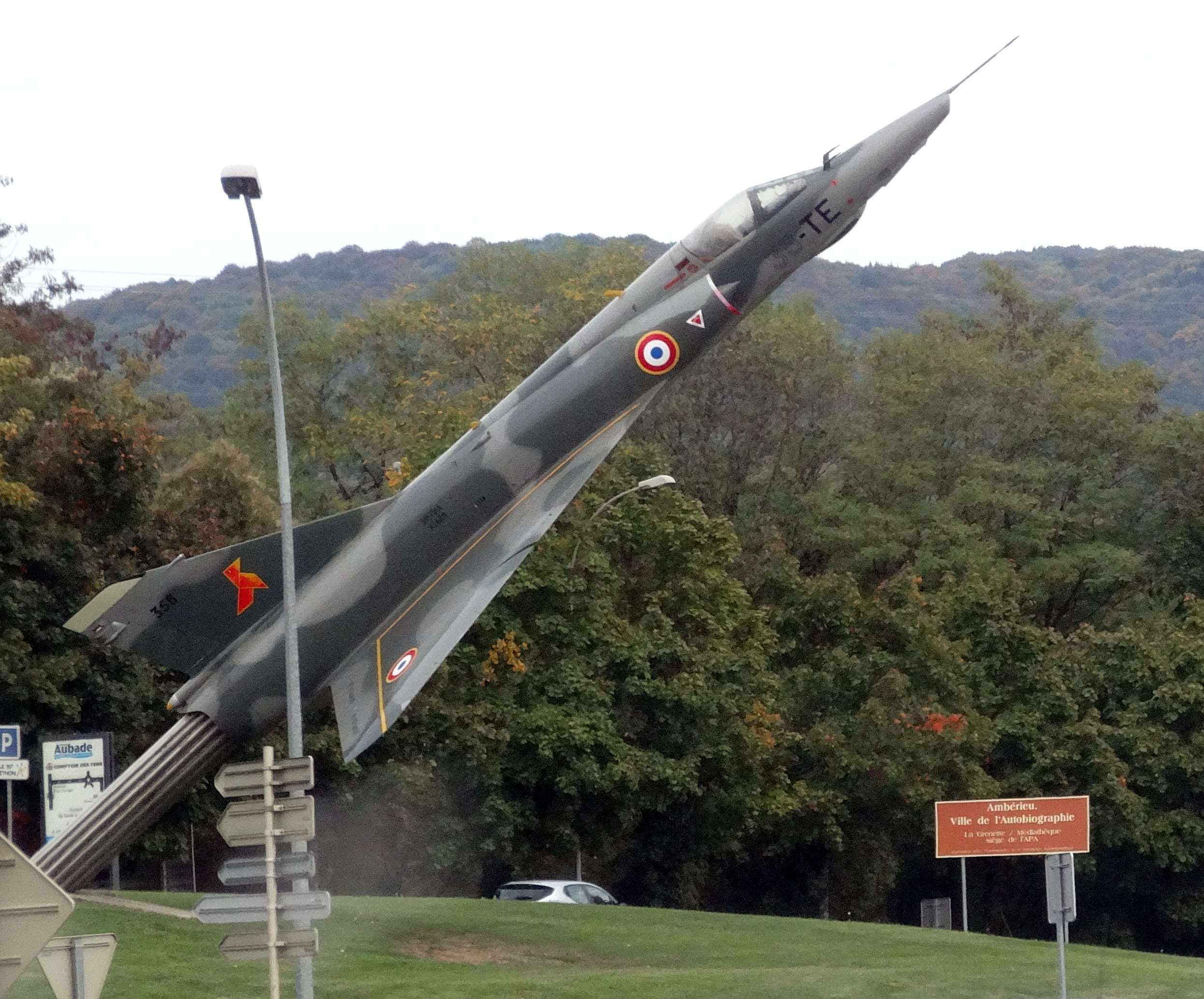
- Dassault Mirage III gate guardian near the air base entrance.
- IATA: none; ICAO: LFXA

Summary
- Airport type: Military / public use
- Owner: Government of France
- Operator: Armée de l'air et de l'espace
- Location: Ambérieu-en-Bugey, France
- Elevation AMSL: 823 ft (251 m)
- Coordinates: 45°59′14″N 005°19′42″E

Map
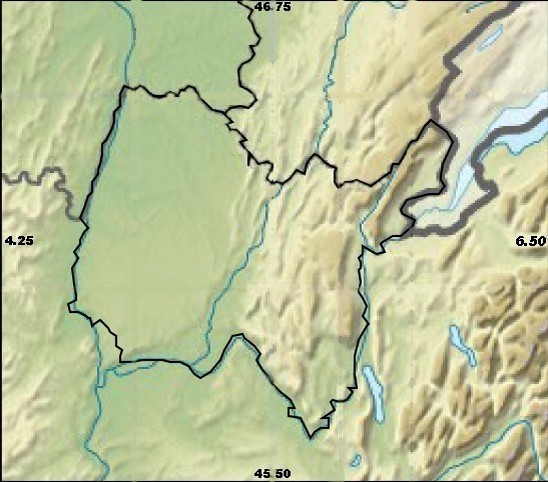
- Location of airport in Ain department Location of Ain department in France

Runways
Direction	Length		Surface
Direction	m	ft	Surface
01/19	2,000	6,562	Asphalt
02/20	800	2,625	Grass

Ambérieu-en-Bugey Air Base (French: Détachement Air 278 Ambérieu-en-Bugey) (ICAO: LFXA) is a front-line French Air and Space Force (French: Armée de l'air et de l'espace or ALA) base located approximately 5 km north-northwest of Ambérieu-en-Bugey, in the Ain department of the Rhône-Alpes region in eastern France.

== Overview ==
Ambérieu-en-Bugey Air Base is a primary repair depot and supply centre for avionics, ground telecommunication equipment, navigation aids and the manufacture of simple equipment.

It also supports calibration and repair of all Armée de l'Air precision measuring equipment and the manufacture and repair of aircrew survival equipment.

Ambérieu has two Jodel D140C Mousquetaire aircraft assigned for courier duty.

== World War II ==
Built during World War II as a temporary all-weather airfield, the facility was constructed by the United States Army Air Forces XII Engineer Command during late August 1944 after German forces were cleared from the area. It was built on a graded surface using Pierced Steel Planking for runways and parking areas, as well as for dispersal sites. In addition, tents were used for billeting and also for support facilities; an access road was built to the existing road infrastructure; a dump for supplies, ammunition, and gasoline drums, along with a drinkable water and minimal electrical grid for communications and station lighting. The airfield was known as Ambérieu Airfield or Advanced Landing Ground Y-5.

It was turned over to the Twelfth Air Force for operational use on 6 September 1944. The 324th Fighter Group flew P-40 Warhawks from the field during September, after which it moved up to Tavaux. Once the 324th moved out, Ambérieu Airfield became a rear area support base operated by the 1st Air Service Squadron for transport aircraft moving supplies and equipment to the front.

With the end of the war in Europe in May, 1945 the Americans began to withdraw their aircraft and personnel. Control of the airfield was turned over to French authorities on 29 May 1945.

== Facilities ==
The airport resides at an elevation of 823 feet (251 m) above mean sea level. It has one paved runway (01/19) with an asphalt surface measuring 2,000 by 30 metres (6,562 ft × 98 ft), and one turf landing surface (02/20) measuring 800 by 100 metres (2,625 ft × 328 ft).

== See also ==
- Advanced Landing Ground
