= RAF El Amiriya =

Royal Air Force airfield in Egypt

RAF El Amiriya
- Alexandria in Egypt

Site information
- Type: Military airfield
- Operator: Royal Air Force (RAF)
- Controlled by: RAF Middle East Command
- Condition: Abandoned

Location
- Location in Egypt
- Coordinates: 31°02′19.46″N 029°47′59.64″E

Site history
- Built: 1917
- In use: 1917 – 1946
- Fate: Abandoned after World War II
- Battles/wars: North African Campaign

Garrison information
- Occupants: 79th Fighter Group (USAAF); 324th Fighter Group (USAAF)

RAF El Amiriya is a former Royal Air Force station in Egypt, located approximately 16 km south-southwest of Alexandria; 180 km northwest of Cairo, Egypt.

El Amiriya was a pre–World War II airfield, first used in 1917. During the Second World War, the station was also referred to as Landing Grounds 85 – 99, 154 and 171–175, it was used as a military airfield by the Royal Air Force and the United States Army Air Forces during the North African campaign against Axis forces. By 1958, RAF El Amiriya and its southern airfield was evidently abandoned.

== History ==
USAAF Ninth Air Force units which used the airfield were:

- 79th Fighter Group, 19 November 1942 – 14 January 1943, Curtiss P-40 Warhawk
- 324th Fighter Group, December 1942 – 2 February 1943, P-40 Warhawk

After the war, the airfield appears to have been closed about 1946. Today, the area is abandoned with various concrete parts of the station still in evidence when viewed by aerial photography.

British Coordinates

- LG-85 30°47′0″N 29°51′5″E
- LG-99 30°48′5″N 29°54′5″E
- LG-154 30°46′5″N 29°50′5″E
- LG-171 30°56′0″N 29°31′0″E
- LG-175 30°55′0″N 29°55′0″E

== See also ==
- List of North African airfields during World War II
