= Kibrit Air Base =

Kibrit Air Base قاعدة كبريت الجوية
- IATA: none; ICAO: none

Summary
- Airport type: Military
- Operator: Egyptian Air Force
- Location: Kabrit, Egypt
- Elevation AMSL: 1,560 ft / 475 m
- Coordinates: 30°14′45″N 032°29′24″E

Map
- Location of Kibrit Air Base

Runways
Direction	Length		Surface
Direction	m	ft	Surface
14R/32L	2,684	8,805	Asphalt
14L/32R	2,684	8,805	Asphalt

Kibrit Air Base (formerly Kabrit Air Base) is an operational Egyptian Air Force (Arabic: القوات الجوية المصرية, al-Qūwāt al-Gawwīyah al-Miṣrīyah) helicopter base located in Egypt, approximately 20 miles north of Suez and 125 km east of Cairo. An SA-342 Gazelle unit is based here. The name of the station came from a nearby village, and in Egyptian means "sulphur". Kabrit now is the name of a pilot station for Suez canal navigation on the same location.

== History ==
During World War II the facility was known as Royal Air Force Station Kabrit, (Landing Ground 213) and was a major Royal Air Force facility which was used during the Western Desert campaign. In 1941, it was where the Special Air Service (SAS) was formed. Beginning in 1943, United States Army Air Forces Ninth Air Force units arrived to supplement the RAF against the Germans in the Western Desert.

Second World War

Unit	From	To	Aircraft	Notes
No. 13 Squadron RAF	19 December 1943	22 March 1944	Martin Baltimore IV & V	
No. 14 Squadron RAF Detachment	May 1942	June 1942	Bristol Blenheim IV	
No. 40 Squadron RAF	20 August 1942	8 November 1942	Vickers Wellington IC	
No. 55 Squadron RAF	4 January 1944	24 March 1944	Martin Baltimore IV & V	
No. 80 Squadron RAF	9 November 1943	20 January 1944	Supermarine Spitfire IX	
No. 104 Squadron RAF	14 January 1942 26 June 1942	13 May 1942 7 November 1942	Vickers Wellington II	
No. 108 Squadron RAF	1 August 1941	12 September 1941	Vickers Wellington IC	Reformed here
	26 June 1942	19 August 1942	Consolidated Liberator II	
No. 113 Squadron RAF	22 February 1941	14 March 1941	Bristol Blenheim IV	
No. 148 Squadron RAF	26 March 1941 26 June 1942	15 May 1942 19 August 1942	Vickers Wellington IC & II	
No. 162 Squadron RAF	4 January 1942	6 January 1942	Vickers Wellington IC & II	Formed here
No. 203 Squadron RAF	16 April 1941 30 April 1941	24 April 1941 20 June 1941	Bristol Blenheim IV	
324th Fighter Group, 315th Squadron	July 1943		Curtiss P-40F or K Warhawk	
57th Bombardment Wing HQs	July 1943		North American B-25C or D Mitchell; Douglas A-20 Havoc	

Post war

Unit	From	To	Next base	Aircraft	Notes
No. 13 Squadron RAF	14 December 1946	5 February 1947	RAF Fayid	de Havilland Mosquito PR.34	
	28 February 1951	1 January 1955	RAF Abu Sueir	Supermarine Spitfire PR.11 then Gloster Meteor PR.10	
No. 32 Squadron RAF	15 September 1954	14 January 1955	RAF Shaibah	de Havilland Venom FB.1	
No. 37 Squadron RAF	26 August 1946	16 September 1946	RAF Shallufa	Avro Lancaster B.7	
No. 39 Squadron RAF	26 February 1951	10 January 1955	RAF Luqa	de Havilland Mosquito NF.36 then Gloster Meteor NF.13	
No. 70 Squadron RAF	21 August 1946	17 September 1946	RAF Shallufa	Avro Lancaster B.1(FE)	
No. 73 Squadron RAF	1 February 1952; 5 March 1952	29 February 1952; 6 June 1952	RAF Ta Kali	de Havilland Vampire FB.9	
No. 78 Squadron RAF	19 September 1946 13 April 1950	2 March 1950 21 February 1951	RAF Mogadishu RAF Fayid	Douglas Dakota Vickers Valetta C.1	
No. 114 (Hong Kong) Squadron RAF	1 August 1947	21 February 1951	RAF Fayid	Douglas Dakota then Vickers Valetta C.1	Reformed here
No. 204 Squadron RAF	1 August 1947	22 February 1951	RAF Fayid	Douglas Dakota then Vickers Valetta C.1	Reformed here
No. 208 Squadron RAF	19 February 1951	16 September 1951	RAF Nicosia	Supermarine Spitfire FR.18 then Gloster Meteor FR.9	
No. 215 Squadron RAF	1 August 1947 23 November 1947	31 October 1947 1 May 1948	RAF Aqir N/A	Douglas Dakota	Reformed here Disbanded
No. 216 Squadron RAF	14 February 1947	26 February 1951	RAF Fayid	Douglas Dakota then Vickers Valetta C.1	
No. 219 (Mysore) Squadron RAF	1 March 1951	1 September 1954	N/A	de Havilland Mosquito NF.36 then Gloster Meteor NF.13	Reformed here Disbanded here
No. 683 Squadron RAF	26 February 1951	23 April 1951	RAF Eastleigh	Vickers Valetta C.1	

After the war, Kabrit remained an RAF station, hosting transport squadrons, five circa 1946. This continued until the breakdown in relations between the British and Egyptian governments in 1956, when the decision was taken to pull out British forces from the Suez Canal Zone.

The airfield was taken over by the Egyptian Air Force and renamed "Kibrit", becoming one of its main airfields. During the 1956 Suez Crisis, it was an airfield for 20 Squadron EAF, equipped with twelve Soviet-built Mikoyan-Gurevich MiG-15 aircraft. During the 1967 Arab-Israeli War, the station was attacked by the Israeli Air Force, and many of its Soviet-built Mikoyan-Gurevich MiG-17 aircraft were destroyed on the ramp by the IAF's Dassault Mystère IVs. In the 1973 Yom Kippur War with Israel, the airfield was captured by Israeli ground forces that crossed the Suez Canal along with Kasfreet and Shalufa Airfields, however it was not used by the Israeli Air Force.

Kibrit remains an Egyptian Air Force base. Currently, the airfield houses an SA-342 Gazelle unit. Its main runways are having their asphalt removed, but the hangars are still being used for housing the helicopters.

== See also ==
- List of former Royal Air Force stations
- List of North African airfields during World War II
