= Montalto Di Castro Airfield =

Abandoned WWII airfield in Italy

Montalto Di Castro Airfield
- Part of Twelfth Air Force

Site information
- Type: Military airfield
- Controlled by: United States Army Air Forces

Location
- Coordinates: 42°22′27.58″N 011°36′05.07″E

Site history
- Built: 1944
- In use: 1944

Location of Montalto Di Castro Airfield, Italy

Montalto Di Castro Airfield is an abandoned World War II military airfield in Italy, located approximately 16 km southwest of Canino, in the province of Viterbo (northern Lazio) in the internal part of Maremma Laziale, 90 km north-northwest of Rome.

It was an all-weather temporary field built by the United States Army Air Force XII Engineer Command using a graded earth compacted surface, with a prefabricated hessian (burlap) surfacing known as PHS. PHS was made of an asphalt-impregnated jute which was rolled out over the compacted surface over a square mesh track (SMT) grid of wire joined in 3-inch squares. Pierced Steel Planking was also used for parking areas, as well as for dispersal sites, when it was available. In addition, tents were used for billeting and also for support facilities; an access road was built to the existing road infrastructure; a dump for supplies, ammunition, and gasoline drums, along with a drinkable water and minimal electrical grid for communications and station lighting.

Once completed it was turned over for use by the Twelfth Air Force 324th Fighter Group, 14 June and 19 July 1944, P-40 Warhawk

During the Invasion of Southern France (Operation Dragoon), the airfield may have been used by elements of the 314th Troop Carrier Group in mid-August 1944

After the Americans moved out the airfield was dismantled. Today, traces of the runway are visible in aerial photographs, but the landscape is predominantly agriculture which has erased the remainder of the airfield.
