= Le Banca Airfield =

Abandoned military airfield near Naples

Le Banca Airfield
- Part of Twelfth Air Force

Site information
- Type: Military airfield
- Controlled by: United States Army Air Forces

Location
- Coordinates: 41°15′11.51″N 014°30′20.90″E (Approximate)

Site history
- Built: 1943
- In use: 1943-1944

Location of Le Banca Airfield, Italy

Le Banca Airfield is an abandoned World War II military airfield in Italy, located approximately 14 km northeast of Caiazzo, in the province of Caserta (Campania), 30 km north-northeast of Naples.

It was an all-weather temporary field built by the United States Army Air Force XII Engineer Command using a graded earth compacted surface, with a prefabricated hessian (burlap) surfacing known as PHS. PHS was made of an asphalt-impregnated jute which was rolled out over the compacted surface over a square mesh track (SMT) grid of wire joined in 3-inch squares. Pierced Steel Planking was also used for parking areas, as well as for dispersal sites, when it was available. In addition, tents were used for billeting and also for support facilities; an access road was built to the existing road infrastructure; a dump for supplies, ammunition, and gasoline drums, along with a drinkable water and minimal electrical grid for communications and station lighting.

Once completed it was turned over for use by the Twelfth Air Force fighter groups:

- 27th Fighter Group, 7–12 June 1944, P-40 Warhawk
- 324th Fighter Group, 6–14 June 1944, P-40 Warhawk

After the fighters moved out the airfield was dismantled. Today, there are no remaining traces of the airfield as the area as the land has been reclaimed by agriculture. It is unknown precisely where the airfield was actually located due to the changed landscape over the past 60 years.
