= Lunéville-Croismare Airport =

Lunéville-Croismare Airport Advanced Landing Ground (ALG) Y-2
- IATA: none; ICAO: LFQC

Summary
- Airport type: Civil
- Location: Croismare, France
- Elevation AMSL: 790 ft / 241 m
- Coordinates: 48°35′35.79″N 006°32′36.44″E

Map
- Location of Lunéville-Croismare Airport

Runways
Direction	Length		Surface
Direction	m	ft	Surface
09/27	1,039	3,410	Paved

Lunéville-Croismare Airport (ICAO: LFQC) is an airport in France, located approximately 3 km (2 miles) east-southeast of Lunéville in the Meurthe-et-Moselle department. The airport is used for general aviation, with no commercial airline service.

== History ==
The airbase was constructed during World War II, as an all-weather temporary field, built by the United States Army Air Forces XII Engineer Command during December 1944, after German forces were removed from the area. It was built on a graded surface using Pierced Steel Planking for runways and parking areas, as well as for dispersal sites. In addition, tents were used for billeting and also for support facilities; an access road was built to the existing road infrastructure, plus a dump for supplies, ammunition, and gasoline drums, along with drinkable water and a minimal electrical grid for communications and station lighting. The airfield was known as Lunéville Airfield or Advanced Landing Ground Y-2.

It was turned over for operational use by the Twelfth Air Force on December 25, 1944. The 324th Fighter Group flew P-47 Thunderbolts from the airfield from January through May 1945.

With the end of the war in Europe in May 1945, the Americans began to withdraw their aircraft and personnel. Control of the airfield was turned over to French authorities on May 29, 1945.

In 1950-1951 when as a result of the Cold War threat of the Soviet Union, the airfield at Lunéville was proposed by the United States Air Force to become a NATO fighter airbase, as part of a NATO commitment to establish a modern air force base at the site. In the ongoing negotiations, the site was ultimately rejected.

== See also ==
- Advanced Landing Ground
