= Menzel Heurr Airfield =

Abandoned WWII military airfield in Tunisia

Menzel Heurr Airfield
- Part of Ninth Air Force

Site information
- Type: Military airfield
- Controlled by: United States Army Air Forces

Location
- Coordinates: 36°45′40.85″N 010°56′42.02″E

Site history
- Built: 1943
- In use: 1943

Location of Menzel Heurr Airfield, Tunisia

Menzel Heurr Airfield is an abandoned World War II military airfield in Tunisia, located approximately 22 km north-northeast of Korba and 60 km east-southeast of Tunis. It was a temporary airfield built for fighter and light bomber use by the United States Army Air Force Ninth Air Force during the North African Campaign.

The airfield was used primarily by the 324th Fighter Group, which flew Curtiss P-40 Warhawks from the airfield in August 1943. After the Americans moved out, the airfield was dismantled and abandoned. Today, the remains of the main runway can be seen in aerial photography.
