= Cercola Airfield =

Military airfield in Campania, Italy

Cercola Airfield
- Part of Twelfth Air Force

Site information
- Type: Military Airfield
- Controlled by: United States Army Air Forces

Location
- Coordinates: 40°51′41.75″N 014°20′57.82″E (Approximate)

Site history
- Built: 1943
- In use: 1943-1944

Location of Cercola Airfield, Italy

Cercola Airfield is an abandoned World War II military airfield in Italy, located approximately 2 km north of Cercola in the Province of Naples in the Italian region Campania.

It was an all-weather temporary field built by the United States Army Air Force IX Engineer Command using a graded earth compacted surface, with a prefabricated hessian (burlap) surfacing known as PHS. PHS was made of an asphalt-impregnated jute which was rolled out over the compacted surface over a square mesh track (SMT) grid of wire joined in 3-inch squares. Pierced Steel Planking was also used for parking areas, as well as for dispersal sites, when it was available. In addition, tents were used for billeting and also for support facilities; an access road was built to the existing road infrastructure; a dump for supplies, ammunition, and gasoline drums, along with a drinkable water and minimal electrical grid for communications and station lighting.

Once completed it was turned over for use by the Ninth Air Force 324th Fighter Group, which arrived at the airfield on 25 October 1943 flying P-40 Warhawks. The 324th was reassigned to XII Air Support Command on 1 November 1943, and remained at Cercola until 6 May 1944, when it moved to Pignataro Maggiore.

The 33d Fighter Group operated P-40 Warhawks from the field between 1 January and February 1944, supporting ground forces as they advanced and attacking enemy aircraft on the air and ground. At Cercola, the group was reassigned to Tenth Air Force and moved east to India. It was replaced by the 57th Fighter Group, also flying P-40s, which operated from the field until the end of March.

After the 324th moved out in May 1944 the airfield was dismantled. Today, there are no remaining traces of the airfield as the area around the town of Cercola has grown substantially since the war and is now part of the Naples urban area. The urban development has obliterated any trace of the airfield. It is unknown precisely where the airfield was actually located due to the changed landscape over the past 60 years.
