= Dole–Jura Airport =

Dole–Jura Airport Aéroport de Dole-Jura
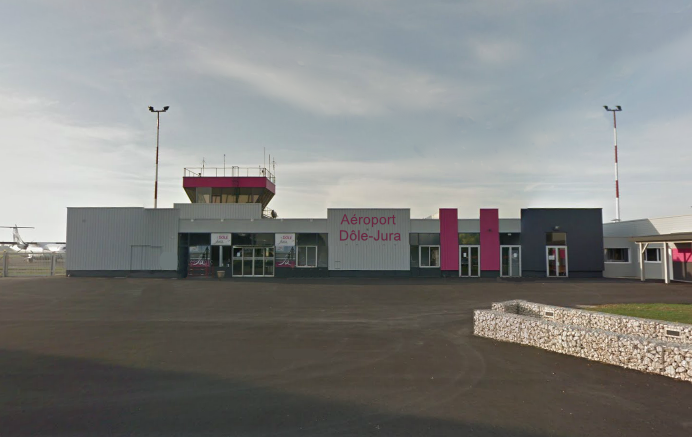
- IATA: DLE; ICAO: LFGJ

Summary
- Airport type: Public
- Operator: CCI du Jura
- Serves: Besançon; Dijon; Dole
- Location: Tavaux, Jura, France
- Elevation AMSL: 645 ft (197 m)
- Coordinates: 47°02′34″N 005°26′06″E
- Website: dole.aeroport.fr

Map
- Location of airport in Bourgogne-Franche-Comté region LFGJ (France)

Runways
Direction	Length		Surface
Direction	m	ft	Surface
05/23	2,230	9,186	Asphalt
- Sources: French AIP, UAF,

Dole–Jura Airport (French: Aéroport de Dole-Jura) (IATA: DLE, ICAO: LFGJ), also known as Dole–Besançon–Dijon Airport (Aéroport de Dole-Besançon-Dijon), is an airport serving Dole, a commune in the Jura department in the Bourgogne-Franche-Comté region in eastern France. The airport is located 7 km (4 NM) southwest of Dole, and southeast of Tavaux. It was formerly known as Dole–Tavaux Airport. The airport is used for general aviation, and for a few commercial airline services.

== History ==
During World War II, the airport was used by the German Luftwaffe during the occupation of France as an Air intelligence training facility (Luftnachrichten-Ausbildungs-Regiment 302). It was attacked by the United States Army Air Force on several occasions in the spring of 1944. After the airfield was liberated by Allied forces in early September 1944, the United States Army Air Forces IX Engineer Command repaired the airfield and made it ready for operational use by combat units. The field was made ready by 15 September. It was known as Dole/Tavaux Airfield or Advanced Landing Ground Y-7. Units that were assigned to the airfield were:

- 324th Fighter Group, 20 September 1944 – 4 January 1945, Republic P-47 Thunderbolt (12th AF)
- 371st Fighter Group, 1 October-20 December 1944, P-47 Thunderbolt, (9th AF)
- 320th Bombardment Group, 1 April-18 June 1945, Martin B-26 Marauder (12th AF)

With the end of the war in Europe in May 1945, the Americans began to withdraw their aircraft and personnel. Control of the airport was returned to French civil authorities on 17 July 1945.

Today, the airport's World War II history remains with the alert pads built by the Germans at each end of the main runway. What appears to be a weapons storage facility is located to the northeast of the airfield, along with some deteriorating concrete wartime taxiways. In some agricultural fields to the south of the main runway appear to be dispersal taxiways and what once was an aircraft maintenance area with covered hangars constructed in woods. The taxiways are now being reduced in width to single-lane agricultural roads

== Facilities ==
The airport resides at an elevation of 645 feet (197 m) above mean sea level. It has one paved runway designated 05/23 which measures 2,230 by 45 metres (7,316 ft × 148 ft). It also has a parallel runway with a grass surface measuring 800 by 50 metres (2,625 ft × 164 ft).

== Airlines and destinations ==
The following airlines operate regular scheduled and charter flights at Dole–Jura Airport:

Airlines	Destinations
Air Corsica	Seasonal: Ajaccio, Bastia
Ryanair	Fès, Marrakesh, Porto

== See also ==
- Advanced Landing Ground
