= Pignataro Maggiore Airfield =

Italian airfield

Pignataro Maggiore Airfield
- Part of Twelfth Air Force

Site information
- Type: Military airfield

Location
- Coordinates: 41°11′46.39″N 014°09′48.48″E (Approximate)

Site history
- Built: unknown
- In use: Currently in use

Location of Pignataro Maggiore Airfield, Italy

Pignataro Maggiore Airfield is a grass airfield just north of Pignataro Maggiore, in the Province of Caserta in the Italian region of Campania, located about 40 km north of Naples. It is currently used for light private aircraft.

It was an all-weather temporary field built by the United States Army Air Force XII Engineer Command using a graded earth compacted surface, with a prefabricated hessian (burlap) surfacing known as PHS. PHS was made of an asphalt-impregnated jute which was rolled out over the compacted surface over a square mesh track (SMT) grid of wire joined in 3-inch squares. Pierced Steel Planking was also used for parking areas, as well as for dispersal sites, when it was available. In addition, tents were used for billeting and also for support facilities; an access road was built to the existing road infrastructure; a dump for supplies, ammunition, and gasoline drums, along with a drinkable water and minimal electrical grid for communications and station lighting.

Once completed it was turned over for use by the Twelfth Air Force 324th Fighter Group from 6 May until 6 June 1944 as a fighter base, flying P-40 Warhawks.

Currently the airfield is still in use, with a large hangar and several buildings visible.
