= Aiken High School (South Carolina) =

Location
- 449 Rutland Dr; Aiken, South Carolina 29801; United States; 33°34′41″N 81°42′47″W

Information
- Type: Public
- Established: 1888 (138 years ago)
- School district: Aiken County Public Schools
- CEEB code: 410025
- Principal: Angela Moore
- Teaching staff: 76.00 (on an FTE basis)
- Grades: 9–12
- Enrollment: 1,254 (2023-2024)
- Student to teacher ratio: 16.50
- Campus size: 50 acres (20 ha)
- Campus type: Suburban
- Colors: Green and gold
- Nickname: Hornets
- Yearbook: Hornet
- Website: www.acpsd.net/o/ahs

Aiken High School is a four-year public high school located in Aiken, South Carolina, United States. It is a part of Aiken County Public School District.

== History ==
Aiken High School was founded in 1888 by the General Assembly of the State of South Carolina, and named Aiken Institute. In 1935, the name was changed to Aiken High School. In 1955, Windsor High School of Windsor, South Carolina consolidated with Aiken High School.

== Athletics ==
=== State championships ===
- Basketball - Girls: 1975
- Football: 1992
- Golf - Boys: 1952, 1953, 1975
- Tennis - Boys: 1996
- Track - Boys: 1950
- Volleyball: 2010, 2016, 2022

== Notable alumni ==
- Leon Lott (1971) – commander of the South Carolina State Guard and Sheriff of Richland County, South Carolina
- William "the Refrigerator" Perry (1981) – NFL defensive tackle, Super Bowl XX Champion
- Diron Reynolds (1989) – football coach
- Jamal Reynolds (1997) – NFL player

== See also ==
- List of high schools in South Carolina
