= 169th Fighter Wing =

Unit of the South Carolina Air National Guard

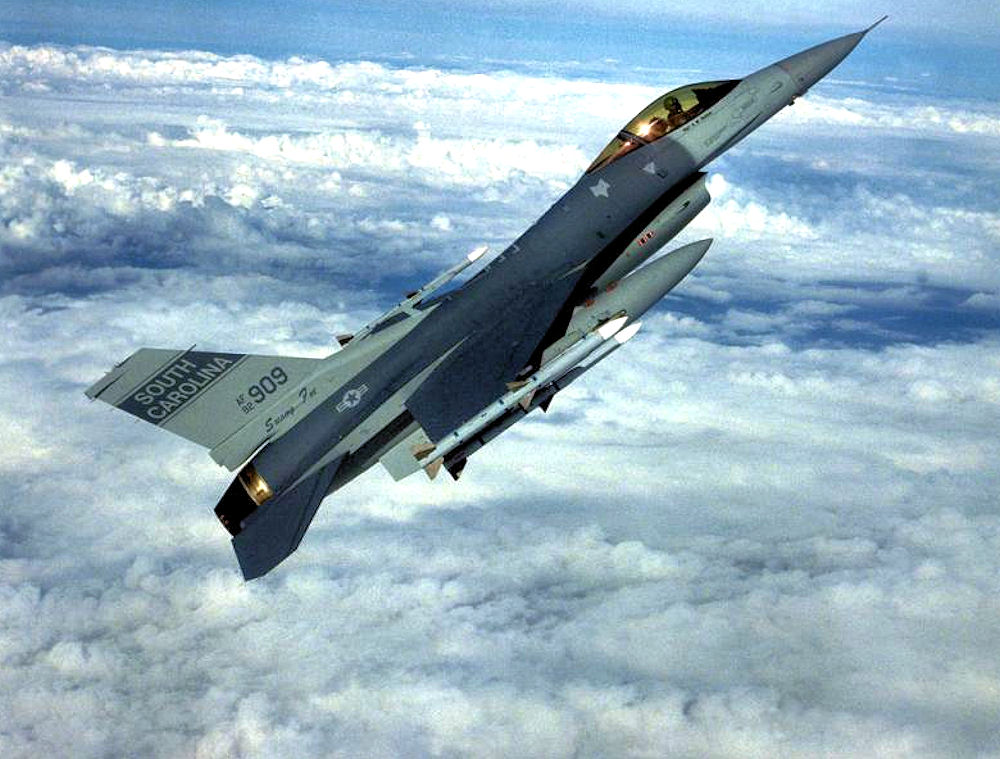
- An F-16C of the 169th Fighter Wing (Note: Fighter jet belongs to the 157th Fighter Squadron)
- Active: 1957–present
- Country: United States
- Allegiance: South Carolina
- Branch: Air National Guard
- Type: Squadron
- Role: Tactical Fighter
- Part of: South Carolina Air National Guard
- Garrison/HQ: McEntire Joint National Guard Base, Eastover, South Carolina
- Nickname: Swamp Foxes
- Decorations: Air Force Outstanding Unit Award

Insignia
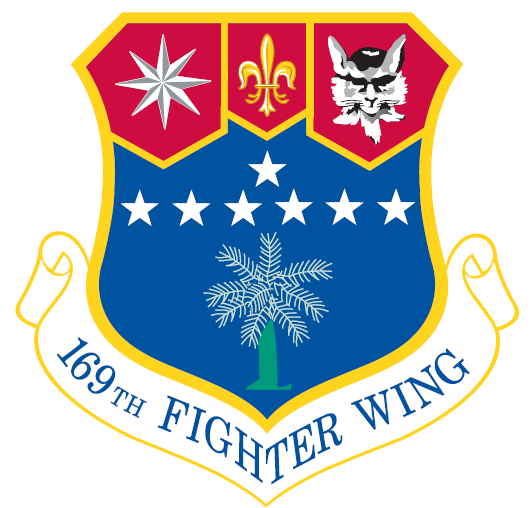
- 169th Fighter Wing emblem

The 169th Fighter Wing (169 FW) is a unit of the South Carolina Air National Guard, stationed at McEntire Joint National Guard Base in Eastover, near Columbia, South Carolina. As the primary flying wing of the South Carolina Air National Guard, it operates the F-16 Fighting Falcon and is widely known by its nickname, the "Swamp Foxes."

The wing's primary federal mission is the Suppression of Enemy Air Defenses (SEAD), utilizing specialized Block 52 F-16C/D aircraft, often referred to as "Wild Weasels." The 169 FW is a component of the Air Combat Command (ACC) and is notable for hosting the largest Active Associate program in the United States' Combat Air Forces, which integrates active-duty United States Air Force personnel directly into the Guard unit's operations.

Established in 1957 as the 169th Fighter-Interceptor Group, the wing has participated in numerous major conflicts, including Operation Desert Storm, Operation Iraqi Freedom, and Operation Enduring Freedom. Under Title 32, the wing also maintains a state mission, providing support to the Governor of South Carolina during natural disasters and domestic emergencies.

== Mission ==
The wing's primary federal mission in accordance with Title 10 USC is to maintain US wartime readiness and the ability to mobilize and deploy quickly to carry out tactical air missions or combat support activities in the event of a war or military emergency. More specifically, the wing specializes in the Suppression of Enemy Air Defenses (SEAD). The SCANG operates as part of the combined military force of the U.S. military and is fully integrated with the active duty U.S. Air Force to perform its military mission.

The wing operates the F-16 Fighting Falcon, a single-seat, multipurpose fighter, capable of performing both air-to-air and air-to-ground tactical missions. The 169th had previously flown the F-16A from 1983 to 1994, and in 1994, transitioned to the single-seat F-16C Block 52 (and a small number of twin-seat F-16D Block 52), also known as the F-16CJ, a version specialized in the Wild Weasel mission.

The SCANG's state mission under Title 32 USC is to respond to the call of the Governor of South Carolina in the event of natural disasters or domestic disturbances within the state of South Carolina.

Approximately 900 personnel assigned to the SCANG are traditional Guard members who leave their full-time civilian jobs, including workers and students who train part-time with the Air National Guard. Approximately another 300 are federal employees serving as full-time Air Reserve Technicians (ART) at McEntire, who drill with their respective Air Guard units, primarily those that are part of the 169 FW. Close to 50 South Carolina state employees also work at McEntire, some of whom are either active or retired members of the Air National Guard. An additional 150 active duty USAF personnel who are Regular Air Force and Active Guard and Reserve (AGR) members round out the SCANG's Total Force fighter wing. McEntire is home to the largest Active Associate program between the Regular Air Force and the Air National Guard in the US's Combat Air Forces.

== Units ==
The 169th Fighter Wing consists of the following units:

- 169th Operations Group

157th Fighter Squadron "Swamp Foxes" (Lockheed Martin F-16CJ/DJ Fighting Falcon)
316th Fighter Squadron – Attached active associate (F-16CJ/DJ Fighting Falcon)
169th Operations Support Flight

- 169th Maintenance Group

169th Aircraft Maintenance Squadron
169th Maintenance Squadron
169th Maintenance Operations Flight

- 169th Mission Support Group

169th Civil Engineering Squadron
169th Security Forces Squadron
169th Logistics Readiness Squadron
169th Force Support Squadron
169th Communications Squadron

- 169th Medical Group
- 245th Air Traffic Control Squadron
- Det 1, 20th Operations Group
- Det 2, 20th Maintenance Operations Squadron

== History ==
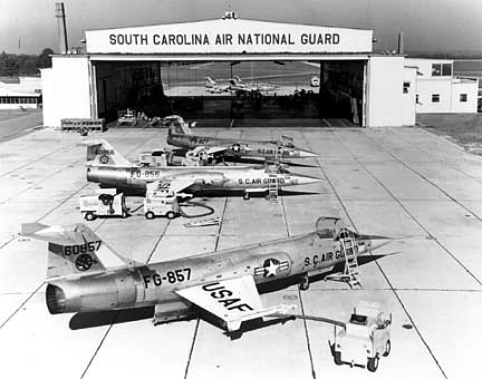
F-104A Starfighters of the 169th Fighter-Interceptor Group, 1960

On September 5, 1957, the South Carolina Air National Guard 157th Fighter-Bomber Squadron was authorized to expand to a group level, and the 169th Fighter-Interceptor Group was established by the National Guard Bureau. The 157th was re-designated as a Fighter-Interceptor squadron and became the group's flying squadron. Other squadrons assigned into the group were the 169th Headquarters, 169th Material Squadron (Maintenance), 169th Combat Support Squadron, and the 169th USAF Dispensary.

Shortly afterwards, Air Defense Command upgraded the new 169th Group to the all-weather/day-night F-86L Sabre Interceptor aircraft. In 1960, the "Swamp Foxes" became one of only three Air National Guard units selected to operate the Mach-2 F-104A Starfighter interceptor.

On May 25, 1961, the unit’s first commander, Brigadier General Barnie B. McEntire Jr. died on May 25, 1961, when he piloted his malfunctioning F-104 Starfighter jet away from populated areas near Harrisburg, Pennsylvania before crashing into the Susquehanna River. On 1 October 1961, then-Governor Ernest F. Hollings presided over the ceremony, renaming the South Carolina installation from Congaree Air Base to McEntire Air National Guard Base in his honor.

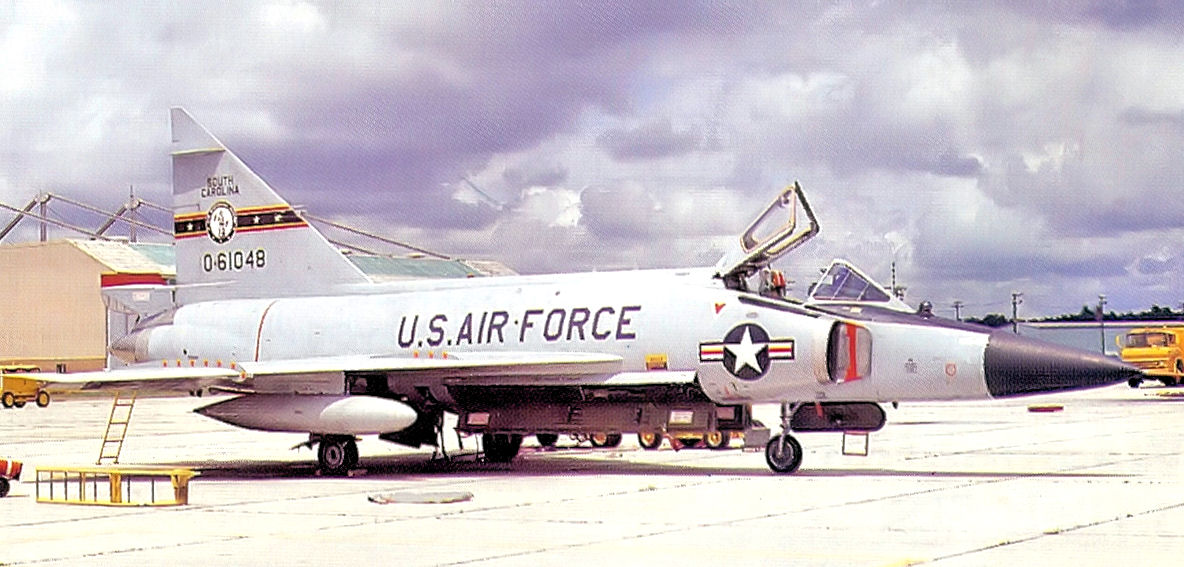
157th Fighter-Interceptor Squadron Convair F-102A Delta Dagger 56–1048, 1973.

The 169th was called into Active service in November 1961 as the construction of the Berlin Wall pushed the world to the brink of war. Within a month after mobilization, 750 personnel and 22 of the 157th FIS F-104 aircraft were placed at Morón Air Base, Spain, as the unit took up flying daily air defense patrols as part of the NATO air defense force in Western Europe. With world tension easing, the squadron returned home in August 1962.

In June 1963 the F-104s were transferred back to the active-duty Air Force and sent to Homestead Air Force Base, Florida, where Air Defense Command was setting up a permanent presence after the Cuban Missile Crisis where the Starfighters would be better located for Air Defense against Soviet MiG fighters that were flown by the Cuban Air Force. The South Carolina ANG was re-equipped with the F-102A Delta Dagger, which was being replaced in the active duty interceptor force by the F-106. The Mach-2 "Deuce" served with the 169th FIG until April 1975, when Aerospace Defense Command was reducing the USAF interceptor force as the threat of Soviet Bombers attacking the United States was deemed remote.

=== Tactical Air Command ===
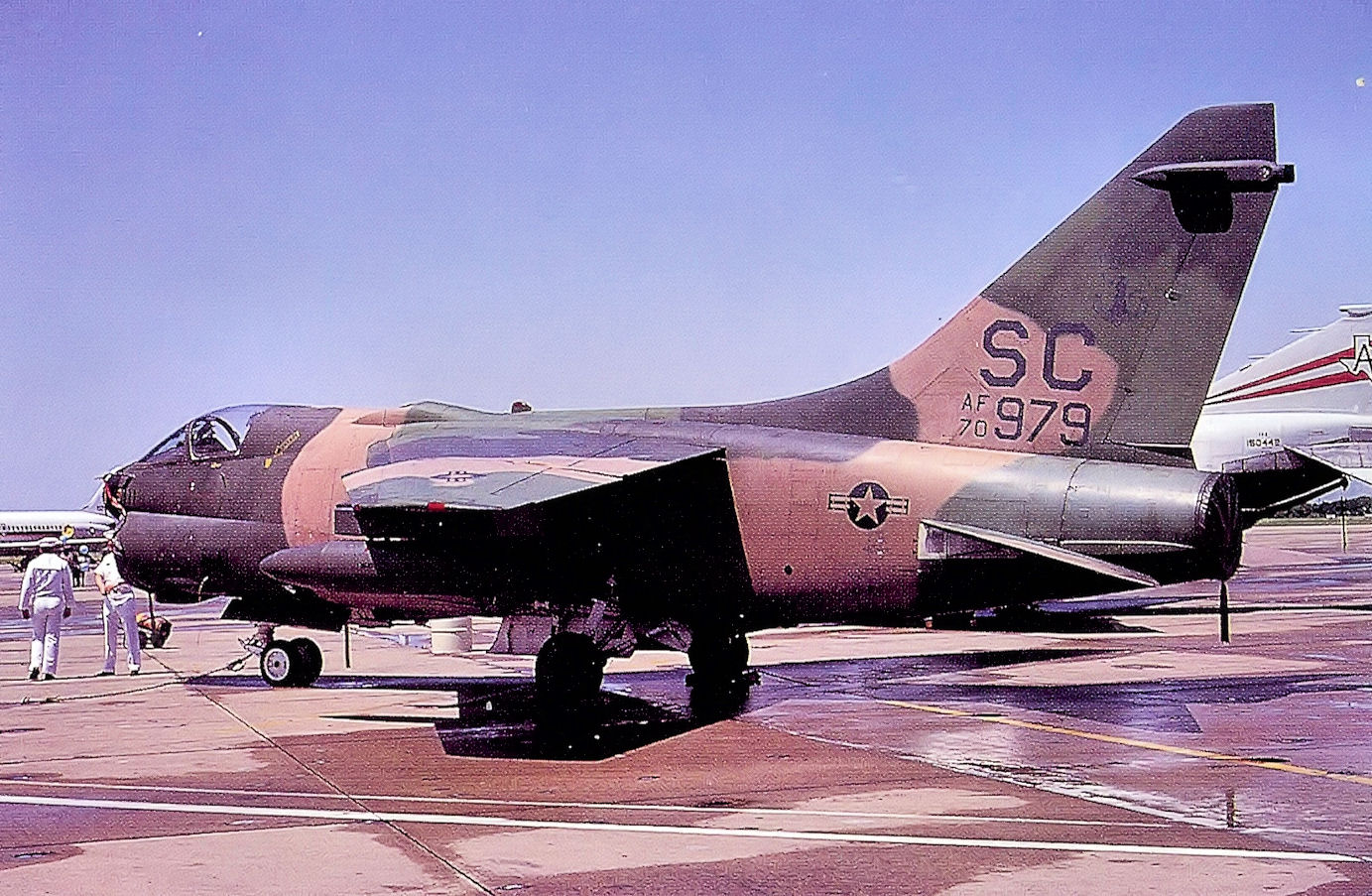
A-7D 70–0979, 157th Tactical Fighter Squadron, about 1980

With the phase-down of continental air defenses in the 1970s, the 169th was transferred to Tactical Air Command (TAC), and was re-designated a Tactical Fighter Group. The 157th Tactical Fighter Squadron began to receive A-7D Corsair II subsonic tactical close Air Support aircraft from Tactical Air Command units that were preparing to receive the new A-10 Thunderbolt II. The unit received its aircraft from the 354th TFW at Myrtle Beach AFB and the 355th TFW at Davis-Monthan AFB, Arizona. The aircraft utilized an automatic electronic navigation and weapons delivery system. Although designed primarily as a ground attack aircraft, it also had limited air-to-air combat capability. In 1982, the 157th received new twin-seat A-7K trainers.

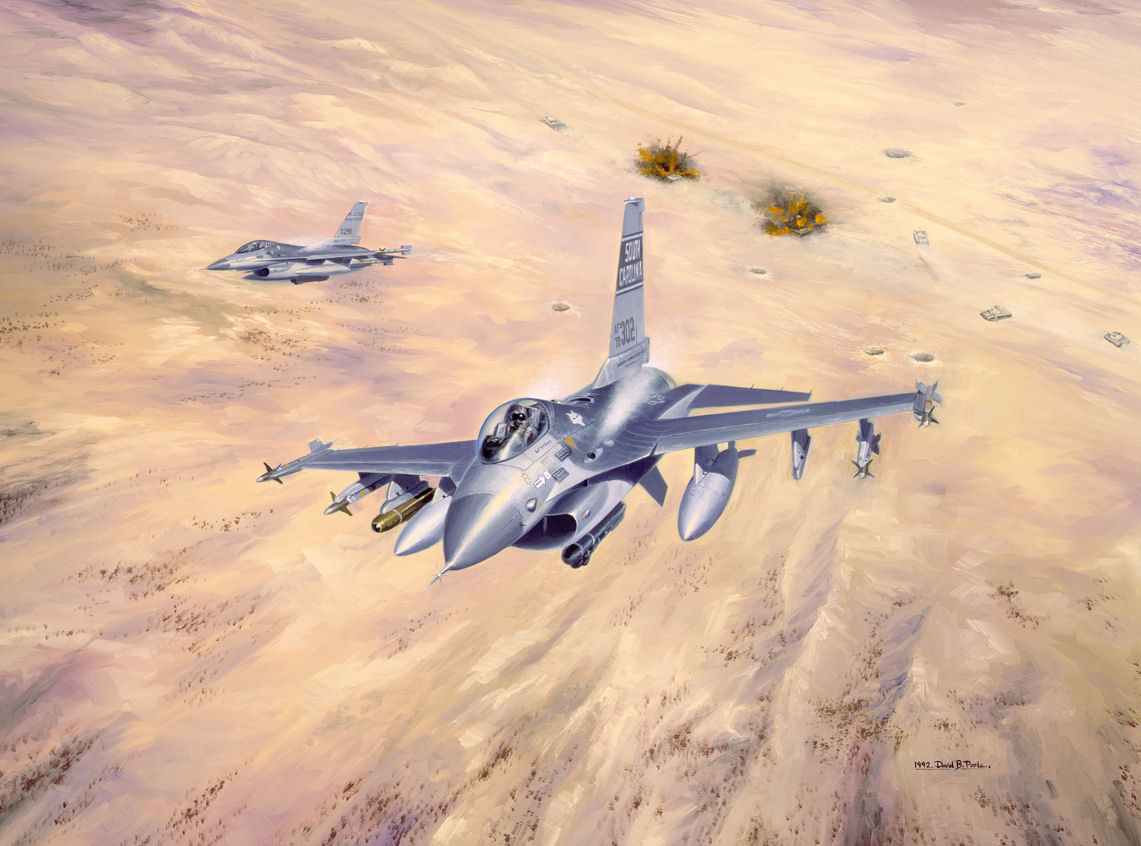
Swamp Foxes in Operation Desert Storm, Air National Guard Art, 1992

In the early 1980s, the South Carolina congressional delegation in Congress, led by Senators Strom Thurmond and Ernest Hollings, pressured the Department of Defense to upgrade Army and Air National Guard units with modern equipment to better supplement the Active Duty forces as part of the "Total Force" concept. Specifically, Thurmond and Hollings wanted the Air Force to equip the South Carolina ANG with the new F-16 Fighting Falcon, which was, at the time, just being introduced into the active duty force of Tactical Air Command. Beginning in July 1983, some of the initial Block 1 and Block 5 F-16As were transferred to the 169th Tactical Fighter Group, being the first Air National Guard unit to receive the aircraft. Its A-7Ds were subsequently reassigned to other Air National Guard units. Later, BF-16A/B Block 10 were delivered by the Air Force to the 157th TFS. By the mid-eighties, all the F-16s received by the 169th had undergone Pacer Loft modification bringing them up to the same block 10 standards.

With the equipment change to the F-16, the 169th was assigned to the air defense mission again under Air Defense, Tactical Air Command (ADTAC), which was established when TAC assumed the Aerospace Defense Command mission in 1979. In addition, although the F-16s weren't adapted to perform in the tactical close air support mission that the A-7D was utilized for, the 157th TFS did practice the conventional attack role with Mark 82 (Mk 82) and Mark 84 (Mk 84) gliding bombs. The 157th TFS won the Gunsmoke '89 aerial gunnery competition, placing first place out of 15 other teams.

In December 1990, during the buildup for war during Operation Desert Shield, the 157th was federalized for the third time and was deployed to Prince Sultan Air Base, Al Kharj, Saudi Arabia just a year and a half after taking first place at Gunsmoke '89. The 157th Tactical Fighter Squadron (Provisional) flew a total of 1,729 combat sorties during Operation Desert Storm, a total mission rate of over 90% was achieved.

=== Post Cold War era ===
169th Fighter Wing F-16C Fighting Falcon at the Marrakech, Morocco airport (Note: Aircraft is General Dynamics F-16C Block 52Q Fighting Falcon, serial 93-0535, taken on 23 January 2010.)

Early in the 1990s with the declared end of the Cold War and the continued decline in military budgets, the Air Force restructured to meet changes in strategic requirements, decreasing personnel, as well as infrastructure. The 169th adopted the new USAF "Objective Organization" in early 1992, with the word "tactical" being eliminated from its designation and becoming the 169th Fighter Group. Tactical Air Command was inactivated on 1 June, being replaced by the new Air Combat Command (ACC).

In 1995, the 157th became the first Air National Guard unit to receive new Block 52 F-16C/D aircraft.The mission profile of the unit changed in the way that they became a multi-role squadron being able to perform all kind of missions. More specifically they also received the HARM Targeting System being able to fly anti-radar sorties with the AGM-88 anti-radar missile.

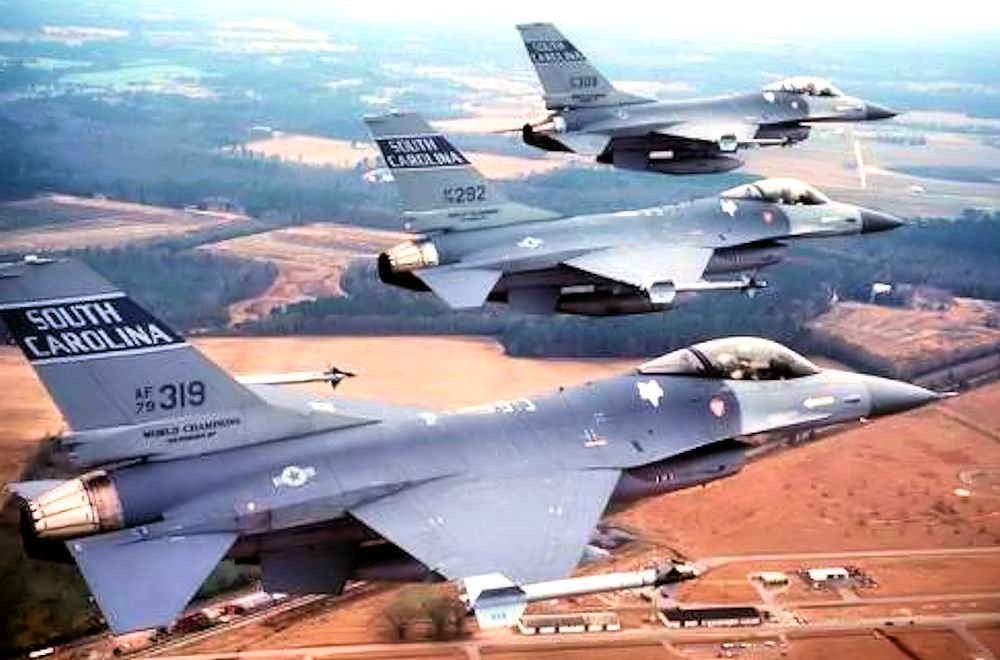
157th Tactical Fighter Squadron – 3 F-16A Formation – 1989

The main mission profile of the squadron, therefore, changed to that of Suppression of Enemy Air Defenses (SEAD). The 157th Fighter Squadron continues to fly the SEAD mission today. Also, on 11 October 1995, ACC and the National Guard Board authorized expanding the status of the 169th to the Wing level, and the 157th Fighter Squadron became part of the new 169th Operations Group under the new 169th Fighter Wing.

In mid-1996, the Air Force, in response to budget cuts, and changing world situations, began experimenting with Air Expeditionary organizations. The Air Expeditionary Force (AEF) concept was developed that would mix Active-Duty, Reserve and Air National Guard elements into a combined force. Instead of entire permanent units deploying as "Provisional" as in the 1991 Gulf War, Expeditionary units are composed of "aviation packages" from several wings, including active-duty Air Force, the Air Force Reserve Command and the Air National Guard would be married together to carry out the assigned deployment rotation.

In February 1997, the 157th Expeditionary Fighter Squadron was first formed from 162nd Wing personnel and aircraft and deployed to Doha International Airport, Qatar, to join with other active-duty and national guard squadrons as part of Operation Southern Watch. This mission was initiated mainly to cover for attacks by Iraqi forces on the Iraqi Shi’ite Muslims. This made the 169th the first Air National Guard unit to deploy alongside active-duty Air Force units to comprise an Air Expeditionary Force (AEF).

The 157th was activated again in January 2000 as a component of Operation Northern Watch; a United States European Command Combined Task Force (CTF) who was responsible for enforcing the United Nations mandated no-fly zone above the 36th parallel in Iraq. This mission was a successor to Operation Provide Comfort, which also entailed support for the Iraqi Kurds. The deployment was completed in April 2000. The 157th EFS was formed again in March 2001, when the unit deployed to Prince Sultan Air Base, Saudi Arabia in a second Operation Southern Watch deployment. The guardsmen returned to McEntire JGB in July.

=== Global war on terrorism ===
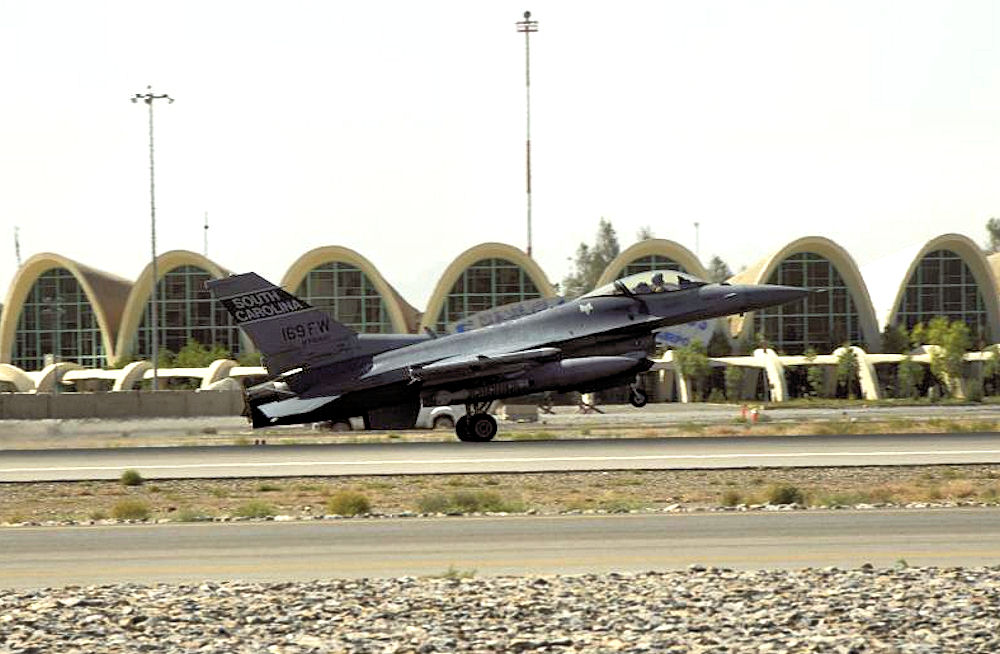
157th Expeditionary Fighter Squadron F-16C returns to Kandahar Airfield after flying a mission in support of OEF] (Note: Aircraft is General Dynamics F-16C block 52 Fighting Falcon, serial 93-0549 Taken on 1 June 2012.)

In 2002, aircraft and personnel from the 169th deployed to Southwest Asia in support of Operation Enduring Freedom (OEF) and participated directly in combat operations. Also that year, 50 South Carolina ANG airmen, then assigned to the 240th Combat Communications Squadron, deployed to Central Asia for six months in support of the global war on terrorism, and the 245th ATCS deployed to Afghanistan in support of Operation Enduring Freedom.

In 2003, nearly 400 Airmen from the 169th and all its F-16s were mobilized and deployed to Southwest Asia as part of what became Operation Iraqi Freedom (OIF). The 169th was attached to the 379th Air Expeditionary Wing, stationed at Al' Udeid Air Base in Qatar, and flew more than 400 combat missions performing the Suppression and Destruction of Enemy Air Defenses mission and flying numerous precision bombing missions over Iraq.

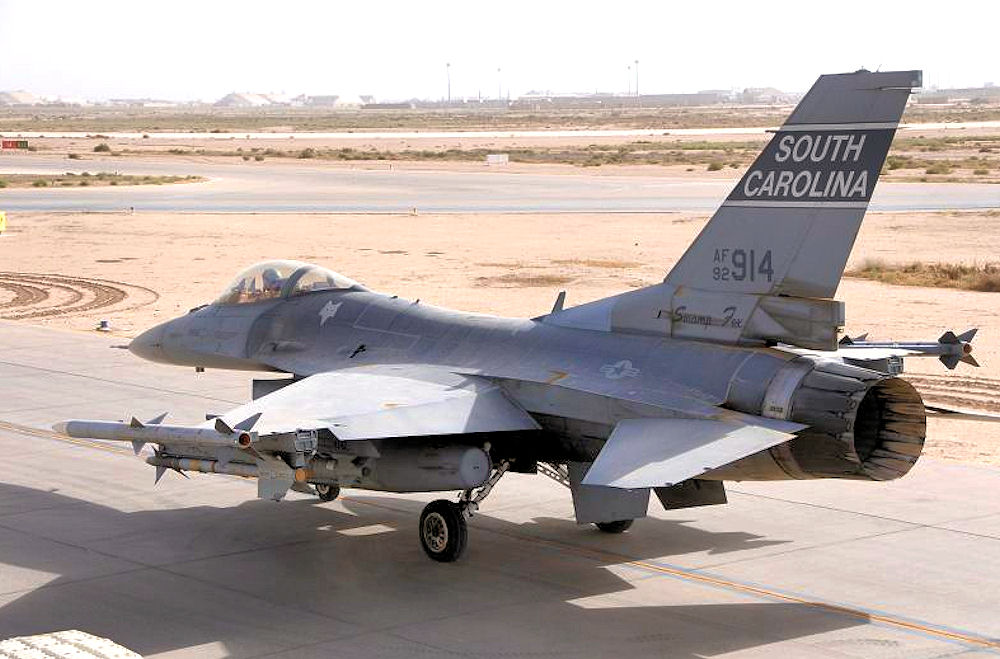
157th EFS F-16C 92–3914 at Balad AB, Iraq, 2010

In 2005, the Base Realignment and Closure Commission announced a historic expansion at McEntire. Five more Block 52 F-16s from the active-duty USAF would arrive at the base in 2006 and five more the following year. Then, in 2007, active duty Air Force personnel began arriving at McEntire as the base prepared to host and operate the largest Active Association unit in the US's Combat Air Forces, bringing about 150 active duty personnel on board to work, train and deploy with the 169th.

In May 2010, the 169th became the first Air National Guard unit to support an AEF mission for a full 120 days. While simultaneously deploying Airmen for Operation Enduring Freedom, the wing deployed more than 300 Airmen in support of Operation Iraqi Freedom, during which the 169th flew more than 800 combat air patrol missions over Iraq from Balad AB and other locations. The deployment allowed the 169th to escort the last Army combat forces out of Iraq on the last day of Operation Enduring Freedom.

Starting in October 2010, the 157th FS began an Air Sovereignty Alert mission at nearby Shaw AFB. The squadron has gradually taken over the duties of the 20th Fighter Wing. On 6 May 2011, the squadron completely took over the role when a new alert facility was built at McEntire Joint National Guard base.

Most recently, in April 2012, the 157th EFS was formed and deployed with pilots, maintenance specialists and support staffers. They provided air support to ground units from Kandahar Airfield, Afghanistan. Pilots flew more than 2,200 sorties for a total of 9,400 combat hours. The four-month deployment ended in late August.

As part of long-term modernization, the 169th has been identified as a candidate for transition to the F-35A Lightning II. to active-duty USAF units as the South Carolina ANG has a history of receiving the newest equipment when it becomes available.

== Lineage ==
- Established as the 169th Fighter Group (Air Defense) and allotted to the Air National Guard in 1957

Activated and extended federal recognition on 5 September 1957
Re-designated 169th Fighter-Interceptor Group in January 1972
Re-designated 169th Tactical Fighter Group on 1 April 1975
Re-designated 169th Fighter Group on 15 March 1992
Re-designated 169th Fighter Wing on 11 October 1995

=== Assignments ===
- 116th Fighter-Interceptor Wing, 5 September 1957
- 4500th Air Base Wing, November 1961
- 132D Air Defense Wing, August 1962
- 128th Fighter-Interceptor Wing (later 128th Tactical Fighter Wing, 128th Fighter Wing), January 1972
- South Carolina Air National Guard, 11 October 1995 – present

Gained by: Montgomery Air Defense Sector, Air Defense Command
Gained by: 35th Air Division, Air Defense Command, 1 April 1966
Gained by: 35th Air Division, Aerospace Defense Command, 15 January 1968
Gained by: 20th Air Division, Air Defense Command, 1 January 1970
Gained by: Tactical Air Command, 1 April 1975
Elements attached to: 4th Tactical Fighter Wing (Provisional), 29 December 1990 – 22 July 1991
Gained by: Air Combat Command, 1 June 1992 – present

=== Components ===
- 169th Operations Group, c. 1 March 1994 – present
- 157th Fighter-Interceptor Squadron (later 157th Tactical Fighter Squadron, 157th Fighter Squadron) 5 September 1957 – c. 1 March 1994

=== Stations ===
- Congaree Air Base (later McEntire Air National Guard Base), Columbia, South Carolina, 5 September 1957 – Present
- Langley Air Force Base, Virginia, November 1961
- McEntire Air National Guard Base (later McEntire Joint National Guard Base), Columbia, South Carolina, August 1962 – present

==== South Carolina Air National Guard deployments ====
- 1961 Berlin Crisis federalization

Operated from: Morón Air Base, Spain, 1 November 1961 – 15 August 1962

- 1990-1991 Gulf War federalization

Operated from: Prince Sultan Air Base, Al Kharj, Saudi Arabia, 29 December 1990 – 22 July 1991

- Operation Southern Watch

Operated from: Doha International Airport, Qatar, 26 February–March 1997

- Operation Northern Watch

Operated from: Incirlik Air Base, Turkey, January–April 2000

- Operation Southern Watch

Operated from: Prince Sultan Air Base, Saudi Arabia, March–July 2001

- Operation Enduring Freedom

Operated from: Al Udeid Air Base, Qatar, 8 January-3 April 2002

- Operation Iraqi Freedom

Operated from: Al Udeid Air Base, Qatar, February–August 2003
Operated from: Balad Air Base, Iraq, 14 May-27 August 2010

- Operation Enduring Freedom

Operated from: Kandahar Airfield, Afghanistan, 8 April-27 August 2012

=== Aircraft ===
- F-80C Shooting Star, 1957–1958
- F-86L Sabre Interceptor, 1958–1960
- F-104A/B Starfighter, 1960–1963
- F-102A Delta Dagger, 1963–1975
- A-7D Corsair II, 1974–1983
- Block 10 F-16A/B Fighting Falcon, 1983–1994 (Also some Block 1 and 5)
- Block 52 F-16C/D Fighting Falcon 1995 – present (F-16CJ)
- Lockheed WC-130H, 1998 – present

=== Decorations ===
- Air Force Outstanding Unit Award
