= South Carolina Air National Guard =

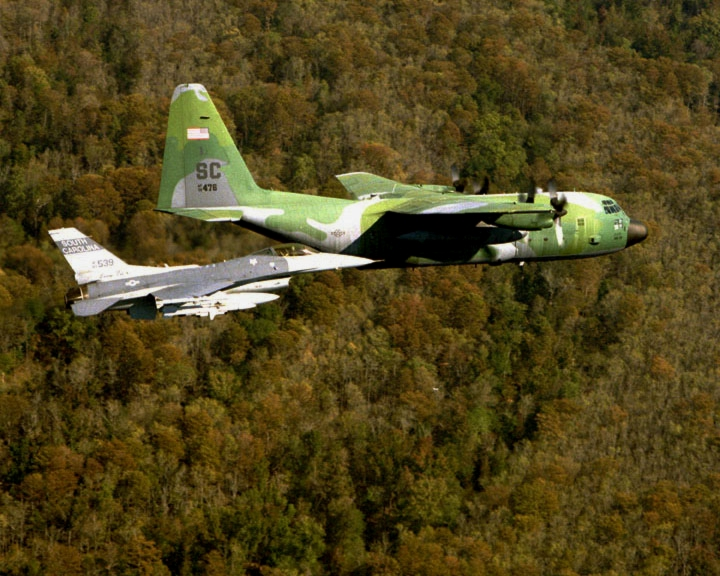
- An F-16C Fighting Falcon Block 52 of the 157th Fighter Squadron flies next to a Lockheed C-130H-LM Hercules from the 169th Operations Support Flight, 169th Fighter Wing. The 157th is the oldest unit in the South Carolina Air National Guard, having over 50 years of service to the state and nation.
- Active: 9 December 1946 - present
- Country: United States
- Allegiance: South Carolina
- Branch: Air National Guard
- Type: State militia, military reserve force
- Role: "To meet state and federal mission responsibilities."
- Part of: South Carolina National Guard; United States National Guard Bureau
- Garrison/HQ: South Carolina Air National Guard, 1 National Guard Road, Columbia, South Carolina, 29201

Commanders
- Civilian leadership: President Donald Trump (Commander-in-Chief); Gary A. Ashworth (Secretary of the Air Force); Governor Henry McMaster (Governor of the State of South Carolina)
- State military leadership: Major General Van McCarty

Insignia
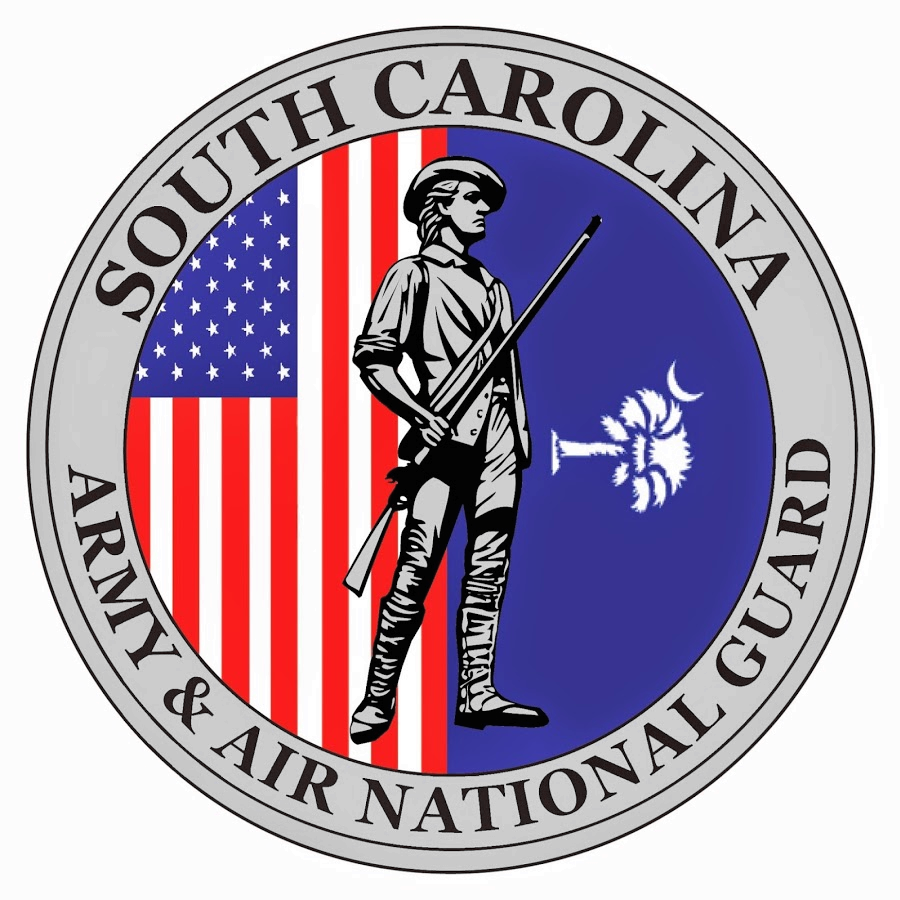
- Emblem of the South Carolina Air National Guard

Aircraft flown
- Fighter: F-16C/D Fighting Falcon

The South Carolina Air National Guard (SC ANG) is the aerial militia of the State of South Carolina, United States of America. It is a reserve of the United States Air Force and along with the South Carolina Army National Guard an element of the South Carolina National Guard of the larger United States National Guard Bureau.

As state military units, the units in the South Carolina Air National Guard are not in the normal United States Air Force chain of command. They are under the jurisdiction of the governor of South Carolina though the office of the South Carolina Adjutant General unless they are federalized by order of the president of the United States. The South Carolina Air National Guard is headquartered in Columbia under the command of the Assistant Adjutant General for Air, Brigadier General Russell A. Rushe, and ultimately reporting to the Army general officer serving as the Adjutant General of South Carolina, Major General Robin B. Stilwell. https://www.scguard.ng.mil/Leadership/Bio-Article-View/Article/3054650/major-general-robin-b-stilwell/

== Overview ==
Under the "Total Force" concept, South Carolina Air National Guard units are considered to be part of the Air Reserve Component (ARC) of the United States Air Force (USAF). South Carolina ANG units are trained and equipped by the Air Force and are operationally gained by a major command of the USAF if federalized. In addition, the South Carolina Air National Guard forces are assigned to Air Expeditionary Forces and are subject to deployment tasking orders along with their active duty and Air Force Reserve counterparts in their assigned cycle deployment window.

Along with their federal reserve obligations, as state military units the elements of the South Carolina ANG are subject to being activated by order of the governor to provide protection of life and property, and preserve peace, order and public safety. State missions include disaster relief in times of earthquakes, hurricanes, floods and forest fires, search and rescue, protection of vital public services, and support to civil defense.

== Formations ==
Air National Guard Element, JFHQ-SC

- 169th Fighter Wing...McEntire JNGB
  - 169th Operations Group
    - 157th Fighter Squadron
    - 316th Fighter Squadron (Active associate)
    - 245th Air Traffic Control Squadron
      - 169th Operations Support Flight
  - 169th Maintenance Group
    - 169th Aircraft Maintenance Squadron
    - 169th Maintenance Squadron
      - 169th Maintenance Operations Flight
  - 169th Medical Group
  - 169th Mission Support Group
    - 169th Civil Engineer Squadron
    - 169th Logistics Readiness Squadron
    - 169th Security Forces Squadron
    - 169th Communications Flight
    - 169th Force Support Squadron

Originally established on 9 December 1946 (as the 157th Fighter Squadron); currently operates: Block 52 F-16C/D Fighting Falcon (F-16CJ/DJ).

Stationed at: McEntire Joint National Guard Base, Eastover; Operationally Gained by: Air Combat Command )ACC)

The federal mission of the 169 FW in accordance with Title 10 USC is to maintain wartime readiness and the ability to mobilize and deploy expeditiously to carry out tactical air missions or combat support activities in the event of a war or military emergency. More specifically, the wing specializes in the Suppression of Enemy Air Defenses (SEAD).

Support Unit Functions and Capabilities:

- 245th Air Traffic Control Squadron, McIntire JNGB

The 245th ATCS has the ability to perform air traffic control at fixed air bases and at remote sites.

== History ==
On 24 May 1946, the United States Army Air Forces, in response to dramatic postwar military budget cuts imposed by President Harry S. Truman, allocated inactive unit designations to the National Guard Bureau for the formation of an Air Force National Guard. These unit designations were allotted and transferred to various State National Guard bureaus to provide them unit designations to re-establish them as Air National Guard units.

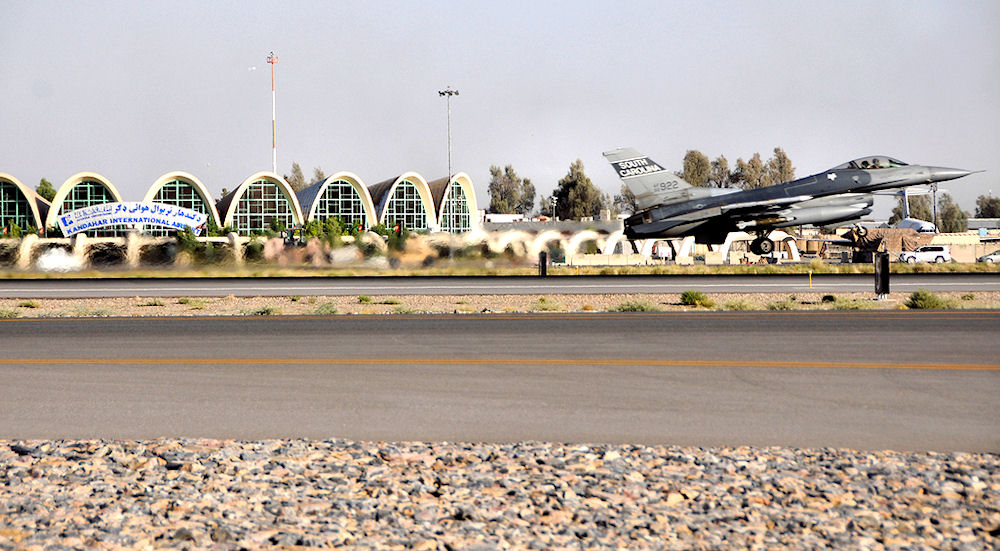
An F-16C Block 52P Fighting Falcon with the 157th Expeditionary Fighter Squadron takes off at Kandahar Airfield for a day-time mission over Afghanistan on 1 July 2012. South Carolina Air National Guard pilots and support personnel flew missions for the air tasking order and provide close air support for ground troops in Afghanistan.

The South Carolina Air National Guard origins date to 9 December 1946 with the establishment of the 157th Fighter Squadron and is oldest unit of the South Carolina Air National Guard. It was federally recognized and activated at Congaree Air Base, the present day McEntire JNGB, near Eastover and was equipped with P-51D Mustangs excess to USAAF needs. Its mission was the air defense of the state. 18 September 1947, however, is considered the South Carolina Air National Guard's official birth, concurrent with the establishment of the United States Air Force as a separate branch of the United States military under the National Security Act.

In 1952, the 157th was re-equipped with F-51H Mustangs that had been used in the United States in a training role. The squadron then became part of Tactical Air Command (TAC) as a Tactical Reconnaissance Squadron. The 157th Fighter Squadron was federalized due to the Korean War on 10 October 1950. During its federalization period, the 157th was deployed to Toul-Rosières Air Base, departing for Europe in January 1952. On 9 July 1952, the activated South Carolina Air National Guard was released from active duty and returned to state control.

On 5 September 1957, the 157th Fighter-Bomber Squadron was authorized to expand to a group level, and the 169th Fighter-Interceptor Group was established by the National Guard Bureau. The 157th was re-designated as a Fighter-Interceptor Squadron and became the group's flying squadron. In late 1961, the SCANG was again called to active duty during the Berlin Crisis, and the 169th Tactical Fighter Group was stationed at Moron Air Base, Spain.

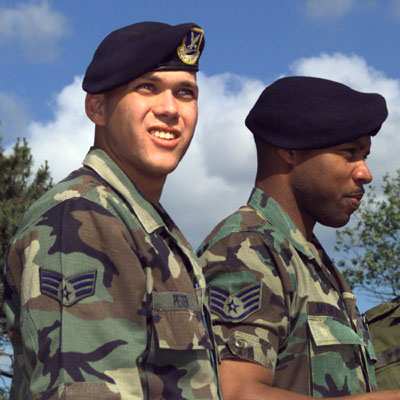
Members of the 169th Security Forces Squadron at McEntire Joint National Guard Base

Today, the South Carolina Air National Guard is one of the most advanced and modern Air National Guard organizations in the nation. The 169 FW was the first wing in the Air National Guard to fly the F-16, with the 169 FW flying the F-16A and F-16B from 1983 to 1994. In 1994, the wing transitioned to the F-16C and F-16D/Block 52, the newest, most advanced F-16 in the Air Force inventory. Prior to operating the F-16, the 169 FW operated the A-7D Corsair II during the 1970s and early 1980s and the F-104 Starfighter in the 1960s.

In late 1990, units of the SCANG were activated and deployed to Saudi Arabia for Operation Desert Shield/Storm, flying 2,000 combat missions and dropping 4 million pounds of munitions, while maintaining the highest aircraft mission capable rate in the theater. This was a significant achievement because munitions were not allowed to be deployed unless enemy targets were verified. In January 2002, aircraft and personnel of the 169th Fighter Wing were deployed to Southwest Asia in support of Operation Enduring Freedom, directly participating in combat operations. In late February 2002, the 240th Combat Communications Squadron deployed a 50-member team to Central Asia in support of war on terrorism. The 240th members returned in August after six months in theater. In September 2002, the 245 ATCS deployed to Afghanistan Asia in support of Operation Enduring Freedom, returning in January 2003. In February 2003, nearly 400 members of the 169 FW and all of its F-16s were mobilized and deployed to Southwest Asia as part of what became Operation Iraqi Freedom. The 169th was attached to the 379th Air Expeditionary Wing, stationed at Al Udeid Air Base in Qatar. The unit flew more than 400 combat missions, performing the Suppression of Enemy Air Defenses (SEAD) mission and flying numerous precision bombing missions over Iraq.

Prior to 11 Sep 2001, the 169 FW was also a regular participant in the rotational Air Expeditionary Forces (AEFs) which patrolled the Iraqi no-fly zones. The unit has deployed for: Operation Southern Watch (Qatar, 1996), Operation Northern Watch (Turkey, 2000), Operation Southern Watch (Saudi Arabia, 2001). The 169 FW was the first Air National Guard unit to deploy alongside active-duty Air Force units to comprise an AEF.

== See also ==
- South Carolina State Guard
- South Carolina Wing Civil Air Patrol
