= McEntire Joint National Guard Base =

Military airport in Richland County, SC, US

- Near Eastover, South Carolina in the United States
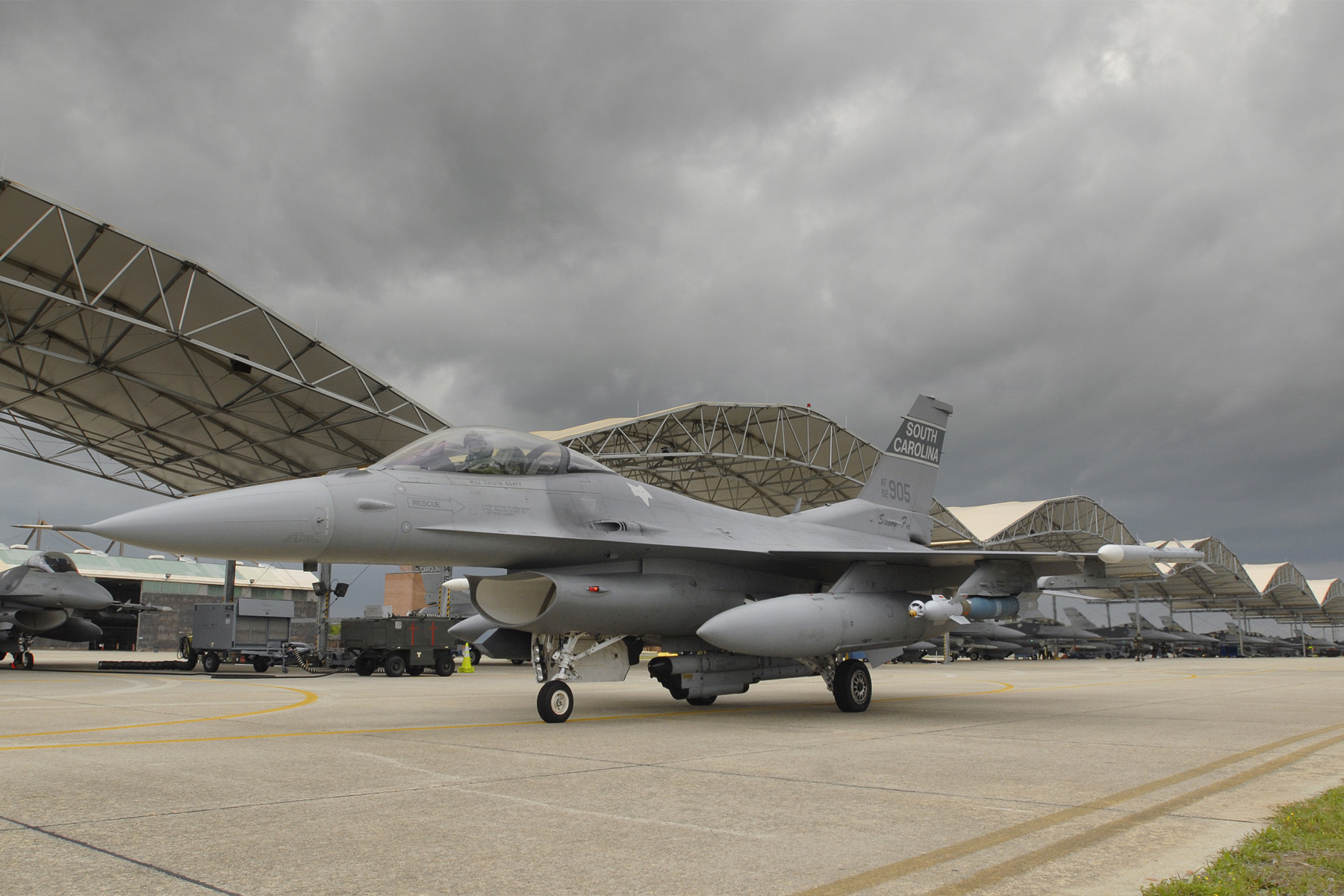
- An F-16 Fighting Falcon of the South Carolina Air National Guard's 169th Fighter Wing taxiing past aircraft shelters at McEntire JNGB

Site information
- Type: Joint Air Force and Army National Guard Base
- Owner: Department of Defense
- Operator: US Air Force (USAF)
- Controlled by: South Carolina Air National Guard
- Condition: Operational
- Website: www.169fw.ang.af.mil

Location
- Location in the United States
- Coordinates: 33°55′15″N 080°48′04″W

Site history
- Built: 1943 (as Congree Army Airfield)
- In use: 1943 – present

Garrison information
- Garrison: 169th Fighter Wing

Airfield information
- Identifiers: IATA: MMT, ICAO: KMMT, FAA LID: MMT, WMO: 723105
- Elevation: 77.4 metres (254 ft) AMSL
Runways
Direction	Length and surface
14/32	2,746.1 metres (9,010 ft) porous European mix
18/36	1,371.6 metres (4,500 ft) concrete
Helipads
Number	Length and surface
5H/23H	618.7 metres (2,030 ft) asphalt

C-130 taking off from McEntire

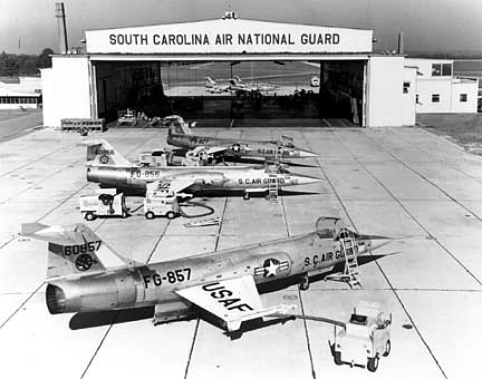
F-104As on the ramp at McEntire

McEntire Joint National Guard Base or McEntire JNGB (IATA: MMT, ICAO: KMMT, FAA LID: MMT) is a military airport located in Richland County, South Carolina, United States, 10 miles (16 km) west of the town of Eastover and approximately 15 miles southeast of the city of Columbia. It is owned by the U.S. Air Force affiliated with the South Carolina Air National Guard (SCANG).

The base is named for the late Brigadier General Barnie B. McEntire Jr., the first commander of the SCANG and its first general officer. McEntire died on 25 May 1961 when he rode his malfunctioning F-104 Starfighter into the Susquehanna River to avoid crashing in the populated area of Harrisburg, Pennsylvania.

The South Carolina Air National Guard was formed in December 1946. Today 1,250 members train at McEntire JNGB. About 900 of those are traditional Guard men and women. About 300 are full-time federal employees (technicians). About 50 are state employees (some are also traditional Guard members). The 169th Fighter Wing is the primary unit of the SCANG.

== Units ==
The host wing for the installation is the 169th Fighter Wing, which, as an Air National Guard organization, is operationally gained by the Air Combat Command (ACC)

169th Fighter Wing contains:

- 169th Operations Group
  - 169th Operations Support Flight
  - 157th Fighter Squadron "Swamp Foxes"
    - 316th Fighter Squadron (Active associate)
  - 245th Air Traffic Control Squadron
- 169th Maintenance Group
  - 169th Maintenance Squadron
  - 169th Aircraft Maintenance Squadron
  - 169th Maintenance Operations Flight
- 169th Medical Group
- 169th Mission Support Group
  - 169th Force Support Squadron
  - 169th Communications Flight
  - 169th Security Forces Squadron
  - 169th Civil Engineer Squadron
  - 169th Logistics Readiness Squadron

== History ==
The United States Army began construction on an airfield on land north of Congaree to be an outlying base to the Columbia Army Airbase. The original designation of the airfield was Congaree Army Airport, then Fort Jackson Airdrome, and finally Congaree Army Airfield. Construction was completed on January 31, 1943, with the completion of three 4,500 ft runways.

Congaree AAF was assigned to Third Air Force III Air Support Command. From January 1943 until May 1944 the airfield hosted various Army dive bombing training units. The 404th Bombardment Group (Dive) arrived at Congaree on 5 July 1943, departing on 4 September. The 406th Bombardment Group (Dive) replaced it, arriving on 18 September 1943 and remaining until being deployed to Ninth Air Force in England on 18 March 1944. On 31 March 1944, Congree was removed from the jurisdiction of Columbia AAB, and on 30 April Congaree AAF was transferred to the United States Navy.

The first Marines arrived in May 1944 to a deserted base. During May, Marine Aircraft Group 52 (MAG-52) arrived with four F4U Corsair squadrons. The field was officially commissioned as Marine Corps Auxiliary Airfield Congaree on July 10, 1944. The base fell under the command of Marine Corps Air Station Cherry Point. In October of that year MAG-52's mission was changed to that of training replacement pilots, was redesignated Marine Aircraft Group 92 and moved to Marine Corps Air Field Walnut Ridge, Arkansas. One of the fields major problems was a lack of bombing and gunnery ranges, which meant regular deployments to Marine Corps Air Station Parris Island for training.

In September 1945, after World War II, the only remaining Marine units were VMF-523 and Air Warning Squadron 14. By November 1945, all Marine aviation units had moved to MCAS Cherry Point, North Carolina.

The base was eventually turned over to the South Carolina Air National Guard and renamed McEntire ANG Base in October 1961 by Governor Ernest F. Hollings. It was renamed McEntire Joint National Guard Station in 2005 to reflect the joint presence of Army and Air National Guard units.

== South Carolina Air National Guard ==
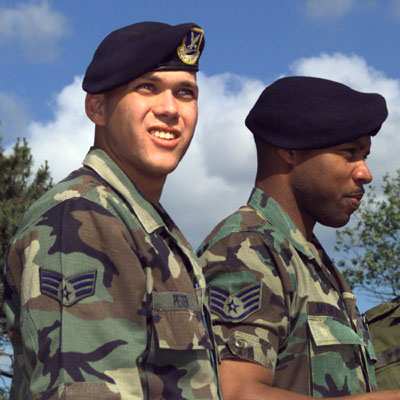
Members of the SCANG at McEntire

The mission of the 169th Fighter Wing (169 FW) is to maintain wartime readiness and the ability to mobilize and deploy expeditiously to carry out tactical air missions or combat support activities in the event of a war or military emergency. The SCANG operates as part of the Total Force of the U.S. military and is fully integrated with the active duty Air Force as a gained unit of the Air Combat Command (ACC) to perform its military mission. The South Carolina Air National Guard also has a state mission, to respond to the call of the governor in the event of natural disaster or domestic disturbance.

The 169 FW flies the F-16 Fighting Falcon, a single-seat multi-purpose fighter with the capability to fly at up to twice the speed of sound. The 169 FW was the first wing in the Air National Guard to fly the F-16. The 169 FW flew the F-16A from 1983 to 1994.

In 1994, the wing transitioned to the F-16C/Block 52, the newest, most advanced F-16 in the Air Force inventory. The 169 FW also flew a single WC-130H Hercules with weather reconnaissance equipment removed. This aircraft provided airlift support to the 169 FW, the SCANG and the SCARNG. Prior to operating the F-16, the 169 FW operated the A-7 Corsair II during the 1970s and early 1980s, the F-102 Delta Dagger in the 1960s and 1970s, and F-104 Starfighter in the 1960s. In the 1950s, a succession of P-51 Mustangs, F-80 Shooting Stars and F-86 Sabre aircraft operated from the then-Congaree ANGB.

Also located at McEntire is the 245th Air Traffic Control Squadron (245 ATCS). The 245 ATCS has the ability to perform air traffic control at fixed air bases and at remote sites.

== South Carolina Army National Guard ==
The 59th Aviation Troop Command of the South Carolina Army National Guard (SCARNG) is also located at McEntire JNGB. Assigned Army National Guard aviation units and aircraft include Company A, 1st Battalion, 111th Aviation Regiment (A/1-111 AVN GSAB (Lift)) and Det. 2, F Co/1-171 (Medevac) flying the UH-60M Blackhawk, as well as 1st Battalion, 151st Aviation Regiment (1-151 ARB) flying the AH-64A Apache.

== See also ==
- List of airports in South Carolina
- List of United States Marine Corps installations
- South Carolina World War II Army Airfields
