= South Carolina Wing Civil Air Patrol =

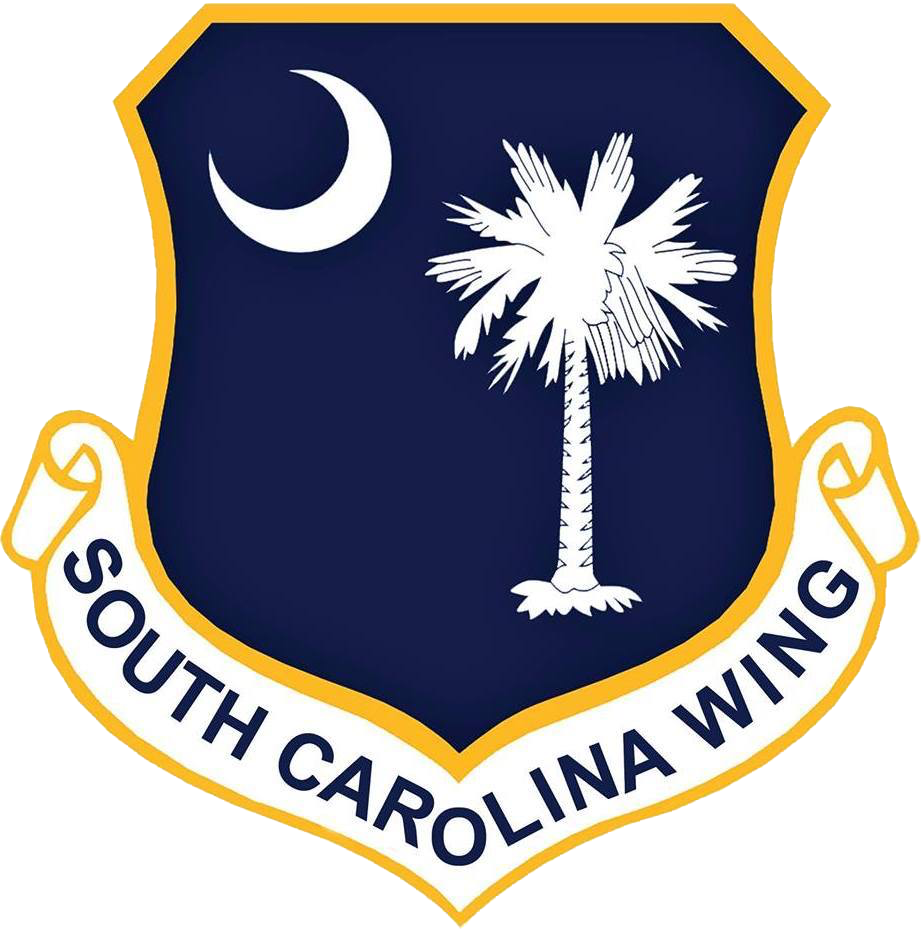
- South Carolina Wing of Civil Air Patrol

Associated branches
- United States Air Force

Command staff
- Commander: Col James Brogan
- Deputy Commander: Lt Col Rachael J. Mercer
- Chief of Staff: Capt Timothy Elson
- Senior Enlisted Leader: CMSgt Steve Fox

Current statistics
- Cadets: 543
- Seniors: 565
- Total Membership: 1108
- Website: scwg.cap.gov
- Statistics as of 2026

The South Carolina Wing of the Civil Air Patrol (CAP) is the highest echelon of Civil Air Patrol in the state of South Carolina and is part of the Mid-Atlantic Region of CAP. South Carolina Wing headquarters are located in West Columbia, South Carolina. The South Carolina Wing consists of over 750 cadet and adult members at over 17 locations across the state of South Carolina.

== Mission ==
The Civil Air Patrol has three primary missions: providing emergency services; offering cadet programs for youth; and providing aerospace education for CAP members and the general public.

=== Emergency services ===
The Civil Air Patrol performs a variety of emergency services and operational missions. These missions include: search and rescue missions directed by the Air Force Rescue Coordination Center at Tyndall Air Force Base; disaster relief, including air and ground transportation and an extensive communications network; and humanitarian services, including transporting time-sensitive medical materials including blood and human tissue, generally on behalf of the Red Cross when conventional methods of transport are unavailable. The Civil Air Patrol also provides Air Force support through the conducting of light transport, communications support, and low-altitude route surveys. In addition, CAP offers support to counter-drug operations.

=== Cadet programs ===
The Civil Air Patrol offers a cadet program for youth aged 12 to 21, which covers topics such as aerospace education, leadership training, physical fitness and moral leadership.

=== Aerospace education ===
The Civil Air Patrol offers aerospace education for Civil Air Patrol members and the public, including providing training to the members of Civil Air Patrol, primarily through the cadet program, and through offering workshops for youth at schools and public aviation events.

== Organization ==
South Carolina Wing CAP cadets during encampment at Shaw Air Force Base.

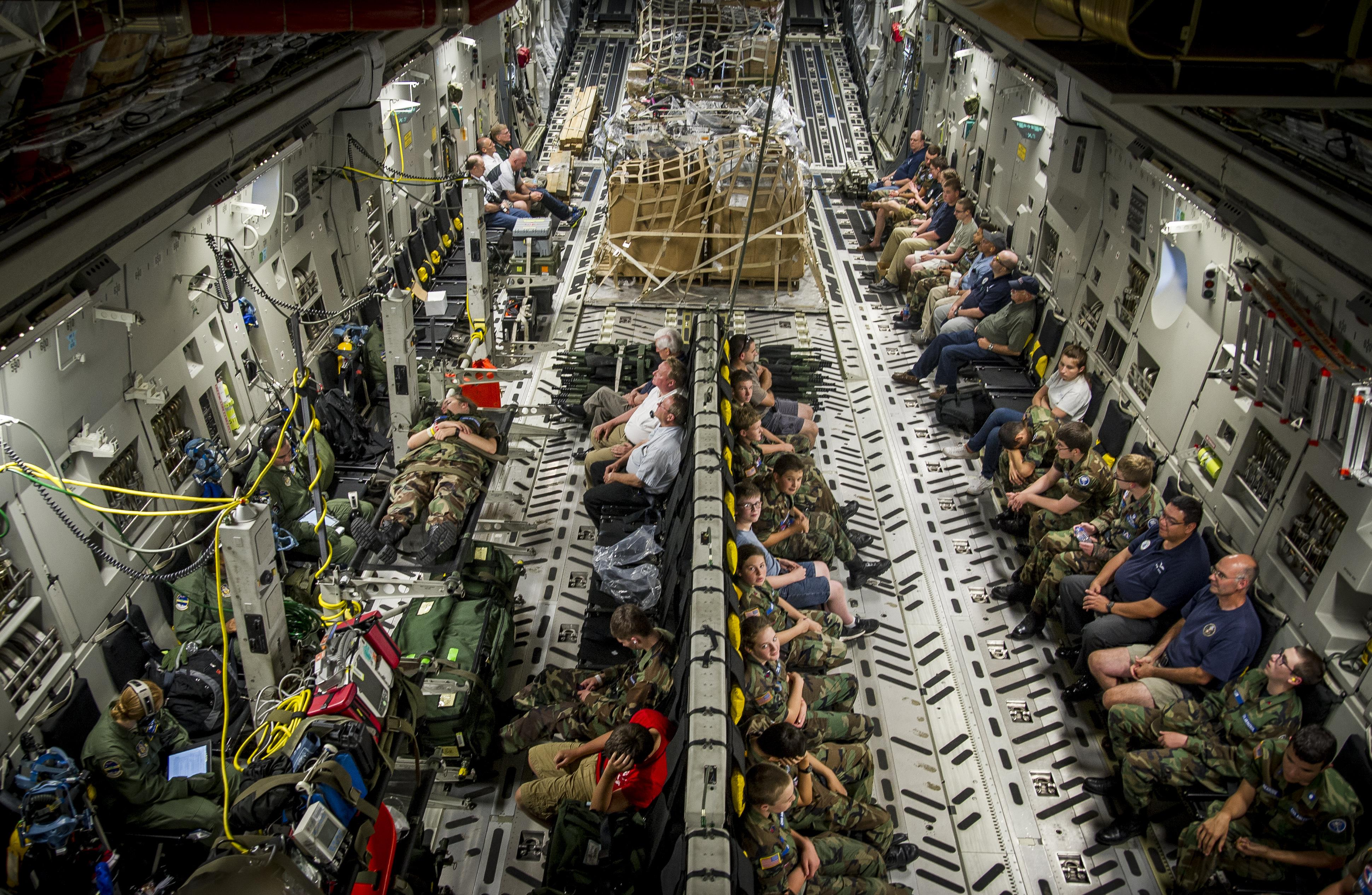
Members of the 315th Aeromedical Evacuation Squadron and the Civil Patrol's South Carolina Wing return from a response exercise.

Squadrons of the South Carolina Wing
Designation	Squadron Name	Location
MAR-SC-001	South Carolina Wing Headquarters	West Columbia
MAR-SC-005	Aiken Composite Squadron	Aiken
MAR-SC-014	Greenville Composite Squadron	Greenville
MAR-SC-020	Florence Composite Squadron	Florence
MAR-SC-032	Lexington Composite Squadron	West Columbia
MAR-SC-056	Coastal Charleston Composite Squadron	Joint Base Lindsey Graham
MAR-SC-060	East Cooper Senior Squadron	Mount Pleasant
MAR-SC-074	Charles Duke Jr. Composite Squadron	Anderson
MAR-SC-075	Sumter Composite Squadron	Sumter
MAR-SC-083	Kershaw Composite Squadron	Camden
MAR-SC-090	Spartanburg Composite Squadron	Spartanburg
MAR-SC-092	York County Composite Squadron	Fort Mill
MAR-SC-096	Hilton Head Composite Squadron	Hilton Head
MAR-SC-099	Columbia Composite Squadron	Columbia
MAR-SC-106	Emerald City Composite Squadron	Greenwood
MAR-SC-113	ACE Basin Composite Squadron	Cottageville
MAR-SC-114	Grand Strand Composite Squadron	Myrtle Beach
MAR-SC-115	Beaufort Senior Squadron	Beaufort
MAR-SC-810	Faith Christian School Cadet Squadron	Summerville
MAR-SC-999	South Carolina Legislative Squadron	West Columbia

== See also ==
- Awards and decorations of the Civil Air Patrol
- South Carolina Air National Guard
- South Carolina State Guard
