= Diron Reynolds =

American football coach (born 1971)

Arizona State Sun Devils
- Title: Defensive line coach

Personal information
- Born: February 23, 1971 (age 55); Aiken, South Carolina, U.S.

Career information
- High school: Aiken (SC)
- College: Wake Forest

Career history
- Brookland-Cayce HS (1995–1996) Assistant coach; Wake Forest (1997–1998) Graduate assistant; Wake Forest (1999–2000) Outside linebackers coach; Indiana (2001) Defensive tackles coach; Indianapolis Colts (2002–2006) Defensive quality control coach; Miami Dolphins (2007) Defensive line coach; Minnesota Vikings (2009–2013) Assistant defensive line coach; Stanford (2014) Defensive assistant; Oklahoma (2015) Defensive line coach; Stanford (2016–2022) Defensive line coach; Michigan State (2023) Defensive line coach; Arizona State (2024–present) Defensive line coach

Awards and highlights
- Super Bowl champion (XLI)

Diron Reynolds (born February 23, 1971) is an American football coach who is currently the defensive line coach at Arizona State. He has also coached at Michigan State, Stanford, Oklahoma, Wake Forest, and Indiana as well as the professional level with the Indianapolis Colts, Miami Dolphins, and Minnesota Vikings of the National Football League (NFL).

== Coaching career ==
After finishing a playing career as a linebacker at Wake Forest, Reynolds began his coaching career at Brookland-Cayce High School in South Carolina as an assistant coach as well as their strength & conditioning coach. He was hired as a graduate assistant at his alma mater Wake Forest in 1997 as a graduate assistant and was promoted to outside linebackers coach in 1999.

Following Wake Forest head coach Jim Caldwell's departure, Reynolds spent 2001 at Indiana as their defensive tackles coach. He was hired as a defensive quality control coach for the Indianapolis Colts in 2002 under Tony Dungy and reunited with Caldwell, who was the Colts assistant head coach and quarterbacks coach. While with the Colts, he was credited by Dungy with developing Dwight Freeney into a 7× Pro Bowler and a 3× first-team All-Pro. He won his first Super Bowl in his final season in Indianapolis as the Colts defeated the Bears in Super Bowl XLI. He was hired to coach the defensive line for the Miami Dolphins in 2007, and was fired after one season after the Dolphins finished the season 1–15. He was later hired as the assistant defensive line coach for the Minnesota Vikings in 2009, and later as a defensive assistant at Stanford in 2014 working with the defensive line.

=== Oklahoma ===
Reynolds was hired at Oklahoma in 2015 as the program's defensive line coach.

=== Stanford (second stint) ===
Reynolds was named the defensive line coach at Stanford in 2016.

=== Michigan State ===
It was announced on January 25, 2023, that Reynolds had been hired to be Michigan State's new defensive line coach.

=== Arizona State ===
On December 3, 2023, Reynolds was named the new defensive line coach at Arizona State.
