= 157th Fighter Squadron =

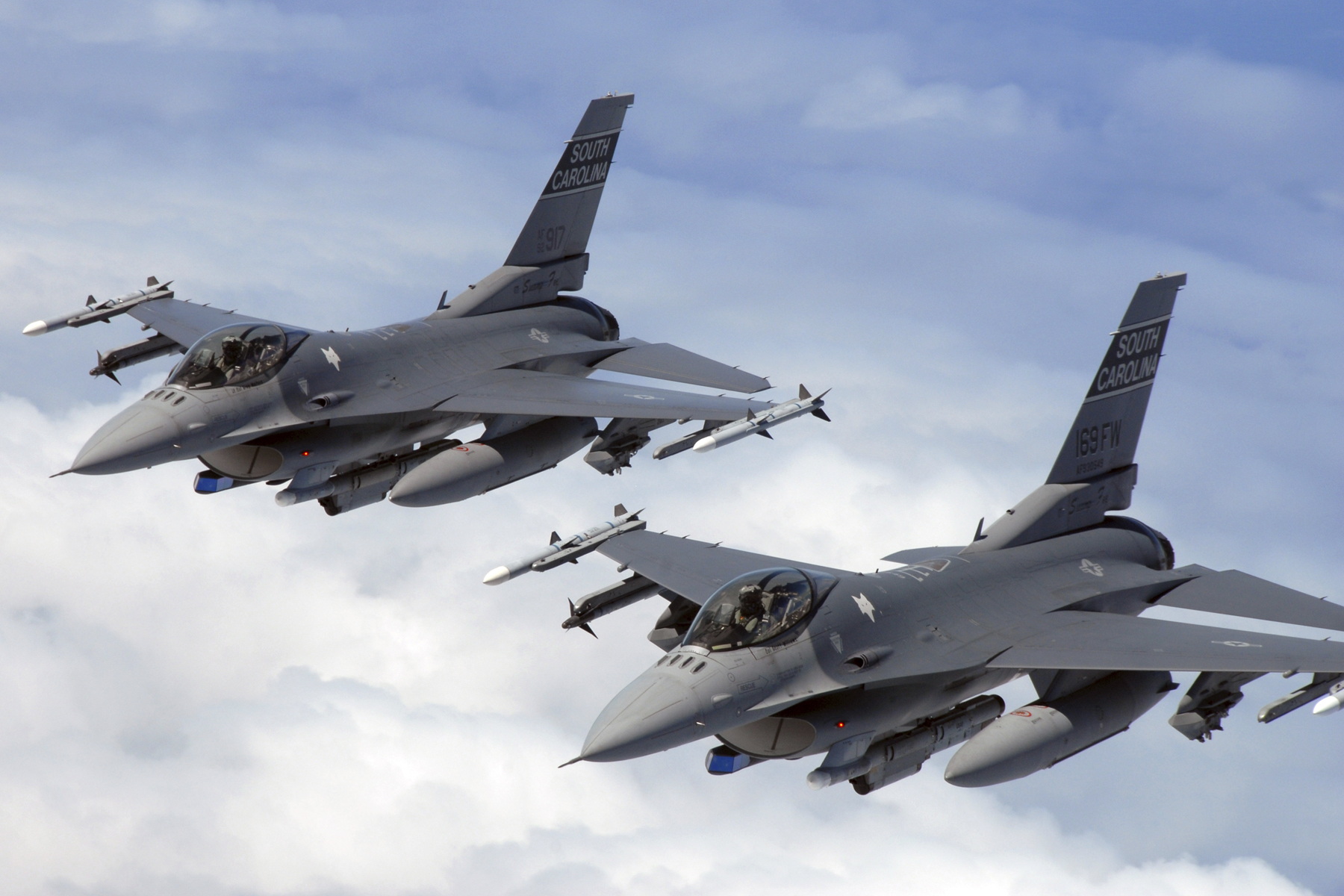
- 169th Fighter Wing Swamp Foxes in the air (Note: Demon flight of F-16 pilots from the 157th Fighter Squadron flies a training mission in the Kiwi Military Operations Area airspace over the coast of North Carolina.)
- Active: 1942–1945; 1946–1952; 1952–present
- Country: United States
- Allegiance: South Carolina
- Branch: Air National Guard
- Type: Squadron
- Role: Fighter
- Part of: South Carolina Air National Guard
- Garrison/HQ: McEntire Joint National Guard Base, South Carolina
- Nickname: Swamp Fox
- Engagements: European Theater of Operations; Operation Desert Storm; Operation Enduring Freedom; Operation Iraqi Freedom; 2026 Iran war
- Decorations: Distinguished Unit Citation

Insignia
- 157th Fighter Squadron emblem

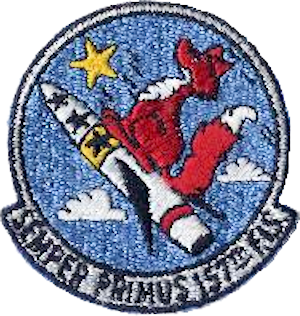
- Patch with 157th Fighter-Interceptor Squadron emblem

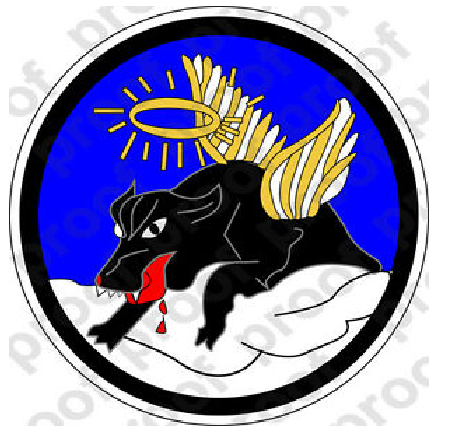
- 350th Fighter Squadron emblem

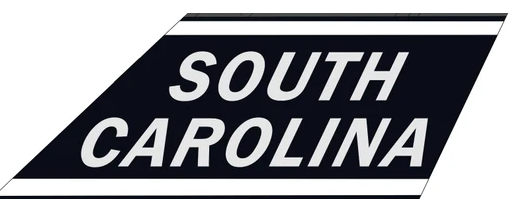
- Tail stripe

The 157th Fighter Squadron is a unit of the South Carolina Air National Guard 169th Fighter Wing located at McEntire Joint National Guard Base, South Carolina. The 157th is one of the few Air National Guard squadrons to operate the HARM Targeting System (HTS)-equipped F-16C Block 52 Fighting Falcon, also known as the F-16CJ.

== History ==
=== World War II ===
Activated in late 1942. Trained under First Air Force in northeastern United States with P-40 Warhawks, also performing air defense as part of Norfolk and Philadelphia Fighter Wings. Deployed to European Theater of Operations, June 1943, being equipped with P-47 Thunderbolts in England. Assigned as a heavy bomber escort squadron under VIII Fighter Command. Re-equipped with long-range P-51D Mustangs, July 1944, Thunderbolts being transferred to IX Fighter Command as fighter-bombers supporting ground forces in France. Performed bomber escort missions until the end of the war in Europe, April 1945. Squadron demobilized in England during the summer of 1945, inactivated in United States as a paper unit, October 1945.

=== South Carolina Air National Guard ===
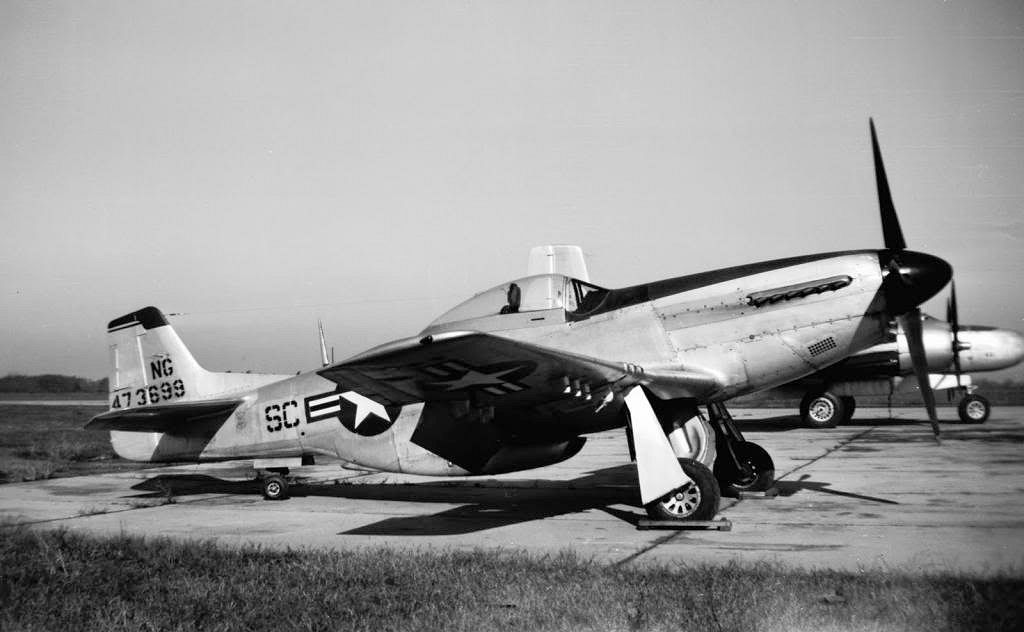
Squaron P-51 Mustang in 1946 (Note: Aircraft is North American P-51D Mustang, serial 44-73699. Note the "NG" on the tail, indicating the photo was taken before the Air National Guard was established.)

The 350th Fighter Squadron was redesignated the 157th Fighter Squadron, and allotted to the National Guard on 24 May 1946. It was organized at Congaree Air Base, South Carolina and extended federal recognition on 9 December 1946. The 157th Fighter Squadron was assigned to the Georgia ANG 54th Fighter Wing, an umbrella organization formed for administrative and logistical support for many National Guard units in the southeastern United States. It remained, however, under the operational control of the South Carolina Air National Guard.

The 157th was equipped with F-51D Mustangs and was assigned an air defense mission for the state of South Carolina. In 1950 the 157th was re-equipped with former World War II F-5 Mustangs, now designated RF-51D which had been used in the United States in a training role. The squadron became part of Tactical Air Command as a reconnaissance squadron.

==== Korean War activation ====
The 157th Fighter Squadron was federalized due to the Korean War on 10 October 1950. On 1 November the RF-51 Mustangs were transferred to other units and the 157th was re-equipped with RF-80A Shooting Star photo-reconnaissance jets and moved to Lawson Air Force Base, Georgia. At Lawson, the 117th Tactical Reconnaissance Group was organized with the 157th along with the 160th Tactical Reconnaissance Squadron (Alabama ANG), also with RF-80As, and the 112th Tactical Reconnaissance Squadron (Ohio ANG) with RB-26C Invader night reconnaissance aircraft. The 117th Group was assigned to the newly-formed 117th Tactical Recoonnaissance Wing.

The 117th Group then began what was then believed to be a short transition training period. The original plan was to deploy the 117th to France and reinforce the United States Air Forces in Europe at a new base in France, Toul-Rosières Air Base. However Toul Air Base was still under construction, and delays in France for several reasons forced the 117th to remain at Lawson for over a year until finally deploying in January 1952.

The 117th arrived at Toul Air Base on 27 January 1952. However at the time of the wing's arrival, Toul consisted of a sea of mud, and the new jet runway was breaking up and could not support safe flying. The commander of the 117th deemed it uninhabitable and its flying squadrons of the wing were ordered dispersed to West Germany. The 112th Squadron was transferred to Wiesbaden Air Base, the 157th TRS to Fürstenfeldbruck Air Base, and the 160th to Neubiberg Air Base. The non-flying headquarters and support organizations remained at Toul.

The mission of the 117th was to provide tactical, visual, photographic and electronic reconnaissance by both day and night, as was required by the military forces within the European command. The RF-80s were responsible for the daylight operations; the RB-26s for night photography. In June 1952, the 117th was involved in Exercise June Primer. This exercise took place in an area bordered by a line drawn from Cherbourg to Geneva in the east and in the west by this Swiss, Austrian and Russian occupation zone borders.

The two RF-80 squadrons of the 117th had to complete a number of varying missions, including vertical photography of prospective paratroop air drop zones, oblique photos of the Rhine and Danube river bridges, vertical photography of the airfields of Jever, Fassburg, Celle, Sundorf and Gütersloh and various visual missions on behalf of the seventh army, including artillery adjustment for the 816th field artillery. The 157 TRS had had wire recorders fitted to five of its RF-80s prior to June Primer and these greatly facilitated the latter missions.

On 10 July 1952 the squadron was released from active duty and inactivated. its mission was taken over by the newly activated 32d Tactical Reconnaissance Squadron.

==== Air defense ====
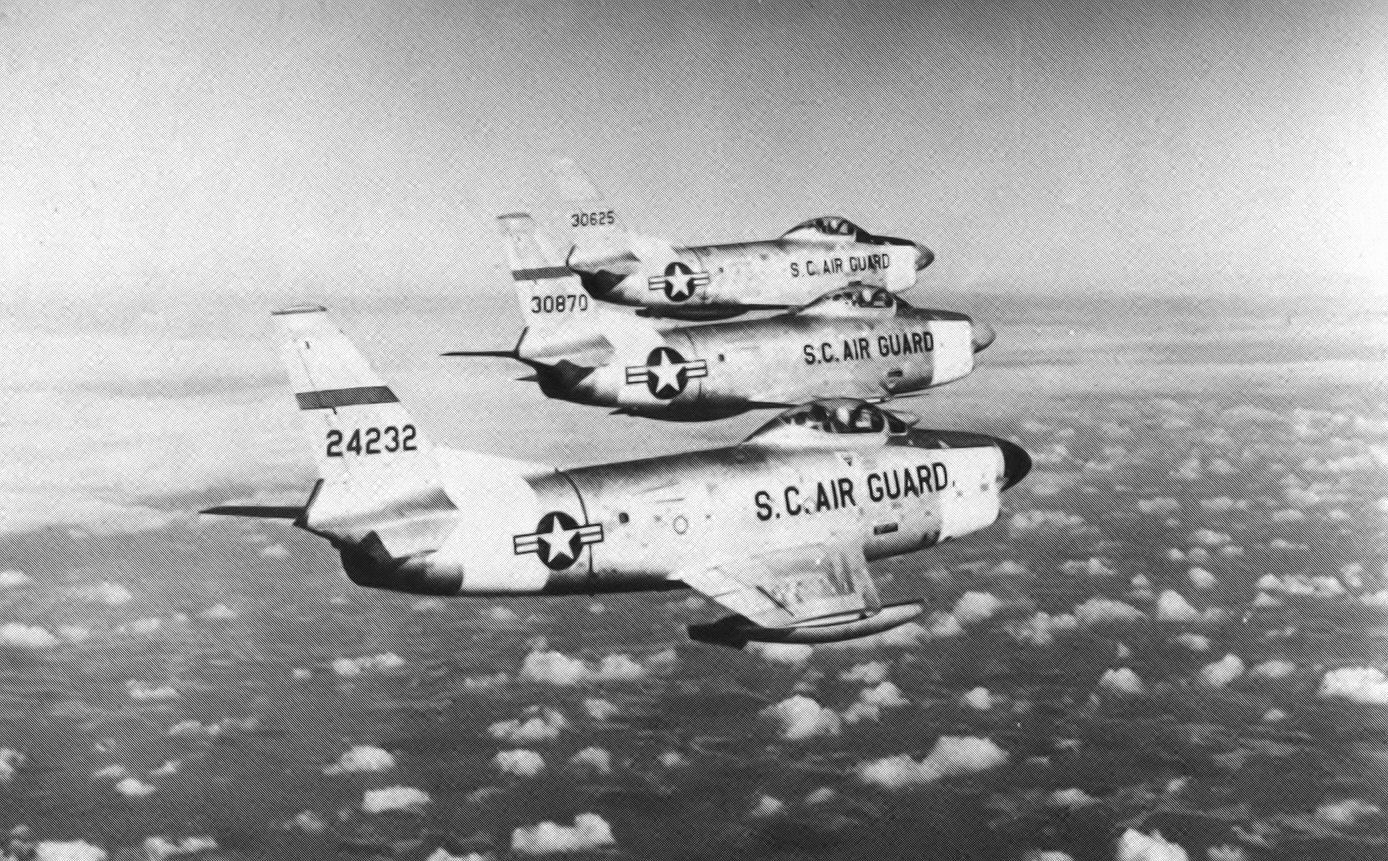
157th FIS 3-ship F-86L Sabre Interceptor aircraft formation, 1959

After returning from West Germany, the squadron was r-formed at Congaree Air Base and the South Carolina Air National Guard assumed an air defense mission. Due to the lack of jet aircraft in the United States (most were being used in the Korean War), the 157th was re-equipped with very long-range F-51H Mustangs and the unit was allocated to the Eastern Air Defense Force, Air Defense Command (ADC). After the Korean Armistice in 1953, the 157th began to receive F-86A Sabre jets, pressed into the daylight interceptor mission by ADC. In 1954, the Mustangs were reaching the end of their service life, and ADC supplied the 157th with some F-80C Shooting Stars as an interim replacement.

On 5 September 1957, the 157th Fighter-Bomber Squadron was authorized to expand to a group level, and the 169th Fighter Group was established. The 157th was redesignated as the 157th Fighter-Interceptor Squadron and became the group's flying squadron. Other elements assigned into the group were the 169th group headquarters, 169th Material Squadron (maintenance and supply), 169th Air Base Squadron, and the 169th USAF Dispensary.

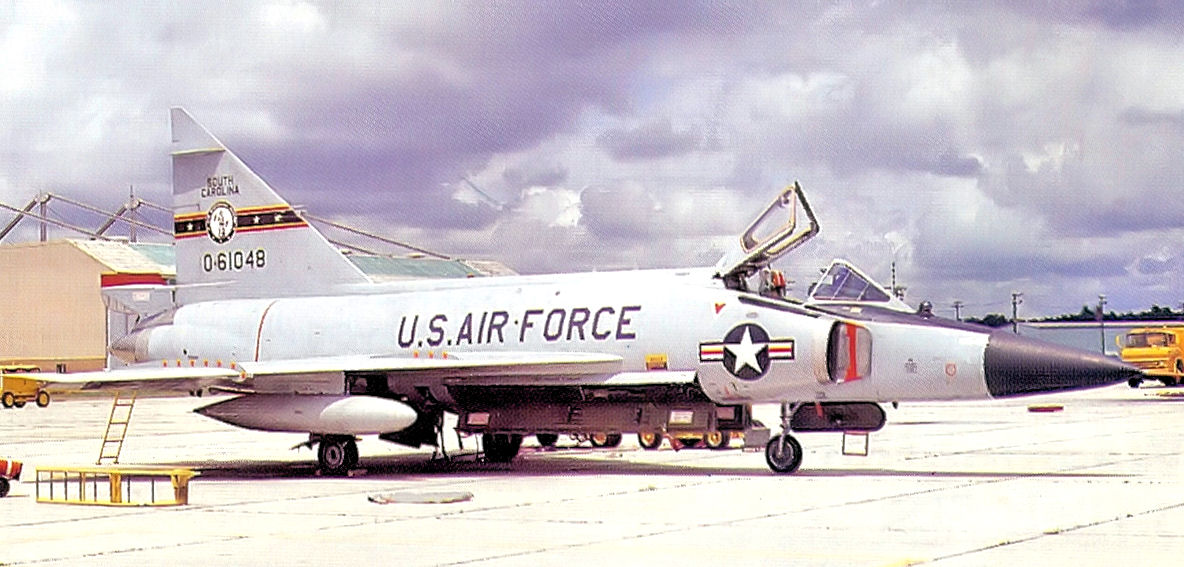
157th Fighter-Interceptor Squadron Convair F-102A Delta Dagger, AF Ser. No. 56-1048, 1973.

Shortly afterwards Air Defense Command upgraded the squadron to the all-weather/day-night F-86L Sabre Interceptor aircraft.

In 1960 ADC released all its F-104A Starfighters to the ANG because the F-104 fire control system was not sophisticated enough to make it an all-weather interceptor. The 157th was one of three selected ANG units to receive the Starfighter Mach-2 interceptors. The "Swamp Foxes", as a result of the national recognition as one of the best air defense units in the nation, were chosen to fly the new high performance jet fighter.

Brigadier General Barnie B. McEntire Jr., the first commander of the South Carolina ANG and its first general officer died 25 May 1961, when he courageously piloted his malfunctioning F-104 fighter jet away from populated areas near Harrisburg, Pennsylvania, to crash into the Susquehanna River. On 1 October 1961, then-Governor Ernest F. Hollings presided over the ceremony renaming the heroic wing commander's South Carolina installation from Congaree Air Base to McEntire Air National Guard Base.

The 157th was called into active service a second time in November 1961 as the construction of the infamous "Berlin Wall" pushed the world to the brink of war. Within a month after mobilization, 750 personnel and 22 157th FIS F-104 aircraft were in place at Morón Air Base, Spain as the unit took up flying daily air defense patrols as part of the NATO air defense force in Western Europe. With world tension easing, the squadron returned home in August 1962.

Following the Cuban Missile Crisis, ADC decided to make a permanent fighter unit at Homestead Air Force Base an F-104 unit because of its superior fighter-on-fighter performance. The F-104's lack of an all-weather capability not a factor because Cuba lacked a bomber force. In June 1963 the F-104s were transferred back to the active-duty Air Force. The South Carolina ANG was re-equipped with F-102A Delta Daggers, which became available because of Project Clearwater, which withdrew F-102s from overseas bases. The "Deuce", still a very potent interceptor, served with the 169th FIG until April 1975, when Aerospace Defense Command was reducing the USAF interceptor force as the threat of Soviet Bombers attacking the United States was deemed remote.

==== Tactical Air Command ====
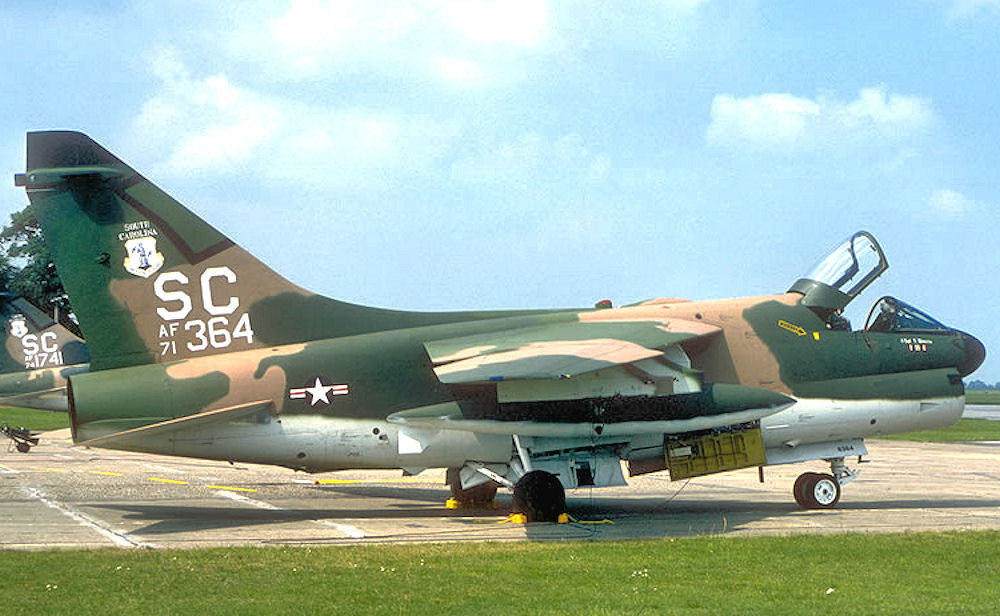
A-7D Corsair II, AF Ser. No. 71-0364, 157th Tactical Fighter Squadron, about 1976

With the phase-down of continental air defenses in the 1970s, the 169th was transferred to Tactical Air Command (TAC), and was redesignated a tactical fighter group. The 157th Tactical Fighter Squadron began to receive A-7D Corsair II subsonic tactical close air support aircraft from Tactical Air Command units that were preparing to receive the new A-10 Thunderbolt II. Receiving its aircraft from the 354th Tactical Fighter Wing at Myrtle Beach Air Force Base and the 355th Tactical Fighter Wing at Davis-Monthan Air Force Base, Arizona. The aircraft had excellent accuracy with the aid of an automatic electronic navigation and weapons delivery system. Although designed primarily as a ground attack aircraft, it also had limited air-to-air combat capability. In 1982, the 157th received new twin-seat A-7K trainers.

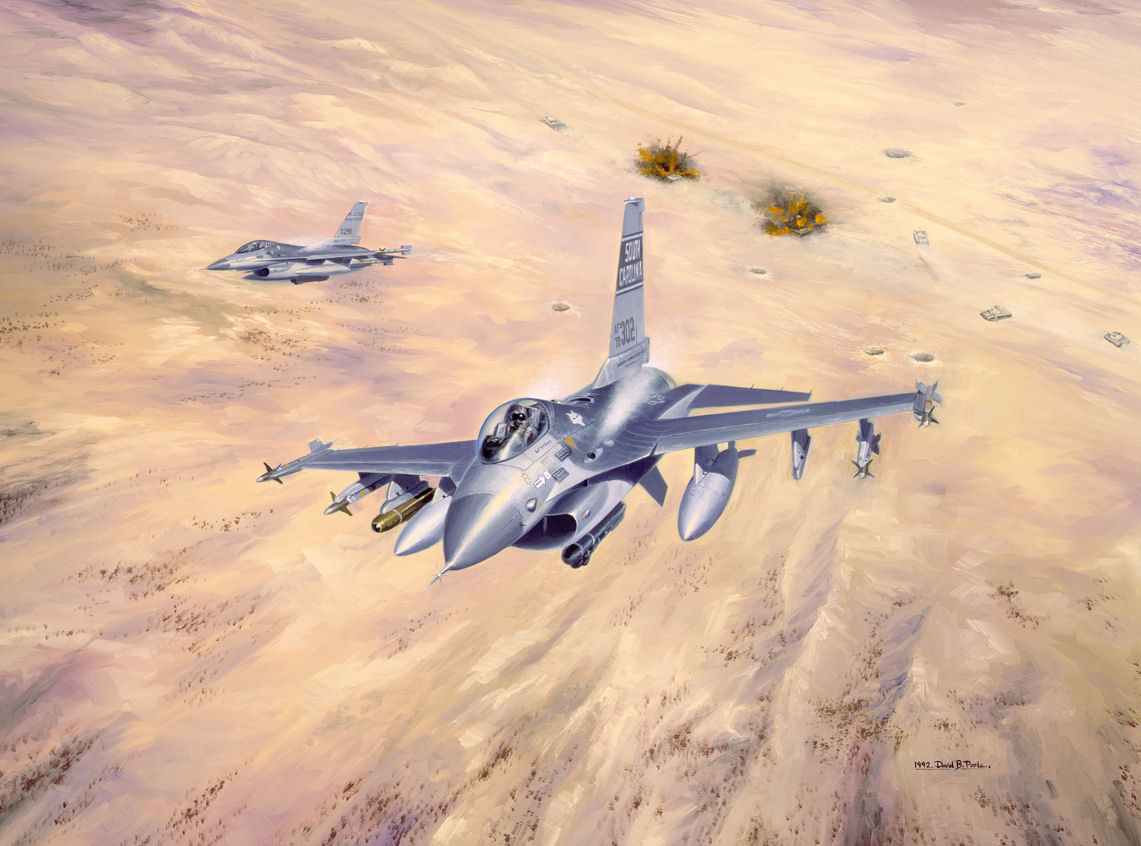
Swamp Foxes in Operation Desert Storm, Air National Guard Art, 1992

In the early 1980s, the South Carolina congressional delegation in Congress, led by Senators Strom Thurmond and Ernest Hollings, pressured the Department of Defense to upgrade Army and Air National Guard units with front line equipment to better supplement the Active Duty forces as part of the "Total Force" concept. Specifically, Thurmond and Hollings wanted the Air Force to equip the South Carolina ANG with the new F-16 Fighting Falcon, which was, as the time, just being introduced into the active duty force of Tactical Air Command. Beginning in July 1983, some of the initial Block 1 and Block 5 F-16As were transferred to the 169th Tactical Fighter Group, being the first Air National Guard unit to receive the aircraft. Its A-7Ds were subsequently reassigned to other Air National Guard units. Later, Block 10 F-16A/B were delivered by the Air Force to the 157th TFS. By the mid eighties all the F-16s received by the 169th had undergone Pacer Loft modification bringing them up to the same block 10 standard.

With the equipment change to the F-16, the 169th was assigned to the air defense mission again under Air Defense, Tactical Air Command (ADTAC), which was established when TAC assumed the Aerospace Defense Command mission in 1979. In addition, although the F-16s weren't adapted to perform in the tactical close air support mission that the A-7D was utilized for, the 157th TFS did practice the conventional attack role with Mark 82 (Mk 82) and Mark 84 (Mk 84) gliding bombs. The quality of the pilots and ammunition/maintenance crews of the 157th TFS was demonstrated during Gunsmoke '89 held at Nellis AFB from 1 October till 14 October. The 157th TFS took first place out of 15 other teams.

In December 1990, during the buildup for war during Operation Desert Shield, the 157th was federalized for a third time and was deployed to Prince Sultan Air Base, Al Kharj, Saudi Arabia just a year and a half after taking first place at Gunsmoke '89. The 157th Tactical Fighter Squadron (Provisional) flew a total of 1,729 combat sorties during Operation Desert Storm. A total mission rate of over 90% was achieved, which was quite a remarkable feat.

==== Post Cold War era ====
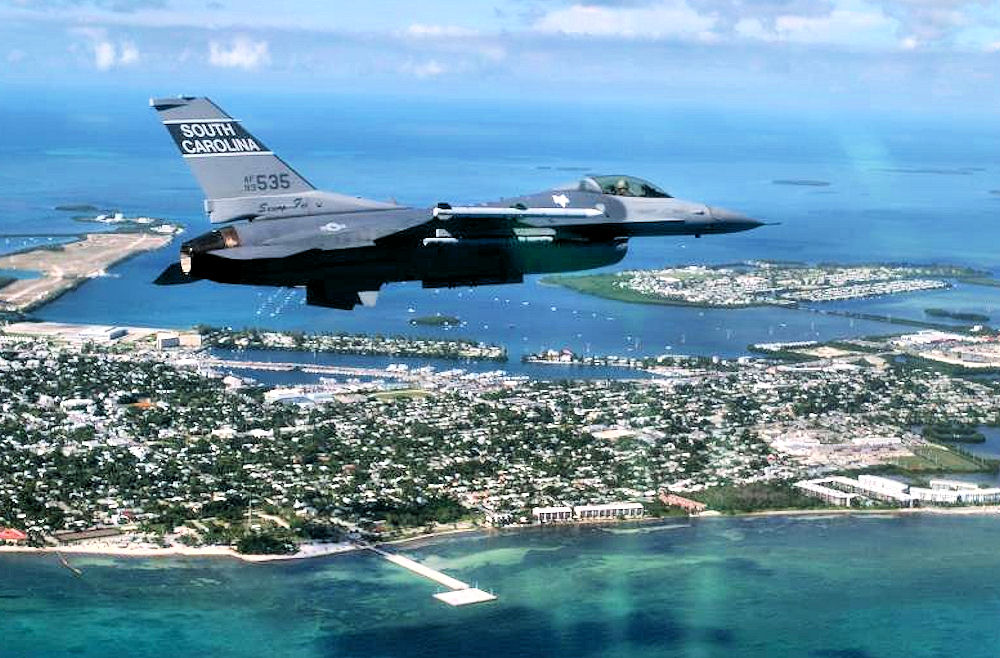
157th FS F-16CJ, AF Ser. No. 93-0535 over, Hilton Head Island, SC, about 2000

Early in the 1990s with the declared end of the Cold War and the continued decline in military budgets, the Air Force restructured to meet changes in strategic requirements, decreasing personnel, and a smaller infrastructure. The 169th adopted the new USAF "Objective Organization" in early 1992, with the word "tactical" being eliminated from its designation and becoming the 169th Fighter Group. Tactical Air Command was inactivated on 1 June, being replaced by the new Air Combat Command.

In 1995, the 157th Fighter Squadron became the recipient of brand-new Block 52 F-16C/D Fighting Falcons coming straight from the Lockheed facility at Fort Worth, Texas. The 169th Fighter Group becoming the first AirNational Guard unit to receive these state-of-the-art aircraft. The mission profile of the unit changed in the way that they became a multi-role squadron being able to perform all kind of missions. More specifically they also received the HARM Targeting System being able to fly anti-radar sorties with the AGM-88 anti-radar missile.

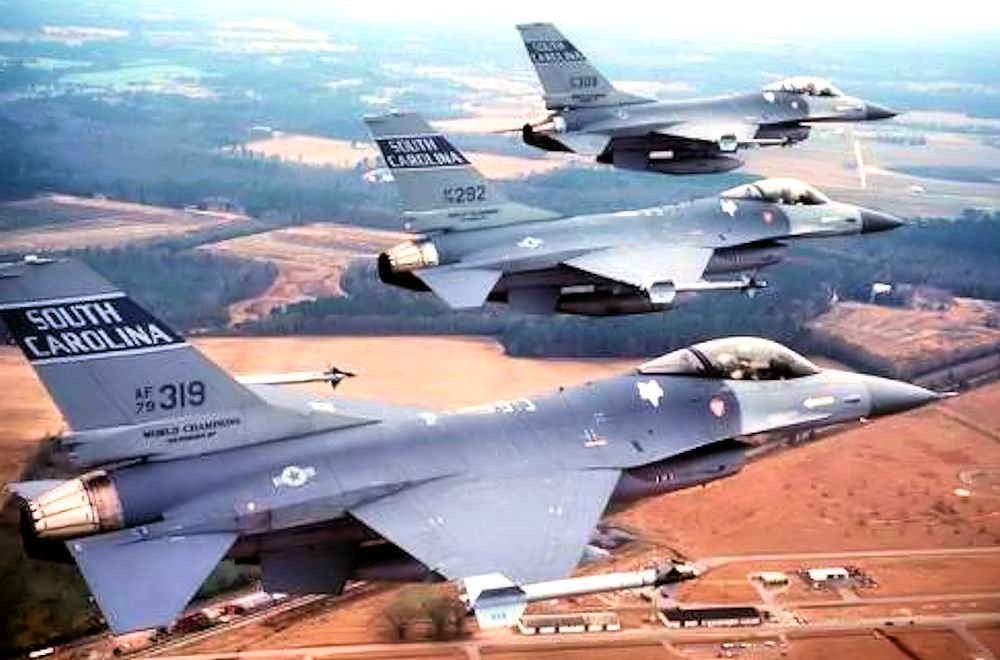
157th Tactical Fighter Squadron – 3 F-16A Formation – 1989

The main mission profile of the squadron therefore changed to that of Suppression of Enemy Air Defenses (SEAD). The 157th Fighter Squadron continues to fly the SEAD mission today. Also, on 11 October 1995 the 169th became a wing, and the 157th Fighter Squadron became part of the new 169th Operations Group under the 169th Fighter Wing.

In mid-1996, the Air Force, in response to budget cuts, and changing world situations, began experimenting with Air Expeditionary organizations. The Air Expeditionary Force concept was developed that would mix Active-Duty, Reserve and Air National Guard elements into a combined force. Instead of entire permanent units deploying as "Provisional" as in the 1991 Gulf War, Expeditionary units are composed of "aviation packages" from several wings, including active-duty Air Force, the Air Force Reserve Command and the Air National Guard, would be married together to carry out the assigned deployment rotation.

In February 1997, the 157th Expeditionary Fighter Squadron (157 EFS) was first formed from 169th FW personnel and aircraft and deployed to Doha International Airport, Qatar, to join with other active-duty and national guard squadrons as part of Operation Southern Watch. This mission was initiated mainly to cover for attacks of Iraqi forces on the Iraqi Shi’ite Muslims. This made the 169th the first Air National Guard unit to deploy alongside active-duty Air Force units to comprise an Air Expeditionary Force (AEF).

The 157th EFS was activated again in January 2000 as a component of Operation Northern Watch; a United States European Command Combined Task Force (CTF) who was responsible for enforcing the United Nations mandated no-fly zone above the 36th parallel in Iraq. This mission was a successor to Operation Provide Comfort which also entailed support for the Iraqi Kurds. The deployment was completed in April 2000. The 157th EFS was formed again in March 2001, when the unit deployed to Prince Sultan AB, Saudi Arabia in a second Operation Southern Watch deployment. The guardsmen returned to McIntire JGB in July.

==== Global war on terrorism ====
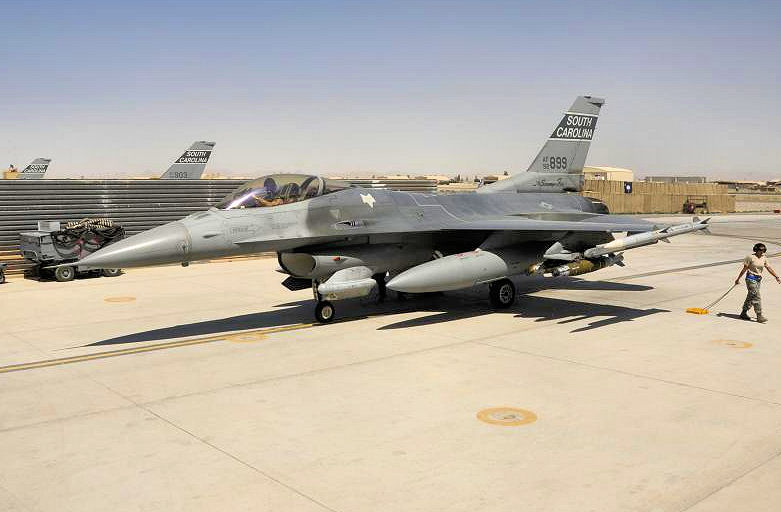
157th Expeditionary Fighter Squadron F-16C Block 52P Fighting Falcon, AF Ser. No. 92-3899, Kandahar Airfield, Afghanistan, 21 May 2012

In 2002, aircraft and personnel from the 169th deployed to Southwest Asia in support of Operation Enduring Freedom (OEF) and participated directly in combat operations. Also that year, 50 South Carolina ANG airmen, then assigned to the 240th Combat Communications Squadron, deployed to Central Asia for six months in support of the global war on terrorism, and the 245th ATCS deployed to Afghanistan in support of Operation Enduring Freedom.

In 2003, nearly 400 Airmen from the 169th and all its F-16s were mobilized and deployed to Southwest Asia as part of what became Operation Iraqi Freedom (OIF). The 169th was attached to the 379th Air Expeditionary Wing, stationed in Qatar, and flew more than 400 combat missions (performing the Suppression and Destruction of Enemy Air Defenses mission and flying numerous precision bombing missions over Iraq.

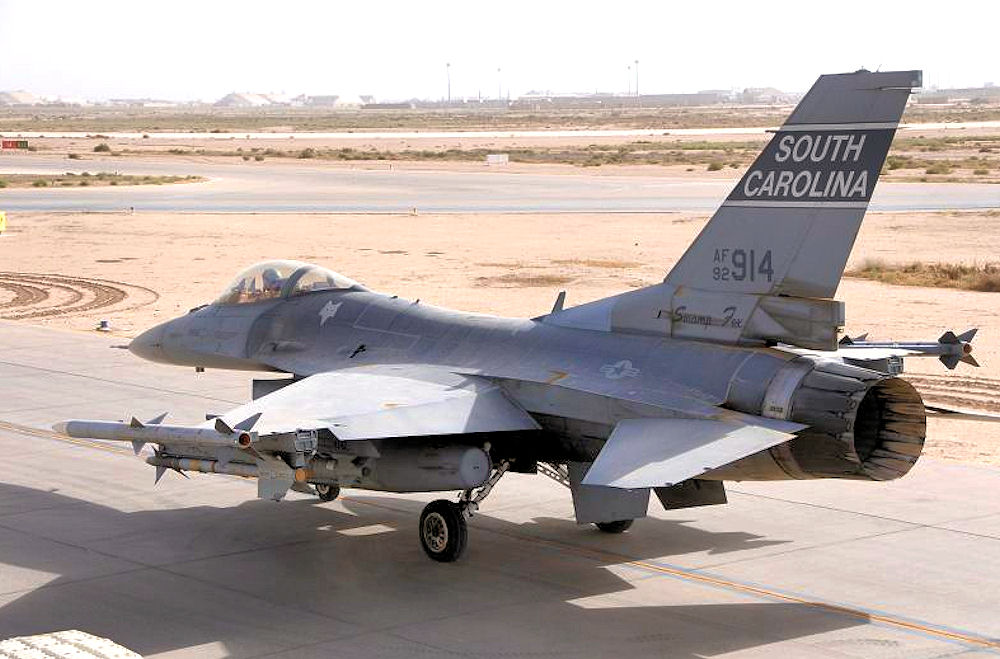
157th EFS F-16C, AF Ser. No. 92-3914, at Balad AB, Iraq, 2010

In 2005, the Base Realignment and Closure Commission announced an historic expansion at McEntire. Five more Block 52 F-16s from the active duty USAF would arrive at the base in 2006 and five more the following year. Then, in 2007, active duty Air Force personnel began arriving at McEntire as the base prepared to host and operate the largest Active Association unit in the nation's Combat Air Forces, bringing about 150 active duty personnel on board to work, train and deploy with the 169th.

In May 2010, the 169th became the first Air National Guard unit to support an AEF mission for a full 120 days. While simultaneously deploying Airmen for Operation Enduring Freedom, the wing deployed more than 300 Airmen in support of Operation Iraqi Freedom, during which the 169th flew more than 800 combat air patrol missions over Iraq from Balad AB and other locations. The unprecedented deployment also allowed the 169th team to escort the last Army combat forces out of Iraq on the last day of OEF.

Starting in October 2010 the 157th FS began an Air Sovereignty Alert mission at nearby Shaw AFB. The squadron gradually took over the alert duties of the 20th Fighter Wing and, on 6 May 2011, the squadron completely took over the role when a new alert facility was built at McEntire Joint National Guard Base.

Most recently, in April 2012, the 157th EFS was formed and deployed with pilots, maintenance specialists and support staffers. They provided air support to ground units from Kandahar Airfield, Afghanistan. Pilots flew more than 2,200 sorties for a total of 9,400 combat hours. The four-month deployment ended in late August.

Although not confirmed it has been discussed that the 157th Fighter Squadron will likely be re-equipped with the Lockheed Martin F-35A Lightning II early in its roll-out to active duty USAF units such as the 20th Fighter Wing at nearby Shaw AFB, as the South Carolina ANG has a history of receiving the newest equipment when it becomes available.

== Lineage ==
- Constituted as the 350th Fighter Squadron on 29 September 1942

Activated on 1 October 1942
Inactivated on 18 October 1945.

- Redesignated 157th Fighter Squadron, and allotted to the National Guard on 24 May 1946

Extended federal recognition on 9 December 1946
Federalized and ordered to active service on 10 October 1950
Redesignated 157th Tactical Reconnaissance Squadron on 27 October 1951
Relieved from active duty and returned to South Carolina state control on 9 July 1952
Redesignated 157th Fighter-Bomber Squadron on 10 November 1952
Redesignated 157th Fighter-Interceptor Squadron on 5 September 1957
Federalized and ordered to active service on 1 November 1961
Relieved from active duty and returned to South Carolina state control on 15 August 1962
Redesignated 157th Tactical Fighter Squadron on 1 April 1975
Federalized and ordered to active service o: 29 December 1990
Relieved from active duty and returned to South Carolina State Control on 22 July 1991
Redesignated 157th Fighter Squadron on 15 March 1992

=== Assignments ===
- 353d Fighter Group, 1 October 1942 – 18 October 1945
- 54th Fighter Wing, 9 December 1946
- 117th Tactical Reconnaissance Group, 10 October 1950
- 116th Fighter-Interceptor Group (later 116th Fighter-Bomber Group, 10 July 1952
- 169th Fighter Group 9later 169th Fighter-Interceptor Group, 169th Tactical Fighter Group, 169th Fighter Group), 5 September 1957

Elements attached to: 4th Tactical Fighter Wing (Provisional), 29 December 1990 – 22 July 1991

- 169th Operations Group, 11 October 1995 – present

=== Stations ===
- Mitchel Field, New York, 1 October 1942
- Richmond Army Air Base, Virginia, c. 7 October 1942
- Norfolk Army Airfield, Virginia, 23 October 1942
- Millville Army Airfield, New Jersey, 16 February – 27 May 1943
- RAF Goxhill (AAF-345), England, 8 June 1943
- RAF Metfield (AAF-366), England, 5 August 1943
- RAF Raydon (AAF-157), England, 14 April 1944 – 11 October 1945
- Camp Kilmer, New Jersey, 16–18 October 1945
- Congaree Air Base, South Carolina, 3 December 1946
- Lawson Air Force Base, Georgia, 1 April 1951
- Fürstenfeldbruck Air Base, West Germany, 27 January-10 July 1952
- Congaree Air Base (later McEntire Air National Guard Base), South Carolina, 10 July 1952
- Morón Air Base, Spain, 1 November 1961 –
- McEntire Air National Guard Base (later McEntire Joint National Guard Base), South Carolina, 15 August 1962 – present

==== South Carolina Air National Guard deployments ====
- 1990-1991 Gulf War federalization

Operated from: Prince Sultan Air Base, Al Kharj, Saudi Arabia, 29 December 1990 – 22 July 1991

- Operation Southern Watch

Operated from: Doha International Airport, Qatar, 26 February–March 1997

- Operation Northern Watch

Operated from: Incirlik Air Base, Turkey, January–April 2000

- Operation Southern Watch

Operated from: Prince Sultan Air Base, Saudi Arabia, March–July 2001

- Operation Enduring Freedom

Operated from: Al Udeid Air Base, Qatar, 8 January – 3 April 2002

- Operation Iraqi Freedom

Operated from: Al Udeid Air Base, Qatar, February–August 2003
Operated from: Balad Air Base, Iraq, 14 May – 27 August 2010

- Operation Enduring Freedom

Operated from: Kandahar Airfield, Afghanistan, 8 April – 27 August 2012

=== Aircraft ===
- P-40 Warhawk, 1942–1943
- P-47 Thunderbolt, 1943–1944
- P-51 Mustang, 1944–1945
- F-51D Mustang, 1946–1950
- RF-51D Mustang, 1950–1951
- RF-80A Shooting Star, 1951–1952
- F-51H Mustang, 1952–1954
- F-86A Sabre, 1953–1955
- F-80C Shooting Star, 1954–1958
- F-86L Sabre Interceptor, 1958–1960
- F-104A/B Starfighter, 1960–1963
- F-102A Delta Dagger, 1963–1975
- A-7D Corsair II, 1974–1983
- Block 10 F-16A/B Fighting Falcon, 1983–1994 (Also Some Block 1 and 5)
- Block 52 F-16C/D Fighting Falcon 1995 – present (F-16CJ)
