= Leon Lott =

American police officer (born 1953)

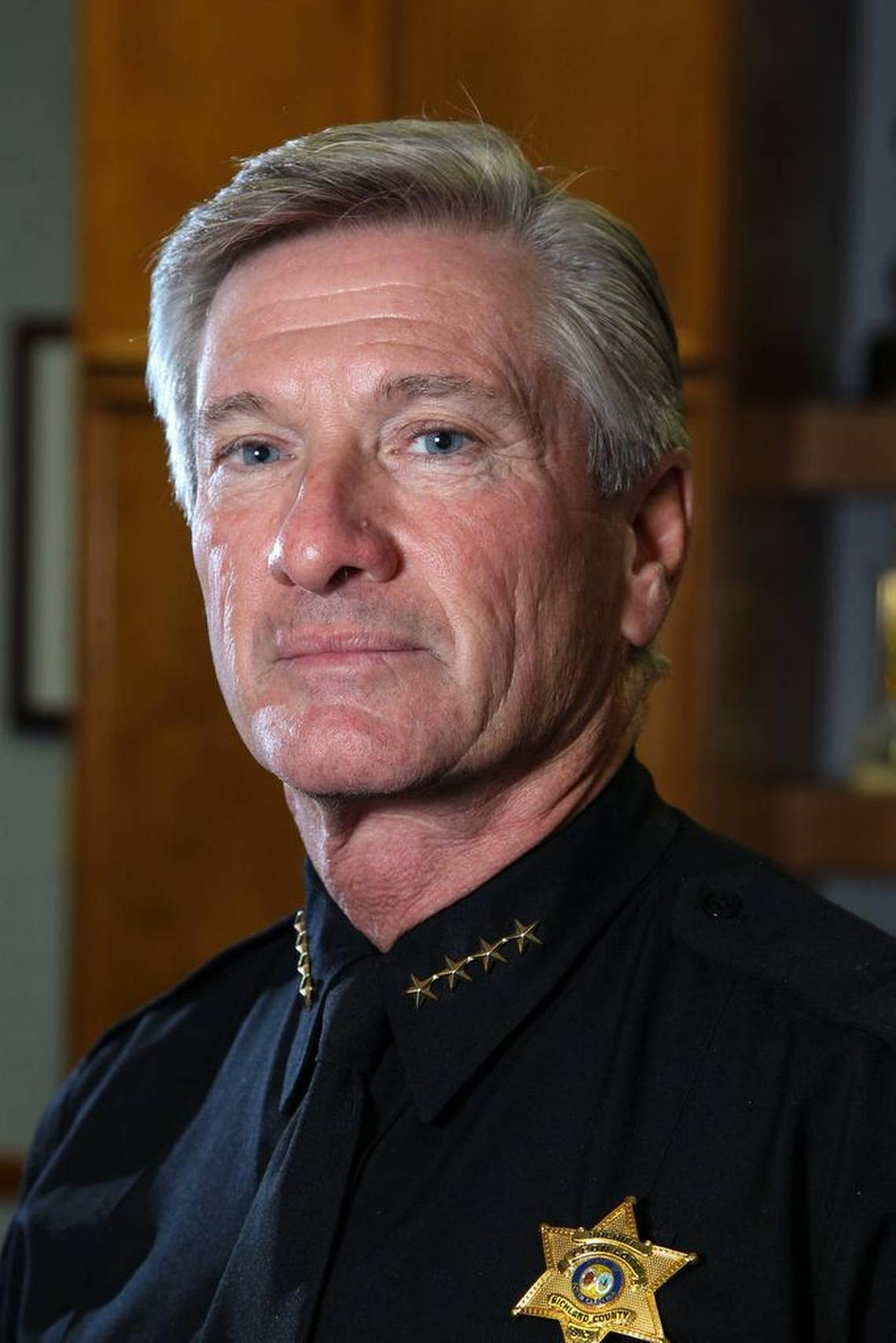
- Lott in 2019

Commander of the South Carolina State Guard
- Incumbent
- Assumed office December 1, 2018
- Governor: Henry McMaster
- Preceded by: Tom Mullikin

Sheriff of Richland County
- Incumbent
- Assumed office January 3, 1997

Personal details
- Born: October 3, 1953 (age 73) Aiken, South Carolina
- Party: Democratic
- Education: University of South Carolina Aiken University of South Carolina Columbia Lander University

Military service
- Allegiance: South Carolina
- Branch/service: South Carolina State Guard
- Rank: Major General

Leon Lott (born 1953) is an American police officer. He is the commander of the South Carolina State Guard and the sheriff of Richland County, South Carolina. He is a member of the Democratic Party.

== Early life ==
Lott was born in 1953, in Aiken, South Carolina, and attended Aiken High School. As a youth, Lott was arrested for throwing eggs at vehicles on Interstate 20. Lott struck the cruiser of the chief investigator for the sheriff's department. While he and a few others were detained, they were not charged. After graduating high school in 1971, he studied at the University of South Carolina Aiken where he earned an associate degree in police administration. He transferred to University of South Carolina to obtain a Bachelor of Science degree in sociology followed by a master's degree in criminal justice. Later, he earned a master's in emergency management from Lander University.

== Career ==
Lott became a patrol officer for Richland County, South Carolina, in 1975. He later served as a narcotic agent, a lieutenant, a captain, and a watch commander. In 1993, Lott was appointed as the police chief of St. Matthews, South Carolina, a small town in Calhoun County. In 1996, Lott campaigned to be sheriff of Richland County as a Democrat, winning the election that November.

=== Sheriff ===
As sheriff, Lott oversees the Richland County Sheriff's Department. As of the 2020 census, the population of Richland County, South Carolina, was 416,147 and is the second-largest county in the state. Lott oversees approximately 1,000 department employees. In 2010, he traveled to the Kurdistan region of Iraq and assisted in the establishment of the first Iraqi female police academy.

In 2016, Lott permitted the A&E network to feature Richland County deputies in the television show Live PD. The show aired through 2020 until it was cancelled amid protests and riots following the murder of George Floyd by a Minnesota police officer. In 2021, Lott stated Richland County would eventually return live to a show by a different name.

In September 2016, Lott fired a deputy that gained national attention for flipping an African American female student onto the floor at Spring Valley High School. Lott mentioned the incident made him want to "throw up"; he terminated the officer and called the FBI and Justice Department to investigate, though the officer was not charged.

In 2019, a school resource officer in Richland County School District Two was publicly accused of inappropriate sexual conduct toward a teenage female. Lott fired and arrested the deputy, Jamel Bradley, and stated, "[Bradley is] a monster that worked among us that we did not know about." But Lott drew criticism from the public when it was revealed that Bradley had more than five reports alleging predatory behavior around minors, but the department had dismissed the claims.

In 2021, Jonathan Pentland, a white drill sergeant at Fort Jackson, was filmed assaulting a black man in Columbia. Lott arrested the soldier and charged him with assault and battery. Lott had initially stated that Pentland may have himself been the victim because the unidentified black man had been vaguely accused of other assaults. Later, the department shifted and said that Pentland was the aggressor. The Post and Courier accused Lott of "victim blaming."

In 2021, Lott was named national Sheriff of the Year by the National Sheriffs' Association, the first person from South Carolina to ever receive the awards.

Lott ranked Number 3 in the Post and Courier Columbia Power List 2023. He ranked Number 4 on the List in 2025.

== South Carolina State Guard ==
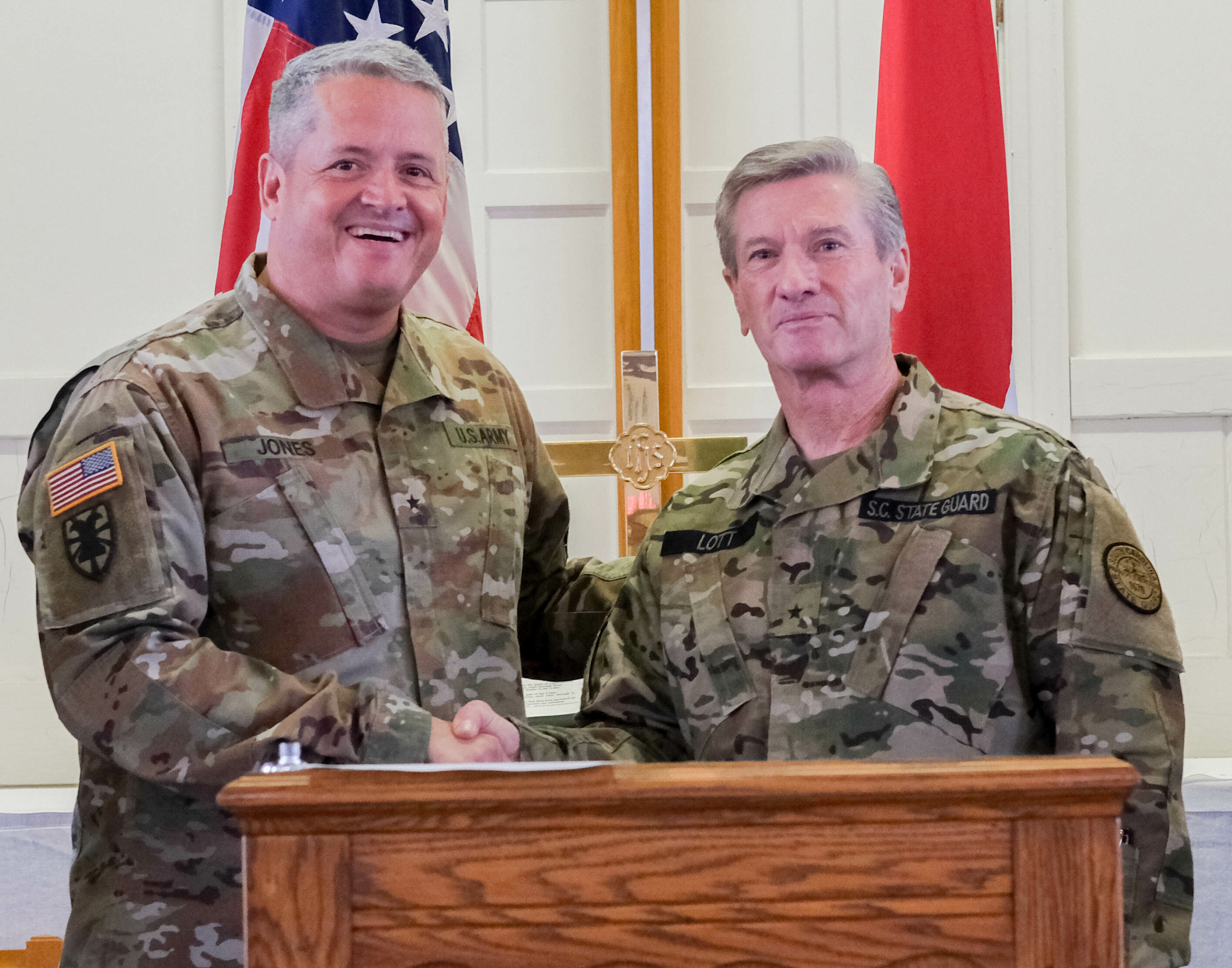
Lott (right) at SC State Guard Training

On December 1, 2018, Lott was promoted to the rank of Brigadier General and took over command of the South Carolina State Guard. The S.C. State Guard serves with the S.C. Army National Guard, the S.C. Air National Guard, and the S.C. Emergency Management Division. Leon Lott was promoted to Major General on February 4, 2023.

== Personal life ==
Lott is married with four children. He is Christian.
