= South Carolina State Guard =

The South Carolina State Guard
- Country: United States
- Allegiance: South Carolina
- Branch: Army
- Type: State Defense Force
- Role: State Defense Force
- Size: 575 (NOV 2024)
- Part of: South Carolina Military Department
- Garrison/HQ: Columbia, South Carolina
- Website: http://www.sg.sc.gov/

Commanders
- Commander-in-Chief: Governor Henry McMaster
- Commander of the SC State Guard: Major General Leon Lott
- Command Sergeant Major of the SC State Guard: Command Sergeant Major Karl de la Guerra

The South Carolina State Guard (SCSG) is the designated state defense force for the state of South Carolina.

The State Guard maintains its headquarters in Columbia. Battalions are located in the cities of Columbia (1st Midlands Battalion), Charleston (3rd Coastal Battalion), and Fountain Inn (2nd Highland Battalion). The Professional Services Command, including the Judge Advocate General section, Medical Detachment, Provost Marshal Command, Engineering Detachment, Search and Rescue Command (SARCOM), and Chaplains Corp are located at the State Guard HQ in Columbia along with the Chief of Staff Command consisting of the Cyber Security, Communications & Electronic Section, Business Development Section, and Public Affairs.

== Status ==
Organized under Section 25-3-10 of the South Carolina Code of Laws, the State Guard is designated as a protective reserve military force under the command of the South Carolina Military Department and the South Carolina Adjutant General. The SC National Guard Adjutant General is responsible for organizing and maintaining the State Guard to fulfill its missions(Sec. 25-3-10) as stipulated in various sections under Title 25, Chapter 3.

Tasked as a state defense force, the State Guard's primary overarching mission is to be prepared to protect and, when called into service by the Governor, protect the citizens and property of the state and uphold the laws of the state. Units are occasionally sent out of state by order of the Governor, as in the aftermath of the September 11 attacks, after Hurricane Katrina and during the Mexican-American War in the mid-1800s. The State Guard is essentially the modern-day continuation of the South Carolina Militia, which has been in existence in some form since before the United States of America became a sovereign nation. The State Guard is composed of non-conscript volunteers, many of whom are veterans of the federal armed services; the federal military reserves, South Carolina Army National Guard, or South Carolina Air National Guard.

When called into service, members of the State Guard are paid according to federal military pay scales (Section 25-3-140: "When units of the State Guard are called into service they shall receive pay equal to the National Guard"). Members were typically unpaid and considered volunteers for their monthly drill time until recently. In FY23-24 members became eligible to receive monthly drill pay. All members being paid receive an equal amount regardless of rank and hours logged so long as the minimum time requirement has been fulfilled for that month. Some Federal and State agencies and private employers provide pay continuance to employees during training during work hours under orders. Guard members also receive certain tax and mileage deductions and, when authorized, reimbursement for travel or special training.

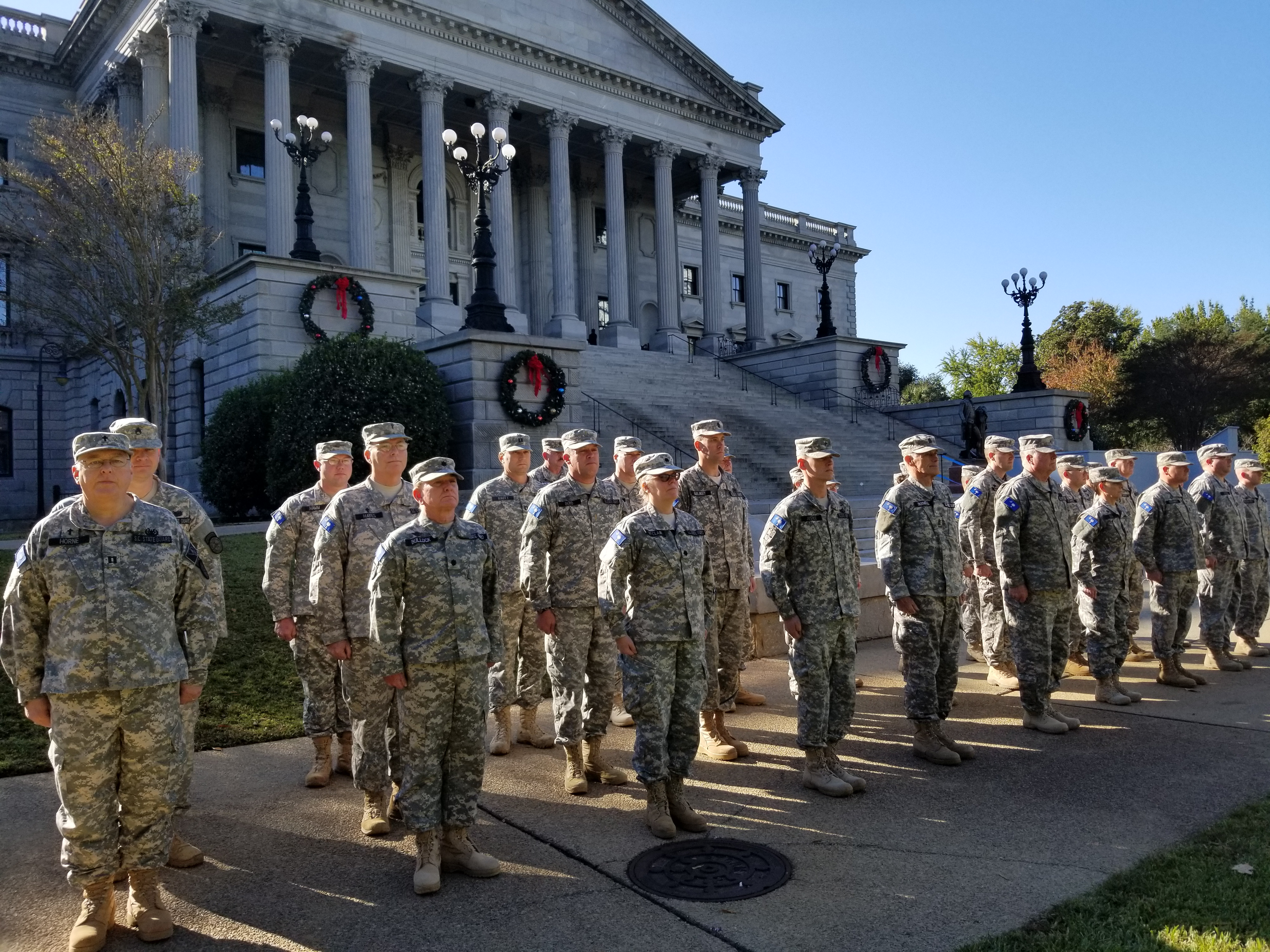
Members of the South Carolina State Guard in formation at the SC State House in Columbia, SC

The Governor of South Carolina has the authority to call into service, the State Guard or any units, at any time the governor deems necessary to protect the lives and property of the citizens of the state, or if there is imminent danger or to protect the laws of the state (Section 25-3-20 & Section 25-3-130). The Governor can also activate units of the State Guard when a significant number of the South Carolina National Guard are out of state for federal service or when augmentation is needed.

To fulfill its state mandated mission, the State Guard maintains a provost marshal detachment (PMD), composed of trained and certified law enforcement officers. These State Guardsmen receive continuous and rigorous training for law enforcement augmentation and other missions as directed. When activated, the PMD may augment state and local law enforcement agencies by contributing armed or unarmed State Guardsmen to assist law enforcement in many different capacities.

== History ==
=== Origins ===
The South Carolina State Guard history traces its history back to the Charleston Militia in 1670. Former Commanders and Brigade Commanders include Francis Marion, Andrew Pickens, Thomas Sumter and William Washington who recaptured the South from British occupation in concert with Continental forces under Major General Nathanael Greene. The frigate South Carolina commanded by the naval component of the State Guard was responsible for capturing tons of gunpowder from the British to supply the state and Continental Armies in the early stages of the war.

State Guard troops were instrumental in defeating the Spanish and securing Florida in the early 1800s and they served with distinction in the War with Mexico, the Civil War, and the Spanish–American War.

=== 20th century ===
The outbreak of World War II in Europe pushed the U.S. government and military to prepare for possible conflict. If the U.S. entered the war, the National Guard would be ordered to active duty overseas, leaving no military force at home to maintain order.

Because of this, the National Defense Act of 1916 was amended on October 21, 1940, to allow the establishment of state defense forces. The South Carolina Legislature's enabling act to establish a state defense force was an Act Establishing the South Carolina Defense Force, signed into law by Governor Burnet R. Maybank on March 21, 1941.

The South Carolina Defense Force (SCDF) was organized into a headquarters, four regiments of three battalions each, and at least one independent battalion. Initially those wishing to enlist or be commissioned had to be between the ages of 21 and 55, in good health, and of good character. The minimum age quickly fell to 17 and there are indications that a few men served at an even younger age. The uniform was to be Confederate gray. This was changed to standard G.I. Olive Drab by 1943. The initial armament was the M1917 Enfield rifle, later changed to a mix of rifles, shotguns, Thompson submachine guns, and a few larger weapons.

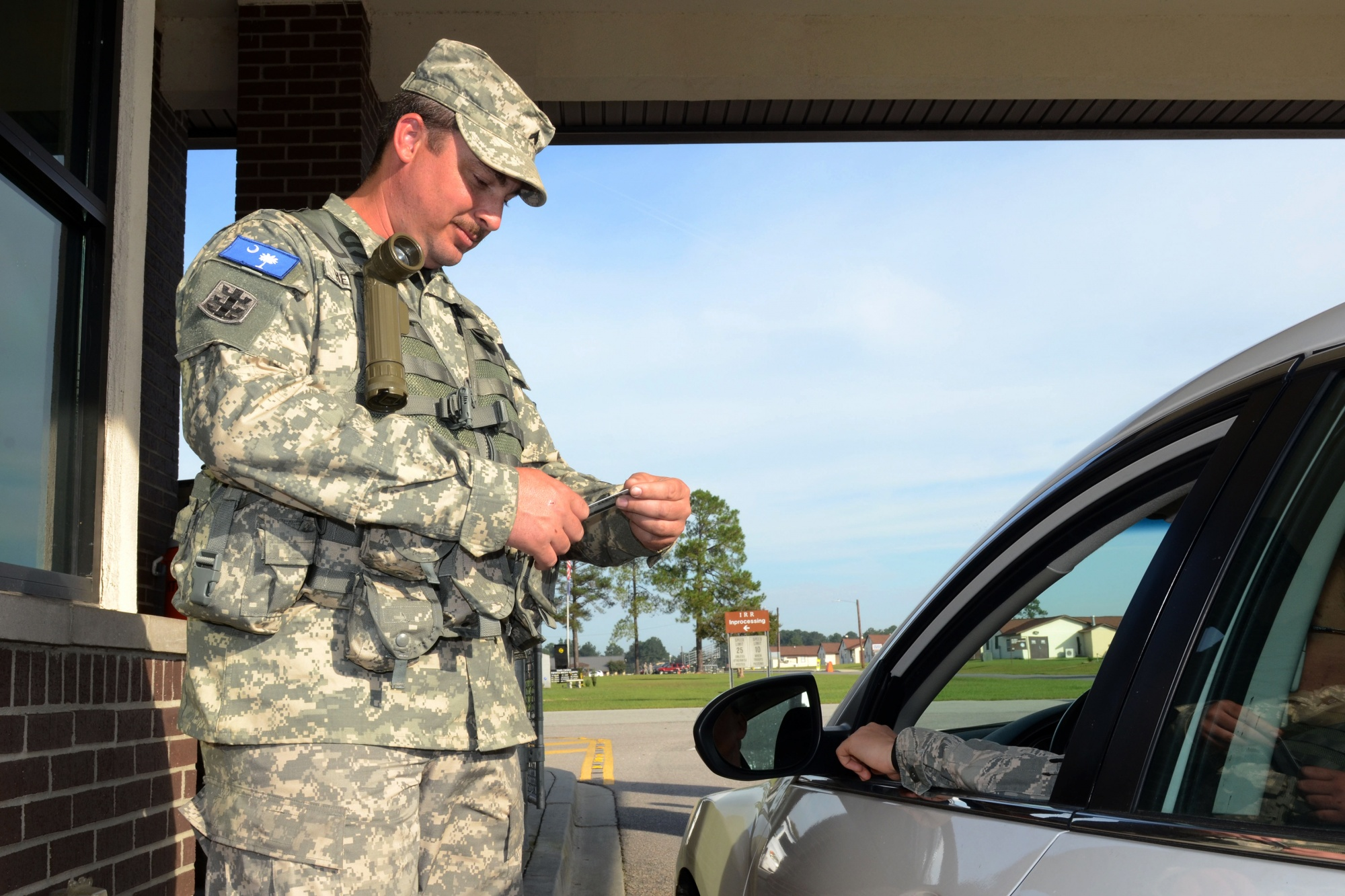
Cpl. Paul Herring, a security augmentee assigned to the 3rd Battalion, 1st Brigade of the South Carolina State Guard, guarding the front gate at McCrady Training Center, S.C.

The men of the SCDF were volunteers, serving without pay unless called into active service by the governor. The authorized strength was 518 officers and 6,035 enlisted men. According to the Adjutant General's report of 2 July 1941 there were 191 officers and 3,060 enlisted men enrolled as of June 30, 1941. (Among the officers was Strom Thurmond, then a second lieutenant in Company L (Edgefield), 3d Battalion, 1st Regiment). By the spring of 1942, the number enrolled had risen to over 6,000.

The mission of the SCDF — renamed the South Carolina State Guard (SCSG) in January 1944 — was to defend against invasion along the South Carolina coast and assist local officials in providing internal security, including search and rescue. While invasion by sea was unlikely, there was a fear that the Germans might land forces by submarine. The SCDF was tasked with holding off enemy forces until troops could be brought in from Fort Jackson.

Most of the time the men drilled and conducted defensive exercises to prepare them in the event an invasion did occur. Occasionally they were called out to provide security for crashed aircraft or after natural disaster. The last official activation of the SCSG was to provide security in Greenville after the Ideal Laundry fire in November 1946. The last known wartime unit, Company E (Greenville), 2d Battalion, 2d Regiment, was mustered out on 8 August 1947.

=== Modern era ===
On 27 February 2018, the Governor of South Carolina, Henry McMaster, signed an executive order declaring a state of emergency in the state's prisons due to the high amount of contraband, such as cell phones, being smuggled into the state's prisons. The executive order directed the SCSG to assist the South Carolina Department of Corrections in securing the prisons by staffing and patrolling the exterior of the state's correctional facilities.

In September 2018, 285 State Guardsmen were activated to serve alongside the National Guard during Hurricane Florence.

November 2019, the State Guard chartered the “Swamp Fox” Explorer Post 1670 through the national division of Exploring (Learning for Life) for youth 14 to 20 years of age.

In April 2020, members of the South Carolina State Guard were activated to assist in South Carolina's response to the COVID-19 pandemic. Preparing for a potential shortage of hospital space, SCSG engineers vetted potential alternate care locations throughout the state against criteria from the United States Army Corps of Engineers. In Charleston, the SCSG assisted the Medical University of South Carolina by transforming a wellness facility into a 250-bed field hospital for potential patients.

== Insignia and uniform ==
The State Guard currently wears standard US Army OCPs with modified black and grey nametapes. The left shoulder holds the State Guard patch and brigade/detachment identification tab while the right shoulder holds the SC State Flag and federal service unit patches, if applicable. Prior service soldiers may also wear skill badges earned while in federal service.

SCSG dress uniforms are similar to the U.S. Army Service Uniform (Class A and B) with distinctive unit insignia. Soldiers may wear all ribbons and awards earned while in federal service in addition to any earned while in service of South Carolina.

== Legal protection ==
Employers within the borders of South Carolina must, under South Carolina law, grant a leave of absence to employees who are members of the South Carolina State Guard (or any other state's state defense force) whenever they are activated for training or in response to an emergency mission. Employers are required to reinstate these employees to their employment position when they return from their deployment, without loss of seniority, status, or salary.

== Awards and decorations ==
The South Carolina issues several awards and decorations to its members, including the following:

- South Carolina Medal of Valor
- SCSG Distinguished Service Medal
- SCSG Medal of Merit
- SCSG Meritorious Service Medal
- SCSG Commendation Medal
- SCSG Home Defense Achievement Ribbon
- SCSG Individual Achievement Ribbon
- SCSG Good Conduct Ribbon
- SCSG Longevity Service Medal
- SCSG Golden Anniversary Ribbon
- SCSG Federal Service School Ribbon
- SCSG Humanitarian Service Ribbon
- SCSG Service Ribbon
- SCSG Emergency Service Training Ribbon
- SCSG Volunteer Service Ribbon
- SCSG Honors Detail Service Ribbon
- SCSG Military Readiness Ribbon
- SCSG Recruiting Achievement Ribbon
- SCSG Military Proficiency Ribbon
- South Carolina Governor's Unit Citation
- SCSG Outstanding Unit Citation
- SCSG Unit Achievement Award

== See also ==
- South Carolina National Guard
- South Carolina Naval Militia
- South Carolina Wing Civil Air Patrol
