= Lakatamia Air Force Base =

Military airport in Nicosia, Cyprus

Lakatamia Air Force Base
- Αεροπορική Βάση Λακατάμιας
- Lakatamia, Nicosia in Cyprus
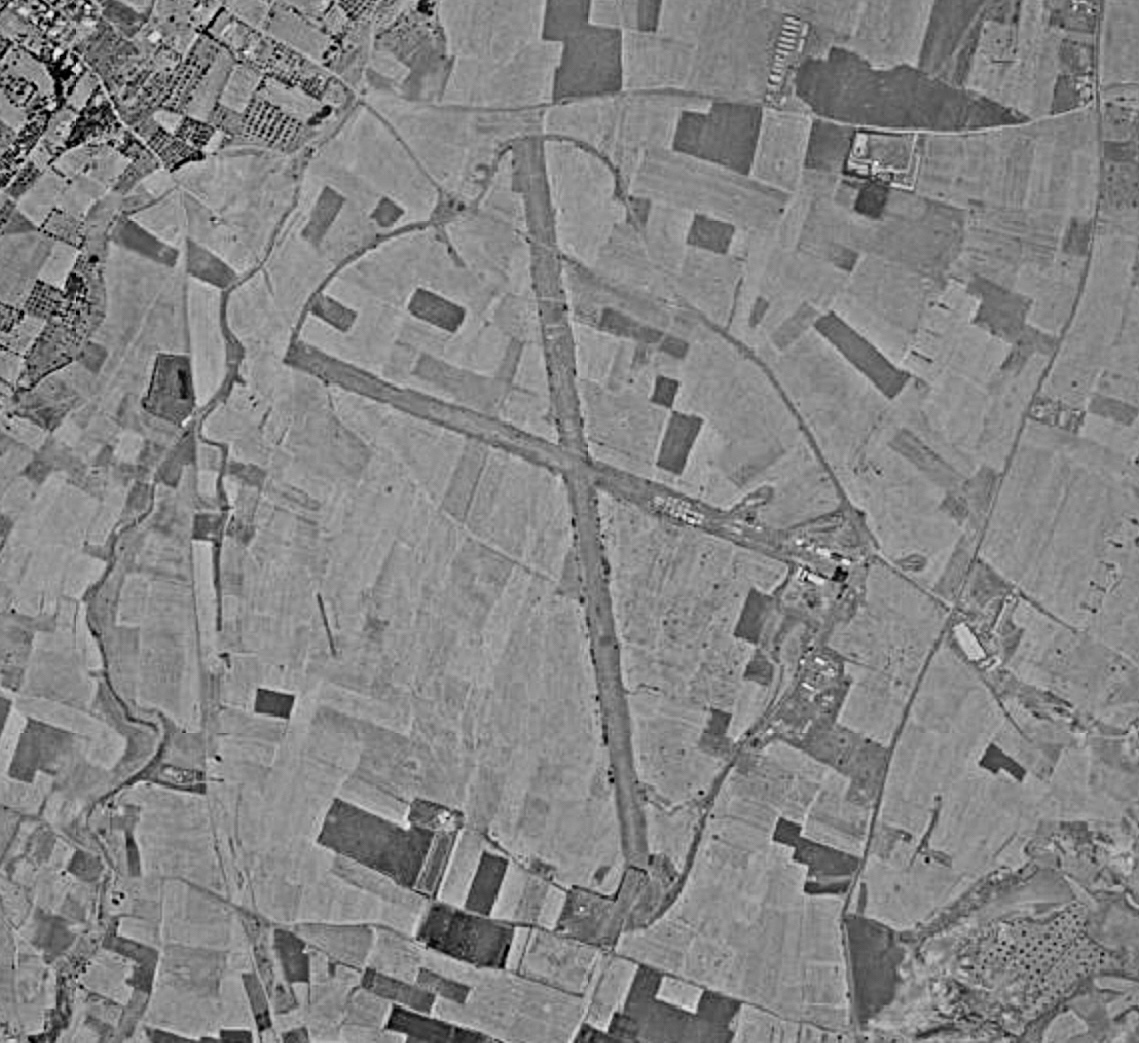
- Declassified satellite imagery of Lakatamia AFB captured by KH-9 on 20 July, 1974. The airfield is depicted before reactivation by Cypriot armed forces.

Site information
- Type: Reserve airbase
- Owner: Republic of Cyprus
- Operator: Cyprus Air Command
- Condition: Active

Location
- Shown within Cyprus
- Coordinates: 35.095°N 33.316°E

Site history
- Built: 1941
- In use: 1941 — 1945 Royal Air Force; 1955 — 1959 Army Air Corps; 1974 — present Cyprus Air Command
- Battles/wars: Mediterranean and Middle East Theatre; Cyprus Emergency

Garrison information
- Garrison: No. 420 (Air Base Protection) Squadron

Airfield information
- Identifiers: ICAO: LCRO
Runways
Direction	Length and surface
17/35	1,430 metres (4,692 ft) Asphalt
11/29	1,200 metres (3,937 ft) Asphalt
Helipads
Number	Length and surface
	541 metres (1,775 ft)

Lakatamia Air Force Base (ICAO: LCRO) is a reserve airbase housing the headquarters of Cyprus Air Command, located in Lakatamia, Nicosia, Cyprus. It was established in 1941 during the Second World War, and operated as a Royal Air Force base until the cessation of hostilities in 1945. It was reactivated during the Cyprus Emergency in 1955, and remained operational until British withdrawal in 1960. After the Turkish Invasion of Cyprus, the nearby Nicosia Airport was turned over to the UN in an agreement with the Cyprus government and Lakatamia AFB was reactivated by the Cypriot National Guard in 1974.

== History ==
=== World War II ===
During World War II in 1941, Royal Air Force (RAF) Lakatamia was established as part of a defensive effort by Australian, Indian, and British garrisoned troops. It was equipped with two asphalt runways, a perimeter taxiway, and underground blast pens. RAF Lakatamia was among seven other wartime-built airfields, including Nicosia, Larnaca, Limassol, Paphos, Peristerona, Salamis, and Tymbou.

On 25 September 1943, four Bristol Beaufighters each from the 227 and 252 Squadron RAF took off from Lakatamia to attack German destroyer TA 10. At the time of which, it was beached on southern Rhodes after action with HMS Eclipse two days earlier. Through April 1944, the No. 680 Squadron RAF, Mediterranean Air Command, flew photo-reconnaissance missions over the Dodecanese islands from the base. After the war, RAF Lakatamia was retained for future operational use. For several years, it held the British Forces Broadcasting Service.

=== Cyprus Emergency ===
During the onset of the Cyprus Emergency in 1955, RAF Lakatamia was reactivated and began operating as an Air Observation Post for the Army Air Corps. On 4 April 1956, the No. 1910 Flight was reformed at RAF Lakatamia, primarily operating for air observation. In May 1956, the No. 1915 Light Liaison Flight was newly formed and joined the No. 1910 at the base. Auster AOP.6 aircraft commonly flew aerial observation and leaflet-dropping missions from the airfield. During operations, tents and equipment were often housed on a runway. Following the end of the conflict and Cypriot independence on 15 August 1960, the British withdrew from the base.

=== Cyprus Air Command ===
Under Cypriot control, the airfield remained disused as Cypriot armed forces operated at the nearby Nicosia airport. By the late 1960s, Lakatamia Air Base was classified as ‘Not Usable’. Following the 1974 Turkish invasion of Cyprus, Lakatamia AFB was taken over and reactivated by the National Guard as a helicopter base. The decision was fuelled by the nearby Turkish occupation of Nicosia. Segments of the disused runways were reinstated for operational use. During the 1980s, numerous new equipment were purchased for use by the No. 449th MAE. Three Bell 206L-3s were acquired in 1987, four Aérospatiale SA 342L1 Gazelles in 1988 and two Pilatus PC-9s in 1989. All of which were subsequently based at Lakatamia, while fixed-wing aircraft were based at Paphos International Airport.

In June 2024, following the Gaza–Israel conflict, Lakatamia AFB was listed as one of Hezbollah’s potential attack targets, as a threat for Israel to stop operating in Cyprus's bases. Every November 8th, the Cyprus Air Force holds an opening day in honour of Archangel Michael, known as the Protector of the Air Force. At Lakatamia AFB, various helicopters would be open for display. Currently, Lakatamia AFB is operated by the Cyprus National Guard Air Wing as a staging-post for helicopters.

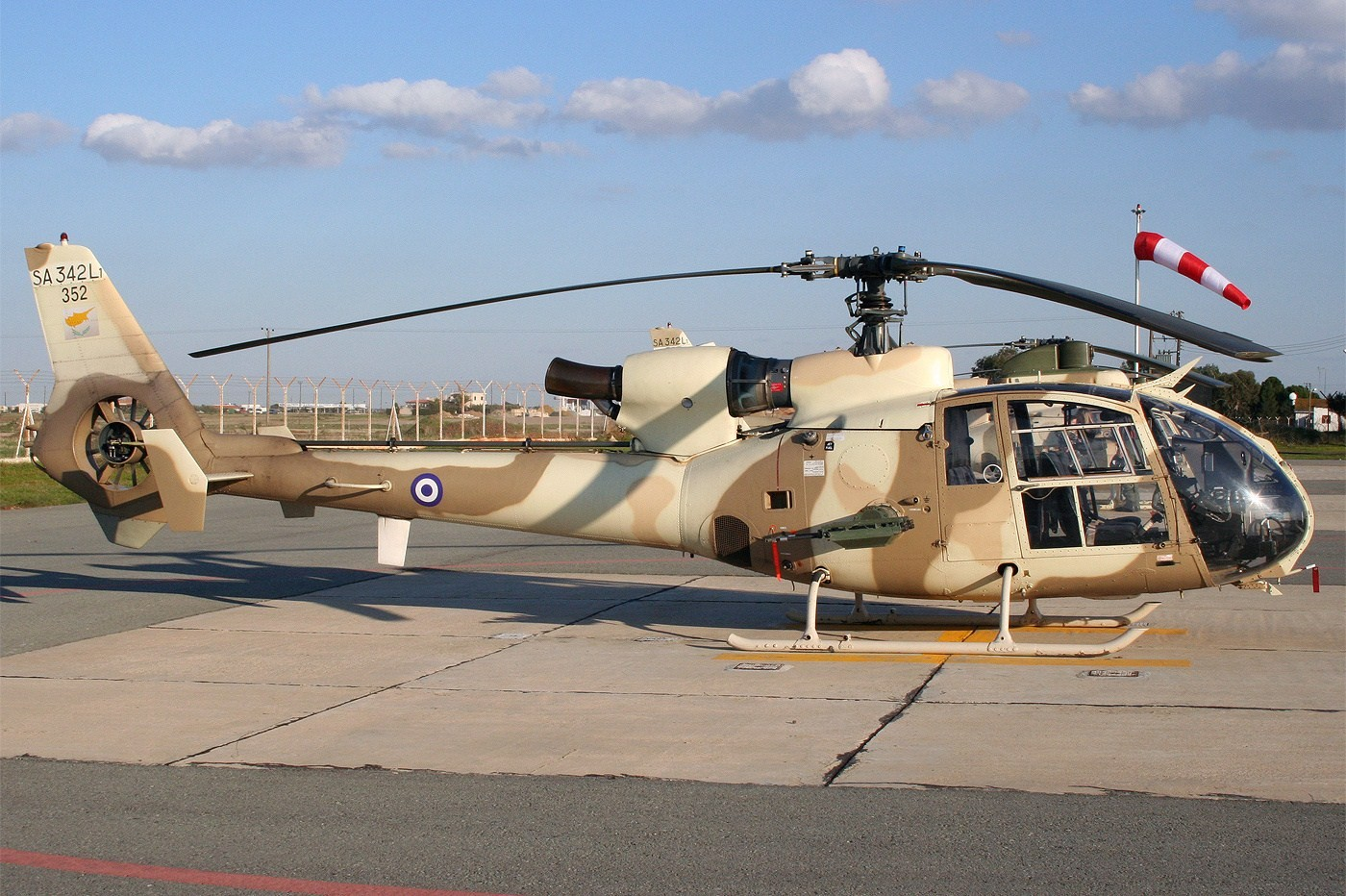
The Cyprus Air Force holds the annual open day on the 8 November. Among other helicopters, this example was on display in Lakatamia Air Base.

== Units ==
The following lists RAF usage and Cypriot usage of Lakatamia.

World War II

- Detachment from No. 46 Squadron RAF between May 1942 and January 1943 with the Bristol Beaufighter IF
- Detachment from No. 127 Squadron RAF between March and July 1943 with the Supermarine Spitfire VC
- Detachment from No. 154 (Motor Industries) Squadron RAF between December 1943 and February 1944 with the Spitfire XI
- Detachment from No. 162 Squadron RAF between April and September 1944 with the Vickers Wellington X
- Detachment from No. 203 Squadron RAF between June 1941 and January 1942 with the Bristol Blenheim IV
- Detachment from No. 213 (Ceylon) Squadron RAF between February and May 1944 with the Spitfire IX
- No. 227 Squadron RAF between 23 September and 31 November 1943 with the Beaufighter X & XI
- Detachment from No. 232 Squadron RAF between December 1943 and February 1944 with the Spitfire VC
- No. 252 Squadron RAF between 23 September and 16 December 1943 with the Beaufighter XI
- Detachment from No. 294 Squadron RAF between September 1943 and March 1944 with the Wellington IC
- Detachment from No. 451 Squadron RAAF between February 1942 and January 1943 with the Hawker Hurricane I
- Detachment from No. 454 Squadron RAAF between August and November 1943 with the Martin Baltimore IV
- Detachment from No. 603 (City of Edinburgh) Squadron AAF between June and December 1942 with the Spitfire VC
- Detachment from No. 680 Squadron RAF between February and August 1943 with the Spitfire IX

Non-flying units

- No. 166 Maintenance Unit RAF between November 1943 and September 1945
- Satellite airfield of No. 79 OTU between October 1944 and July 1945
- No. 56 Refuelling & Re-Arming Party RAF during 1942 and 1944
- No. 58 Refuelling & Re-Arming Party RAF during December 1943
- No. 4 Repair & Salvage Unit during November 1942
- No. 237 Wing between September and December 1943

Cyprus Emergency (1955 — 1959)

- No. 1565 Meteorological Flight RAF with the Hurricane IIC
- No. 1908 Air Observation Post Flight RAF between 1955 and 1956 with the Auster AOP.6
- No. 1910 Air Observation Post Flight RAF between April and September 1956 with the Auster AOP.6
- No. 1915 Light Liaison Flight RAF between May and September 1956 with the Auster AOP.6

Post-independence (1960 — present)

- No. 449 (Anti-Tank Helicopter) Squadron
- No. 420 (Air Base Protection) Squadron
