= RAF Limassol =

Former RAF military airport in Limassol, Cyprus

RAF Limassol
- Limassol, Limassol District in Cyprus

Site information
- Owner: Air Ministry
- Operator: Royal Air Force
- Condition: Demolished

Location
- Shown within Cyprus RAF Limassol (Europe) RAF Limassol (Middle East)
- Coordinates: 34°40′28.18″N 33°00′32.32″E

Site history
- Built: 1941
- In use: 1941 — 1946-8
- Battles/wars: Mediterranean and Middle East Theatre

Airfield information
Runways
Direction	Length and surface
00/00

RAF Limassol is a former Royal Air Force station located in Limassol on the southern coast of Cyprus. It was established in 1941 during the Second World War, supporting Royal Air Force operations over the Axis-controlled Dodecanese Islands.

== History ==
During the Second World War in 1941, an airfield was established at Limassol as part of a defensive effort led by garrisoned troops from Australia, India, and Britain. Limassol was among seven others, including Nicosia, Larnaca, Lakatamia, Peristerona, Paphos, Salamis, and Tymbou.

The German Dodecanese campaign began on 8 September 1943, aimed at seizing control of the strategic Dodecanese islands in the Aegean Sea in response to the Italian Armistice of Cassibile. The Luftwaffe launched the first airstrikes at Kos on 18 September, deactivating the Island's only airstrip. By October, the loss of Kos had altered the strategic situation in the Aegean Sea. As a result, RAF Limassol became the only operational Allied airfield in the region, and its aircraft were incapable of supporting remaining Allied control over the Dodecanese. The RAF Bristol Beaufighters operating from the airfield could not stand up to the Luftwaffe's Messerschmitt Bf 109s and Focke-Wulf Fw 190s, while Supermarine Spitfires with drop tanks lacked the flying range.

=== Closure ===
After the Second World War, RAF Limassol was surplus to the RAF's post-war needs and was subsequently closed in 1946, although other sources give the closure as 1948. Afterwards, the airfield's runway was used by a driving school. Progressively, the disused runway was dug up before full redevelopment by the 1950s. The urban growth of Limassol had completely swallowed what was left of the airfield, leaving little traces. In September 1969, Primary School No. 13 was opened on the former airfield's area and was informally named "Primary School of the Old Airstrip."

In 1974, the USSR took the initiative to propose the construction of a new airfield in Limassol. The project was to replace the Nicosia International Airport, which had been heavily bombed during the Turkish invasion of Cyprus. However, the Cypriot government chose another former airfield in Larnaca, which later became Larnaca International Airport today. Up until the 2000s, residents frequently called the area of the former airfield "Aerodromio." Today, the only wartime building that remains is the substation located opposite to the Church of St. Spyridon.

== Units ==
The following units that were based at RAF Limassol:

- No. 227 Squadron RAF between 16 August 1943 and 23 September 1943, equipped with Beaufighter VIC
- No. 252 Squadron RAF between 11 September 1943 and 23 September 1943, equipped with Beaufighter XI
- No. 294 Squadron RAF detachment between 5 October 1943 and 29 March 1944, equipped with Wellington IC
