= Lod Airbase =

Former Israeli air force base in Lod

Lod Israeli Air Force Base Air Force Base 27
- Lod, Central District in Israel

Site information
- Type: Airbase
- Owner: Israel Defense Forces
- Operator: Israeli Air Force

Location
- Shown within Israel
- Coordinates: 32°00′41″N 034°53′18″E

Site history
- Built: 1934
- In use: 1938-48 RAF Use; 1948 – 2008

Airfield information
- Identifiers: IATA: TLV, ICAO: LLBG
Runways
Direction	Length and surface
03/21	Asphalt
08/26	Asphalt
12/30	Asphalt

Lod Airbase, also Air Force Base 27, was an Israeli Air Force (IAF) airbase that was part of the Ben Gurion International Airport, located approximately 7 km (4 mi) north of Lod; 8 km (5 mi) east-southeast of Tel Aviv.

From 1938 to 1948 it was known as RAF Lydda while under British Royal Air Force control.

== History ==
The Lydda Airport, built in 1934, was used by the Allies during World War II becoming RAF Lydda on 1 March 1943. After the Israeli declaration of independence in May 1948, it became an IAF airbase and the only international airport in the new state of Israel. The airbase part officially closed down on 2 August 2008, after its last units moved to Nevatim Airbase in the Negev. On the same airfield the Ben Gurion International Airport is still operating as the main airport of Israel.

=== RAF Operational units ===
- No. 14 Squadron RAF between 26 October and 4 November 1941 with the Bristol Blenheim IV
- No. 33 Squadron RAF between 21 October 1938 and 24 April 1939 with the Gloster Gladiator I
- No. 55 Squadron RAF between 29 August 1942 and 7 March 1943 with the Martin Baltimore
- No. 134 Squadron RAF between 6 July and 16 November 1942 with the Supermarine Spitfire VB
- No. 162 Squadron RAF between 12 April 1942 and 27 August 1943 with the Bristol Blenheim V
- No. 203 Squadron RAF between 30 April and 20 June 1941 with the Bristol Blenheim IV
- No. 211 Squadron RAF between 30 April and 10 May 1941 with the Bristol Blenheim I
- No. 294 Squadron RAF between 29 March 1944 and 6 June 1945 with the Vickers Wellington
- No. 459 Squadron RAAF between 18 December 1942 and 5 April 1944 with the Lockheed Hudson III
- No. 1413 (Meteorological) Flight RAF (1942–1943 and 1945)

Between July and November 1942, the US Army, Middle East Air Force – USAMEAF operated Boeing B-17 Flying Fortress and Consolidated B-24 Liberator aircraft from RAF Lydda. These aircraft were reassigned to Egypt in November.

== See also ==
- List of former Royal Air Force stations
- List of North African airfields during World War II
