= Shaibah Air Base =

Military airbase in Basra Province, Iraq

Shaibah Airport Shaibah Logistics Base Shaibah/Wahda Air Base RAF Shaibah
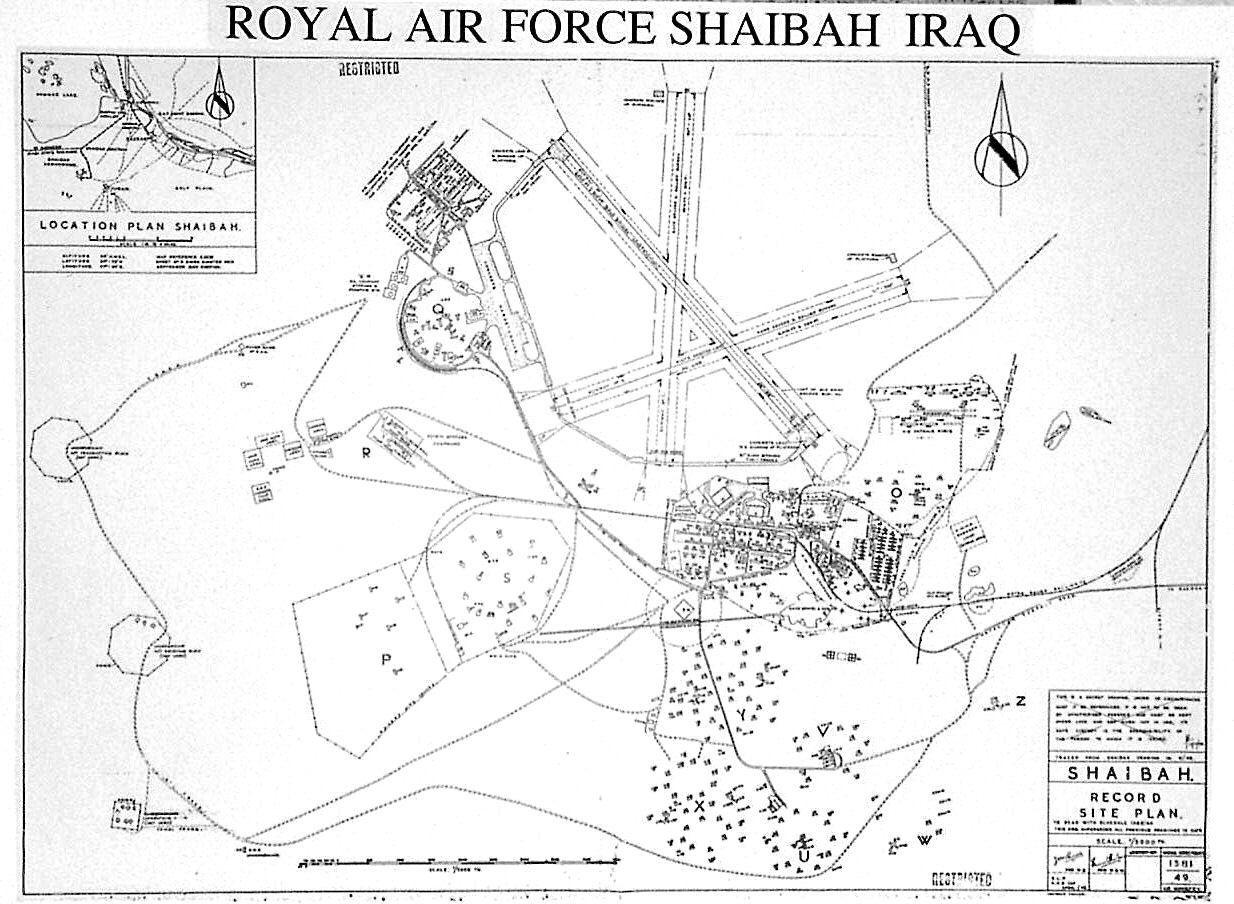
- Map of RAF Shaibah, 1947
- IATA: none; ICAO: none

Summary
- Airport type: Private; Ex-military
- Owner: Iraqi Government
- Operator: Iraqi Army; Iraqi Air Force
- Serves: Shaibah
- Location: Shaibah, Basra Province
- Built: 1920
- In use: 1920 - present
- Elevation AMSL: 276 ft (84 m)
- Coordinates: 30°25′34″N 047°38′34″E

Map
- Location in Iraq

Runways
Direction	Length		Surface
Direction	ft	m	Surface
00/00	0	0	Asphalt
00/00	0	0	Asphalt
00/00	0	0	Asphalt

Shaibah Air Base (formerly Wahda Air Base before 2003) is an Iraqi Air Force airfield in the Basrah Governorate of Iraq.

== History ==
=== Royal Air Force use ===
It was established by the Royal Air Force in 1920 as RAF Station Shaibah, a small and primitive airfield in the desert with a harsh hot and humid climate. A 1930 treaty guaranteed British use till the mid-50s. The resident squadron was No. 84 Squadron RAF until 1940 when No. 244 Squadron RAF took over. It expanded during the Second World War. No 244 Sqn was involved in the Rashid Ali rebellion in 1941. Nos 37 and 70 Squadrons (Vickers Wellingtons) operated from Shaibah in support of RAF Habbaniya. On 24 April that year, 400 men of the King's Own Royal Regiment were "flown by No. 31 Squadron [from India via] Shaibah to RAF Habbaniya to reinforce the armoured cars of No. 1 RAF Armoured Car Company." RAF Shaibah was under the control of the RAF's Air Headquarters Iraq.

At this time several units were located at Shaibah. They included:

- Aircraft Erection Unit (Iraq and Persia) formed here on 2 April 1943 staying until 5 January 1945
- No. 34 Air Despatch & Reception Unit - formed here 1943 - absorbed into No. 42 Staging Post during September 1944
- No. 981 (Balloon) Squadron between July 1942 and 6 September 1942
- No. 983 (Balloon) Squadron between 1 December 1942 and 7 February 1943
- Central Air Communication Section between 16 March 1920 and 31 March 1922
- Central Air Communication Section, Mesopotamia formed here 1920, staying until 31 March 1920
- Defence Flight, Iraq formed here on 15 June 1943 staying until 25 August 1943, moved to RAF Abadan
- No. 1358 Pampa Flight formed here on 31 January 1946, disbanding on 10 April 1946
- No. 218 Group HQ between 15 November 1942 and 17 April 1943
- No. 115 Maintenance Unit RAF between 1 October 1942 and 1 March 1945
- No. 119 Maintenance Unit RAF between 19 October 1941 and 1 July 1945
- No. 27 Personnel Transit Centre formed here on 1 June 1942, staying until 15 December 1943
- No. 157 Repair & Salvage Unit formed here on 1 July 1945, staying until10 November 1945
- No. 42 Staging Post formed here on 1 November 1942 and was disbanded into RAF Shaibah on 1 August 1945.
- Shaibah Station Flight operating aircraft such as: Hawker Audax I, Gloster Gladiator II, Bristol Blenheim IV, Martin Baltimore III, Airspeed Oxford & Avro Anson XI & C.19
- No. 115 (Transport) Wing HQ between 24 October 1945 and 22 November 1945
- Detachment from 'S' Squadron between 1939 and 1940 with Vickers Vincent aircraft

Squadrons:

- No. 6 Squadron RAF between 18 June and 19 September 1951 with Vampire FB.5
- No. 8 Squadron RAF between 31 May and 8 September 1951 with Bristol Brigand B.1, Anson C.19 & Auster AOP.6
- No. 30 Squadron RAF detachment between October 1927 and October 1929 with the de Havilland DH.9A
- No. 31 Squadron RAF detachment between April and September 1941 with the Douglas DC-2
- No. 32 Squadron RAF between 14 January and 16 October 1955 with the de Havilland Venom FB.1
- No. 37 Squadron RAF between 17 December 1940 and 27 April 1942 with the Wellington IC
- No. 55 Squadron RAF between 1 November 1924 and February 1930 with the DH.9A
- No. 70 Squadron RAF detachment between September 1940 and 17 January 1942 with the Wellington IC
- No. 73 Squadron RAF between 5 January and 25 March 1954 with the de Havilland Vampire FB.9
- No. 74 Squadron RAF between December 1942 and 17 May 1943 with the Hawker Hurricane IIB
- No. 84 Squadron RAF between 21 April 1924 and 24 September 1940 with DH.9A, Wapiti, Vincent & Bristol Blenheim I
- No. 162 Squadron RAF detachment between April and July 1942 with the Blenheim IV
- No. 244 Squadron RAF between 1 November 1940 and May 1942 with the Vincent & Blenheim IV
- No. 249 (Gold Coast) Squadron RAF between 14 July and 24 October 1951 with the Vampire FB.5
- No. 261 Squadron RAF between 10 August and 27 September 1941 with the Gladiator I & Hurricane I
- No. 680 Squadron RAF detachment between February 1945 and July 1946
- No. 683 Squadron RAF detachment between 24 September and 18 December 1951

No. 5153 Squadron of the Airfield Construction Branch RAF was engaged in building works at Shaibah during the war.

Squadron Leader Kenneth Hubbard was Station Commander of RAF Shaibah in 1951-53 when the station was involved in the evacuation of the British personnel from Abadan in Persia/Iran. He received the Order of the British Empire in 1953.

=== Early Iraqi Air Force use (1956–1990) ===
On 1 March 1956 it was handed over to the Iraqi Air Force, and it then became an Iraqi Air Force airfield. After that it was renamed to 'Al-Wahda' or Wahda Air Base.

The airfield was bombed by a flight of four Mk.82-equipped McDonnell Douglas F-4 Phantom IIs as part of the Operation Revenge launched by the Iranian Air Force two hours after the Iraqi invasion of Iran in 1980. According to Iranian sources, the Mikoyan-Gurevich MiG-25s and some Mikoyan-Gurevich MiG-23 were stationed in this airbase. The airbase was again bombed in the by raid Operation Kaman 99 on the second day of the war.

Early on May 17, 1987, a modified Iraqi Air Force Dassault Falcon 50 of No. 81 Squadron was redeployed from Saddam Air Base to Wahda. This aircraft, nicknamed "Susanna" by the Iraqis was then loaded with two AM.39 Exocet cruise missiles for its first test/combat flight. Just after dark, the order "Let the bird fly" was given, signalling Susanna to take off and conduct a sortie over the Persian Gulf as part of the Tanker War. The Falcon 50 fired both of its missiles at unknown ship that it detected on radar and returned to Wahda. This ship turned out to be the Oliver Hazard Perry-class frigate USS Stark (FFG-31) leading to the USS Stark Incident.

=== 1991 Gulf War and abandonment ===
At 4:05AM on 17 January 1991, a mixed formation of four Grumman A-6E TRAM Intruders from VA-115 Eagles and VA-185 Nighthawks from the USS Midway attacked the airfield at 350 feet (110 m) above the ground. The aircraft encountered heavier anti-aircraft artillery (AAA) defences than the other Intruder formation from Midway attacking Ahmad al-Jaber Airfield. As a result of the AAA at Wahda, the Midway pilots decided not to attack from low level in the future.

On the evening of 17 January, four RAF Panavia Tornados attacked Wahda with JP233 anti-runway dispensers. Just after the attack, ZA392, a Tornado GR.1 from No. 617 Sq, crewed by Wing Commander Nigel Elsdon and Flight Lieutenant Max Collier, impacted the ground with no survivors.

On 23 January at 10:00AM, Midway launched aircraft again to attack Wahda. This strike however included both Intruders and McDonnell Douglas F/A-18A Hornet. The strike force encountered light AAA with the aircraft bombing the hangars and ammunition storage facilities on the base.

On 31 January, another RAF attack took place, this time with the US Navy. Between 08:35 and 08:40M local time (17:35Z–17:40Z), RAF Tornados attacked the hangars, despite the bombs on the lead aircraft failing to be dropped. The USN strike package included six A-6E Intruders, an Grumman EA-6B Prowler, an A-6E SWIP (Note: A-6E TRAM upgraded with the AN/ALR-67 RWR and ability to carry the AGM-88 HARM, AGM-62 Walleye, AGM-84E SLAM and AGM-65 Maverick. Several versions had new composite wings.) Intruder from VA-145 equipped with AGM-88 HARMs (Note: A-6E Intruders: 1976-1996 states that only the SWIP Intruder could fire the HARM, since the strike took place close to the Persian Gulf, it most likely would've been from VA-145 onboard the USS Ranger.) and four Grumman F-14 Tomcats.

It was abandoned after Operation Desert Storm.

=== 2003 US-led invasion of Iraq ===
It was captured by Coalition forces during the Iraq War of 2003 and it became the site of a British Military Hospital and the Shaibah Logistics Base (SLB), but the original RAF buildings remain. While the SLB was in operation it was home to British, Dutch, Czech, Danish and Norwegian forces.

The following British units were posted here at some point under Operation Telic:

- 29 Armoured Engineer Squadron, 35 Engineer Regiment attached to 28 Engineer Regiment constructing a 1,500 man expeditionary camping infrastructure (ECI).
- 14 Independent Topographic Squadron, Royal Engineers
- 150 Transport Regiment RLC(V) personnel on attachment to 1 (GS) Regt RLC during Op Telic 1
- 156 Regiment RLC (V) Deployed as 236 Sqn RLC (V) with attachments from 150 Regt RLC (V) and 157 Regt RLC (V) as a fully-formed transport Sqn. The first Territorial Army (TA) formed unit to be compulsorily mobilised since World War 2
- 160 Transport Regiment (V) RLC on attachment to 2 (Close Support) Battalion REME, from 28 February 2003 until 19 August 2003.
- Tyne Tees Regiment - in turn, platoon Light Infantry and Royal Regiment of Fusiliers, then Green Howards and East of England Regiment (Royal Anglian, under OPCON Tyne Tees).July 2003-Jan 2004 Telic 2 and 3.
- East of England Regiment (Volunteers) (EER(V)) during Operation Telic 1, 2 and 6 maintaining the security of the base.
- 105th Regiment Royal Artillery attached to 19th Regiment Royal Artillery during Op Telic 5 as 13 Headquarters (HQ) Battery.
- 200 Battery, Royal Artillery between May 2004 and February 2005.
- 210 Battery, Royal Artillery (V) providing force protection during Telic 4.
- 220 Battery, 104th Regiment, Royal Artillery Telic 4 between April 2004 and December 2004 providing force protection until December 2004 when the RDG took over.
- 269 Battery, Royal Artillery.
- 8 Tpt Regiment (8LSR) between May 2004 and November 2004 consisting of 3 Tank Transporter Squadron, 5 GT Squadron & 13 GT Squadron (including a Troop and individual augmentees from the Scottish Transport Regiment).
- A detachment 9 Supply Regiment from March 2003 until unknown.
- 84 Medical Supply Squadron, RAMC between August 2003 and unknown.
- 22 Field Hospital.
- 207 (Manchester) Field Hospital (Volunteers) providing the lead unit for the field hospital between April 2004 and August 2004.
- A Company, 1st Battalion The Royal Irish Regiment.
- 202 (Midlands) Field Hospital (Volunteers) between May 2003 and July 2003
- Royal Army Veterinary Corps.

In 2007 the SLB was handed over to the Iraqi Army on Op Telic 9 by a specialist reconnaissance troop from 38 Engineer Regiment.

34 field hospital, op telic 1 - 34 Field Hospital was made up of regular troops from their base in Strensall just outside York and members for volunteer reserve units from all over the country. A small 25-bed hospital was sent across the Kuwait-Iraq border in the early days of the war. On arrival at Shaibah, the hospital was set up and ready to take casualties within six and a half hours. Everything that you would expect in a modern hospital was present with an Emergency Department, X-ray, Labs, Surgical Theatres x 2, ITU and a hospital ward.

In effect, the hospital was based on the front line of the British area of responsibility and was the furthest forward medical unit in recent history. Casualties would often miss out the regimental aid posts and dressing stations and go straight to the hospital. Staff at the hospital worked 12-hour shifts without days off until more staff began to arrive around a month later. The 25-bed unit kept working despite some nearby mortar fire, while elements of a bigger hospital were bought in and a 200-bed hospital was eventually built and staff moved over and supplemented.

The hospital took over 3500 casualties through the front door of which more than 350 were major trauma cases and the hospital took around 70 paediatric trauma cases. Injuries included blunt trauma, gunshot wounds, shrapnel injuries and severe burns.It was also the location of the BFBS Radio studios for the duration of the operation.

== Current use ==
The base is currently used by the Iraqi military as a small base.

== See also ==
- Operation Telic order of battle
- List of United Kingdom Military installations used during Operation Telic
- List of United States Military installations in Iraq
