= RAF Peristerona =

Former military airport in Peristerona, Cyprus

RAF Peristerona
- Peristerona, Nicosia in Cyprus

Site information
- Owner: Air Ministry
- Operator: Royal Air Force
- Condition: Demolished

Location
- Shown within Cyprus RAF Peristerona (Europe) RAF Peristerona (Middle East)
- Coordinates: 35°07′41″N 033°04′30″E

Site history
- Built: 1941
- In use: 1941 — 1946
- Battles/wars: Mediterranean and Middle East Theatre

Airfield information
Runways
| Direction | Length and surface |
|---|---|
| 00/00 |

RAF Peristerona is a former Royal Air Force station located in Peristerona, Cyprus. It was established in 1941 during the Second World War, supporting Royal Air Force operations over the Axis-controlled Dodecanese Islands.

== History ==
During the Second World War in 1941, an airfield was established at Peristerona as part of a defensive effort led by garrisoned troops from Australia, India, and Britain. RAF Peristerona was among seven others, including Nicosia, Larnaca, Lakatamia, Limassol, Paphos, Salamis, and Tymbou. During 12 and 13 October 1943, a party of the No. 74 Squadron RAF and its Spirfires arrived at RAF Peristerona, travelling by two trucks. The squadron arrived in time for a party held in the newly built Officers' Mess, and personnel were accommodated within stone huts and tents. A rainstorm arrived over the airfield on the 19th, soaking tents, bedding, and clothes. The rainstorm grew heavy by the next day, and arrangements were made to relocate to No. 4 Nicosia main camp on the 22nd.

=== Closure ===
In 1946, RAF Peristerona was considered surplus to the needs of the RAF and was abandoned. Afterwards, ownership of the land was returned to its original owners and the airfield was reverted to farmland. The airfield disappeared after the 1950s, having largely been ploughed up. Today, no traces evidently remain.

== Units ==
The following units that were based at RAF Peristerona:

- No. 74 Squadron RAF between 11 October and 22 October 1943, equipped with Spitfire VC and later re-equipped with Spitfire IX

== Accidents and incidents ==
- During a solo training exercise on 12 June 1945, Flying Officer Pivott flying solo on a Beaufighter NE 479 crashed at 7:40 AM when his aircraft spun uncontrollably. The Beaufighter crashed on the southeast corner of the airfield, killing Flying Officer Pivott.
