= No. 459 Squadron RAAF =

Royal Australian Air Force squadron

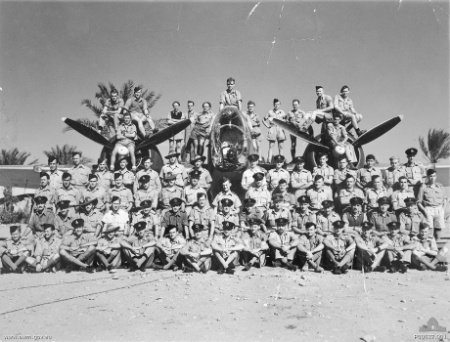
- Members of 459 Squadron RAAF with one of the squadron's Martin Baltimore aircraft in the Western Desert of Libya, 1944
- Active: 10 February 1942 – 10 April 1945
- Disbanded: 10 April 1945
- Country: Australia
- Allegiance: United Kingdom
- Branch: Royal Australian Air Force
- Role: Maritime patrol Bomber
- Part of: No. 21 Group, RAF Middle East Command
- Motto: Death to the invaders
- Battle honours: South-East Europe, 1942–1945; Egypt and Libya, 1940–1943; El Alamein; Mediterranean, 1940–1943

Insignia
- Squadron badge heraldry: A Scorpion (unofficial)
- Squadron codes: GK (1942–1943); BP (1943–1945?)

Aircraft flown
- Bomber: Lockheed Ventura; Martin Baltimore
- Patrol: Lockheed Hudson; Bristol Blenheim

No. 459 Squadron RAAF was a Royal Australian Air Force squadron that operated during World War II. It was formed in early 1942 and served as a maritime patrol and bomber unit in the Mediterranean theatre until early 1945, operating mainly Lockheed Hudson aircraft. In early 1945, the squadron was transferred to the United Kingdom with the intention of being transferred to RAF Coastal Command and converting to Vickers Wellington bombers; however, due to a series of delays the conversion was not completed and the squadron was disbanded in April 1945.

== History ==
Raised as an Article XV squadron under the terms of the Empire Air Training Scheme, No. 459 Squadron was established at Burg-el-Arab, Egypt, on 10 February 1942 and allocated to the Royal Australian Air Force. Under the temporary command of Squadron Leader Phillip Howson, the squadron was assigned to No. 201 Group RAF, which formed part of Middle East Command, and was tasked with performing the maritime reconnaissance role. Although the squadron initially possessed only six aircraft – two Lockheed Hudsons and four Bristol Blenheims – its first operations came four days after it was formed, when two Hudsons conducted a reconnaissance mission during which an unsuccessful attack was made on a German or Italian submarine. In April, Wing Commander Keith Hennock assumed command of the unit and the following month the squadron had received its full complement of Hudsons and had ceased operating the Blenheims, which had been on loan from No. 203 Squadron RAF.

Throughout the remainder of 1942 and into early 1943, the squadron operated against German shipping in the Mediterranean, focusing mainly upon interdicting German sea lines of communication that were being used to resupply forces in North Africa. Throughout June, July and August, the Hudsons destroyed a large number of German landing craft. German losses were so heavy that the vessels were withdrawn from the area, although the Australian squadron had suffered heavy losses in achieving this. The squadron's headquarters moved several times, with several moves between bases in Egypt, before the squadron was moved to Libya, taking up station at Gambut airfield in December 1942, where it would remain until April 1944. Additionally, detachments of the squadron were also to various places in Aden, Cyprus and Palestine, from where further missions were launched, including one that resulted in the sinking of a destroyer in September 1942. The squadron's first success over a U-boat came in June 1943, when German submarine U-97 was sunk by a No. 459 Squadron Hudson.

In September 1943, the squadron was re-roled temporally as a level bomber unit, widening its field of operations to Crete and mainland Greece, launching several day and night operations. The squadron was equipped with Lockheed Venturas in February – March 1944, and although several operations were undertaken around the Greek Islands, the type was not considered successful and in July 1944, No. 459 Squadron was re-equipped with Martin Baltimore aircraft. Prior to the conversion, the squadron had moved its headquarters to Palestine in April 1944; it remained there until August 1944, when No. 459 was transferred back to Berka, in Libya.

No. 459 Squadron continued operating around the Greek Islands until late February 1945, when it was posted to the United Kingdom as part of a plan to transfer the squadron to Coastal Command and convert to Vickers Wellingtons. After transiting through Egypt, the move was completed by ship, and at the same time, many of the squadron's experienced aircrew were either transferred to other squadrons, or were repatriated back to Australia for rest or demobilisation. In the United Kingdom, the squadron established itself at RAF Chivenor, in Devon, but shortly after its arrival, as a result of the earlier delays, on 10 April 1945 the squadron was disbanded, having not flown its Wellingtons operationally. A total of 53 Australian personnel were killed during the war.

== Aircraft operated ==
No 459 Squadron operated the following aircraft:

From	To	Aircraft	Version
February 1942	May 1942	Bristol Blenheim	Mk.IV
March 1942	December 1942	Lockheed Hudson	Mk.III
July 1942	January 1944	Lockheed Hudson	Mk.IIIa
August 1943	April 1944	Lockheed Hudson	Mk.VI
September 1943	November 1943	Lockheed Hudson	Mk.V
December 1943	July 1944	Lockheed Ventura	Mk.V
July 1944	February 1945	Martin Baltimore	Mks.IV, V
March 1945	April 1945	Vickers Wellington	Mk.XIII

== Squadron bases ==
No. 459 Squadron operated from the following bases and airfields:

From	To	Station	Remark
10 February 1942	14 May 1942	LG.39/Burg-el-Arab, Egypt	Dets. at LG.05/Sidi Barrani, Egypt and RAF Gambut, Libya
14 May 1942	30 June 1942	LG.40/Bahig South, Egypt	
30 June 1942	10 September 1942	LG.208/LG 'Z', Mahsma, Egypt	Dets at LG.226/Gianaclis, Egypt; RAF St Jean, Palestine; RAF Khormaksar, Aden; Scuscuiban; RAF Socotra, Yemen; Gambut III, Libya; LG 227/Gianaclis Satellite, Egypt
28 November 1942	18 December 1942	LG.226/Gianaclis, Egypt	Dets at RAF Khormaksar, Aden; Scuscuiban; Socotra, Yemen; Gambut III, Libya; LG.227/Gianaclis Satellite, Egypt; Berka III, Libya
18 December 1942	5 April 1944	LG.143/Gambut III, Libya	Dets at RAF Khormaksar, Aden; Berka III, Libya; LG.227/Gianaclis Satellite, Egypt; RAF Nicosia, Cyprus; LG.91, Egypt; LG.07/'Z'LG/Matruh West, Egypt; RAF Lydda, Palestine; Gianaclis, Egypt; RAF El Adem, Libya; RAF St Jean, Palestine and RAF Ramat David, Palestine
5 April 1944	15 May 1944	RAF Ramat David, Palestine	
15 May 1944	9 August 1944	RAF St Jean, Palestine	
9 August 1944	17 February 1945	Berka III, Libya	Det. at Mersa Matruh, Egypt
17 February 1945	25 February 1945	RAF Almaza (No 22 PTC), Egypt	
25 February 1945	14 March 1945	en route to the UK	
14 March 1945	10 April 1945	RAF Chivenor, Devon	Disbanded before becoming operational

== Commanding officers ==
No. 459 Squadron was commanded by the following officers:

From	To	Name
10 February 1942	19 April 1942	Squadron Leader P.W. Howson (acting)
19 April 1942	15 September 1942	Wing Commander K.S. Hennock
15 September 1942	4 October 1943	Wing Commander P.W. Howson
5 October 1943	9 November 1944	Wing Commander A.D. Henderson
9 November 1944	10 April 1945	Wing Commander C.E. Payne

== Notes ==
=== Bibliography ===
- Bowyer, Michael J.F.; Rawlings, John D.R. (1979). Squadron Codes, 1937–56. Cambridge, UK: Patrick Stephens. ISBN 0-85059-364-6.
- Delve, Ken (1994). The Source Book of the RAF. Shrewsbury, Shropshire, UK: Airlife Publishing. ISBN 1-85310-451-5.
- Eather, Steve (1995). Flying Squadrons of the Australian Defence Force. Weston Creek, Australian Capital Territory: Aerospace Publications. ISBN 1-875671-15-3.
- Flintham, Vic; Thomas, Andrew (2003). Combat Codes: A Full Explanation and Listing of British, Commonwealth and Allied Air Force Unit Codes Since 1938. Shrewsbury, Shropshire, UK: Airlife Publishing. ISBN 1-84037-281-8.
- Halley, James J. (1988). The Squadrons of the Royal Air Force & Commonwealth, 1918–1988. Tonbridge, Kent, UK: Air-Britain (Historians). ISBN 0-85130-164-9.
- Jefford, C.G. (2001) [1988]. RAF Squadrons: A Comprehensive Record of the Movement and Equipment of all RAF Squadrons and Their Antecedents Since 1912 (2nd ed.). Shropshire, UK: Airlife Publishing. ISBN 1-85310-053-6.
- Rawlings, John D.R. (1982). Coastal, Support and Special Squadrons of the RAF and Their Aircraft. London: Jane's Publishing Company. ISBN 0-7106-0187-5.
