= No. 680 Squadron RAF =

- Active: 1 February 1943 – 1 September 1946
- Country: United Kingdom
- Branch: Royal Air Force
- Role: Photo-reconnaissance
- Part of: No. 206 Group RAF, Middle East Command; AHQ Egypt, Middle East Command

Insignia
- Squadron Badge heraldry: No badge known to have been authorised
- Squadron Markings: No code(s) are known to have been carried by this squadron Towards the end of the war Mosquitoes of 680 squadron carried red/white diagonal stripes on their rudders

No. 680 Squadron RAF was a photo-reconnaissance squadron of the Royal Air Force, active during the Second World War.

== History ==
No. 680 Squadron RAF was formed in February 1943 from 'A' Flight of No. 2 Photographic Reconnaissance Unit RAF (PRU), equipped with a variety of aircraft including Supermarine Spitfires, Hawker Hurricanes, Bristol Beaufighters and Lockheed Electras. It continued in the photographic reconnaissance role, operating in North Africa and the Mediterranean. In early 1944, the unit converted to Martin Baltimores and de Havilland Mosquitoes, deploying to Sicily and Sardinia later in the year. After the end of the war, 680 Squadron flew surveying missions in the Middle East, before being disbanded by renumbering it to No. 13 Squadron RAF on 1 September 1946.

== Noted squadron members ==
A well-known Australian actor, Charles "Bud" Tingwell, piloted Spitfires and Mosquitoes with the squadron.

== Aircraft operated ==
Aircraft operated by no. 680 Squadron
From	To	Aircraft	Variant
February 1943	February 1944	Hawker Hurricane	Mk.I
February 1943	March 1943	Bristol Beaufighter	Mk.Ic
February 1943	June 1944	Supermarine Spitfire	PR.Mks.IV, V
February 1943	September 1944	Lockheed Electra	
February 1943	January 1945	Supermarine Spitfire	PR.Mk.IX
March 1943	June 1943	Supermarine Spitfire	PR.Mk.VI
March 1943	December 1944	Hawker Hurricane	PR.Mk.IIb
August 1943	July 1946	Supermarine Spitfire	PR.XI
February 1944	May 1944	Martin Baltimore	Mks.IIIa, V
February 1944	July 1944	Bristol Blenheim	Mk.IV
February 1944	September 1946	de Havilland Mosquito	Mks.IX & XVI
March 1946	September 1946	de Havilland Mosquito	PR.34

== Squadron bases ==
Bases and airfields used by no. 680 Squadron RAF, data from
From	To	Base	Remark
1 February 1943	25 February 1945	LG.219 Kilo 8/Matariyah/Payne Field, Egypt	Dets. at RAF El Djem, RAF Monastir, RAF Castel Benito, RAF Senem, RAF Derna, RAF Tocra, RAF Lakatamia, RAF Nicosia, RAF San Severo & RAF Hassani
25 February 1945	9 July 1946	RAF Deversoir, Egypt	Dets. at RAF Habbaniya, RAF Aqir, RAF Meherabad, RAF Hassani, RAF Sharjah & RAF Shaibah
9 July 1946	1 September 1946	RAF Ein Shemer, Palestine	

== Commanding officers ==
Officers commanding no. 680 squadron RAF, data from
From	To	Name
February 1943	October 1944	W/Cdr. J.R. Whelan, DFC & Bar
October 1944	September 1946	W/Cdr. J.C. Paish
