= No. 13 Squadron RAF =

Flying squadron of the Royal Air Force

No. XIII Squadron RAF
- Squadron badge
- Active: 1915–1918 (RFC); 1918–1919; 1924–1946; 1946–1982; 1990–2011; 2012–present
- Country: United Kingdom
- Branch: Royal Air Force
- Type: Remotely Piloted Air System squadron
- Role: Intelligence, surveillance, target acquisition, and reconnaissance (ISTAR) and attack
- Part of: ISTAR Force
- Station: RAF Waddington
- Nickname: 'The Stabbed Cats'
- Mottos: Adjuvamus tuendo (Latin for 'We assist by watching')
- Aircraft: General Atomics Reaper RG1

Insignia
- Roundel
- Tail codes: AN (1939); OO (1939-1942)

Number 13 Squadron, also known as XIII Squadron, is a squadron of the Royal Air Force which operated the General Atomics MQ-9A Reaper unmanned aerial vehicle at RAF Waddington from 26 October 2012 until September 2025 when the type was withdrawn from RAF service. Reaper is being replaced by the Protector UAV.

The unit first formed as part of the Royal Flying Corps on 10 January 1915 and went on to fly the Martinsyde G.100, the Royal Aircraft Factory F.E.2, the SPAD VII and SPAD XIII, and the Sopwith Dolphin during the First World War. During the Second World War it began operating the Westland Lysander in the army cooperation role. From late 1942 it operated the Bristol Blenheim in North Africa. It converted to the Lockheed Ventura in 1943 for coastal patrols and convoy escort duties. Post-war it operated de Havilland Mosquito before transitioning to the jet powered Gloster Meteor and English Electric Canberra for photo reconnaissance. From 1 January 1990, it operated the Panavia Tornado, initially the GR1A variant based at RAF Honington and later the GR4/4A at RAF Marham until 13 May 2011 when the squadron disbanded.

== History ==
=== First World War and Interwar period (1915–1938) ===
No. 13 Squadron of the Royal Flying Corps (RFC) was formed at Fort Grange, RAF Gosport, Hampshire, on 10 January 1915 and moved to France and the Western Front on 19 October 1915, initially on army co-operation duties and subsequently on bombing raids, pioneering formation bombing. Aircraft types operated during the war included the Martinsyde G.100, the Royal Aircraft Factory F.E.2, the Royal Aircraft Factory R.E.8, the SPAD VII and SPAD XIII, and the Sopwith Dolphin fighter. The squadron disbanded on 31 December 1919.

The unit had reformed at RAF Kenley on 1 April 1924 and inter-war years saw the squadron operate from various UK bases equipped with a variety of aircraft types including the Bristol F.2 Fighter, Armstrong Whitworth Atlas, Hawker Audax and Hawker Hector for army cooperation.

=== Second World War (1939–1945) ===
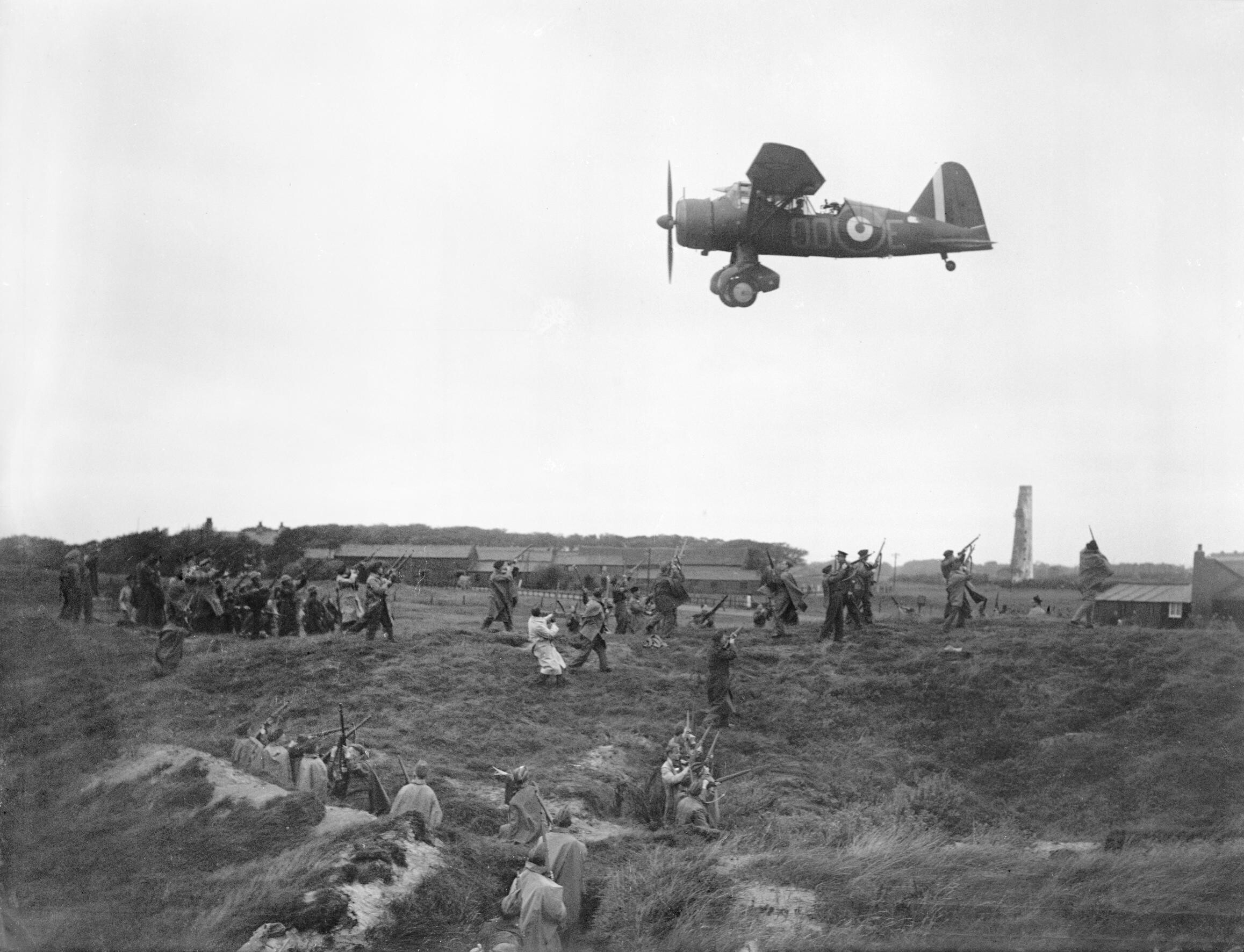
A Westland Lysander of No. 13 Squadron provides aiming practice for members of the Home Guard at the Western Command Weapons Training School, Altcar, Lancashire, September 1940.

By January 1939, No. 13 squadron was equipped with Westland Lysanders. It moved to France on 2 October until late May 1940 when it withdrew to UK bases following the Fall of France.

In May 1941, the squadron changed role and theatre, flying a variety of bomber aircraft including the Bristol Blenheim and Douglas Boston light bombers in the Mediterranean until the end of the war, disbanding on 19 April 1946.

=== Cold War (1946–1982) ===
The squadron reformed as No. 13 (Photographic Reconnaissance) Squadron on 1 September 1946 at RAF Ein Shemer, Palestine, when No. 680 Squadron was renumbered. Peace heralded the return to reconnaissance duties, with the unit flying the de Havilland Mosquito PR.34. Moving to Egypt, the squadron converted to the Gloster Meteor PR.10 in 1952 and by 1956 was operating the English Electric Canberra PR.7.

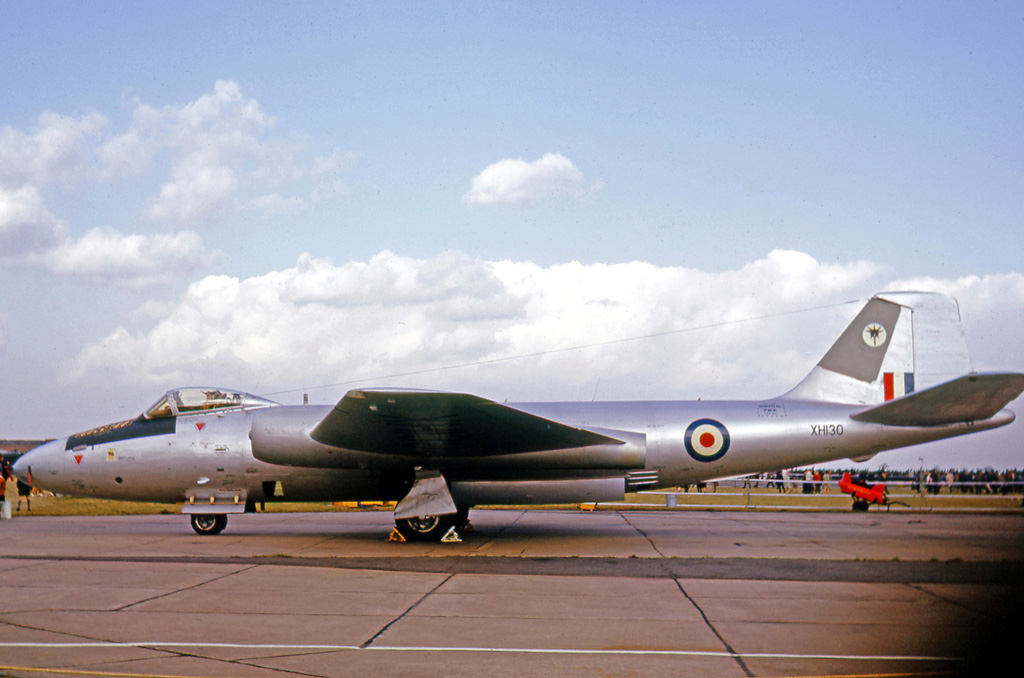
A Canberra PR.9 of No. 13 (Photographic Reconnaissance) Squadron in 1964

During the 1956 Suez Crisis, the squadron flew reconnaissance flights over Syria from Cyprus, which resulted in one Canberra being shot down by the Syrian Air Force.

In 1978, the squadron moved to RAF Wyton near Huntingdon in the UK, flying Canberra PR.7 and PR.9, built by Short Brothers, until the unit disbanded on 1 January 1982.

=== Panavia Tornado (1990–2011) ===
==== RAF Honington & Gulf War (1990–1994) ====
The squadron reformed at RAF Honington on 1 January 1990, equipped with Panavia Tornado GR1A in the reconnaissance role. The Tornado was equipped with the new Tornado Infrared Reconnaissance System (TIRRS).

During the deployment of allied forces to the Persian Gulf for Operation Desert Shield in the latter part of 1990, it quickly became apparent that the unique night reconnaissance capability of the Tornado GR1A could provide vital intelligence to the Allied commanders. As a result, on 15 and 16 January 1991, immediately before hostilities commenced, six aircraft were deployed to Saudi Arabia. During the first nights of the war, the Reconnaissance Wing successfully discovered several of the elusive Iraqi Scud missile sites.

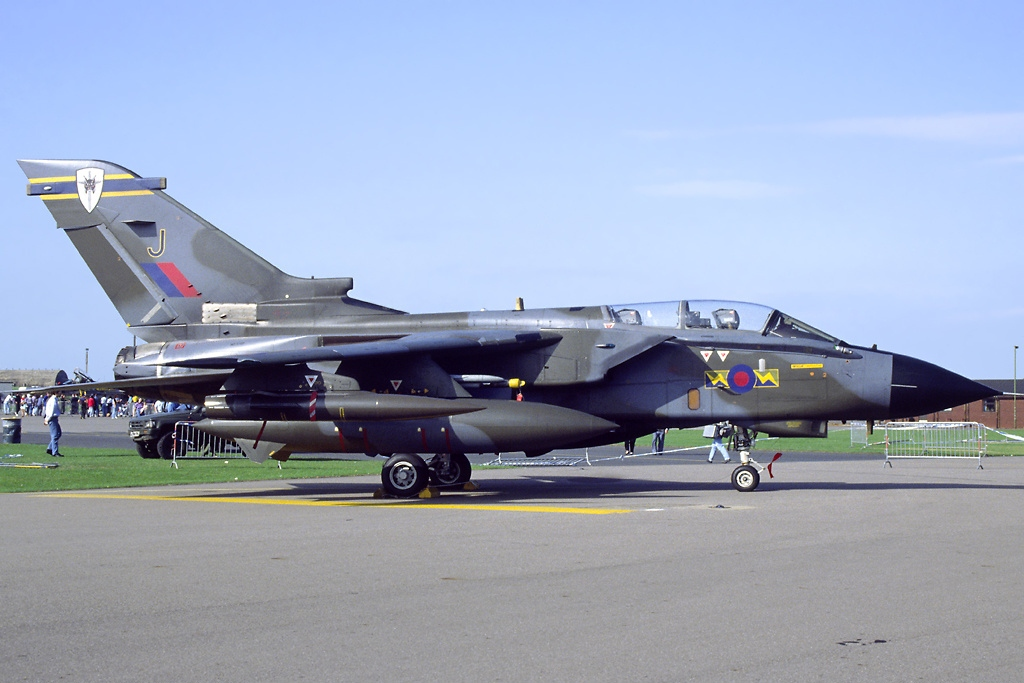
A Panavia Tornado GR1A wearing No.13 Squadron markings in 1992

The majority of sorties were however, tasked into central and eastern Iraq to identify the disposition of the various Iraqi ground forces in preparation for the ground offensive. Although the rest of the Coalition Air Forces moved to medium level operations after the first few nights of the air war, the GR1A operated at night and at low-level for the duration of the conflict. The squadron was also fundamental to the success of the Tornado/TIALD (Thermal Imaging And Laser Designation) combination. Four No. 13 Squadron crews began the work-up from mid-January and, after encouraging results, four aircraft flew to Tabuk in Saudi Arabia.

After the war, the squadron continued its peacetime training role at RAF Honington as well as taking part in Operation Jural, the monitoring of a No-Fly Zone in the South of Iraq below the 32nd parallel north.

==== RAF Marham (1994–2011) ====
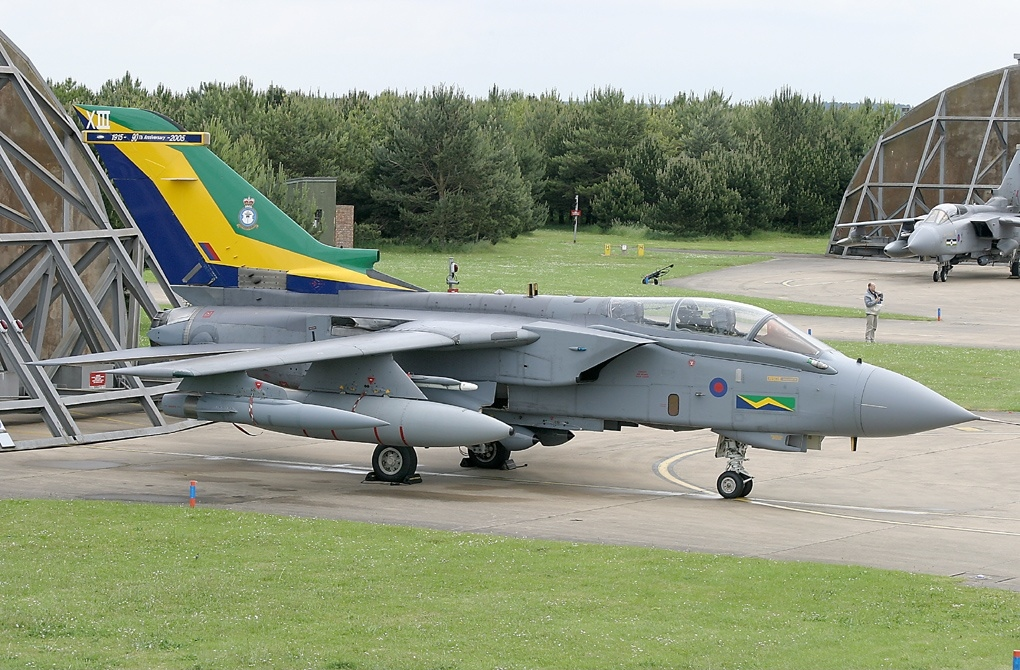
A Panavia Tornado GR4A in special markings to celebrate the 90th anniversary of No. 13 Squadron in 2005

On 1 February 1994, No. 13 Squadron moved to RAF Marham.

Deployments to operational theatres have continued to be a major feature of the squadron's life having deployed on Operation Warden and Operation Bolton to monitor both the Northern and Southern No-Fly Zones in Iraq. XIII Squadron crews joined the Ali Al Salem Combat Air Wing (Composite RAF Squadron formed from the Tornado GR4 Force for Gulf War 2) in early 2003 and flew Scud Hunting missions in the Western Desert of Iraq during the Iraq War of 2003. The squadron also flew the last sortie by a Tornado in support of Operation Telic in 2009.

In the summer of 2010, the squadron flew close air support missions in Afghanistan as part of Operation Herrick, and in 2011 the squadron fired Storm Shadow cruise missiles against Libya in the early days of Operation Ellamy. A few weeks later, on 13 May 2011, the squadron was disbanded as part of the Strategic Defence and Security Review of 2010.

=== MQ-9 Reaper (2012–2025) ===
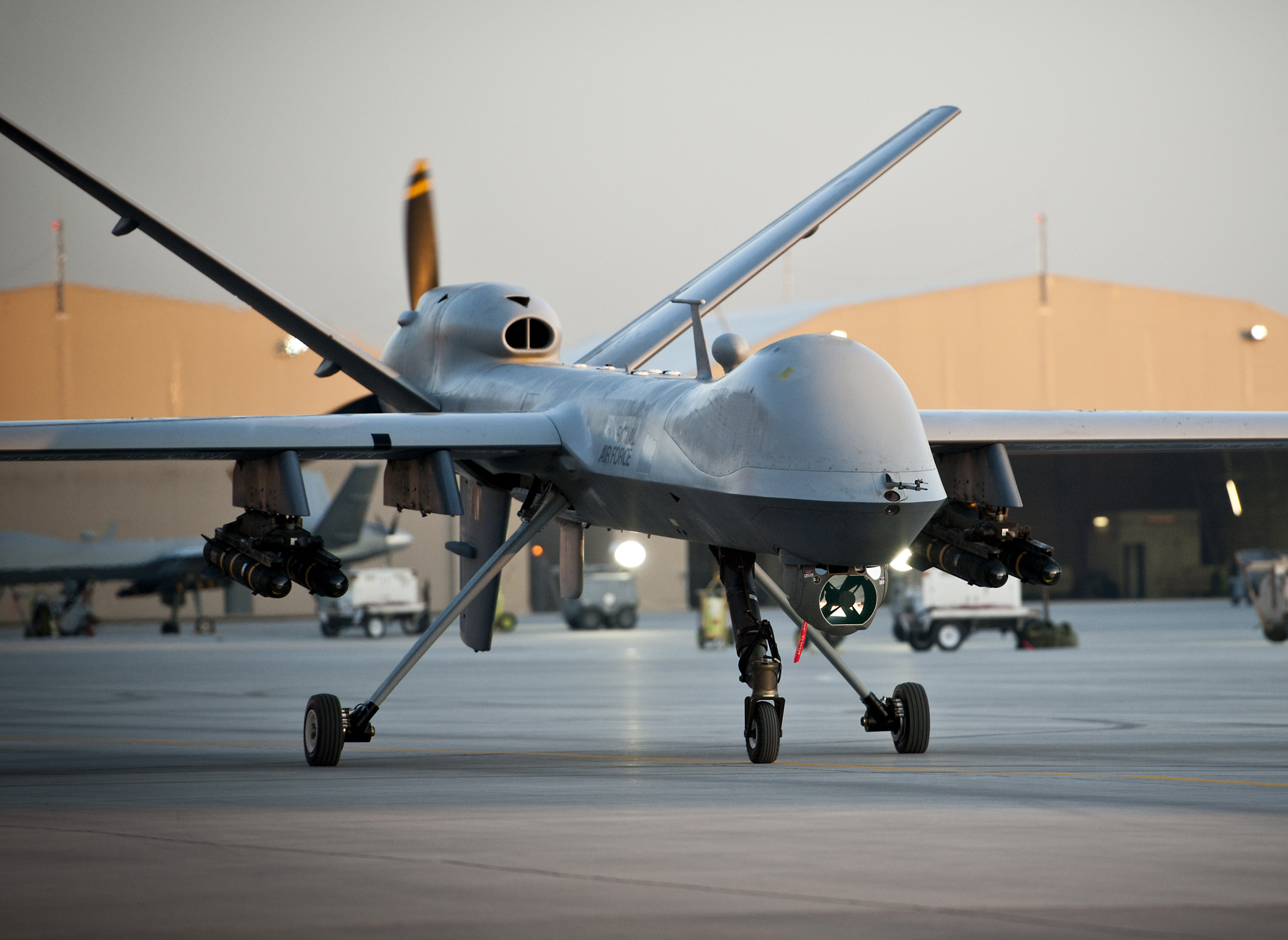
An RAF General Atomics MQ-9A Reaper of the type operated by No. 13 Squadron

At the disbandment parade of No. 13 (Tornado) Squadron in May 2011, the Chief of the Air Staff announced the formation of a second unit operating the MQ-9 Reaper remotely piloted aircraft system which would receive the No. 13 Squadron numberplate. No. 13 (Reaper) Squadron was reformed on 26 October 2012 at RAF Waddington. Subsequently, the squadron flew the first remote operational mission from the UK towards the end of April 2013 and conducted its first remote weapons strike a few days later.

It was announced in 2021, that the squadron would re-equip with General Atomics Protector RG1 to become the second RAF Reaper squadron after No. 31 Squadron. In 2025, Reaper was withdrawn from RAF service and replaced by Protector.

== Aircraft operated ==
List of aircraft operated by No. 13 Squadron:

- Royal Aircraft Factory B.E.2c, d and e (1915–1917)
- Royal Aircraft Factory R.E.8 (1917–1919)
- Bristol F.2B Fighter (1924–1928)
- Armstrong Whitworth Atlas (1927–1932)
- Hawker Audax (1932–1937)
- Hawker Hector (1937–1939)
- Westland Lysander Mk.I, Mk.II and Mk.III (1939–1941)
- Bristol Blenheim Mk.IV and Mk.V (1941–1943)
- Lockheed Ventura (1943–1943)
- Martin Baltimore B.IV and B.V] (1944–1944)
- Douglas Boston Mk.IV and Mk.V (1944–1946)
- de Havilland Mosquito PR.34 (1946–1952)
- Gloster Meteor PR.10 (1952–1956)
- English Electric Canberra PR.7 and PR.9 (1956–1982)
- Panavia Tornado GR1A and GR4A (1990–2011)
- General Atomics MQ-9A Reaper (2012–present)

== Heritage ==
The squadron's heraldic badge features the head of a lynx wildcat, coloured black and positioned on front of a dagger. The lynx’s head represents vigilance and the dagger is an emblem which as long been used by the squadron.

The squadron's motto is Adjuvamus tuendo (Latin for 'We assist by watching').

== Battle honours ==
No. 13 Squadron has received the following battle honours. Those marked with an asterisk (*) may be emblazoned on the squadron standard.

- Western Front (1915–1918)*
- Somme (1916)
- Arras (1917)*
- Cambrai (1917)*
- Somme (1918)*
- Hindenburg Line (1918)*
- France and Low Countries (1939–1940)
- Dieppe (1942)*
- North Africa (1942–1943)
- Mediterranean (1943)
- Italy (1944–1945)*
- Gustav Line*
- Gothic Line*
- Gulf (1991)*
- Iraq (2003–2011)

== See also ==
- List of Royal Air Force aircraft squadrons
