= Peristerona =

Village in Nicosia District, Cyprus

Peristerona: Περιστερώνα (Greek); Peristerona (Turkish)
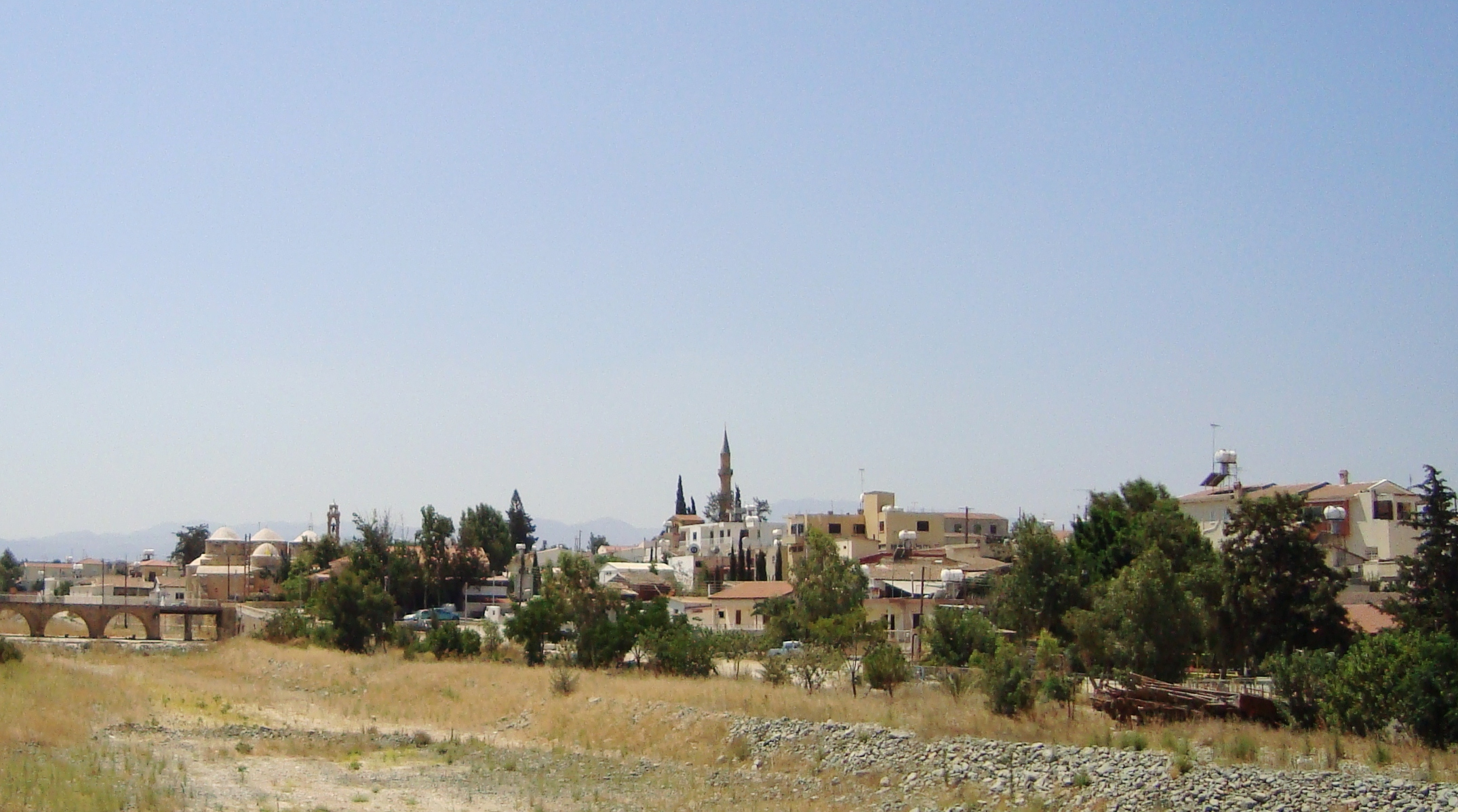
- View of Peristerona village

- Location in Cyprus
- Coordinates: 35°7′44″N 33°4′45″E
- Country: Cyprus
- District: Nicosia District
- Elevation: 1,339 ft (408 m)

Population (2001)
  - Total: 2,173
- Time zone: UTC+2 (EET)
  - Summer (DST): UTC+3 (EEST)

Peristerona (Greek: Περιστερώνα; Turkish: Peristerona) is a large village about 32 kilometres west of the capital Nicosia, on the foothills of the Troodos Mountain range in the Morphou basin. It is built on the west bank of the river that bears the same name, which is a tributary of the river Serrachis, at an average altitude of 250 meters.

The population by the 2001 census was 2,173. It is primarily an agricultural village producing citrus-fruit vegetables, cereals olives and almonds. The name Peristerona derives from the Greek word for dove or pigeon (peristeri).

Peristerona has historically always been a mixed village. The 1831 Ottoman census recorded a slight Turkish Cypriot majority at 56%, but all later censuses recorded a slight Greek Cypriot majority. In 1941, Peristerona's first airfield was established from farmland. It was used to support the Royal Air Force's operations over the Mediterranean and Middle East theatre of World War II. After the war, it was reverted back to farmland leaving no traces. In 1960, the village's population was 1166, with 690 Greek Cypriots (59.2%) and 476 Turkish Cypriots (41.8%). In 1964, during the period of intercommunal violence after the Bloody Christmas of 1963, the whole of the village's Turkish Cypriot population fled to Turkish Cypriot enclaves in Lefka, Angolemi, Kazivera and Elia. In 1968, some Turkish Cypriots returned to the village though their numbers were extremely small, only 23 were reported in 1971. Following the killing of two Turkish Cypriots by Greek Cypriot militants in 1974 after the Turkish invasion of Cyprus, the returned Turkish Cypriots also left for Northern Cyprus. There, Turkish Cypriots of Peristerona were resettled all over the territory but were mainly concentrated in Katokopia. Peristerona was used to resettle Greek Cypriot refugees, mainly from Morphou and surroundings. Turkish Cypriot houses were mostly used to house these people and a modern housing development was constructed between 1975 and 1982, housing 500 people in 1982.

The church, St. Barnabas and Hilarion Church, has five domes on the roof arranged in the shape of a cross, a feature only seen on one other church in the island. It was built in the Byzantine period. The Peristerona Mosque was constructed in the 19th century, during the Ottoman era. It has tinted windows and sculptured parts. It is next to the church and the two were used in stamps in the British period as a symbol of Greek-Turkish coexistence.

Of note is that there are two further villages with the same name in Cyprus one in the district of Paphos and one in Famagusta.

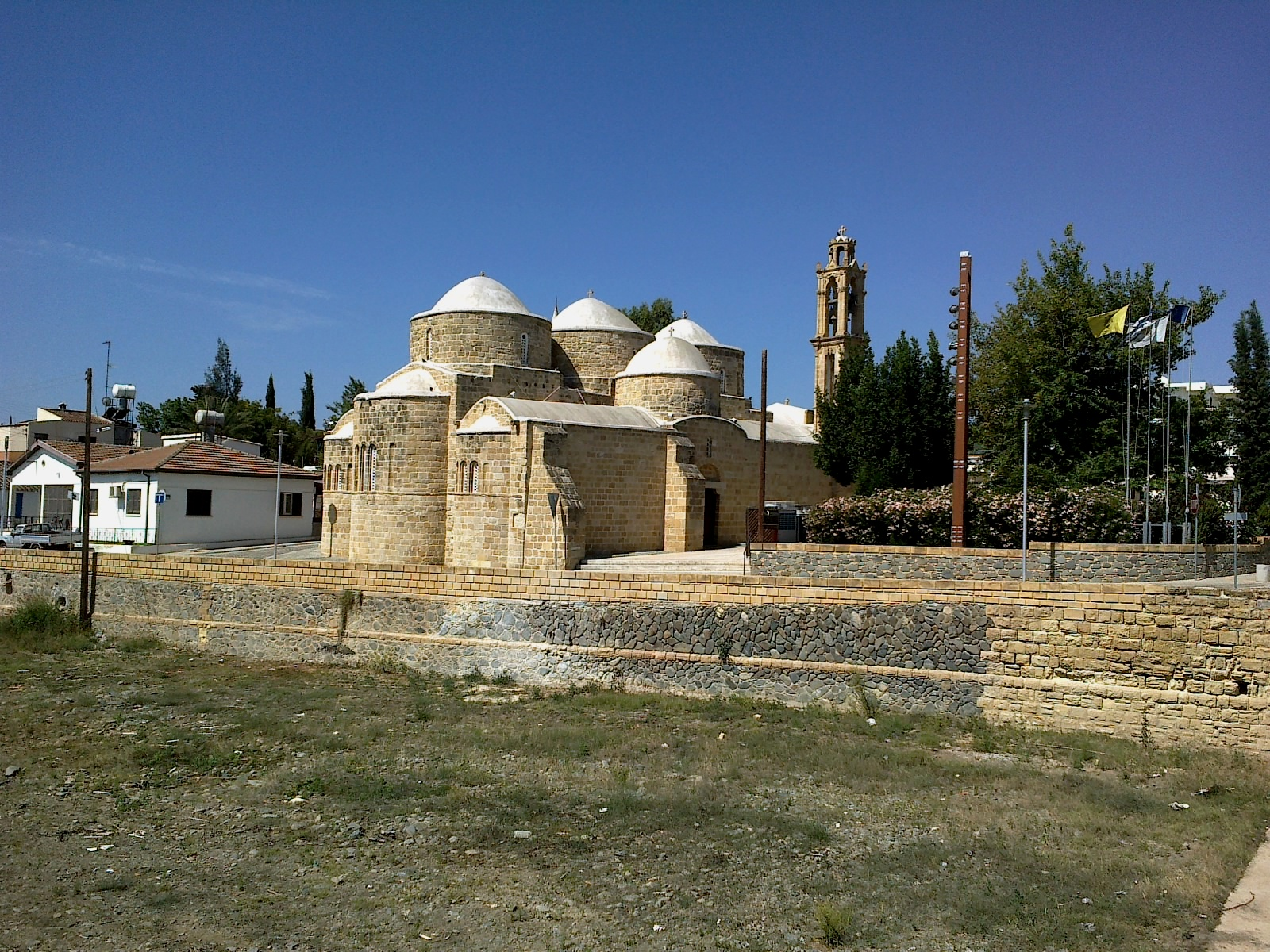

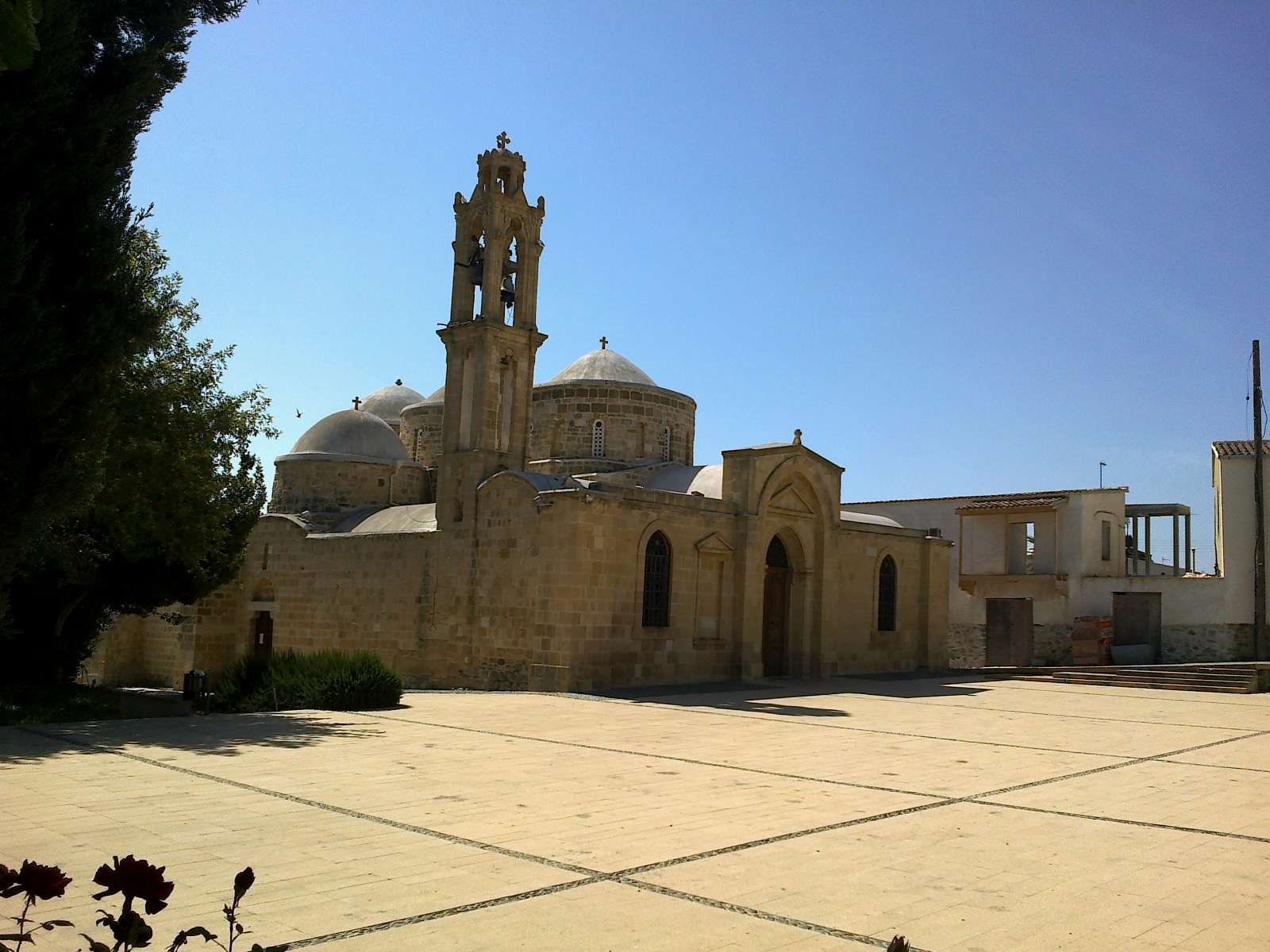

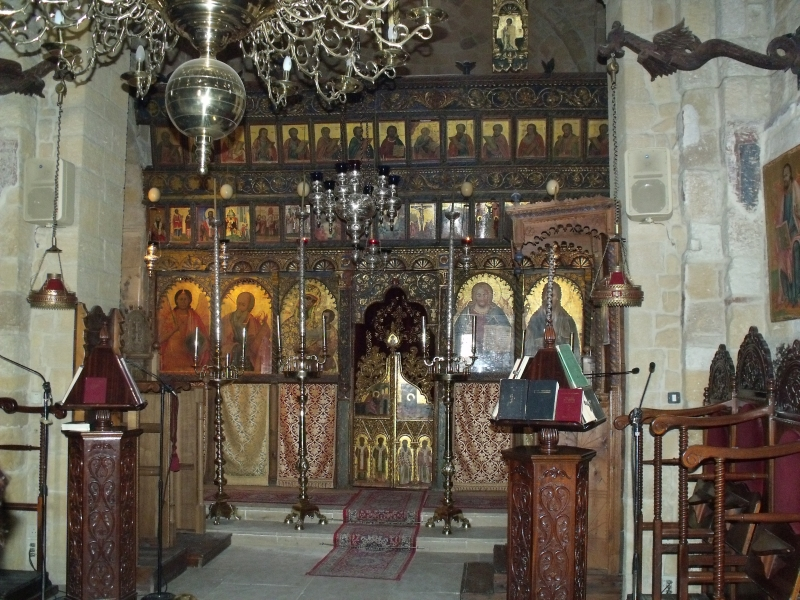
