= RAF Paphos =

Former military airport in Peristerona, Cyprus

RAF Paphos
- Αεροδρόμιο Γεροσκήπου
- Geroskipou, Paphos in Cyprus

Site information
- Owner: Air Ministry
- Operator: Royal Air Force
- Condition: Demolished

Location
- Shown within Cyprus RAF Paphos (Europe) RAF Paphos (Middle East)
- Coordinates: 34°45′13″N 32°26′15″E

Site history
- Built: 1941
- In use: 1941 — 1946
- Battles/wars: Mediterranean and Middle East Theatre

Airfield information
Runways
Direction	Length and surface
00/00

RAF Paphos also known as Geroskipou Airfield, is a former Royal Air Force station located near Geroskipou, Paphos in Cyprus. It was established in 1941 during the Second World War, supporting Royal Air Force operations over the Axis-controlled Dodecanese Islands.

== History ==
During the Second World War in 1941, an airfield was established at Geroskipou as part of a defensive effort led by garrisoned troops from Australia, India, and Britain. RAF Paphos was among seven others, including Nicosia, Larnaca, Lakatamia, Limassol, Peristerona, Salamis, and Tymbou. The airfield featured three runways, a perimeter taxiway, and eight underground aircraft pens. Northwest of the perimeter was a camp housing stationed personnel.

=== Closure ===
RAF Paphos was abandoned in 1946 as it was surplus to post-war needs of the RAF. Afterwards, land ownership was returned to its original owners and the airfield was reverted to farmland. The runway was used as a large threshing hold for farmers, as it allowed a large hard surface for spreading and processing crops. In 1956, a runway was reconstructed for use by civilian aircraft, which remained in use until the 1970s. By then, the airfield had disappeared having largely been ploughed. Today, some traces remain.

== Units ==
The following units that were based at RAF Paphos:

- No. 272 Squadron RAF detachment between 14 March 1942 and 6 November 1942, equipped with Beaufighter IC
- No. 603 (City of Edinburgh) Squadron AAF detachment between 28 June 1942 and 21 December 1942, equipped with Spitfire VC
- No. 252 Squadron RAF detachment between September 1942 and 18 January 1943, equipped with Beaufighter VIC
- No. 127 Squadron RAF detachment between 13 March 1943 and 1 April 1943, equipped with Spitfire VC
- No. 213 (Ceylon) Squadron RAF detachment between 6 July 1943 and 25 February 1944, equipped with Hurricane IIC
- No. 274 Squadron RAF detachments between 9 August 1943 and 22 February 1944, equipped with Spitfire VC
- No. 237 (Rhodesia) Squadron RAF detachment between 12 September 1943 and 9 December 1943, equipped with Hurricane IIC
