= No. 454 Squadron RAAF =

Unit of the Royal Australian Air Force that served during World War II

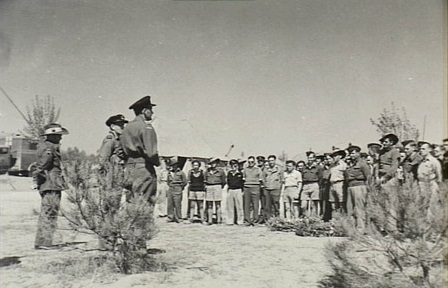
- Members of No. 454 Squadron RAAF celebrate Anzac Day in Cesenatico, Italy
- Active: 23 May 1941 – 11 July 1941; 2 April 1942 – 20 August 1945
- Country: Australia
- Allegiance: United Kingdom
- Branch: Royal Australian Air Force
- Role: Bomber Squadron
- Part of: No. 201 Group RAF, Middle East Command; Desert Air Force
- Battle honours: South-East Europe, 1942–1945; Mediterranean, 1940–1943; Italy, 1943–1945; Gustav Line; Gothic Line

Aircraft flown
- Bomber: Bristol Blenheim; Martin Baltimore

No. 454 Squadron was a unit of the Royal Australian Air Force (RAAF) that served during the Second World War. The squadron was raised in Australia under the Empire Air Training Scheme in mid-1941 but was disbanded shortly afterwards. It was re-formed later in 1941 from mainly British personnel and subsequently took part in the fighting in the Mediterranean and Middle East theatre before being disbanded in August 1945.

== History ==
=== Formation ===
Raised under the Article XV provisions of the Empire Air Training Scheme, 454 Squadron came into existence at Williamtown in New South Wales on 23 May 1941. The squadron was intended for service in Europe with the Royal Air Force but it disbanded shortly afterwards on 11 July, and its personnel posted to various other squadrons including 456, 457 and 458 squadrons.

=== Middle East ===
On 2 April 1942, 454 Squadron was re-raised at Blackpool in the United Kingdom in a reconnaissance/light-bomber role, from RAF personnel. Two months later, the squadron was transferred to Egypt, where the ground crews were sent to RAF Aqir to service aircraft from other squadrons; they moved to the Suez shortly after this. In late September, the squadron received aircrew and concentrated at Aqir again. It proceeded to Iraq where it was equipped with Bristol Blenheims. During this time the squadron was based at Qaiyara, and was employed in a training role, providing Blenheim refresher training for crews from other RAF squadrons. In October, Wing Commander Ian Campbell took command.

Early in 1943, the squadron moved to Gianaclis, near Alexandria, where it was re-equipped with Martin Baltimores. In February, it became part of 201 Group, RAF Middle East Command based at LG.91 RAF El Amiriya in Egypt, and became a maritime patrol squadron. Operating in the Mediterranean Theatre for a period of about a year and a half, 454 Squadron attacked targets in Greece and Crete, concentrating on anti-submarine patrols and striking merchant shipping, operating from bases including Amiriya, LG.143/Gambut III, RAF St Jean and Berka III.

While many of its personnel during this period came from countries other than Australia, from April 1944, the squadron's commanding officers were RAAF personnel, beginning with Wing Commander M. J. "Mike" Moore.

=== Italy ===
From July 1944, the squadron joined in the Italian campaign, moving to Pescara, where it was assigned to the Desert Air Force. The squadron became a day bomber unit, supporting the Eighth Army. The squadron moved airfields as the front advanced, and even attacked targets in Yugoslavia. According to the Australian War Memorial, 454 Squadron "earned a reputation for efficiency, despite Italy's climatic extremes", using techniques such as radar-controlled bombing. In November, Wing Commander A. D. "Pete" Henderson RAAF succeeded Moore as CO.

In early 1945, 454 became a night intruder squadron, attacking German forces as they withdrew north. The squadron's last sorties were flown on 1 May 1945, the day before the German forces in Italy surrendered. Following the conclusion of hostilities, 454 Squadron was disbanded on 14 August 1945, at Villaorba. During the war the squadron suffered 60 Australian fatalities. Its final commanding officer was Wing Commander John Rees DFC, DFC (US), RAAF.

== Aircraft operated ==
Aircraft operated by 454 Squadron RAAF, data from
From	To	Aircraft	Version
November 1942	January 1943	Bristol Blenheim	Mk.IV
February 1943	September 1943	Martin Baltimore	Mk.III
June 1943	December 1944	Martin Baltimore	Mk.IV
October 1943	August 1945	Martin Baltimore	Mk.V
March 1945	May 1945	Fairchild Argus	F24
May 1945	May 1945	Supermarine Spitfire	PR.IVT
May 1945	August 1945	Taylorcraft Auster	Mk.III

== Commanding officers ==
Officers commanding 454 Squadron RAAF, data from
From	To	Name
16 October 1942	4 October 1943	Wing Commander Ian Lindsay Campbell, RAAF
4 October 1943	1 April 1944	Wing Commander John Arthur Gordon Coates, CBE, DFC, MID, RAF
1 April 1944	25 November 1944	Wing Commander Milton 'Mike' Jeffery Moore, DFC, RAAF
25 November 1944	19 May 1945	Wing Commander Andrew Dill 'Pete' Henderson, OBE, MID, RAAF
19 May 1945	14 August 1945	Wing Commander John Gordon Rees, DFC, DFC(US), RAAF

== See also ==
- Article XV squadrons
