= RAF Nicosia =

Former Royal Air Force base in Cyprus

RAF Nicosia
- Nicosia, Nicosia District in Cyprus
- "In Quadrivio Paratus"

Site information
- Type: Military
- Owner: Ministry of Defence
- Operator: Royal Air Force
- Controlled by: RAF Middle East Air Force; RAF Near East Air Force

Location
- Shown within Cyprus RAF Nicosia (Europe)
- Coordinates: 35°9′1.9″N 33°16′49.2″E

Site history
- Built: 1930s
- In use: 1930s - 1966
- Battles/wars: Mediterranean and Middle East theatre of World War II; Cold War

Airfield information
- Identifiers: IATA: NIC, ICAO: LCNC
Runways
Direction	Length and surface
	Asphalt
	Asphalt

Royal Air Force Nicosia or more simply RAF Nicosia is a former Royal Air Force station on the island of Cyprus, built in the 1930s. The station served as Headquarters Royal Air Force Cyprus from 8 June to 29 July 1941.

The original principal airport for Cyprus, Nicosia International Airport, was built within the site of the RAF station. Both civil and military aviation on the island operated from the site, although the RAF disestablished the station in 1966.

The 1974 Turkish invasion of Cyprus led to the cessation of commercial operations from the airport, although the site is still owned by the British Ministry of Defence, but is controlled by the United Nations Peacekeeping Force in Cyprus and used as a base by United Nations peace-keeping patrol helicopters.

== History ==
By the time of the Second World War, Cyprus had lacked proper airfields equipped with permanent runways. Subsequently, in early 1940, the Royal Air Force decided to establish an operational station at Nicosia. Its existing grass landing ground was far too small, leading to the establishment of a stone quarry half-a-mile from the airfield. Three runways were established by Departmental direct labour, and screening plants were installed from Egypt. Technical facilities and domestic accommodation was also provided on the basis of two squadrons, while water supply was obtained from a nearby deep bore. Construction spanned nine months entirely using local labour. Afterwards, the further construction of additional landing grounds was undertaken by the British Army, including Larnaca, Lakatamia, Limassol, Paphos, Salamis, and Tymbou.

== Units ==
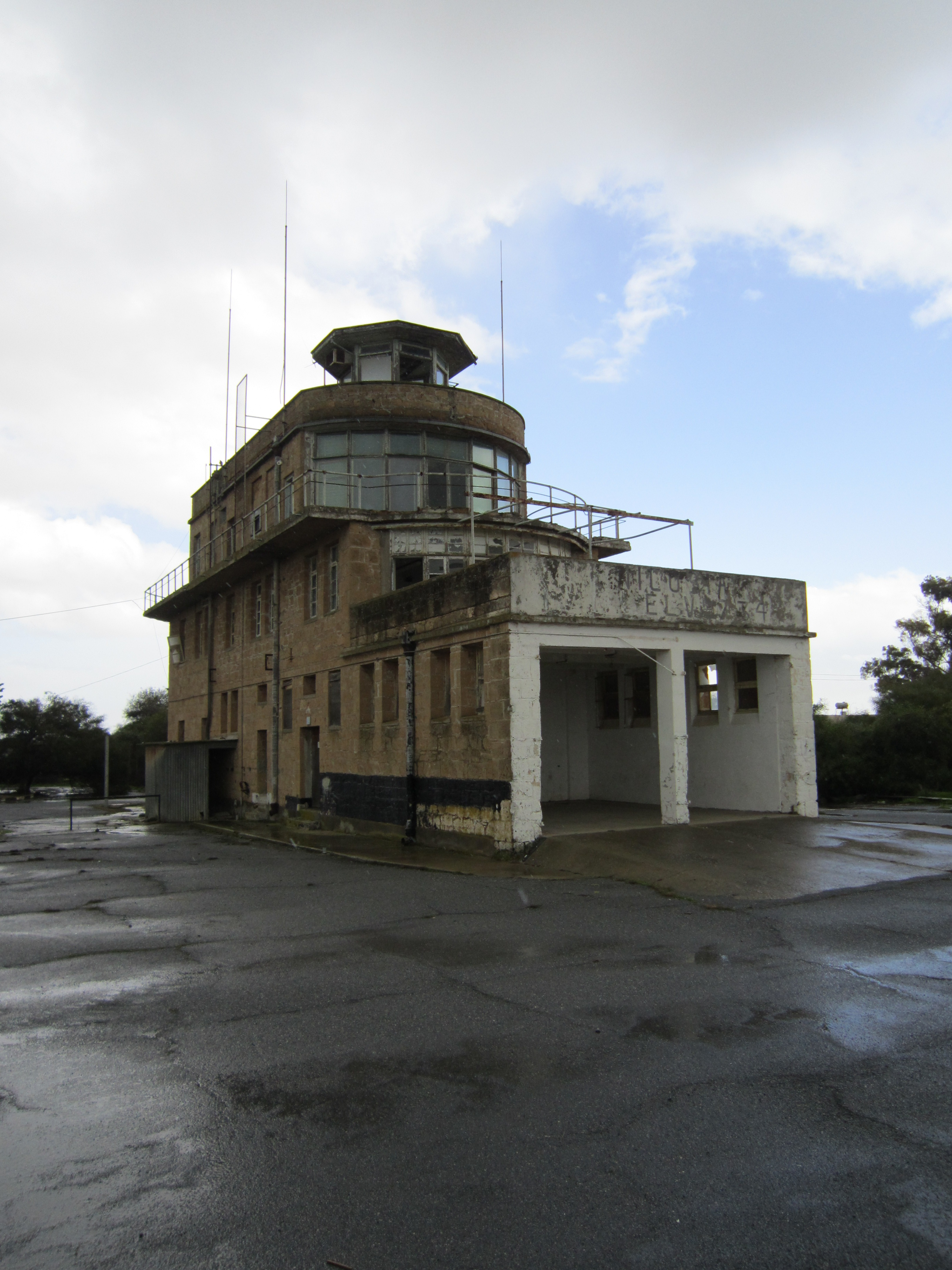
Derelict control tower of Nicosia Airport

- No. 6 Squadron RAF first used the airfield on 3 October 1946 with the Supermarine Spitfire LF.9 before re-equipping with the Hawker Tempest F.6 in December of that year and moving to RAF Shallufa on 5 September 1947. The squadron returned on 5 April 1951 with the de Havilland Vampire FB.5 before leaving to RAF Deversoir on 22 May 1951 however the unit soon returned on 31 May 1952 with the Vampire FB.9 before leaving on 11 July 1952 moving to RAF Habbaniya. The unit returned on 28 August 1954 with the de Havilland Venom FB.1 before moving again to Habbaniya on 5 October 1954, on 7 November 1955 the unit returned for the final time with the Venom FB.4. The squadron moved to Habbaniya on 12 December 1955.
- No. 8 Squadron RAF arrived on 14 August 1950 with the Bristol Brigand B.1, Avro Anson C.19 and Auster AOP.6 from RAF Khormaksar, it returned on 25 September 1950. The squadron came back to Nicosia with just the Brigand on 23 February 1952, returning to Khormaksar on 9 April 1952. On 7 July 1953 the squadron returned with the de Havilland Vampire FB.9, before moving to RAF Deversoir on 14 August 1953. They returned again between 5 September and 20 December 1956 with the de Havilland Venom FB.4
- No. 29 Squadron RAF between 1 March 1963 and 16 March 1964 with the Gloster Javelin FAW.9
- No. 32 Squadron RAF initially between 25 March 1948 and 4 January 1951 with the Supermarine Spitfire FR.18, de Havilland Vampire F.3 & FB.5 then between 11 January and 18 March 1957 with the English Electric Canberra B.2
- No. 39 Squadron RAF between 9 August 1956 and 18 June 1958 with the Gloster Meteor NF.13
- No. 43 Squadron RAF between 21 June 1961 and 1 March 1963 with the Hawker Hunter FGA.9
- Detachment from No. 45 Squadron RAF between 1936 and 1937 with the Fairey Gordon II
- Detachment from No. 46 Squadron RAF between 1942 and 1944
- No. 70 Squadron RAF between 12 December 1955 and 12 July 1966 with the Handley Page Hastings C.1, C.2 & C.4
- No. 73 Squadron RAF initially between 21 April and 27 May 1949 with the Spitfire F.22 and Vampire F.3
- No. 74 Squadron RAF between August and November 1943 with the Spitfire VB & VC
- No. 80 Squadron RAF between 1 May and 16 August 1941 with the Hawker Hurricane I
- No. 84 Squadron RAF initially between 11 March and 31 December 1956 with the Vickers Valetta C.1 then as a detachment from 1972 with the Westland Whirlwind HAR.10
- No. 103 Squadron RAF
- No. 114 Squadron RAF
- No. 127 Squadron RAF
- No. 162 Squadron RAF
- No. 185 Squadron RAF
- No. 203 Squadron RAF
- No. 208 Squadron RAF
- No. 213 Squadron RAF
- No. 230 Squadron RAF
- No. 243 Squadron RAF
- No. 249 Squadron RAF
- No. 250 Squadron RAF
- No. 256 Squadron RAF
- No. 261 Squadron RAF
- No. 272 Squadron RAF
- No. 284 Squadron RAF
- No. 294 Squadron RAF
- No. 451 Squadron RAAF
- No. 459 Squadron RAAF
- No. 603 Squadron RAF
- No. 680 Squadron RAF
- No. 14 Squadron RNZAF – operating de Havilland Vampire (1952–55)
- No. 26 Armament Practice Camp between 15 April 1948 and 19 February 1951
- Armament Practice Camp (Middle East) between 31 January and 1 February 1956

=== RAF Regiments ===
- No. 2 Squadron RAF Regiment
- No. 21 Squadron RAF Regiment
- No. 26 Squadron RAF Regiment
- No. 27 Squadron RAF Regiment
- No. 29 Squadron RAF Regiment
- No. 34 Squadron RAF Regiment
- No. 37 Squadron RAF Regiment

=== Army Air Corps ===
- No. 19 Liaison Flight AAC with the de Havilland Beaver AL.1 during 1964
- No. 21 Reconnaissance Flight AAC with the Auster AOP.6 during 1964

== Current use ==
The site is now the currently largely disused Nicosia International Airport.
