= Martin Baltimore =

US light bomber aircraft

Baltimore
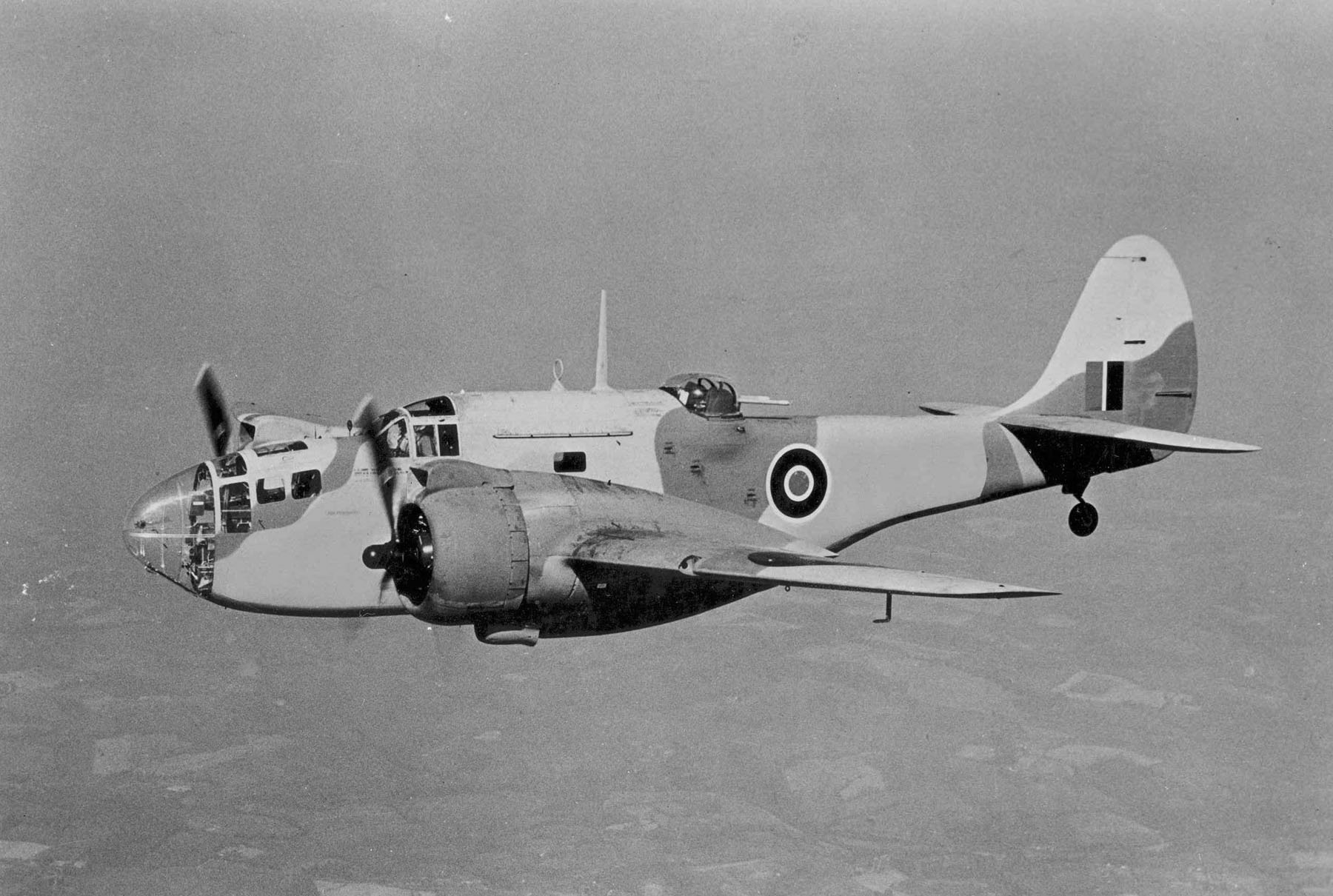
- Royal Air Force Martin Baltimore GR.IV/V

General information
- Type: Light bomber Reconnaissance
- National origin: United States
- Manufacturer: Glenn L. Martin Company
- Primary users: Royal Air Force Royal Canadian Air Force; Royal Australian Air Force; South African Air Force
- Number built: 1,575

History
- Introduction date: 1941
- First flight: 14 June 1941
- Retired: 1949
- Developed from: Martin Maryland

The Martin 187 Baltimore was a twin-engined light attack bomber built by the Glenn L. Martin Company in the United States as the A-30. The model was originally ordered by the French in May 1940 as a follow-up to the earlier Martin Maryland, then in service in France. With the fall of France, the production series was diverted to the United Kingdom and after mid-1941, supplied by the U.S. as Lend Lease equipment.

Development of the Baltimore was hindered by a series of problems, although the type eventually became a versatile combat aircraft. Produced in large numbers, the Baltimore was not used operationally by United States armed forces but eventually served with the British, Canadian, Australian, South African, Hellenic and the Italian air forces. It was subsequently used almost exclusively in the Mediterranean and Middle East theatre of World War II.

== Design and development ==
Initially called the A-23 (derived from the A-22 Martin 167 Maryland design), the Model 187 (company name) had a deeper fuselage and more powerful engines. The Model 187 met the needs for a light-to-medium bomber, originally ordered by the Anglo-French Purchasing Commission as a joint project in May 1940. The French Air Force sought to replace the earlier Maryland; 400 aircraft being ordered. With the Fall of France, the Royal Air Force (RAF) took over the order and gave it the service name Baltimore. To enable the aircraft to be supplied to the British under the Lend-Lease Act the United States Army Air Forces name A-30 was allocated. (Note: Under the provisions of Lend-Lease, aircraft supplied to Allied nations had first to be purchased by the USAAC and be taken onto that service's inventory. Thus, aircraft not requested by the USAAC had still to be allocated a USAAC name, in this case 'A-30'.) With the passing of the Lend Lease Act two further batches of 575 and then 600 were provided to the RAF.

== Operational history ==
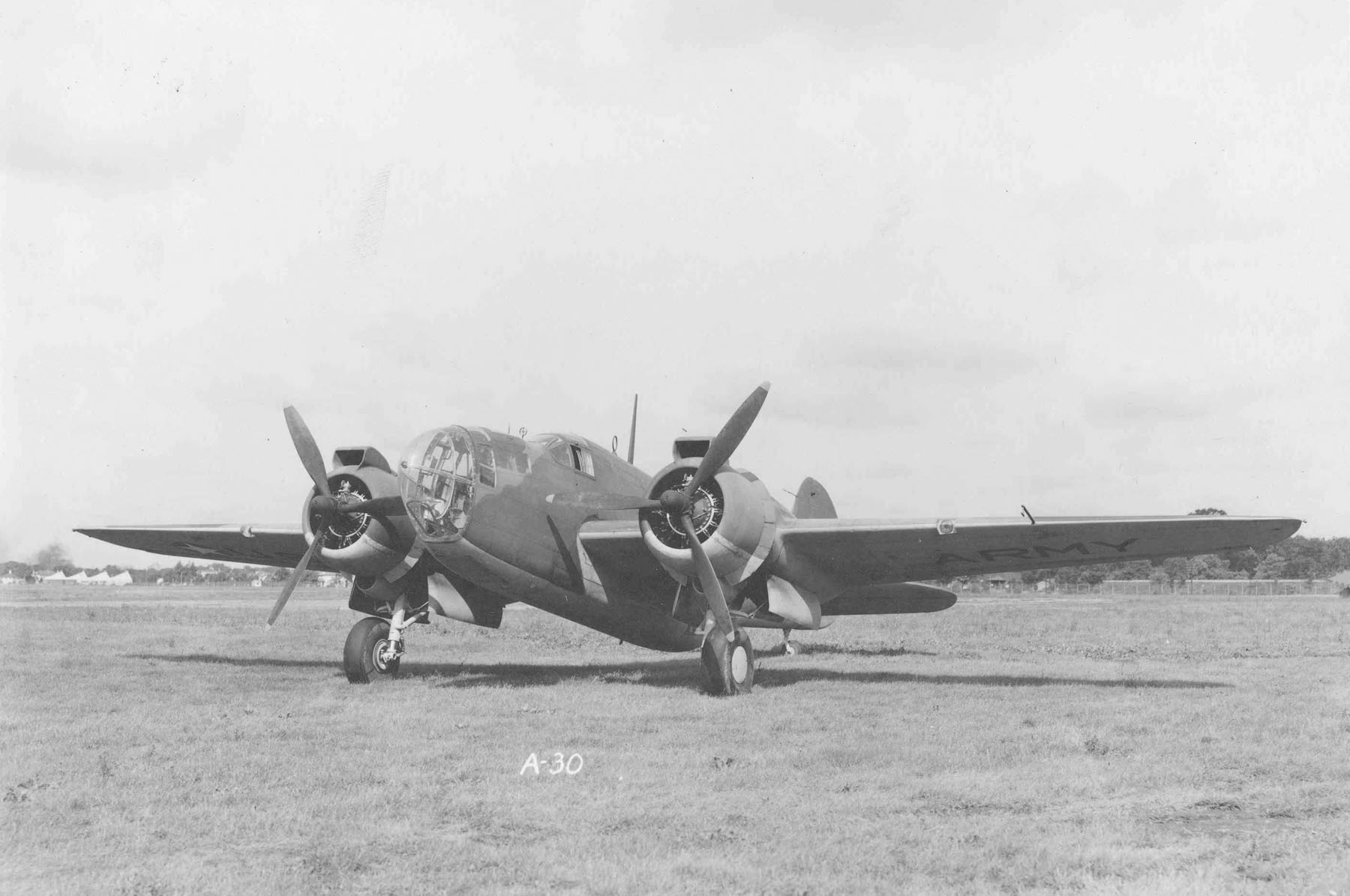
Martin A-30 in USAAF colors prior to delivery

The first British aircraft were delivered in late 1941 to equip Operational Training Units. The RAF only used the Baltimores operationally in the Mediterranean theater and North Africa. Many users were impressed by the step up that the Baltimore represented from older aircraft like the Bristol Blenheim. Users of the Baltimore and Martin pilot Benjamin R. Wallace, praised the aircraft for its heavy armament, structural strength, manoeuvrability, bombing accuracy and relatively high performance but crews complained of cramped conditions similar to those in the earlier Maryland bomber. The narrow fuselage made it nearly impossible for crew members to change positions during flight if wounded (the aircraft's interior structure separated the pilot and observer from the wireless operator and rear gunner, a characteristic shared with several light and medium bomber designs of that era including the Handley Page Hampden, Douglas Boston and Blenheim). Crews also complained about the difficulties in handling the aircraft on the ground. On takeoff, the pilot had to co-ordinate the throttles perfectly to avoid a nose-over or worse.

First used in action to stop Rommel's advance, the Baltimore suffered massive losses when it was used as a low-level attack aircraft, in large part due to being unescorted. Operating at medium altitude with fighter escorts, the Baltimore had a very low loss rate, with the majority of losses coming from operational accidents. Undertaking a variety of missions in the Middle East, Mediterranean and European theaters, the Baltimore's roles included reconnaissance, target-towing, maritime patrol, night intruder and as a somewhat uncomfortable fast transport. The Baltimore saw limited Fleet Air Arm service with aircraft transferred from the RAF in the Mediterranean to equip a squadron in 1944. Used in the anti-submarine role during the war, the Baltimore achieved moderate success, sinking up to eight U-boats.

The RAF also transferred aircraft to other Allies in the Mediterranean area. The Baltimore was used intensively in the Italian campaign to clear the road to Rome for advancing Allied forces after the Italian surrender on 3 September 1943. After the Armistice between Italy and Allied armed forces an Italian-manned squadron, the 28th Bomber Wing, was equipped with ex-RAF Baltimores, becoming the co-belligerent Stormo Baltimore. The Italians suffered considerable attrition during their training phase on the Baltimore. The majority of accidents were during takeoffs and landings due to the aircraft's fairly high wing loading, high approach speed and a directional stability problems during takeoffs. The Italians operated the Baltimore for about six months. Many of those operations were in Yugoslavia and Greece, providing air support for partisan forces or dropping supplies.

Most Baltimores were scrapped soon after the war, although one RAF squadron continued to use the type in Kenya where the aircraft were used in aerial mapping and locust control until 1948. In post-war service, the Baltimore took part in United States Navy instrument and control surface tests in the effort to break the sound barrier. With its powerful engines and light, yet robust construction, the aircraft was able to dive at high speed, reaching Mach .74 in tests. All Baltimores were withdrawn from service by the end of 1949, the last one being retired on 23 December 1949.

In 2025, the wreck of a Baltimore of 454 Squadron (Royal Australian Air Force) was discovered off the coast of the Mediterranean island Antikythera. On 3 December 1943, the aircraft had been on a reconnaissance mission from its base in Bengazi, Libya, when it was shot down by two Messerschmitt fighters.

== Variants ==
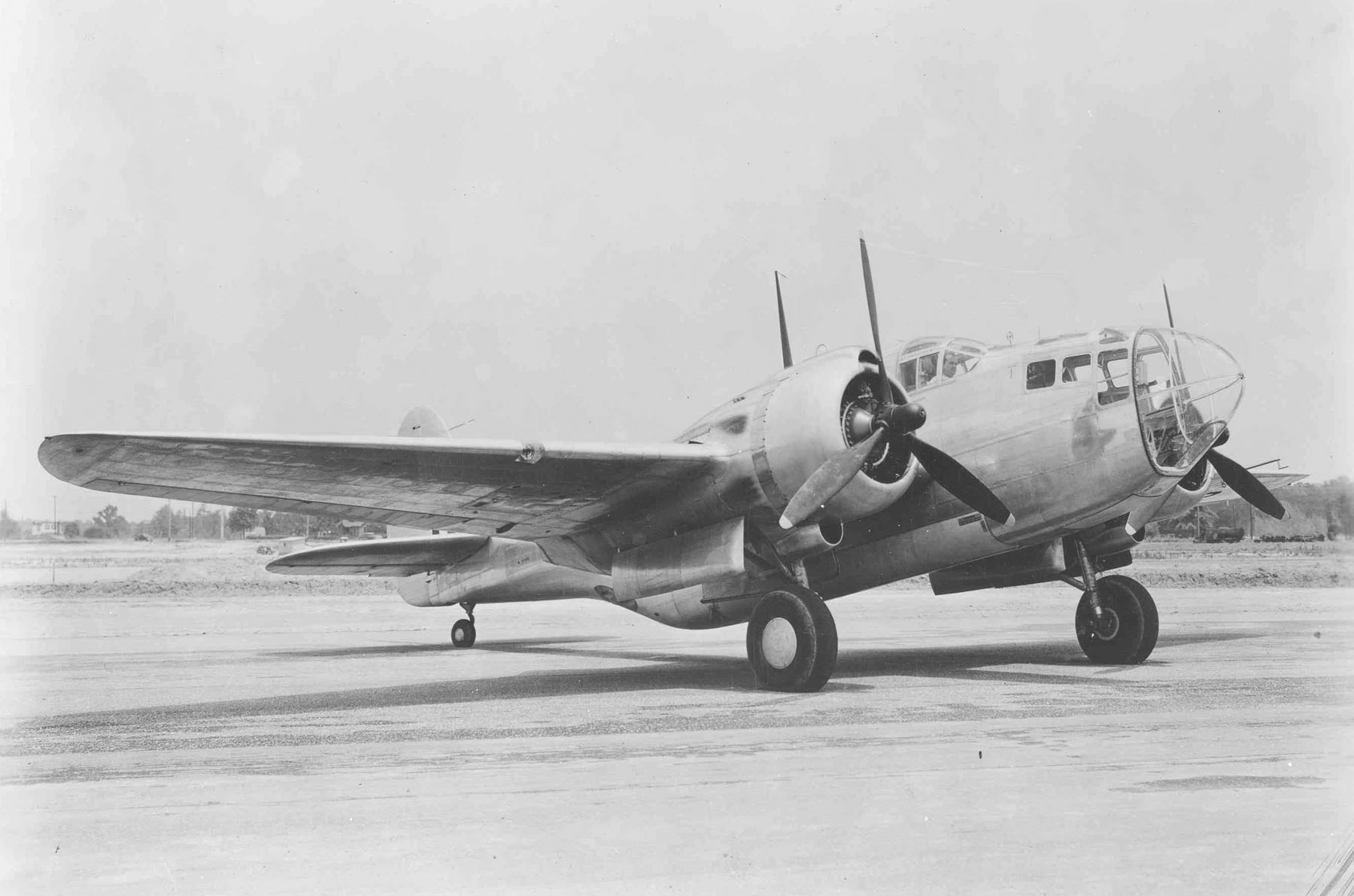
Martin Baltimore GR.I

Baltimore B. I
Fitted with 1,600 hp (1,193 kW) Wright GR-2600-A5B radial piston engines, armed with 10 0.303 in (7.7 mm) machine guns, eight fixed Brownings and two flexible Vickers K machine guns; all marks had two fixed 0.303 in (7.7 mm) Brownings in the leading-edge of each wing and four similar fixed guns, two on each side of the lower fuselage aft firing backwards, plus two flexible Vickers K guns in dorsal and ventral. 50 aircraft built.

Baltimore B. II
Defensive armament increased to 12 0.303 in (7.7 mm) machine guns including twin 0.303 in (7.7 mm) Vickers K machine guns in both the dorsal and ventral positions. Otherwise the same as the Mk I. 100 aircraft built.

Baltimore B. III

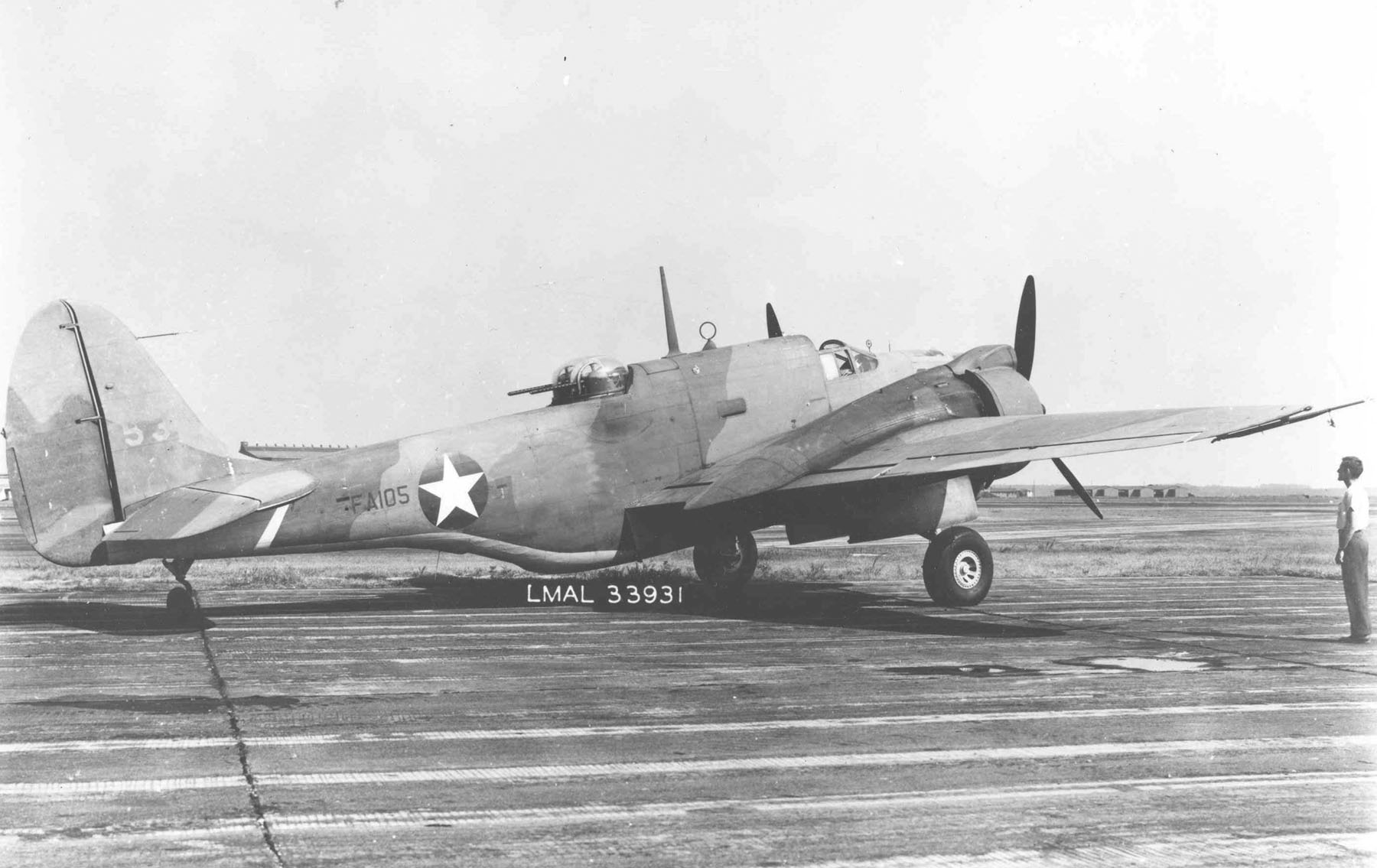
The Baltimore GR.IIIA variant supplied to the British under the Lend-Lease program. This variant was equipped with a Martin dorsal turret housing twin .50-caliber M2 machine guns.

Modified Mk II design with defensive armament increased to 14 0.303 in (7.7 mm) guns by the replacement in the UK of the original dorsal turret with a hydraulically powered turret supplied by Boulton Paul fitted with four Browning machine guns. 250 aircraft built.

Baltimore B. IIIa (A-30-MA)
Ordered by USAAF and supplied under Lend-lease to the RAF, two 0.50 in (12.7 mm) machine guns in a Martin-built electrically powered dorsal turret. 281 aircraft built.

Baltimore B. IV (A-30A-MA)
USAAF order, lend-lease to RAF. Four 0.303 in (7.7 mm) Brownings machine guns in the wings. 294 aircraft built.

Baltimore B. V (A-30A-MA)
USAAF order, upgraded with two 1,700 hp (1,268 kW) Wright R-2600-29 radial piston engines, and with 0.50 in (12.7 mm) machine guns in the wings. 600 aircraft built.

Baltimore GR. VI (A-30C-MA)
Two prototypes built for maritime reconnaissance. They included a lengthened fuselage, accommodations for extra fuel tanks and a torpedo, and a Radome in nose. The whole program was cancelled in April 1944.

All of the series were built for the RAF. A number were lost on delivery across the Atlantic Ocean when two ships carrying Baltimores were sunk.

== Operators ==
Australia

- Royal Australian Air Force
  - No. 454 Squadron RAAF (Baltimore III, IV, V) (North Africa, Pescara Italy: February 1943 – 14 August 1945)
  - No. 459 Squadron RAAF (Baltimore IV – V) (Mediterranean: July 1944 – March 1945)

Canada

- Royal Canadian Air Force
  - Baltimore B. III FA187
    - A single Baltimore was loaned to the RCAF by RAF Ferry Command for "special" project duties (1942)

Free France

- Free French Air Force
  - GB 1/17

Greece

- Royal Hellenic Air Force
  - RHAF 13 Light Bomber Squadron (Baltimore II, IV) (Gambut North Africa, Biferno Pescara Italy, Balkans: 1943–1945)

Kingdom of Italy

- Italian Co-Belligerent Air Force – 49 aircraft
  - 28° Gruppo (Stormo Baltimore) (1945 – February 1948)
  - 132° Gruppo – 254 Wing RAF

Italy

- Italian Air Force operated 49 aircraft until 1947

South Africa

- South African Air Force
  - No. 15 Squadron SAAF (Baltimore IIIa – V) (Mediterranean: 1943–1945)
  - No. 21 Squadron SAAF. (Baltimore III – IV) (North Africa, Italy: 1942–1944)
  - No. 60 Squadron SAAF (Baltimore II – III) (North Africa: 1942–1943)

Turkey

- Turkish Air Force
  - 1st Bomber Regiment

United Kingdom

- Royal Air Force
  - 1st Middle East Training Squadron
  - No. 13 Squadron RAF (Baltimore IV – V) (Italy: 1944)
  - No. 52 Squadron RAF (Baltimore IIIa – V) (Tunisia, Italy: February 1942 – February 1943)
  - No. 55 Squadron RAF (Baltimore I – V) (Libya, Tunisia, Italy: 1942–1944)
  - No. 69 Squadron RAF (Baltimore I – IV) (Mediterranean: 1942–1944)
  - No. 162 Squadron RAF (Baltimore III) (Libya: 1943–1944)
  - No. 203 Squadron RAF (Baltimore I, II, IIIa, V) (North Africa: 1942–1943)
  - No. 223 Squadron RAF (Baltimore I – V) (North Africa, Italy: April 1941 – 12 August 1944)
  - No. 249 Squadron RAF (Baltimore IV – V) (South-East Europe: October 1945 – April 1946)
  - No. 500 Squadron RAF (Baltimore IV – V) (Italy: 1944–1945)
  - No. 680 Squadron RAF (Baltimore III, V) (Italy: 1944)
- Fleet Air Arm
  - 728 Naval Air Squadron (Baltimore GR IV – V) (Malta: September 1944 – October 1946)

== Surviving aircraft ==
Although the Baltimore was produced in greater numbers than any other Martin design except the B-26 Marauder, with 1575 produced, no aircraft have survived intact, although the wreckage of several are known to exist.

== Specifications (Baltimore GR.V) ==
Martin 187 Baltimore 3-view drawing

Data from Jane's Fighting Aircraft of World War II.

General characteristics

- Crew: four: pilot, navigator/bombardier, radio operator, gunner
- Length: 48 ft 6 in (14.8 m)
- Wingspan: 61 ft 4 in (18.7 m)
- Height: 14 ft 2 in (4.32 m)
- Wing area: 538.5 sq ft (50 m^{2})
- Empty weight: 15,991 lb (7,253 kg)
- Gross weight: 23,185 lb (10,900 kg)
- Powerplant: 2 × Wright GR-2600-A5B geared radial engines, 1,700 hp (1,268 kW) each

Performance

- Maximum speed: 305 mph (488 km/h, 295 kn) at 11,600 ft (3,540 m)
- Cruise speed: 224 mph (360 km/h, 195 kn)
- Range: 980 mi (1,577 km, 850 nmi)
- Wing loading: 46.2 lb/sq ft (226 kg/m^{2})
- Power/mass: 0.14 hp/lb (220 W/kg)

Armament

- Guns:
  - 4 × wing mounted 0.30 in (7.62 mm) M1919 Browning machine guns
  - 2–4 × 0.303 in (7.7 mm) machine guns in dorsal turret
  - 2 × 0.303 in (7.7 mm) machine guns in ventral position
  - provisions for up to 4 × fixed rear firing 0.303 in (7.7 mm) machine guns.
- Bombs: 2,000 lb (910 kg) carried internally

== See also ==
Related development

- Martin Maryland

Aircraft of comparable role, configuration, and era

- Bristol Beaufort
- Dornier Do 215
- Kawasaki Ki-48
- Mitsubishi G4M
- Nakajima Ki-49
- Lockheed Hudson

Related lists

- List of aircraft of the Royal Air Force
- List of aircraft of World War II
- List of military aircraft of the United States
