= No. 294 Squadron RAF =

Former flying squadron of the Royal Air Force

- Active: 24 Sep 1943 – 8 Apr 1946
- Country: United Kingdom
- Branch: Royal Air Force
- Role: Air-sea rescue
- Part of: RAF Middle East Command
- Mottos: Latin: Vita ex undix abrepta (Translation: "Life snatched from the waves")

Insignia
- Squadron Badge heraldry: An eagle volant, carrying in the claws a lifebelt
- Squadron Codes: FD (Sep 1943 – Apr 1946)

No. 294 Squadron was a Royal Air Force air search and rescue (ASR) squadron active under RAF Middle East Command. During World War II the unit operated rescue missions for Allied aircraft and aircrew over the eastern Mediterranean and later the Persian Gulf and Arabian Sea.

== History ==
No. 294 Squadron was formed at Berka, near Benghazi, Libya on 24 September 1943 from a former air-sea rescue flight. It was equipped with the Vickers Wellington and Supermarine Walrus in the ASR role. The squadron's aircraft were detached to various airfields around the eastern Mediterranean. In October 1943 the squadron moved to Landing Ground 91 (LG.91) in Egypt, but still provided detachments to other airfields. In March 1944 the squadron moved to RAF Idku, still in Egypt, and re-equipped with the Wellington Mk.XI and later also the Wellington Mk.XIII and the Vickers Warwick. In June 1945 the squadron moved to RAF Basra, Iraq to provide rescue cover in the Persian Gulf and Arabian sea until it was disbanded on 8 April 1946.

== Aircraft operated ==
Aircraft operated by No. 294 Squadron
From	To	Aircraft	Variant	Notes
September 1943	March 1944	Vickers Wellington	Mk.Ic	Twin-engined bomber operated in the search and rescue role.
September 1943	April 1946	Supermarine Walrus	Mks.I, II	Single pusher-engined biplane rescue amphibian
March 1944	November 1944	Vickers Wellington	Mk.XI	Twin-engined bomber operated in the search and rescue role.
May 1944	April 1946	Vickers Wellington	Mk.XIII	Special ASR version of the twin-engined bomber
November 1944	April 1946	Vickers Warwick	Mk.I	Twin-engined bomber operated in the search and rescue role.

== Squadron bases ==
Bases and airfields used by No. 294 Squadron
From	To	Base	Remark
24 September 1943	5 October 1943	Berka, Libya	Dets. at RAF Limassol, RAF Lakatamia Cyprus; LG.07; Mellaha, Libya; Derna, Libya; Gambut, Libya
5 October 1943	29 March 1944	LG.91/Amriya South, Egypt	Dets. at RAF Lakatamia Cyprus; Berka III, Libya; Derna, Libya; Mellaha, Libya; RAF Castel Benito, Libya; LG.07; RAF St Jean, Palestine and RAF Hergla, Tunisia
29 March 1944	6 June 1945	RAF Idku, Egypt	Dets at Gambut 3, Libya; Berka III, Libya; RAF El Arish, Egypt and RAF Nicosia, Cyprus
6 June 1945	8 April 1946	RAF Basra, Iraq	Dets. at RAF Sharjah, Trucial States; RAF Masirah, Oman and RAF Muharraq, Bahrain

== Commanding officers ==
Officers commanding No. 294 Squadron
From	To	Name
September 1943	December 1943	F/Lt. S.A.M. Morrison
January 1944	February 1945	W/Cdr. R.G.M. Walker, DFC
February 1945	June 1945	W/Cdr. D.B. Bennett, DFC

== See also ==
- List of Royal Air Force aircraft squadrons
- List of North African airfields during World War II
