= No. 252 Squadron RAF =

Defunct flying squadron of the Royal Air Force

- Active: 1 May 1918 – 30 June 1919; 21 November 1940 – 15 June 1941; 14 November 1941 – 1 December 1946
- Country: United Kingdom
- Branch: Royal Air Force
- Motto: With or on

Insignia
- Squadron Badge: A Spartan Shield
- Squadron Codes: PN (Nov 1940 – May 1941); BT (May 1941 –Nov 1942)

No. 252 Squadron RAF was a Royal Air Force (RAF) squadron that formed as a bomber unit in World War I and re-formed as part of RAF Coastal Command in World War II.

== History ==
=== Formation and World War I ===
No. 252 Squadron was formed at Tynemouth on 1 May 1918 as a day bomber unit when four RNAS flights were amalgamated and was equipped with the Blackburn Kangaroo and DH.6s. One of these flights, No. 510 (Special Duty) Flight was posted to Redcar with its DH.6s for protection of shipping in the Teesport area until 21 January 1919.

The squadron disbanded at RNAS Killingholme on 30 June 1919.

=== Re-formation in World War II ===
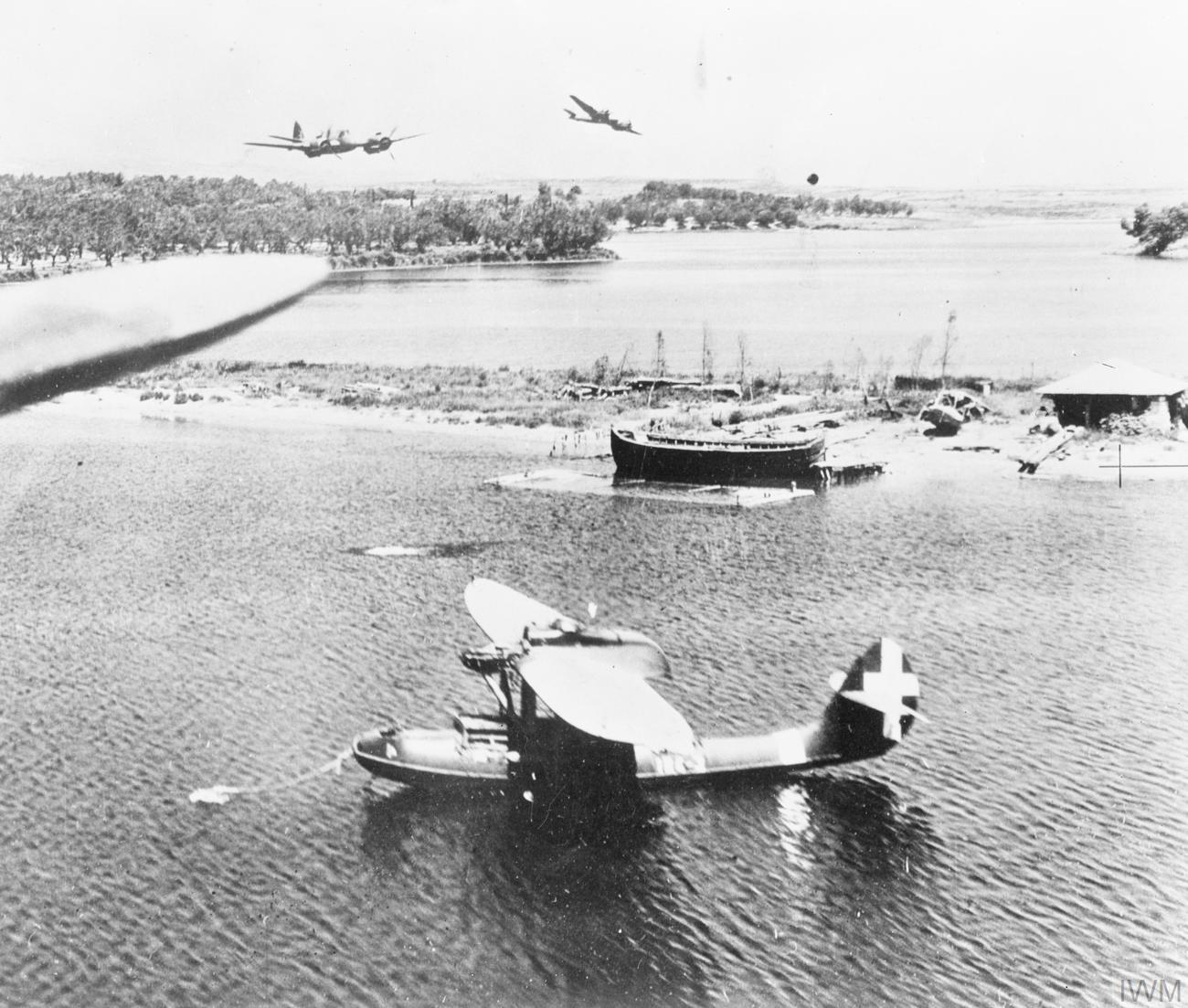
252 Sqn Beaufighters attacking an Italian seaplane base at Preveza, 19 July 1943.

On 21 November 1940 the squadron re-formed at RAF Bircham Newton and was equipped with Blenheims and Beaufighters as a Coastal Command unit. It moved to Northern Ireland in April 1941 and an attachment went to Gibraltar. In May 1941, 13 Beaufighters from No. 252 Squadron were sent to Malta.

The squadron was disbanded upon renumbering as No. 143 Squadron RAF on 15 June 1941 and re-established at Idku, Egypt on 14 Nov 1941. It then operated from Libya and various locations in Greece and was finally disbanded on 1 December 1946.

=== Aircraft operated ===
Aircraft operated by no. 252 Squadron RAF
From	To	Aircraft	Variant
May 1918	Jan 1919	Airco DH.6	
May 1918	Aug 1918	Blackburn Kangaroo	
Dec 1940	Apr 1941	Bristol Blenheim	IF
Dec 1940	Apr 1941	Bristol Beaufighter	IVF
Dec 1940	Jun 1941	Bristol Beaufighter	IC
Nov 1941	Jan 1944	Bristol Beaufighter	IC
Sep 1942	Jan 1944	Bristol Beaufighter	VIC
Jun 1943	Jan 1944	Bristol Beaufighter	XI
Jun 1944	Dec 1946	Bristol Beaufighter	X
