= No. 162 Squadron RAF =

Defunct flying squadron of the Royal Air Force

- Active: 1 June 1918 – 4 July 1918; 4 January 1942 – 25 September 1944; 18 December 1944 – 14 July 1945
- Country: United Kingdom
- Branch: Royal Air Force
- Mottos: One time, one purpose

Insignia
- Squadron Badge: An erased head of a bat in front of a meteor

No. 162 Squadron RAF was a Royal Air Force Squadron that was a radio jamming/calibration and light bomber unit in World War II.

== History ==
=== Formation and World War I ===
No. 162 Squadron Royal Flying Corps was formed on 1 June 1918 but it was not equipped with any aircraft and was disbanded on 4 July 1918 without becoming operational.

=== Reformation in World War II ===
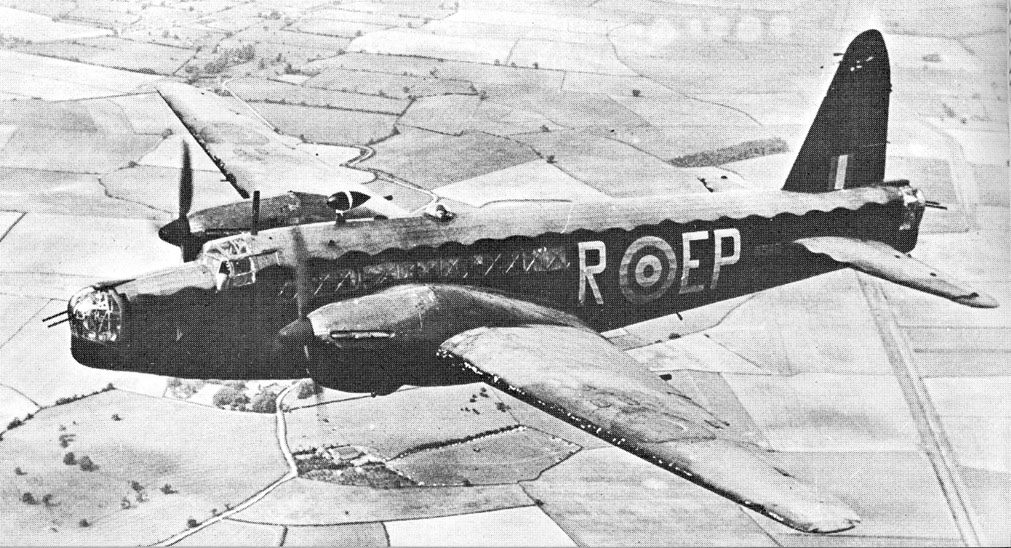
Vickers Wellington

The squadron reformed on 1 January 1942 at RAF Kabrit, Egypt and was equipped with Wellingtons and Blenheim aircraft on radio jamming operations against the Afrika Korps. It was disbanded on 25 September 1944 and reformed at RAF Bourn on 18 December 1944 as a Mosquito squadron on operations over Germany as part of the Light Night Striking Force. It was finally disbanded on 14 July 1946, having transferred to RAF Transport Command operating a mail service.

== Aircraft operated ==
Aircraft operated by No. 162 Squadron RAF
From	To	Aircraft	Variant
Jan 1942	Feb 1944	Vickers Wellington	IC
Feb 1942	Jul 1942	Bristol Blenheim	IV
Jul 1942	Jan 1944	Bristol Blenheim	V
Sep 1943	Nov 1943	Vickers Wellington	III
Sep 1943	Jan 1944	Martin Baltimore	II
Oct 1943	Nov 1943	Martin Baltimore	I
Oct 1943	Jan 1944	de Havilland Mosquito	VI
Jan 1944	Jul 1944	Vickers Wellington	III
Jan 1944	Sep 1944	Martin Baltimore	III
Mar 1944	Jul 1944	Vickers Wellington	DWI
Apr 1944	Sep 1944	Vickers Wellington	X
Apr 1944	Jul 1944	de Havilland Mosquito	VI
Dec 1944	Jul 1946	de Havilland Mosquito	XXV
Feb 1945	Jul 1946	de Havilland Mosquito	XX
