= 151st Aviation Regiment =

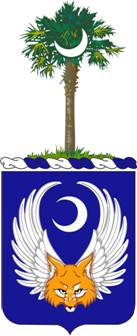
- coat of arms
- Country: United States of America
- Branch: United States Army Aviation Branch
- Type: Aviation
- Part of: South Carolina Army National Guard

Aircraft flown
- Attack helicopter: AH-64E Apache
- Cargo helicopter: CH-47F Chinook
- Utility helicopter: UH-72A Lakota UH-60 Blackhawk

The 151st Aviation Regiment is an aviation regiment of the U.S. Army, primarily provided by the South Carolina Army National Guard.

== Structure ==
- 1st Battalion (Attack Reconnaissance) "Marauders" at McEntire Joint National Guard Base, Eastover
  - Company A (AH-64) "Nightmare"
    - Iraq 2004 - 2005
    - Afghanistan 2017 - 2018
  - Company B (AH-64) "Mustang"
    - Iraq 2004 - 2005
  - Company C (AH-64) "Checkmate"
- 2nd Battalion (Security and Support) "Raiders" at Army Aviation Support Facility #2, Donaldson Center Airport (SC ARNG)
  - Company A (UH-72A/UH-72B)
    - Detachment 1 (VA ARNG)
    - Company A (HQ) at Army Aviation Support Facility #2, Donaldson Center Airport (SC ARNG)
  - Company B (UH-72A)
    - Detachment 1 (NC ARNG)
  - Company C
    - (-) at Army Aviation Support Facility #1 Joint Base Berry Field (TN ARNG)"GHOSTRIDERS"'
    - Detachment 1 at General Lucius D. Clay National Guard Center (GA ARNG)
  - Company D
    - Detachment 1 (MS ARNG),(LA ARNG)

== Distinctive unit insignia ==
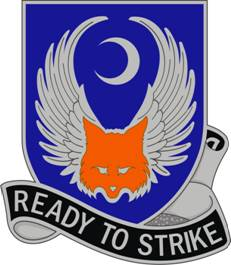
