= 117th Engineer Brigade =

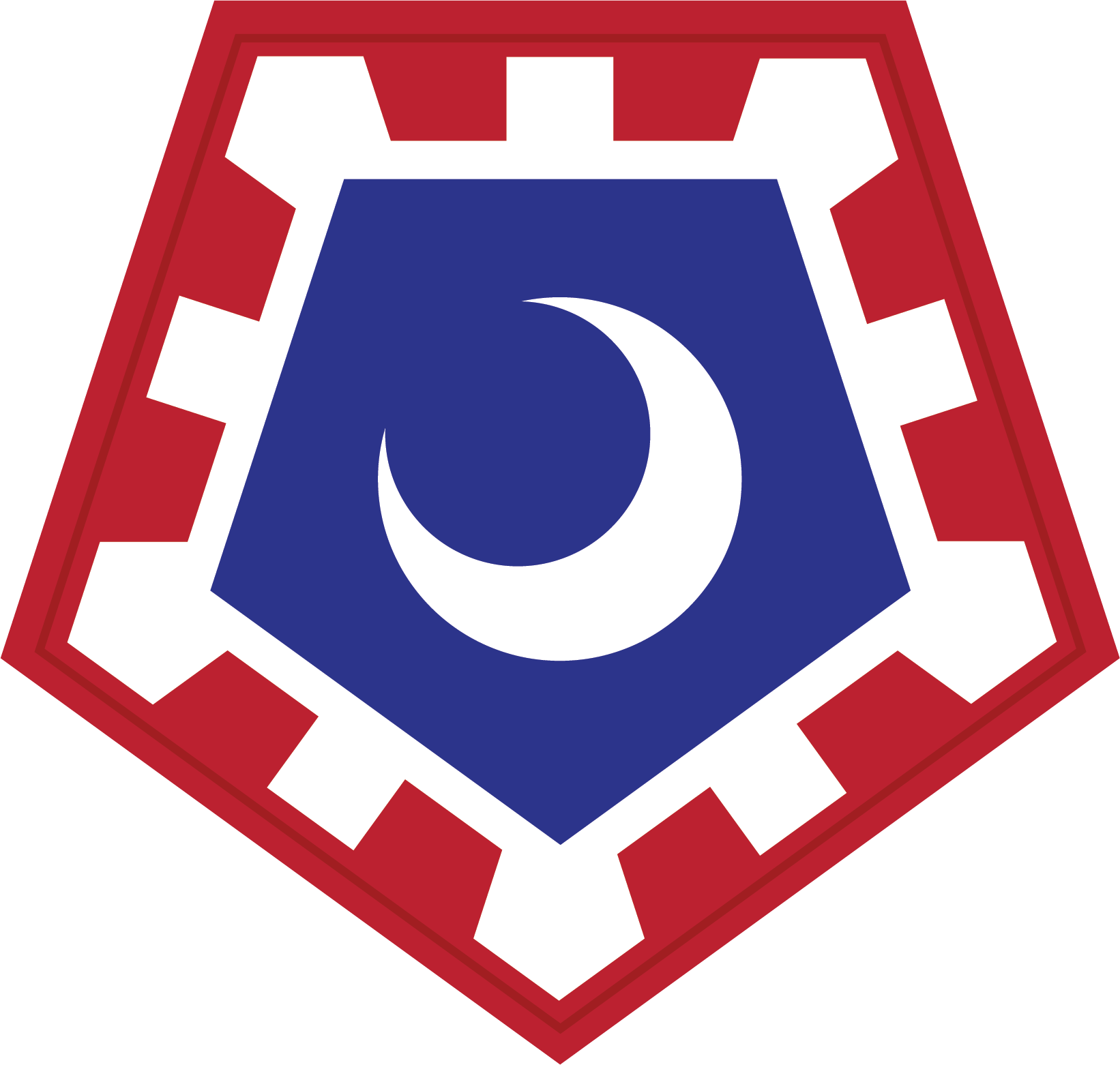
- Active: 2019 - present
- Country: United States
- Branch: United States Army National Guard
- Type: Engineer
- Size: Brigade
- Part of: South Carolina Army National Guard
- Garrison/HQ: Newberry Readiness Center, Newberry, SC

Commanders
- Current commander: Col. William Matheny
- Command Sergeant Major: Michael L. Cook
- Notable commanders: Col. James Fowler (First Commanding Officer); CSM Peter Heggie (First Command Sergeant Major)

Insignia
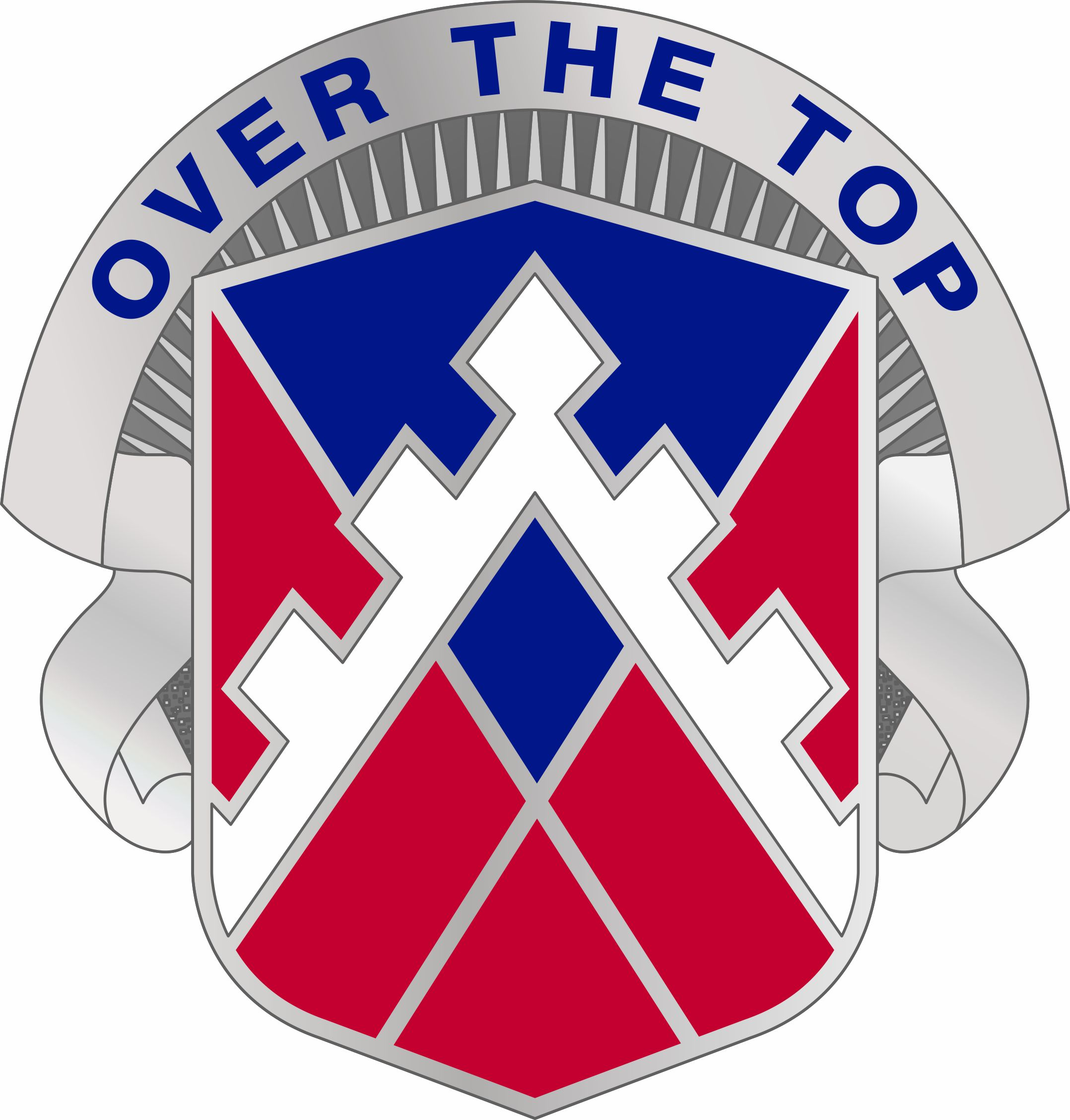
- 117th Engineer Brigade DUI

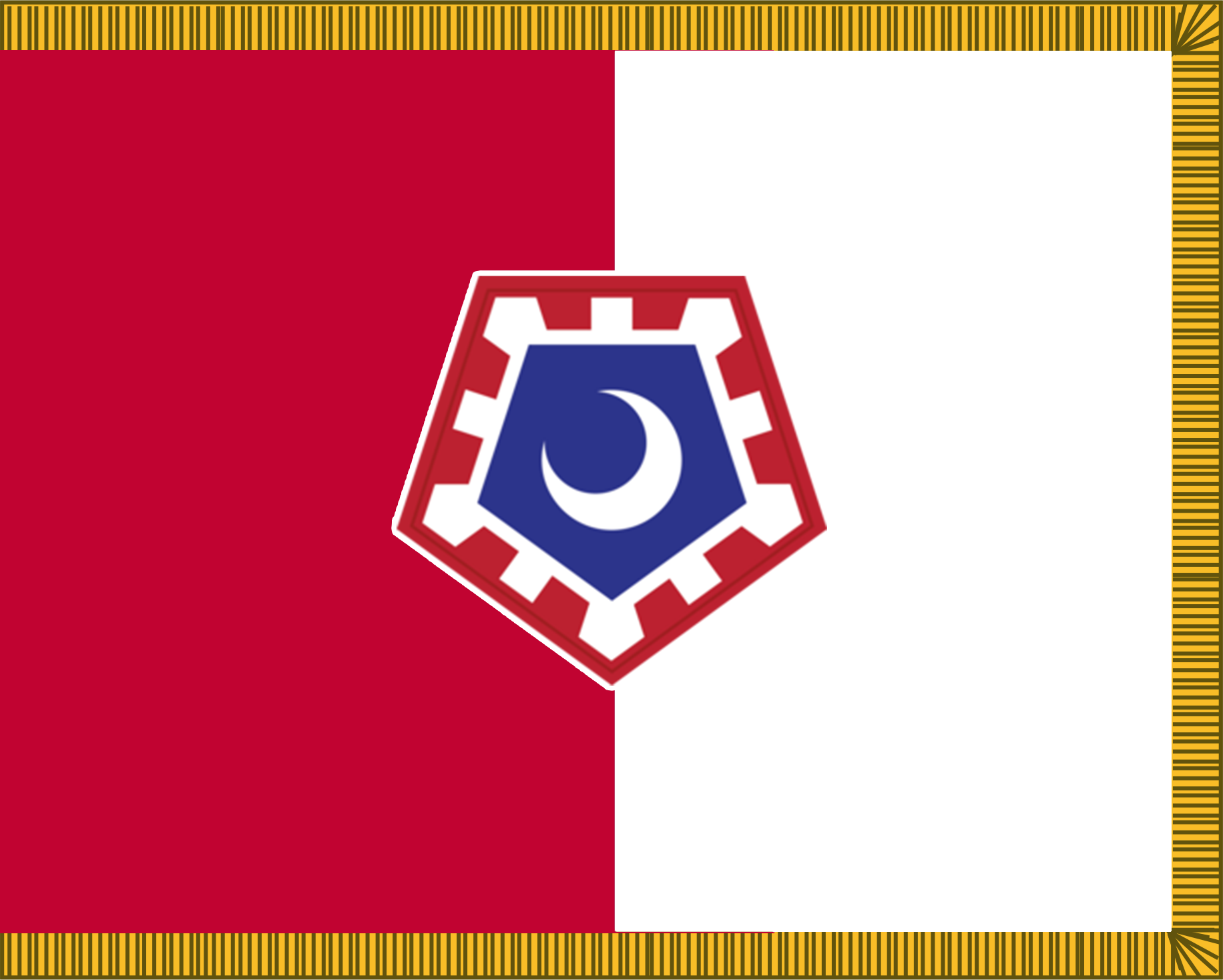
- 117th Engineer Brigade Flag

The 117th Engineer Brigade is a unit of the South Carolina National Guard since November 2019. The brigade's mission is to provide central command of all engineering assets in the SCARNG. One of the first missions the brigade had after activation was supporting the COVID-19 crisis. The engineering battalions have provided debris clearing in state disasters as well as firefighting and civil construction support.

== Organization ==
- 117th Engineer Brigade, in Newberry
  - Headquarters and Headquarters Company, 117th Engineer Brigade, in Newberry
  - 710th Engineer Detachment (Explosive Hazards Coordination Cell), in Conway
  - 122nd Engineer Battalion, in Edgefield
    - Headquarters and Headquarters Company, 122nd Engineer Battalion, in Edgefield
    - Forward Support Company, 122nd Engineer Battalion, in Edgefield
    - 124th Engineer Company (Mobility Augmentation Company), in Saluda
    - 125th Engineer Company (Multirole Bridge), in Abbeville
      - Detachment 1, 125th Engineer Company (Multirole Bridge), in Clarks Hill
    - 1220th Engineer Platoon (Area Clearance), in Batesburg
    - 1221st Engineer Company (Clearance), in Graniteville
    - 1226th Engineer Detachment (Asphalt), in Batesburg
    - 1227th Engineer Detachment (Concrete Section), in Batesburg
  - 178th Engineer Battalion, in Rock Hill
    - Headquarters and Headquarters Company, 178th Engineer Battalion, in Rock Hill
    - Forward Support Company, 178th Engineer Battalion, in Rock Hill
    - 174th Combat Engineer Company Armored (CEC-A), in Wellford
    - 679th Engineer Detachment (Utilities), in Chester
    - 1222nd Engineer Company (Sapper), in Fort Mill
    - 1223rd Engineer Company (Vertical Construction Company), in Walterboro
    - 1782nd Engineer Company (Engineer Construction Company), in Lancaster
    - 264th Engineer Detachment (Fire Fighting Team — HQ), at McCrady Training Center
    - 265th Engineer Detachment (Fire Fighting Team — Fire Truck), at McCrady Training Center
    - 266th Engineer Detachment (Fire Fighting Team — Fire Truck), at McCrady Training Center
    - 267th Engineer Detachment (Fire Fighting Team — Fire Truck), at McCrady Training Center
    - 268th Engineer Detachment (Fire Fighting Team — Fire Truck), at McCrady Training Center
