= 228th Theater Tactical Signal Brigade =

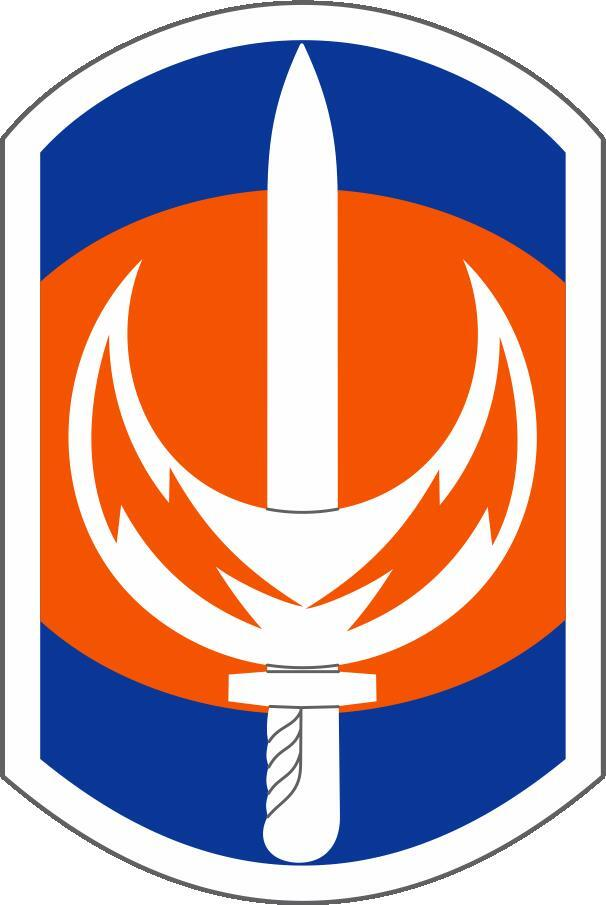
- Active: 1917 - present
- Country: United States
- Branch: United States Army National Guard
- Role: Signal
- Size: Brigade
- Part of: South Carolina Army National Guard
- Garrison/HQ: Spartanburg, SC
- Motto: Strength in Electronics
- Website: https://www.facebook.com/228thSignalBrigade/

Commanders
- Current commander: Lt. Col. Clay N. Middleton
- Command Sergeant Major: CSM Lenin O. Castillo

Insignia
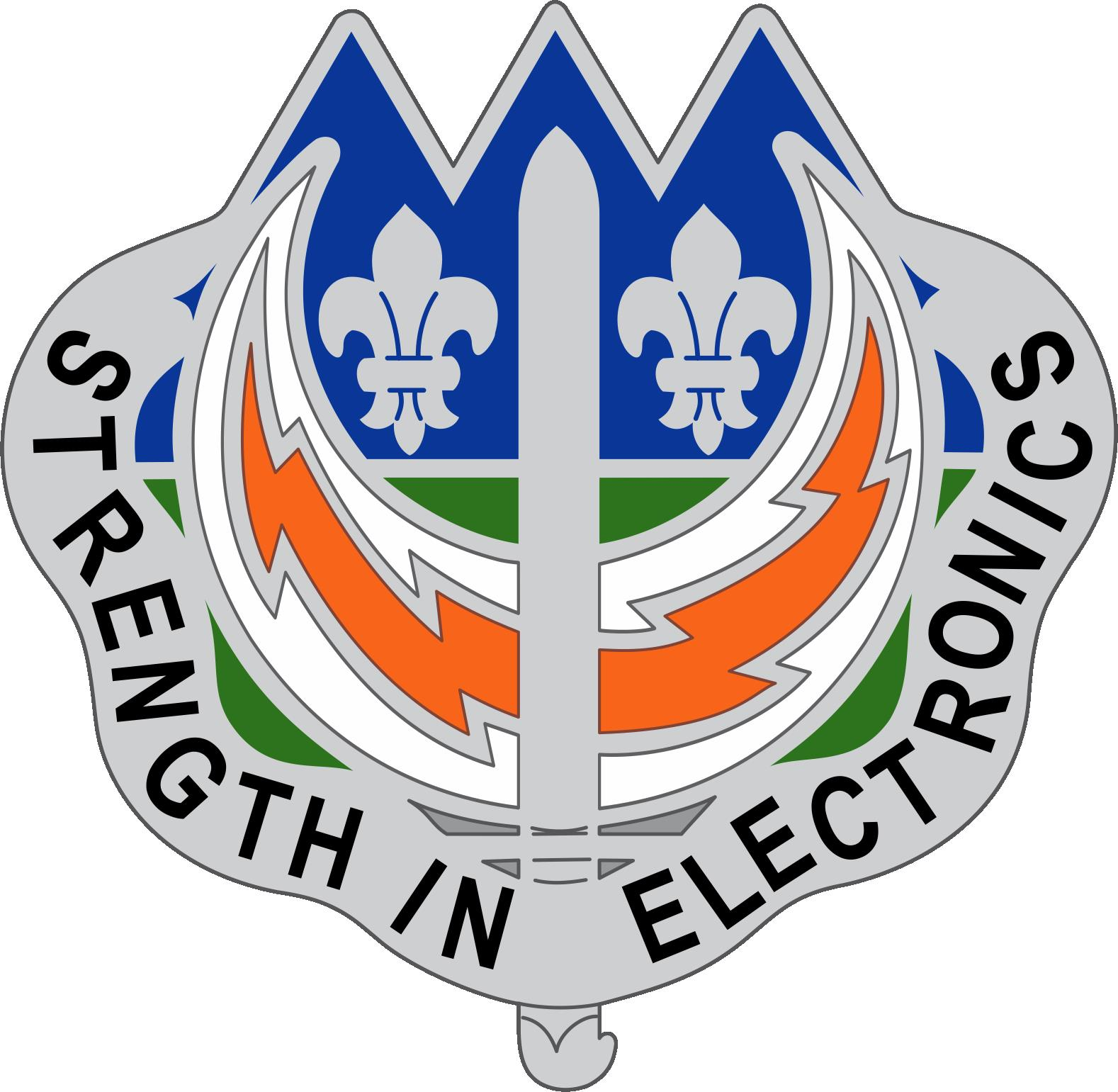
- 228th Signal Brigade DUI

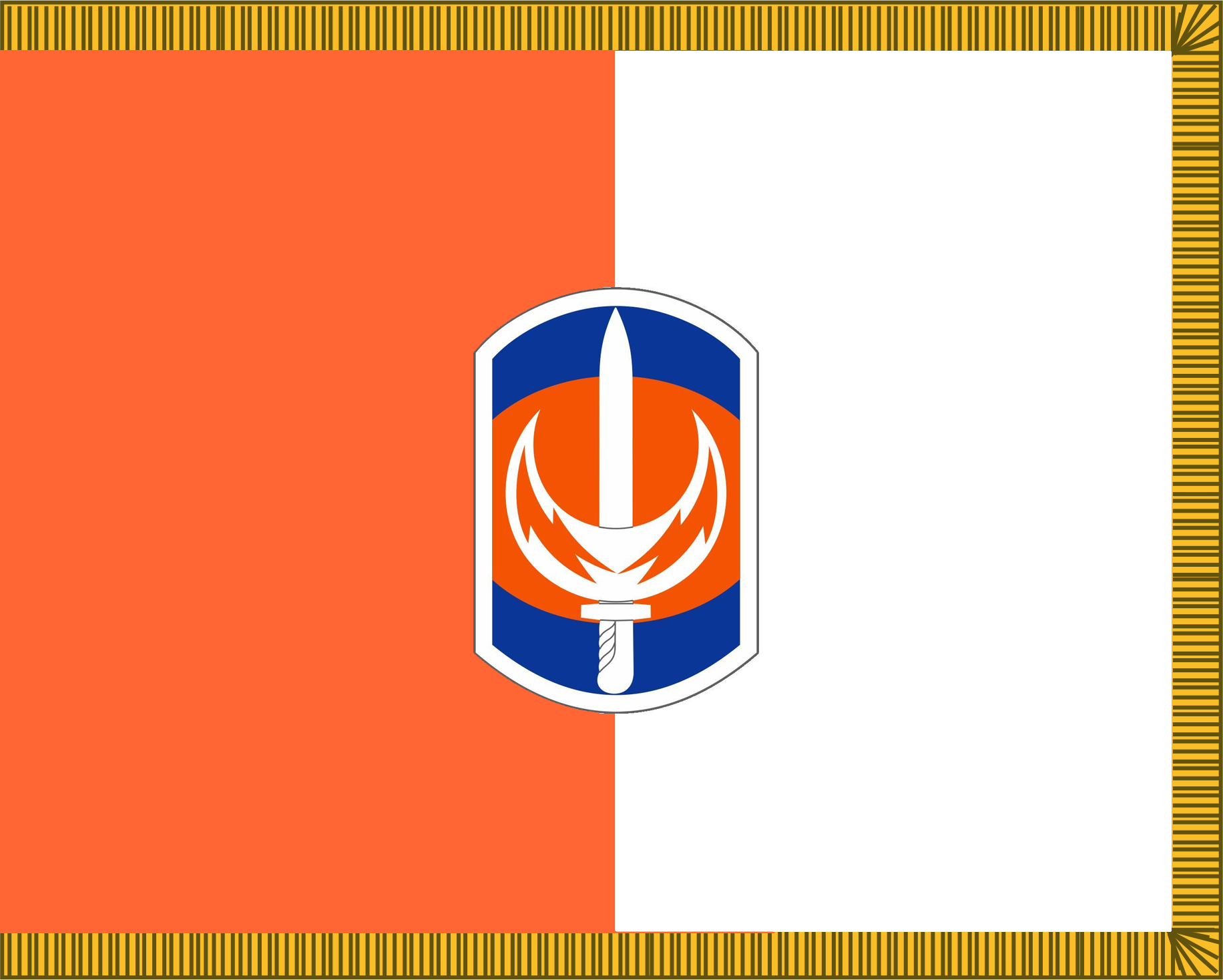
- 228th Signal Brigade Flag

The 228th Theater Tactical Signal Brigade is a unit of the South Carolina Army National Guard. The 228 Signal was raised in 1907 as I Company (Hampton Guards), 1st Infantry Regiment. It was redesignated F Company and federalized in 1916. It was again redesignated in 1917 as F Company, 118th Infantry Regiment, 30th Infantry Division. It would earn three campaign streamers in World War I: Somme Offensive, Ypres-Lys and Flanders 1918. It would be demobilized in 1919. The company would be federalized again in 1940 and were sent to Iceland to relieve British troops and serve as the Iceland Base Command, then served as a training and support unit in the United Kingdom and in Continental Europe following the liberation of France earning two more battle streamers in World War II: Northern France and Rhineland. It would be mustered out in 1946 at Camp Kilmer, New Jersey.

In 1947, it was reorganized again as HHC, 218th Infantry Regiment, 51st Infantry Division. In 1959, it was redesignated as HHC, 151st Transportation Battalion, 51st Infantry Division and again in 1963 as HHC, 51st Quartermaster Battalion.

In 1968 it would have its final reorganization as 228th Signal Group and renamed 228th Signal Brigade in 1980.

== Organization ==
- 228th Signal Brigade, in Spartanburg
  - Headquarters and Headquarters Company, 228th Signal Brigade, in Spartanburg
  - Company B, 198th Signal Battalion, in Newberry
  - 125th Cyber Protection Battalion, at McEntire Joint National Guard Base — (part of 91st Cyber Brigade
    - Headquarters and Headquarters Company, 125th Cyber Protection Battalion, at McEntire Joint National Guard Base
    - 135th Cyber Security Company, at McEntire Joint National Guard Base
    - 145th Cyber Warfare Company, at McEntire Joint National Guard Base
  - 151st Signal Battalion, in Greenville
    - Headquarters and Headquarters Company, 151st Signal Battalion, in Greenville
    - Company A, 151st Signal Battalion, in Greenwood
    - Company B, 151st Signal Battalion, in Hodges
    - Company C, 151st Signal Battalion, in Camden
    - 116th Signal Company (Tactical Installation/Networking), in Spartanburg
