= Roy V. McCarty =

United States Army general

Roy Van McCarty
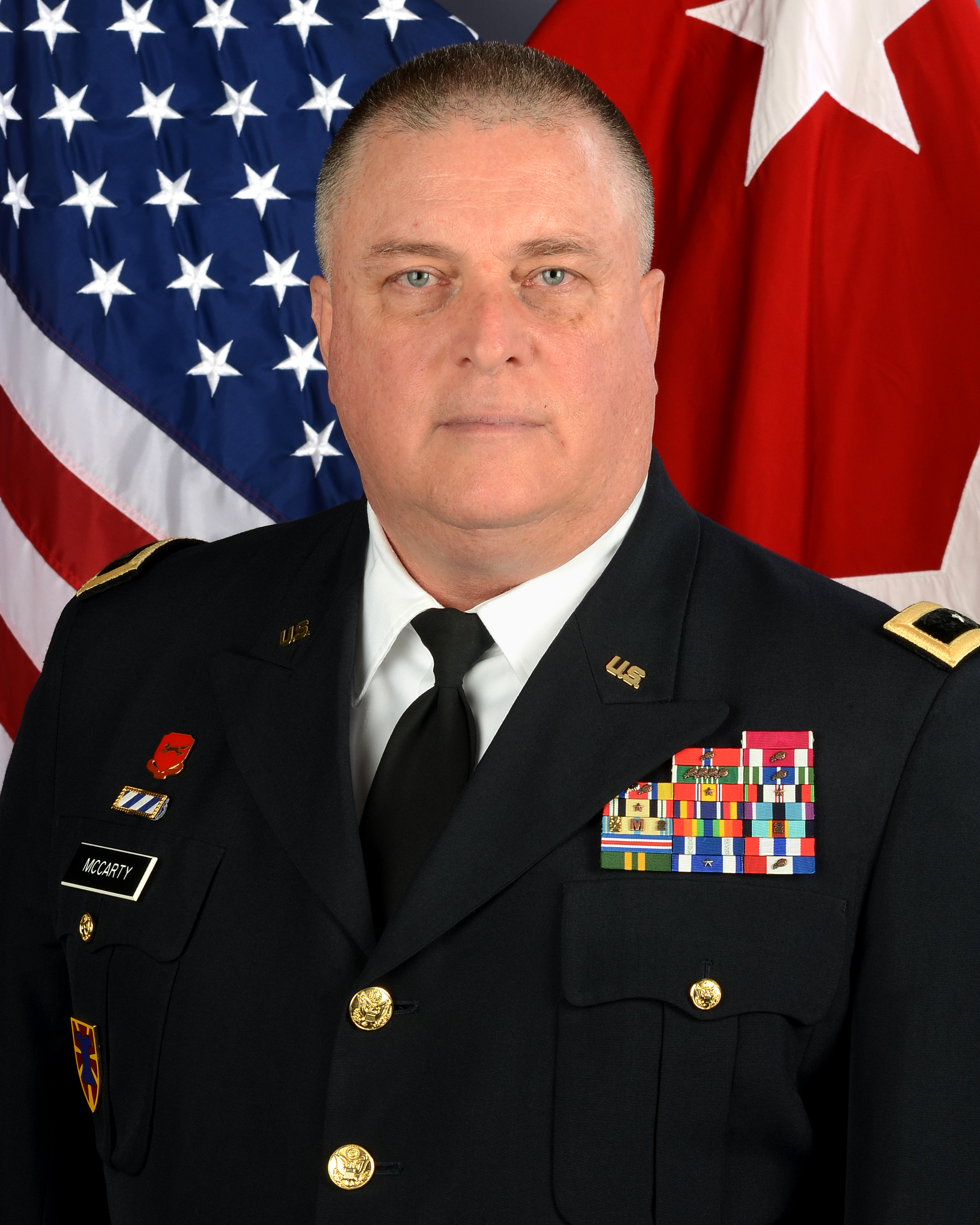
- Born: Saluda, South Carolina
- Allegiance: United States
- Branch: United States Army; South Carolina Army National Guard
- Service years: 1982–2025
- Rank: Major general
- Commands: South Carolina National Guard; 59th Troop Command; Headquarters Battery, 151st Field Artillery Brigade; Headquarters Battery, 1st Battalion, 178th Field Artillery Regiment; Battery A, 4th Battalion, 178th Field Artillery Regiment
- Conflicts: Operation Iraqi Freedom; Operation Enduring Freedom
- Awards: Legion of Merit; Bronze Star Medal with Oak Leaf Cluster

Major General Roy Van McCarty is a retired officer in the South Carolina Army National Guard who last served as South Carolina Adjutant General, he was appointed to the position by Governor Henry McMaster on January 17, 2019. As the state's senior military officer, he served as commander of the South Carolina Military Department which includes the South Carolina Army National Guard, South Carolina Air National Guard, South Carolina State Guard and the Emergency Management Division; he also advised the governor of the state on military matters.

== Early life and education ==
A native of Saluda, South Carolina he received a Bachelor of Science degree in education from The Citadel in 1982. He is also a graduate of the Field Artillery Officer Advanced Course, United States Army Command and General Staff College, Senior Reserve Component Officer Course and the Senior Service Fellowship at Old Dominion University.

== Military career ==
Upon graduation from The Citadel McCarty was commissioned as a field artillery officer into the United States Army serving for 5 years with the 24th Infantry Division at Fort Stewart, Georgia; after spending a year with the United States Army Reserve in St. Louis, he joined the South Carolina Army National Guard in 1986 and was assigned to the 178th Field Artillery Regiment at Andrews, South Carolina. He then served as a forward observer, battery commander, battalion assistant training officer and headquarters company commander. Moving to the 151st Field Artillery Brigade at Sumter, South Carolina, he was a fire control officer, battery operations officer and headquarters battery commander and also served as an operations officer with the 178th Field Artillery Brigade deploying to Operation Iraqi Freedom. He was subsequently a logistics officer and plans, operations and training officer with the 59th Troop Command in Columbia, South Carolina. Returning to the 151st in 2007, he served as a headquarters and headquarters battery commander deploying to Operation Enduring Freedom. In Afghanistan, he was a battalion commander and regional police advisory commander. Promoted to colonel, he was elevated to deputy commander of the 59th Troop Command. Then, he moved to a position as air defense artillery officer with the 263rd Army Air and Missile Command. He next was assigned as director of the Joint Staff for the Joint Force Headquarters of the South Carolina National Guard; promoted to brigadier general in 2012, he became commanding general of the 59th Troop Command. McCarty was elevated to assistant adjutant general – Army for the South Carolina National Guard in 2013 and was promoted to major general in 2017. McCarty succeeded Major General Robert Livingston, who was elected adjutant general in 2011; a change in state law in 2014 made the position an appointee of the governor.

=== Operational deployments ===
McCarty has deployed for two military operations, including:

- Operation Iraqi Freedom, Iraq
- Operation Enduring Freedom, Afghanistan

=== Service Summary ===
==== Dates of Rank ====
Promotions
| Insignia | Date |
|---|---|
| Second lieutenant | May 14, 1982 |
| First lieutenant | November 7, 1986 |
| Captain | May 18, 1988 |
| Major | July 15, 1997 |
| Lieutenant colonel | April 30, 2003 |
| Colonel | June 28, 2007 |
| Brigadier general | August 10, 2012 |
| Major general | February 2, 2017 |

== Civilian career ==
In civilian life, General McCarty served for 24 years in the Law Enforcement Division of the South Carolina Department of Natural Resources and is a graduate of the FBI National Academy.

== Awards ==
His military awards include the Legion of Merit and Bronze Star Medal with Oak Leaf Cluster.
