= South Carolina Army National Guard =

Component of the US Army and military of the U.S. state of South Carolina

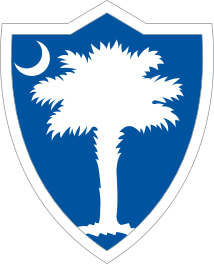
- Shoulder Sleeve Insignia (SSI)
- Country: United States
- Allegiance: South Carolina
- Branch: Army National Guard
- Type: ARNG Headquarters Command
- Role: Military reserve force
- Size: 9,253
- Part of: South Carolina National Guard
- Garrison/HQ: Columbia, South Carolina

Commanders
- Commander-in-chief: Governor Henry McMaster
- Adjutant General of South Carolina: Major General Roy V. McCarty

Insignia
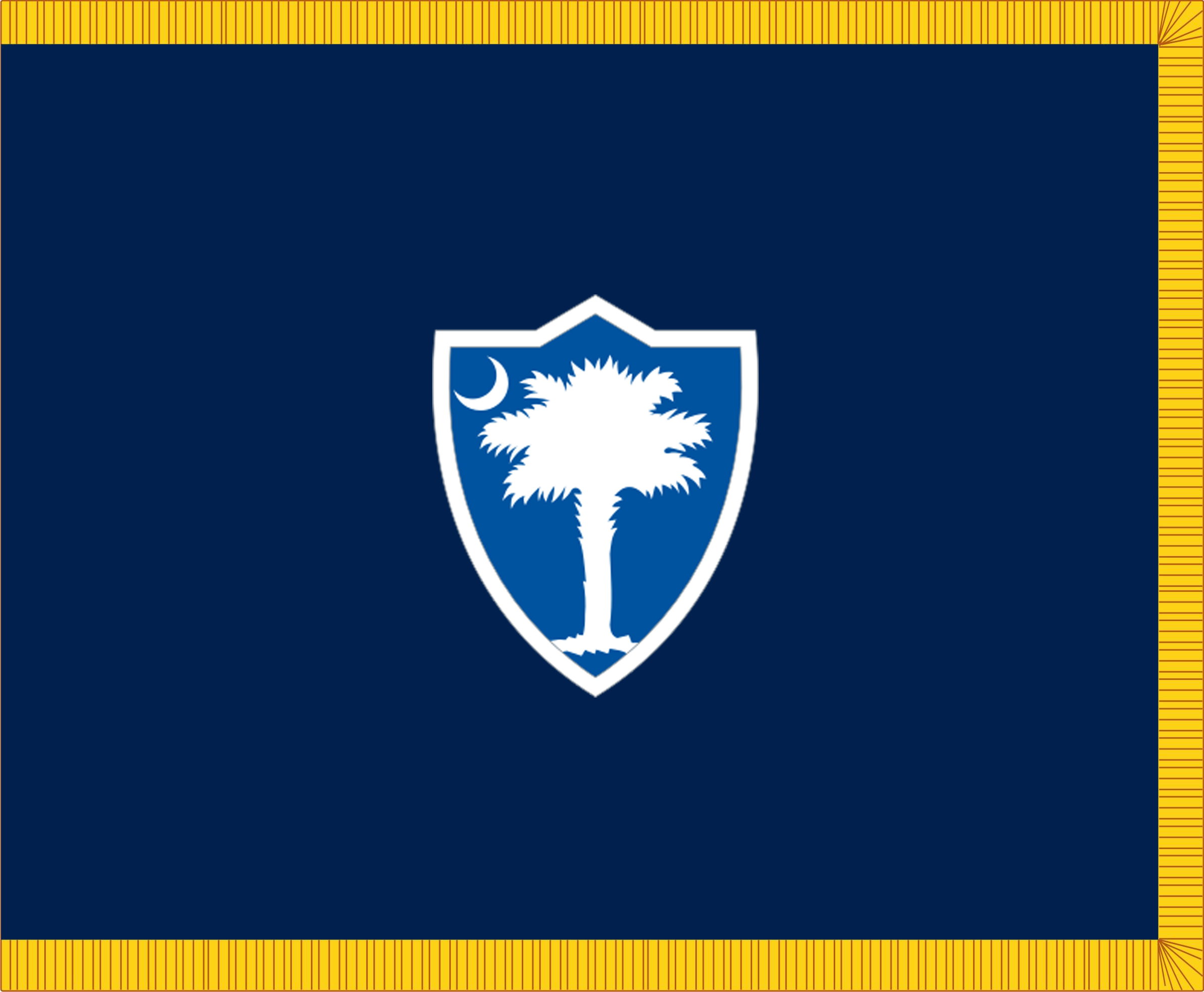
- South Carolina Army National Guard Headquarters Flag

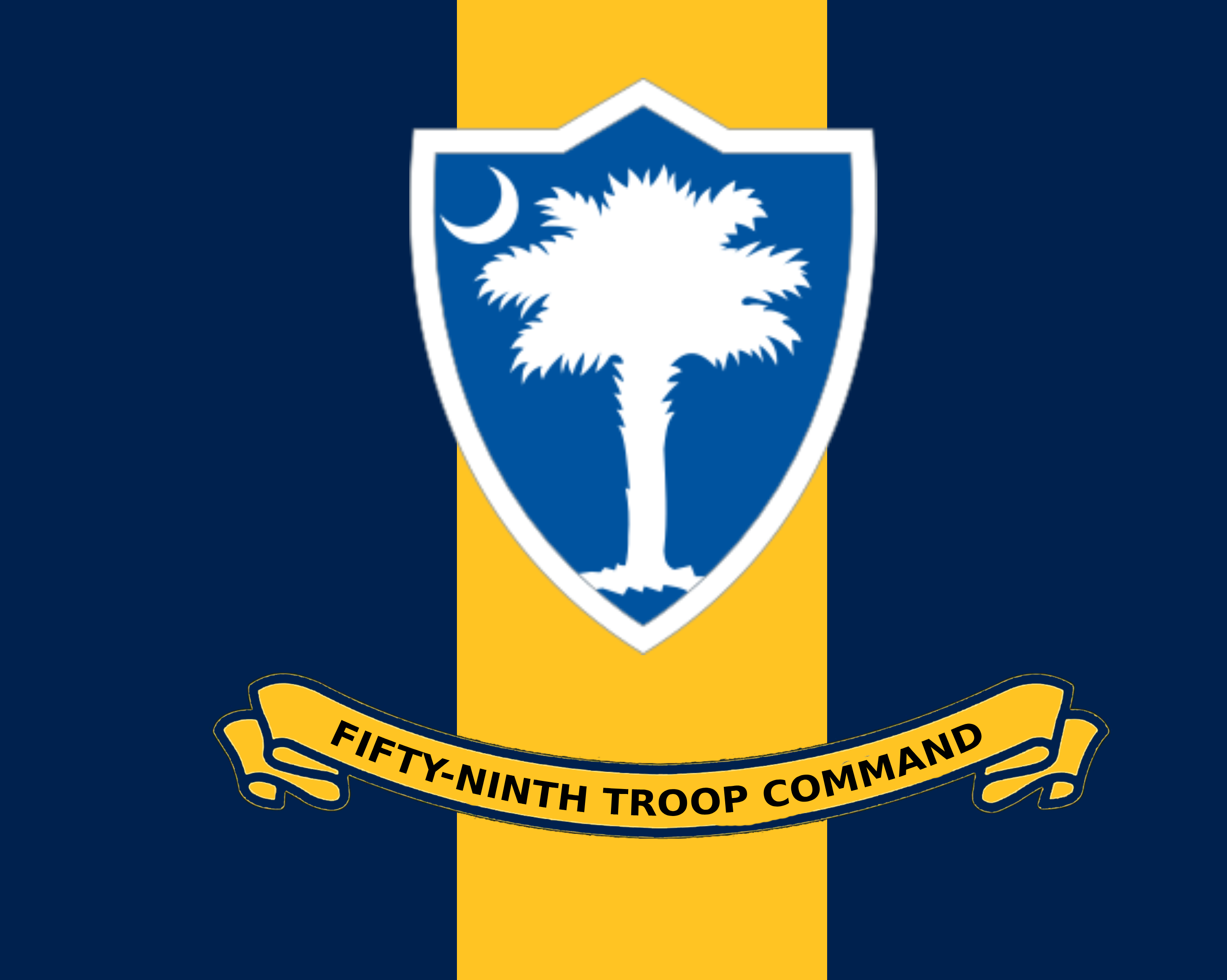
- South Carolina Army National Guard 59th Troop Command Flag

- South Carolina Army National Guard Crest

The South Carolina Army National Guard is a component of the United States Army and the United States National Guard. Nationwide, the Army National Guard comprises approximately one half of the U.S. Army's available combat forces and approximately one third of its support organization. National coordination of various state National Guard units is maintained through the National Guard Bureau.

South Carolina Army National Guard units are trained and equipped as part of the United States Army. The same ranks and insignia are used and National Guardsmen are eligible to receive all United States military awards. The South Carolina Guard also bestows a number of state awards for local services rendered in or to the state of South Carolina.

The South Carolina Army National Guard is composed of approximately 10,000 soldiers (as of February 2009) and maintains 80 facilities across the state with over 2 million square feet (180,000 m^{2}) of space.

== Organization ==
- Joint Force Headquarters-South Carolina, Army Element, in Columbia
  - Headquarters and Headquarters Detachment, Joint Force Headquarters-South Carolina, Army Element, in Columbia
  - South Carolina Recruiting & Retention Battalion, in Columbia
    - Company A, South Carolina Recruiting & Retention Battalion, in Greenville
      - Detachment 1, Company A, South Carolina Recruiting & Retention Battalion, in Spartanburg
      - Detachment 2, Company A, South Carolina Recruiting & Retention Battalion, in Anderson
    - Company B, South Carolina Recruiting & Retention Battalion, in West Columbia
      - Detachment 1, Company B, South Carolina Recruiting & Retention Battalion, in Hartsville
      - Detachment 2, Company B, South Carolina Recruiting & Retention Battalion, in West Columbia
    - Company C, South Carolina Recruiting & Retention Battalion, in Charleston
      - Detachment 1, Company C, South Carolina Recruiting & Retention Battalion, in Walterboro
      - Detachment 2, Company C, South Carolina Recruiting & Retention Battalion, in Conway
  - South Carolina Medical Detachment, at McEntire Joint National Guard Base
    - 251st Medical Company (Area Support), in Darlington
  - 43rd Civil Support Team (WMD), in Pine Ridge
  - 59th Chaplain Detachment, in Columbia
  - 108th Public Affairs Detachment, in Columbia
  - 246th Army Band, at McEntire Joint National Guard Base
  - 1051st Judge Advocate General Detachment, at McEntire Joint National Guard Base
  - 1810th Judge Advocate General Trial Defense Team, at McEntire Joint National Guard Base
  - 1980th Support Detachment (Contracting Team), in Columbia
  - McCrady Training Center, in Eastover
  - Army Aviation Support Facility #1, at McEntire Joint National Guard Base
  - Army Aviation Support Facility #2, at Donaldson Center Airport
  - Army Aviation Operations Facility #1, at Columbia Airport
  - Unit Training Equipment Site #1, at McCrady Training Center
  - Combined Support Maintenance Shop #1, at McEntire Joint National Guard Base
  - Field Maintenance Shop #1, in Greenville
  - Field Maintenance Shop #3, in Hemingway
  - Field Maintenance Shop #5, in Rock Hill
  - Field Maintenance Shop #6, in Edgefield
  - Field Maintenance Shop #6a, in Saluda
  - Field Maintenance Shop #8, in Union
  - Field Maintenance Shop #11, in Hartsville
  - Field Maintenance Shop #12, in Darlington
  - Field Maintenance Shop #13, in Summerville
  - Field Maintenance Shop #14, in Varnville
  - 59th Aviation Troop Command, at McEntire Joint National Guard Base
    - Headquarters and Headquarters Company, 59th Troop Command Battalion, at McEntire Joint National Guard Base
    - Detachment 5, Company B, 2nd Battalion (Fixed Wing), 641st Aviation Regiment (Detachment 24, Operational Support Airlift Activity), at Columbia Airport (C-26E Metroliner)
    - 1st Battalion (Attack Reconnaissance), 151st Aviation Regiment, at McEntire Joint National Guard Base (part of 34th Combat Aviation Brigade)
      - Headquarters and Headquarters Company, 1st Battalion (Attack Reconnaissance), 151st Aviation Regiment, at McEntire Joint National Guard Base
      - Company A, 1st Battalion (Attack Reconnaissance), 151st Aviation Regiment, at McEntire Joint National Guard Base (AH-64E Apache)
      - Company B, 1st Battalion (Attack Reconnaissance), 151st Aviation Regiment, at McEntire Joint National Guard Base (AH-64E Apache)
      - Company C, 1st Battalion (Attack Reconnaissance), 151st Aviation Regiment, at McEntire Joint National Guard Base (AH-64E Apache)
      - Company D (AVUM), 1st Battalion (Attack Reconnaissance), 151st Aviation Regiment, at McEntire Joint National Guard Base
      - Company E (Forward Support), 1st Battalion (Attack Reconnaissance), 151st Aviation Regiment, at McEntire Joint National Guard Base
      - Company A (CAC), 1st Battalion (General Support Aviation), 111th Aviation Regiment, at McEntire Joint National Guard Base (UH-60L Black Hawk)
        - Detachment 1, Headquarters and Headquarters Company, 1st Battalion (General Support Aviation), 111th Aviation Regiment, at McEntire Joint National Guard Base
        - Detachment 1, Company D (AVUM), 1st Battalion (General Support Aviation), 111th Aviation Regiment, at McEntire Joint National Guard Base
        - Detachment 1, Company E (Forward Support), 1st Battalion (General Support Aviation), 111th Aviation Regiment, at McEntire Joint National Guard Base
      - Detachment 2, Company C (MEDEVAC), 2nd Battalion (General Support Aviation), 238th Aviation Regiment, at McEntire Joint National Guard Base (HH-60L Black Hawk)
      - Detachment 1, Company B (AVIM), 642nd Aviation Support Battalion, at McEntire Joint National Guard Base
    - 2nd Battalion (Security & Support), 151st Aviation Regiment, at Donaldson Center Airport (part of 38th Combat Aviation Brigade)
      - Headquarters and Headquarters Company, 2nd Battalion (Security & Support), 151st Aviation Regiment, at Donaldson Center Airport
      - Company A, 2nd Battalion (Security & Support), 151st Aviation Regiment, at Donaldson Center Airport (UH-72A Lakota)
      - Detachment 1, Company B (Heavy Lift), 2nd Battalion (General Support Aviation), 238th Aviation Regiment, at Donaldson Center Airport (CH-47F Chinook)
        - Detachment 2, Headquarters and Headquarters Company, 2nd Battalion (General Support Aviation), 238th Aviation Regiment, at Donaldson Center Airport
        - Detachment 3, Company D (AVUM), 2nd Battalion (General Support Aviation), 238th Aviation Regiment, at Donaldson Center Airport
        - Detachment 3, Company E (Forward Support), 2nd Battalion (General Support Aviation), 238th Aviation Regiment, at Donaldson Center Airport
    - 351st Aviation Support Battalion, in Sumter
      - Headquarters Support Company, 351st Aviation Support Battalion, in Sumter
      - Company A (Distribution), 351st Aviation Support Battalion, in Hartsville
      - Company B (AVIM), 351st Aviation Support Battalion, at Capital City Airport (KY) — (Kentucky Army National Guard)
        - Detachment 1, Company B (AVIM), 351st Aviation Support Battalion, at Gray Army Airfield (WA) — (Washington Army National Guard)
        - Detachment 2, Company B (AVIM), 351st Aviation Support Battalion, at Abrams Airport (MI) — (Michigan Army National Guard)
        - Detachment 3, Company B (AVIM), 351st Aviation Support Battalion, at Pendleton Army Airfield (OR) — (Oregon Army National Guard)
        - Detachment 6, Company B (AVIM), 351st Aviation Support Battalion, at Selfridge Air National Guard Base (MI) — (Michigan Army National Guard)
  - 59th Troop Command, at McEntire Joint National Guard Base
    - Headquarters and Headquarters Company, 59th Troop Command Battalion, at McEntire Joint National Guard Base
    - 51st Military Police Battalion, in Florence
      - Headquarters and Headquarters Detachment, 51st Military Police Battalion, in Florence
      - 132nd Military Police Company (Combat Support), in West Columbia
      - 133rd Military Police Company (Combat Support), in Timmonsville
    - 751st Combat Sustainment Support Battalion, at McEntire Joint National Guard Base
      - Headquarters and Headquarters Company, 751st Combat Sustainment Support Battalion, at McEntire Joint National Guard Base
      - 741st Quartermaster Company (Water Purification and Distribution), in Allendale
        - Detachment 1, 741st Quartermaster Company (Water Purification and Distribution), in Barnwell
      - 742nd Ordnance Company (Support Maintenance), at McEntire Joint National Guard Base
        - Detachment 1, 742nd Ordnance Company (Support Maintenance), at McCrady Training Center
      - 748th Quartermaster Company (Field Feeding), in Orangeburg
      - 3648th Ordnance Company (Support Maintenance), in Orangeburg
    - 1050th Transportation Battalion (Motor), in Varnville
      - Headquarters and Headquarters Detachment, 1050th Transportation Battalion (Motor), in Varnville
      - 1051st Transportation Company (Light-Medium Truck), in Beaufort
        - Detachment 1, 1051st Transportation Company (Light-Medium Truck), in Varnville
      - 1052nd Transportation Company (Medium Truck) (Cargo), in Kingstree
      - 1053rd Transportation Company (Light-Medium Truck), in Bennettsville
      - 1055th Transportation Company (Medium Truck) (Cargo), in Laurens
  - 117th Engineer Brigade, in Newberry
    - Headquarters and Headquarters Company, 117th Engineer Brigade, in Newberry
    - 710th Engineer Detachment (Explosive Hazards Coordination Cell), in Conway
    - 122nd Engineer Battalion, in Edgefield
      - Headquarters and Headquarters Company, 122nd Engineer Battalion, in Edgefield
      - Forward Support Company, 122nd Engineer Battalion, in Edgefield
      - 124th Engineer Company (Mobility Augmentation Company), in Saluda
      - 125th Engineer Company (Multirole Bridge), in Abbeville
        - Detachment 1, 125th Engineer Company (Multirole Bridge), in Clarks Hill
      - 1221st Engineer Company (Clearance), in Graniteville
      - 1220th Engineer Platoon (Area Clearance), in Batesburg
      - 1226th Engineer Detachment (Asphalt), in Batesburg
      - 1227th Engineer Detachment (Concrete Section), in Batesburg
    - 178th Engineer Battalion, in Rock Hill
      - Headquarters and Headquarters Company, 178th Engineer Battalion, in Rock Hill
      - Forward Support Company, 178th Engineer Battalion, in Rock Hill
      - 174th Combat Engineer Company Armored (CEC-A), in Wellford
      - 679th Engineer Detachment (Utilities), in Chester
      - 1222nd Engineer Company (Combat Engineer Company — Infantry) (CEC-I), in Fort Mill
      - 1223rd Engineer Company (Vertical Construction Company), in Walterboro
      - 1782nd Engineer Company (Engineer Construction Company), in Lancaster
      - 264th Engineer Detachment (Fire Fighting Team — HQ), at McCrady Training Center
      - 265th Engineer Detachment (Fire Fighting Team — Fire Truck), at McCrady Training Center
      - 266th Engineer Detachment (Fire Fighting Team — Fire Truck), at McCrady Training Center
      - 267th Engineer Detachment (Fire Fighting Team — Fire Truck), at McCrady Training Center
      - 268th Engineer Detachment (Fire Fighting Team — Fire Truck), at McCrady Training Center
  - 218th Maneuver Enhancement Brigade, in Charleston
    - Headquarters Support Company, 218th Maneuver Enhancement Brigade, in Charleston
    - 108th Chemical Company, at Joint Base Charleston
    - 111th Signal Company, in Charleston
    - 1st Battalion, 118th Infantry Regiment, in Mount Pleasant (part of 37th Infantry Brigade Combat Team)
      - Headquarters and Headquarters Company, 1st Battalion, 118th Infantry Regiment, in Mount Pleasant
        - Detachment 1, Headquarters and Headquarters Battery, 1st Battalion, 134th Field Artillery Regiment, at McCrady Training Center
      - Company A, 1st Battalion, 118th Infantry Regiment, in Moncks Corner
      - Company B, 1st Battalion, 118th Infantry Regiment, at Joint Base Charleston
      - Company C, 1st Battalion, 118th Infantry Regiment, in Mullins
      - Company D (Weapons), 1st Battalion, 118th Infantry Regiment, in Marion
      - Company I (Forward Support), 237th Brigade Support Battalion, at Joint Base Charleston
    - 4th Battalion, 118th Infantry Regiment, in Union (part of 30th Armored Brigade Combat Team)
      - Headquarters and Headquarters Company, 4th Battalion, 118th Infantry Regiment, in Union
      - Company A (Tank), 4th Battalion, 118th Infantry Regiment, in Dillon
      - Company B (Tank), 4th Battalion, 118th Infantry Regiment, in Gaffney
      - Company C (Mechanized Infantry), 4th Battalion, 118th Infantry Regiment, in Fountain Inn
      - Company H (Forward Support), 230th Brigade Support Battalion, in Greer
  - 228th Signal Brigade, in Spartanburg
    - Headquarters and Headquarters Company, 228th Signal Brigade, in Spartanburg
    - Company B, 198th Signal Battalion, in Newberry
    - 125th Cyber Protection Battalion, at McEntire Joint National Guard Base — (part of 91st Cyber Brigade
      - Headquarters and Headquarters Company, 125th Cyber Protection Battalion, at McEntire Joint National Guard Base
      - 135th Cyber Security Company, at McEntire Joint National Guard Base
      - 145th Cyber Warfare Company, at McEntire Joint National Guard Base
    - 151st Signal Battalion, in Greenville
      - Headquarters and Headquarters Company, 151st Signal Battalion, in Greenville
      - Company A, 151st Signal Battalion, in Greenwood
      - Company B, 151st Signal Battalion, in Hodges
      - Company C, 151st Signal Battalion, in Camden
      - 116th Signal Company (Tactical Installation/Networking), in Spartanburg
  - 263rd Army Air and Missile Defense Command, in Anderson
    - Headquarters and Headquarters Battery, 263rd Army Air and Missile Defense Command, in Anderson
    - 678th Air Defense Artillery Brigade, at McEntire Joint National Guard Base
      - Headquarters and Headquarters Battery, 678th Air Defense Artillery Brigade, at McEntire Joint National Guard Base
      - 1st Battalion, 178th Field Artillery Regiment, in Georgetown (M109A6 Paladin)
        - Headquarters and Headquarters Battery, 1st Battalion, 178th Field Artillery Regiment, in Georgetown
        - Battery A, 1st Battalion, 178th Field Artillery Regiment, in Andrews
        - Battery B, 1st Battalion, 178th Field Artillery Regiment, in Clinton
        - Battery C, 1st Battalion, 178th Field Artillery Regiment, in Manning
        - 1178th Forward Support Company, in Hemingway
          - Detachment 1, 1178th Forward Support Company, in Myrtle Beach
      - 2nd Battalion, 263rd Air Defense Artillery Regiment, in Anderson (AN/TWQ-1 Avenger)
        - Headquarters and Headquarters Battery, 2nd Battalion, 263rd Air Defense Artillery Regiment, in Anderson
        - Battery A, 2nd Battalion, 263rd Air Defense Artillery Regiment, in Seneca
        - Battery B, 2nd Battalion, 263rd Air Defense Artillery Regiment, in Easley
        - Battery C, 2nd Battalion, 263rd Air Defense Artillery Regiment, in Clemson
        - Battery D, 2nd Battalion, 263rd Air Defense Artillery Regiment, in Clemson
  - 218th Regiment, Regional Training Institute, at McCrady Training Center
    - 1st Battalion (Engineer)
    - 2nd Battalion (Officer Candidate School / Warrant Officer Candidate School)
    - 3rd Battalion (NCO Academy)
    - 4th Battalion (Modular Training)
    - 5th Battalion (Signal)

Aviation unit abbreviations: CAC — Command Aviation Company; MEDEVAC — Medical evacuation; AVUM — Aviation Unit Maintenance; AVIM — Aviation Intermediate Maintenance

== Duties ==
National Guard units can be mobilized at any time by presidential order to supplement regular armed forces, and upon declaration of a state of emergency by the governor of the state in which they serve. Unlike Army Reserve members, National Guard members cannot be mobilized individually (except through voluntary transfers and Temporary DutY Assignments, TDY), but only as part of their respective units.

=== Active duty callups ===
For much of the final decades of the twentieth century, National Guard personnel typically served "One weekend a month, two weeks a year", with a portion working for the Guard in a full-time capacity. The current forces formation plans of the US Army call for the typical National Guard unit (or National Guardsman) to serve one year of active duty for every three years of service. More specifically, current Department of Defense policy is that no Guardsman will be involuntarily activated for a total of more than 24 months (cumulative) in one six-year enlistment period (this policy was due to change 1 August 2007; the new policy states that soldiers will be given 24 months between deployments of no more than 24 months; individual states have differing policies).

== History ==
The South Carolina Army National Guard was originally formed in 1670. The Militia Act of 1903 organized the various state militias into the present National Guard system.

The South Carolina National Guard's militia predecessors saw action in the Revolutionary War, War of 1812, Mexican War, American Civil War, and the Spanish–American War.

South Carolina's National Guard first served in their National Guard capacity on the Mexican Border during the Punitive Expedition of 1916–1917. With the United States entry into the First World War, the SCNG was federalized and several key units were composed of National Guard troops from the state. The 118th Infantry of the 30th Division and the 117th Engineers, along with the 105th Ammunition Train, 105th Sanitary Train, 30th Division Sanitary Detachment, and HQ Company of the 30th Division.

The 118th Infantry (formerly the 1st SC Infantry) formed one of the four infantry regiments that made up the 30th Division. The 30th trained at Camp Sevier outside Greenville, SC and was sent to France. The 118th, along with the rest of the division (minus the division's artillery regiment) fought under British Expeditionary Force command. The 30th alongside the 27th Division (the federalized NY National Guard) formed 2nd Corps. After further training with the British, the 30th Division was sent to Kemmel, Belgium (just south of Ypres), where the 118th got their first time in the trenches. Although relatively quiet, the 118th was able to learn a great deal from this experience. In preparation for the last great Allied Offensive, the division trained alongside tanks prior to being moved to the edge of the German Hindenburg Line. On 29 September, the 118th infantry in reserve supported the breaking of the Hindenburg Line by other units of the 30th Division near the French village of Bellicourt. Following this success, the division continued to fight a retreating, but not defeated German Army. They suffered heavy casualties to German artillery, gas, and machine gun fire. The 118th fought until 19 October, not seeing combat again prior to the Armistice. The 118th had six Medal of Honor recipients (two posthumous) in their ranks to include future SCNG Adjutant General James Dozier. Many more men of the regiment were awarded Distinguished Service Crosses and foreign awards for valor.

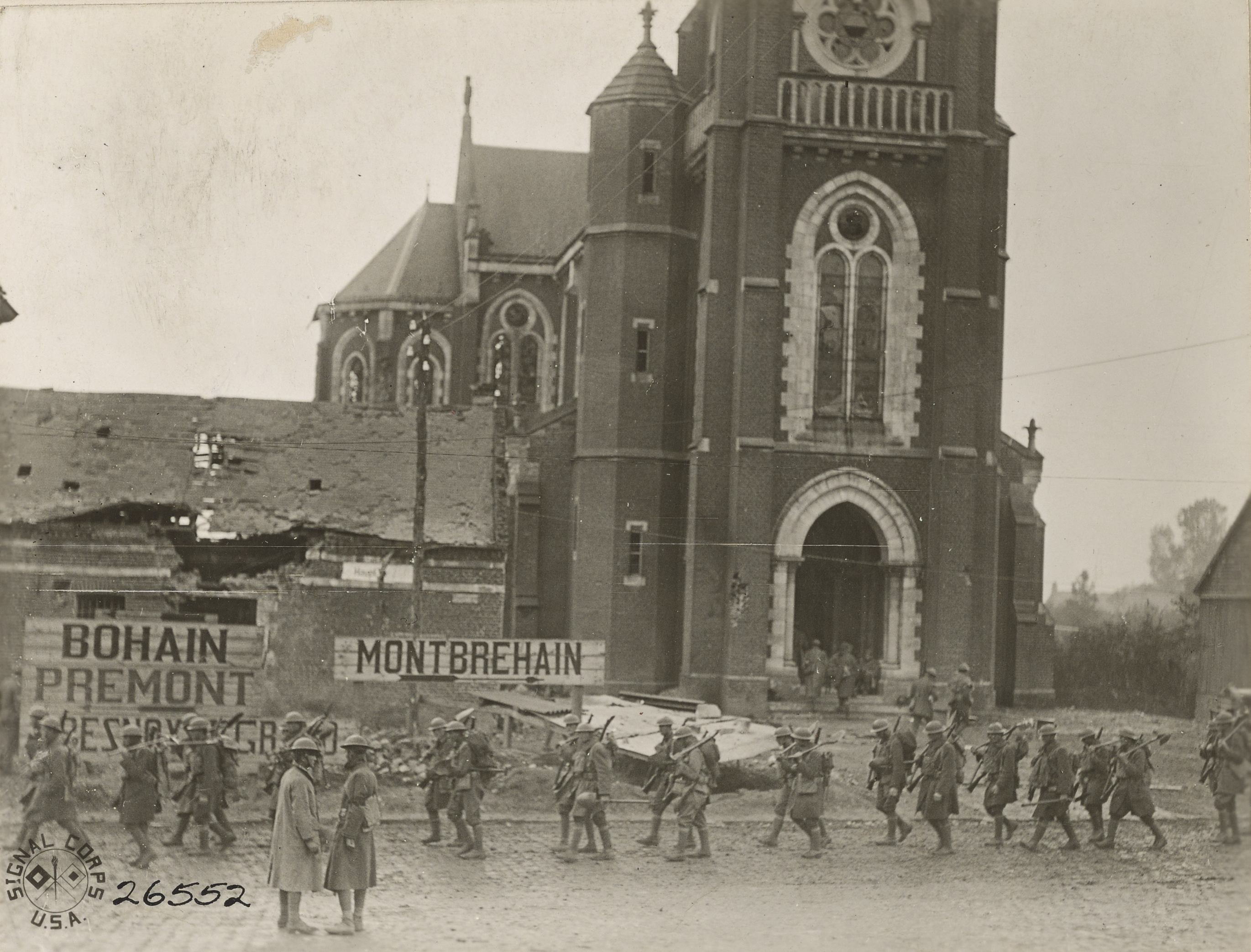
118th Infantry Regiment Burial Party Brancourt, France 11 Oct. 1918

The first battalion of the 117th Engineers were formed as part of the 42nd Infantry Division. They were joined with men from the California National Guard to create the 117th Engineers. The 42nd, known as the Rainbow Division, earned its name due to the efforts made to create a unit that encompassed men from around the country. The 117th Engineers were tasked with road construction, road repair, construction of shelters, construction and repair of trenches, wiring and cutting of barbed wire, establishing assault paths, and clearing of obstacles. They performed all of these duties in addition to standing in as infantry in several circumstances and policing the battlefield of human remains. They participated in four campaigns: the Champagne Marne, the Aisne Marne, the Saint Mihiel Offensive, and the Meuse Argonne. The 117th served with the 42nd Division through the Armistice.

The 118th Infantry was reactivated in World War Two. The regiment became a Separate Infantry Regiment as the Army restructured with only three, not four regiments making up an infantry division. For that reason, the 118th was not part of the 30th Division like they had been during the First World War. The 118th regiment was first deployed to Iceland. Their purpose was to defend the island nation and Allied assets, from the threat of German invasion. The 118th was eventually sent to England where individual companies served as cadre to train replacements and zero weapons. Elements of the 2nd Battalion protected bridges during the Battle of the Bulge.

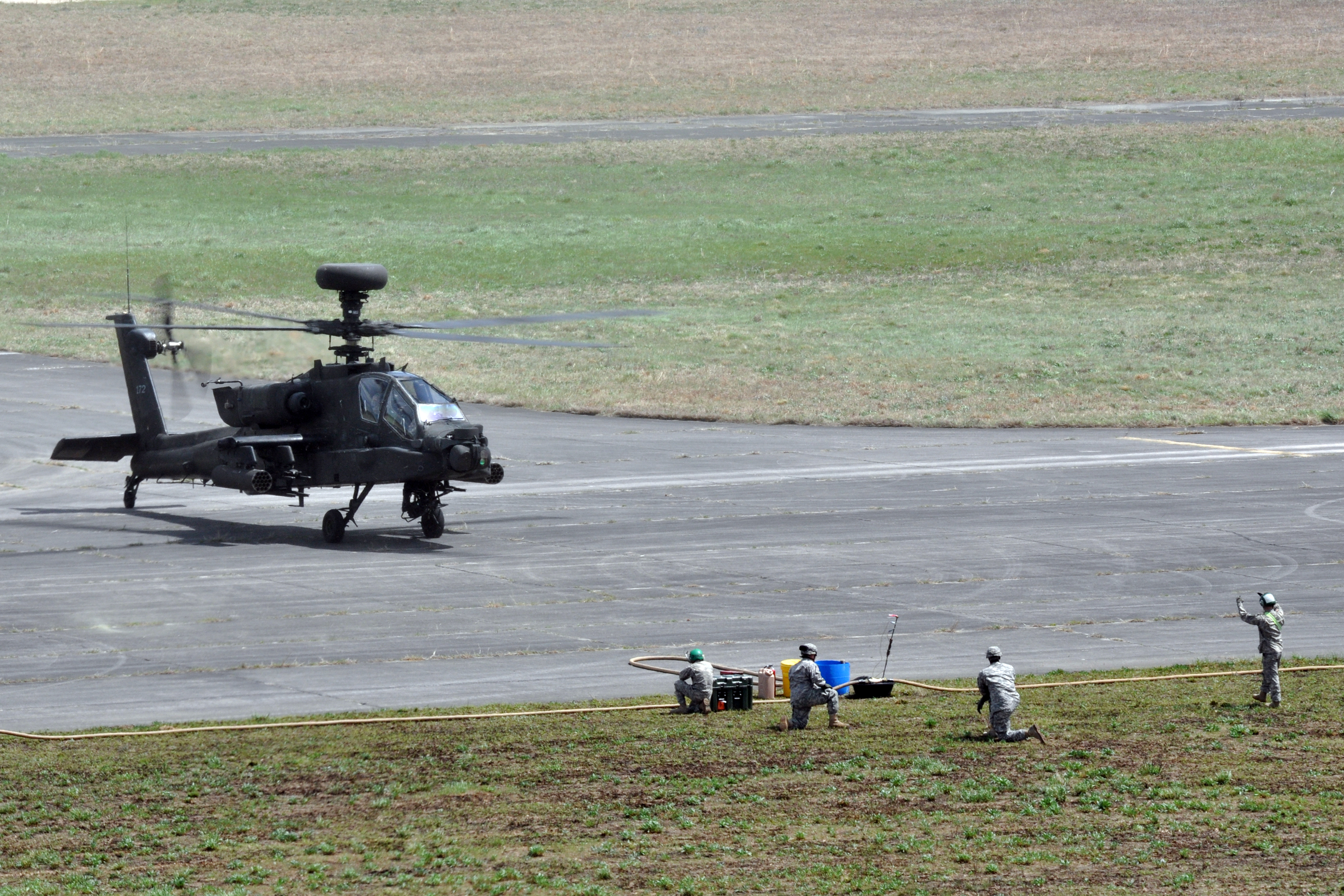
An AH-64 Apache of the 151st Aviation Regiment

South Carolina aviation troops and their AH-64 Apache attack helicopters were called to Kuwait as part of Operation Southern Watch between August 1999 and February 2000. As Task Force 151, commanded by LTC David Anderson, the Task Force was augmented by Mississippi and Minnesota Army National Guard units, along with individual personnel from the National Guards of New Hampshire, Arizona, and Washington state.

South Carolina's C Company, 1-151st Aviation was deployed to Kosovo under operational control of 1-104 AVN of the Pennsylvania ARNG (as were National Guard aviation units from Alabama and Nebraska) during KFOR 5A operations from July 2003 to February 2004.

Headquarters and Headquarters Company (HHC),along with A, B, D, and L Companies of the 1-151st Aviation were deployed as Task Force 1-151st Aviation during Operation Iraqi Freedom II & III from October 2004 to October 2005, where they gained fame flying their AH-64A Apaches in an experimental two-tone grey scheme in support of the 1st Stryker Brigade, 25th Infantry Division (Light), and then supported operations of the II Marine Expeditionary Force (II MEF) in Al-Anbar Province. Task Force 1-151 was augmented with National Guard personnel from Tennessee, Missouri, and Maryland and the Individual Ready Reserve of the Army. L Company, 1-151 was augmented with National Guard personnel from Idaho, Iowa, Kentucky, Ohio, and Wyoming, serving with distinction during OIF.

In the fall of 2008, a CH-47D Detachment, B Company, 2-238th Aviation was activated in support of OEF, and deployed to Afghanistan. Paired with Illinois National Guard, B Company was split between three different forward operating bases, Bagram, Kandahar/Shank, and Salerno, with each acting independently of the others. The detachment's main missions included resupply, troop movement, and air assaults on high-value targets. B Company, 2-238th Aviation returned home in fall of 2009 after serving with great distinction and perseverance during Operation Enduring Freedom II.

=== Historic units ===
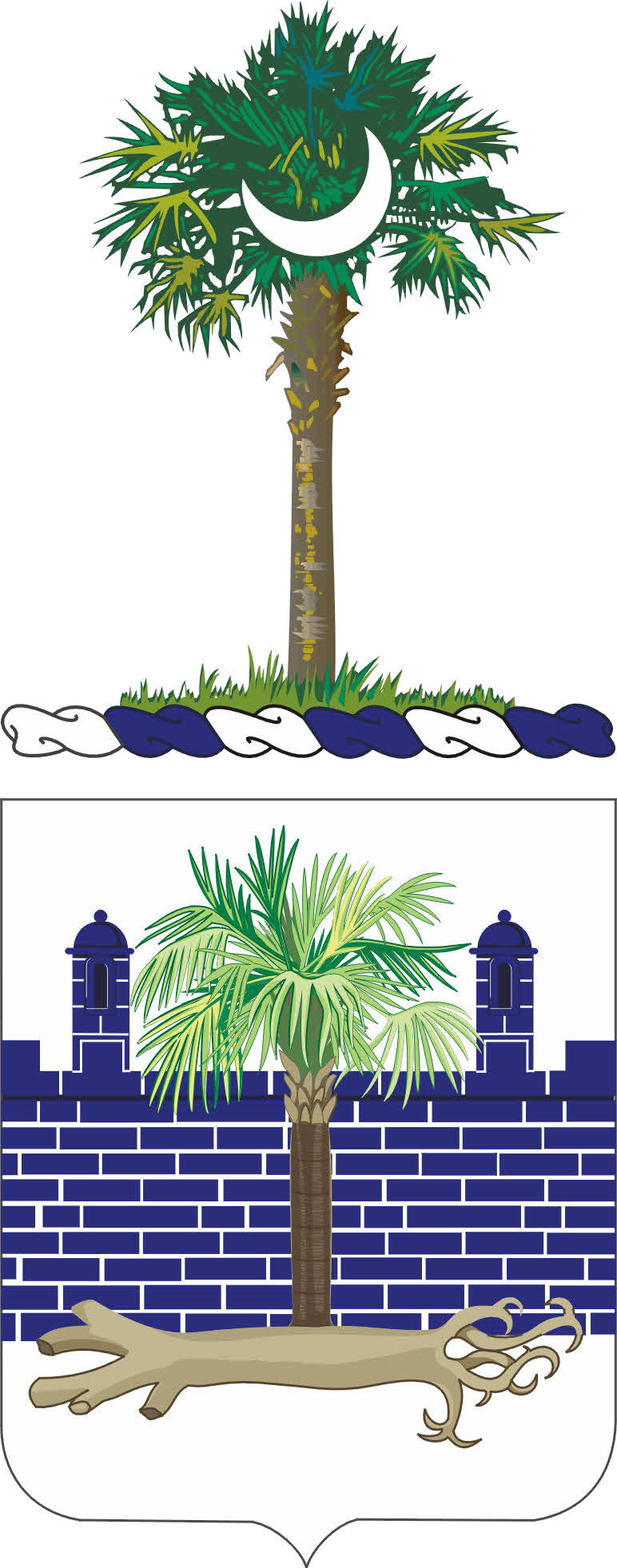
- 118th Infantry Regiment
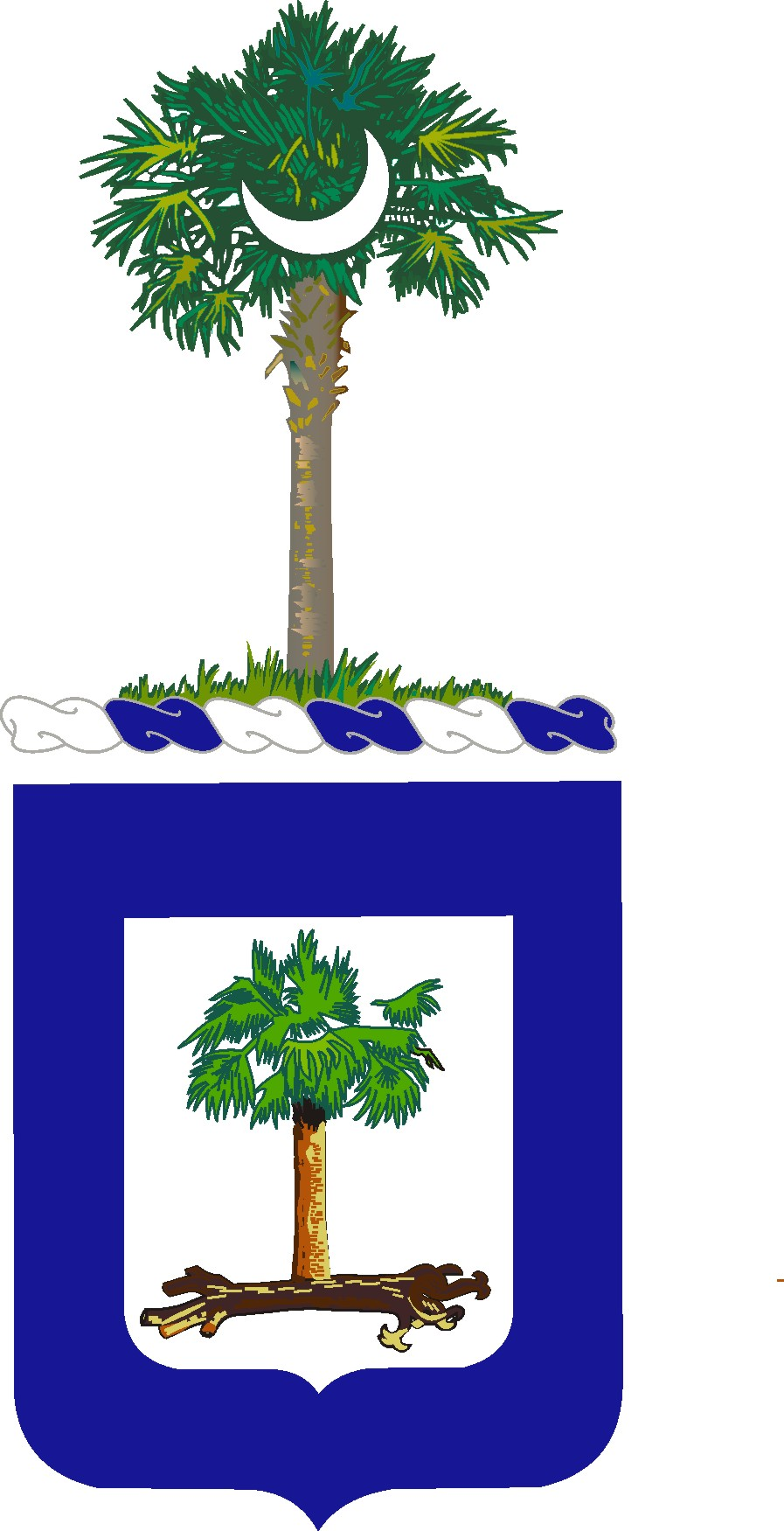
- 218th Infantry Regiment
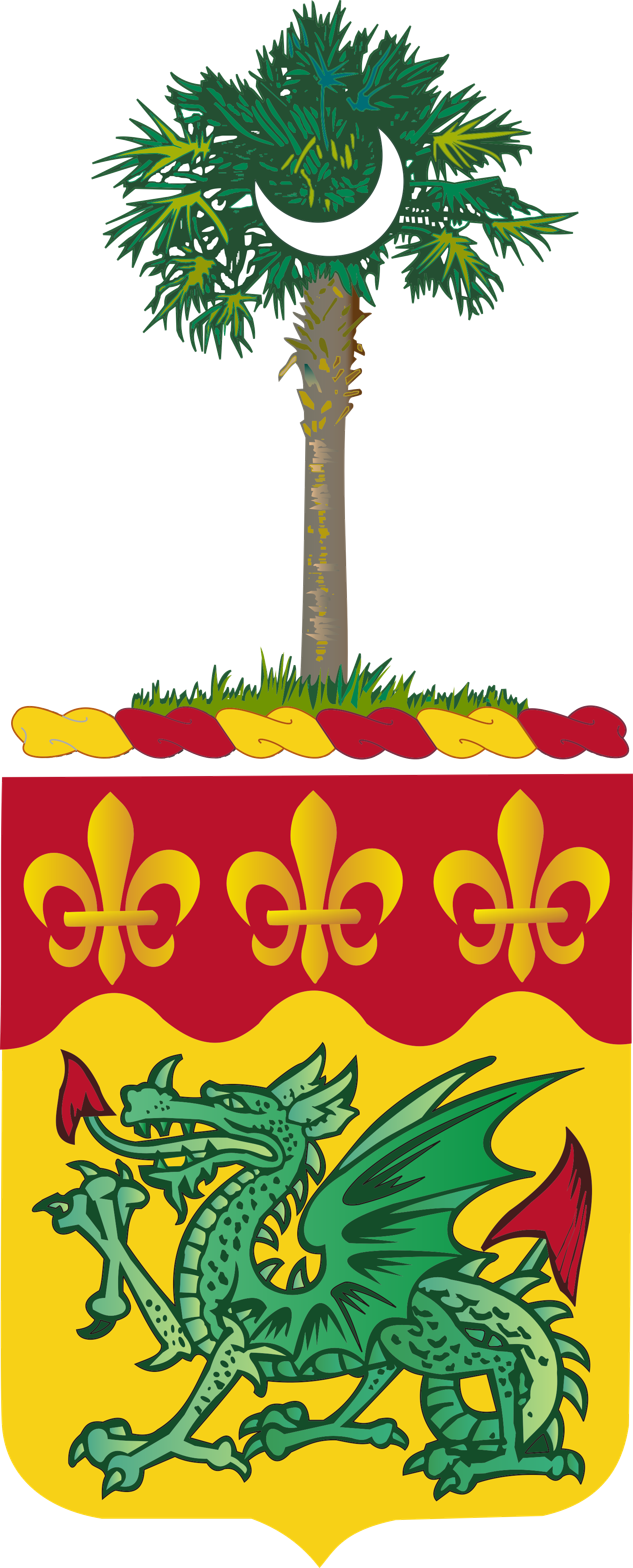
- 263rd Armor Regiment
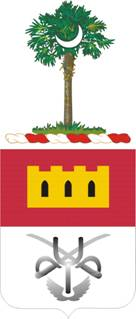
- 202nd Cavalry Regiment
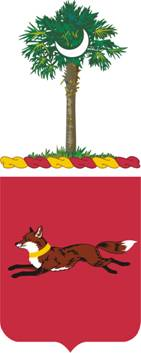
- 178th Field Artillery Regiment (178th FAR)
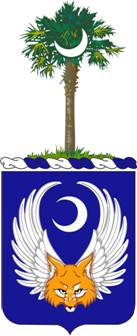
- 151st Aviation Regiment
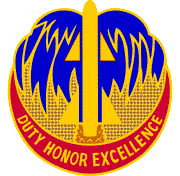
- 263rd Air Defense Artillery Brigade (263rd ADAB)

== See also ==
- 169th Fighter Wing
- Combat Aviation Brigade, 36th Infantry Division – approx. 15 SC ARNG soldiers deployed to Iraq in Sep 2006.
- South Carolina Naval Militia
- South Carolina State Guard
