= General McCarthy =

General McCarthy may refer to:

- Dennis M. McCarthy (born 1945), U.S. Marine Corps lieutenant general
- James P. McCarthy (born 1935), U.S. Air Force four-star general
- Michael J. McCarthy (general) (fl. 1960s–2000s), U.S. Air Force major general

== See also ==
- Chester E. McCarty (1905–1999), U.S. Air Force major general
- Roy V. McCarty (fl. 1980s–2020s), South Carolina Army National Guard major general
