= 218th Infantry Regiment =

American military unit

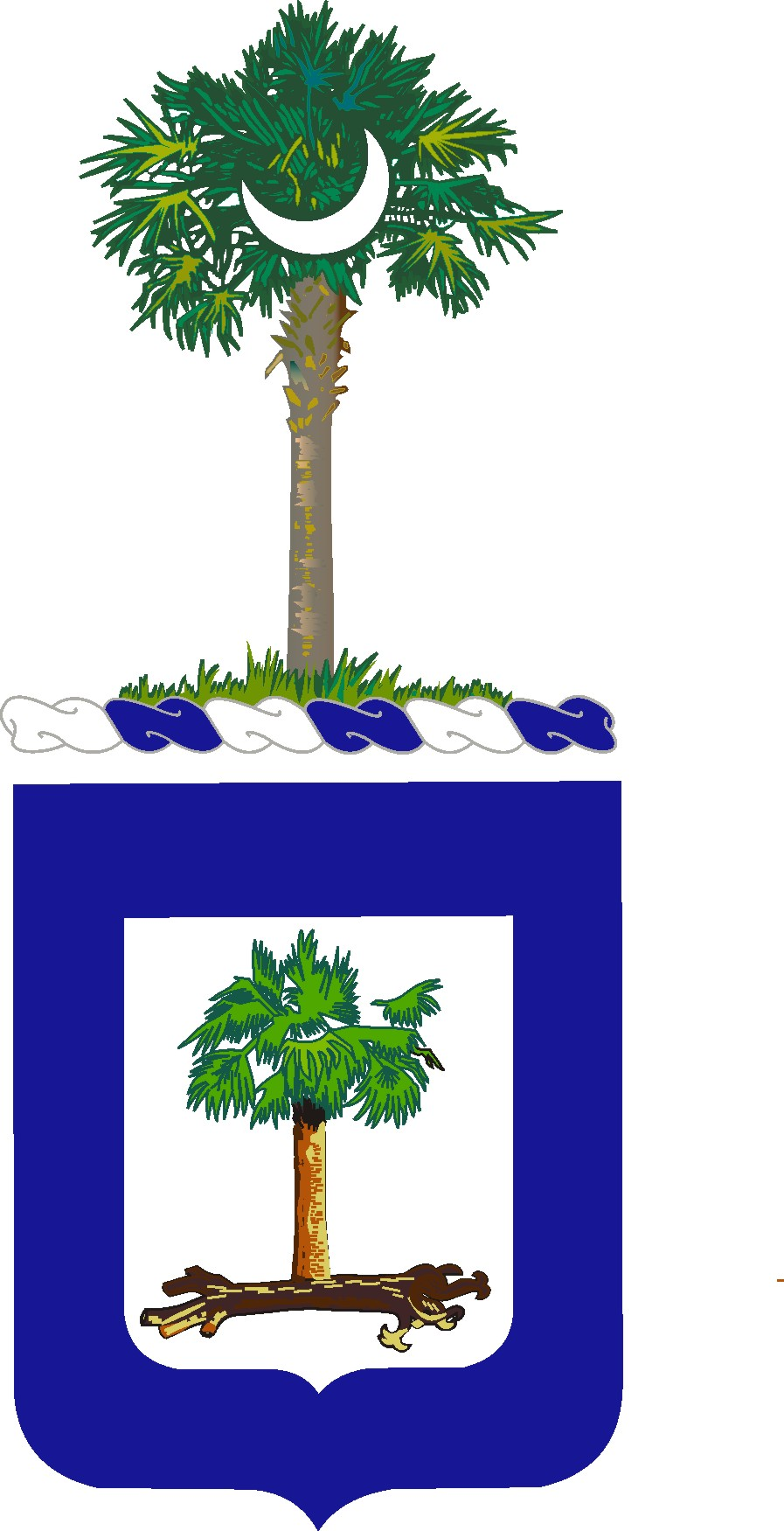
- Coat of arms
- Active: 1947–1959; 1997–present
- Country: United States
- Branch: South Carolina Army National Guard
- Type: Regional Training Institute
- Garrison/HQ: Columbia, South Carolina
- Motto: "Constans Animis" meaning "Steadfast of Purpose"

Insignia
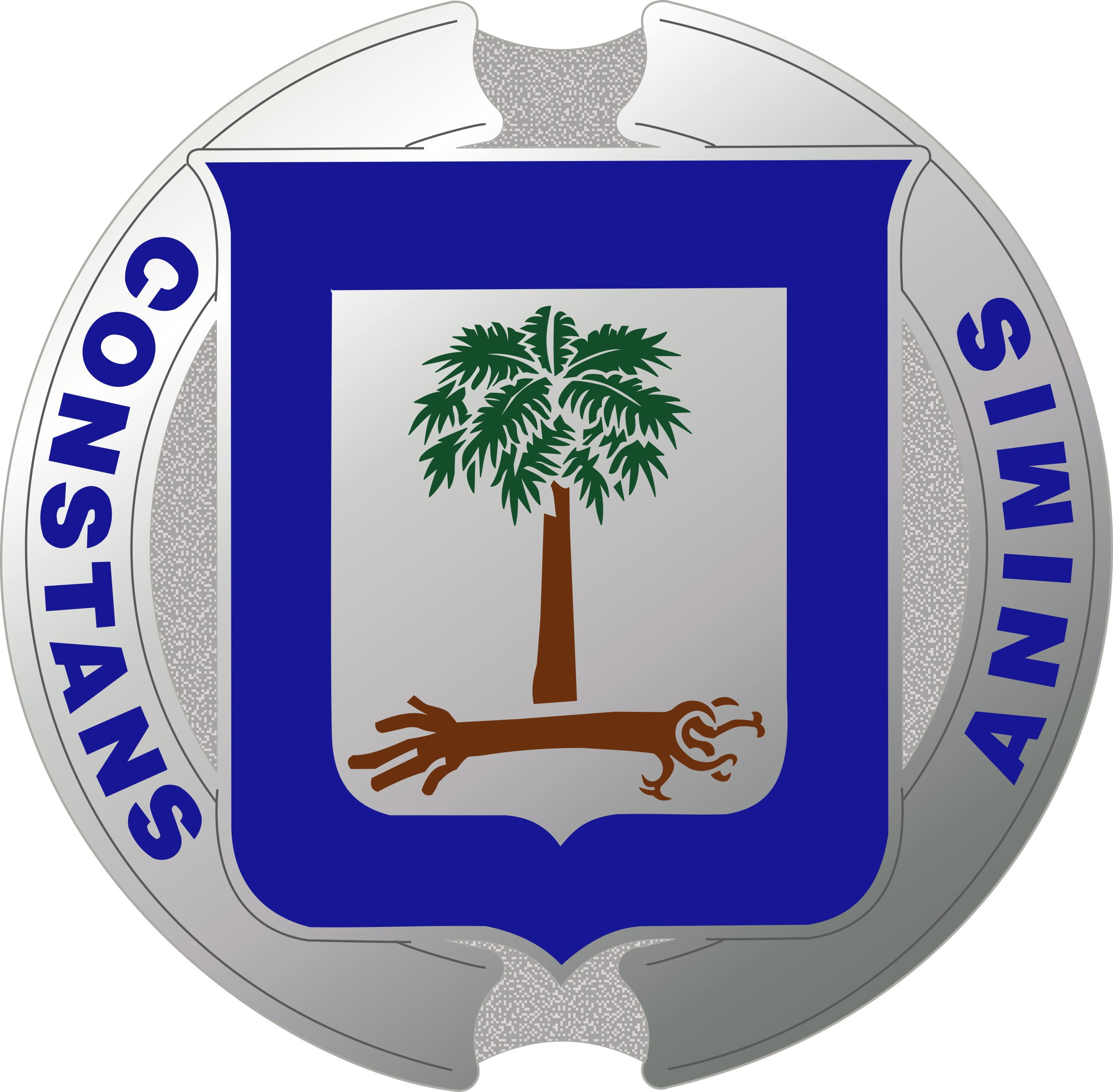
- Distinctive Unit Insignia

The 218th Infantry Regiment (First South Carolina) was an infantry regiment of the United States Army National Guard, active between 1947 and 1959. Since 1997, the 218th Regiment has been the Regional Training institute of the South Carolina Army National Guard.

== History ==
=== Origins ===
The 218th Infantry traced its lineage back to the 1st South Carolina Infantry (Gregg's), a Confederate unit of the American Civil War. During the Reconstruction it existed as rifle clubs and following the readmission of South Carolina to the United States the regiment was reorganized as separate companies between 1875 and 1878. On 9 January 1878 the separate companies became part of the 3rd Division, which was reorganized as the 3rd Infantry Regiment of the South Carolina Volunteers in 1883. On 23 November 1907 it was reorganized as the 1st Infantry Regiment of the South Carolina National Guard. The 1st South Carolina was called up for service on the Mexican border on 1 July 1916 at Styx. After returning from the border it was mustered out on 6 December. As a result of the United States' entry into World War I, the regiment was called up on 12 April 1917 and drafted into Federal service on 5 August 1917. It was redesignated as the 118th Infantry Regiment of the 30th Division and served in France.

The 118th was demobilized after the end of the war and consolidated with the 105th Ammunition Train, the former 2nd South Carolina Infantry, to form the 1st Infantry, South Carolina National Guard, between 1919 and 1921. This unit was redesignated the 118th Infantry on 19 December 1921, and fought in World War II with the 30th Division.

=== 1946–1959 ===
Postwar, when the National Guard was reformed, the 2nd and 3rd Battalions of the 118th were withdrawn from the latter and reorganized as the 218th Infantry Regiment, whose headquarters was Federally recognized on 3 February 1947 at Spartanburg. The 218th was stationed in northwestern South Carolina, and was part of the 51st Infantry Division. On 1 April 1959, when the United States Army adopted a pentomic division structure in an attempt to address the perceived tactical nuclear weapons threat, the regiment was relieved from the 51st Division and broken up.

Its headquarters and headquarters company at Spartanburg, Service Company at Gaffney, and the Medical Platoons of the 1st (Gaffney) and 3rd (Spartanburg) Battalions were consolidated to form the 151st Transportation Battalion, headquartered at Spartanburg. The Headquarters Company of the 1st Battalion (Union), Medical Company (York), Tank Company (Pacolet), Heavy Mortar Company (Jonesville), and Companies A (Union), B (Winnsboro), C (Woodruff), F (Chester, and K (Whitmire) were consolidated to form the 2nd Battle Group, 118th Infantry, headquartered at Union. The 2nd Battalion HHC (Rock Hill) and Companies E (Rock Hill), G (Clover), and H (Ft. Mill) consolidated to form the 2nd Reconnaissance Squadron, 263rd Armor, headquartered at Rock Hill.

Company D at Laurens was redesignated as Battery D of the 1st Automatic Weapons Battalion, 263rd Artillery, the HHC of the 3rd Battalion at Greenwood became the HHD of the 108th Signal Battalion, Company I at Ware Shoals became the 114th Signal Company, Company L at Batesburg became Company A of the 151st Signal Battalion, and Company M at Saluda became Company D of the 122nd Engineer Battalion.

=== Regional Training Institute, 1997–present ===
The 218th Infantry Regiment, now known simply as the 218th Regiment, is a regiment of the South Carolina Army National Guard. It serves as the RTI (Regional Training Institute) for the state's National Guard units. The 1st Battalion conducts 12N (Horizontal Construction Engineer) training. The 2nd Battalion conducts OCS (Officer Candidate School) training. The 3rd Battalion conducts ALC (Advanced Leader Course) and NCO (Non-commissioned officer) Academy training. The 4th Battalion is a "general studies" Battalion, and conducts training to support 31B (Military Police), 88M (Motor Transport Operator), Army Basic Instructor Course, and the Pre-Command Course. Lastly, the 5th Battalion conducts 25U (Signal Support Systems Specialist) and 25B (Information technology specialist) training.268th Engineer Detachment (Firefighter) and 679th Engineer Detachment (Utility)
