= 678th Air Defense Artillery Brigade (United States) =

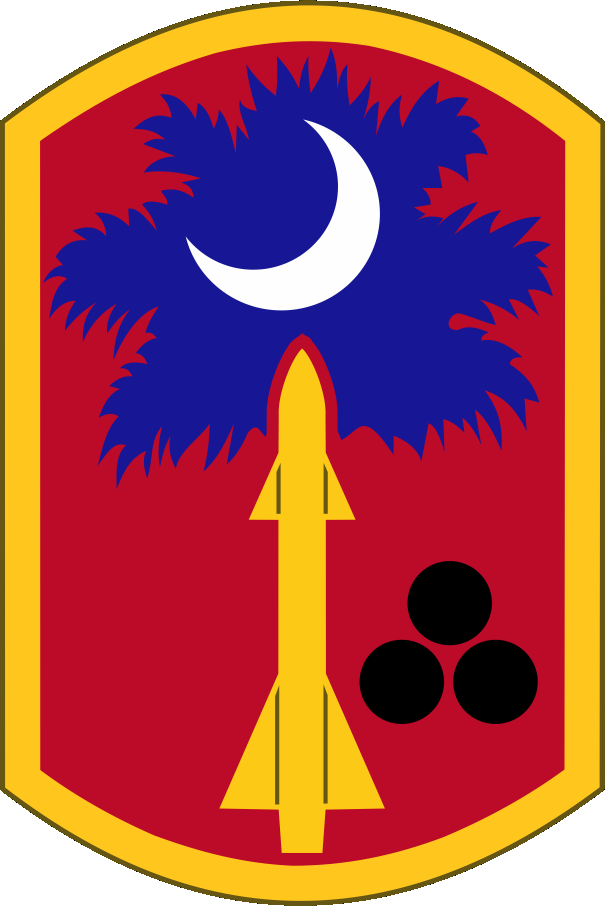
- 678th Air Defense Artillery Brigade
- Active: 2016-present
- Country: United States
- Allegiance: South Carolina Army National Guard
- Branch: United States Army National Guard
- Type: Brigade
- Role: Air defense artillery
- Part of: 263rd Army Air and Missile Defense Command
- Garrison/HQ: Eastover
- Mottos: For Freedom, We Defend
- Mascot: Oozlefinch

Insignia
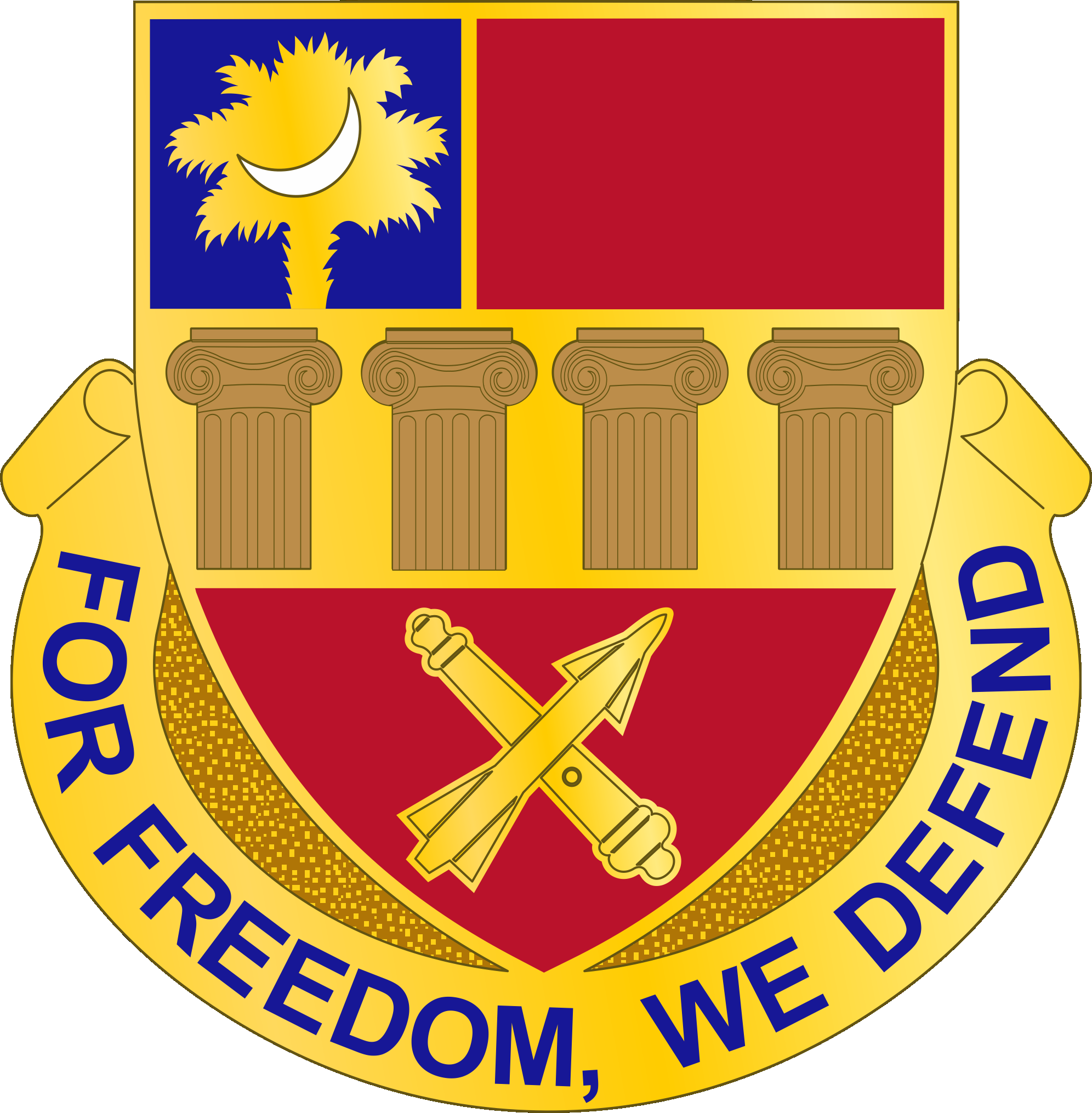
- Distinctive Unit Insignia

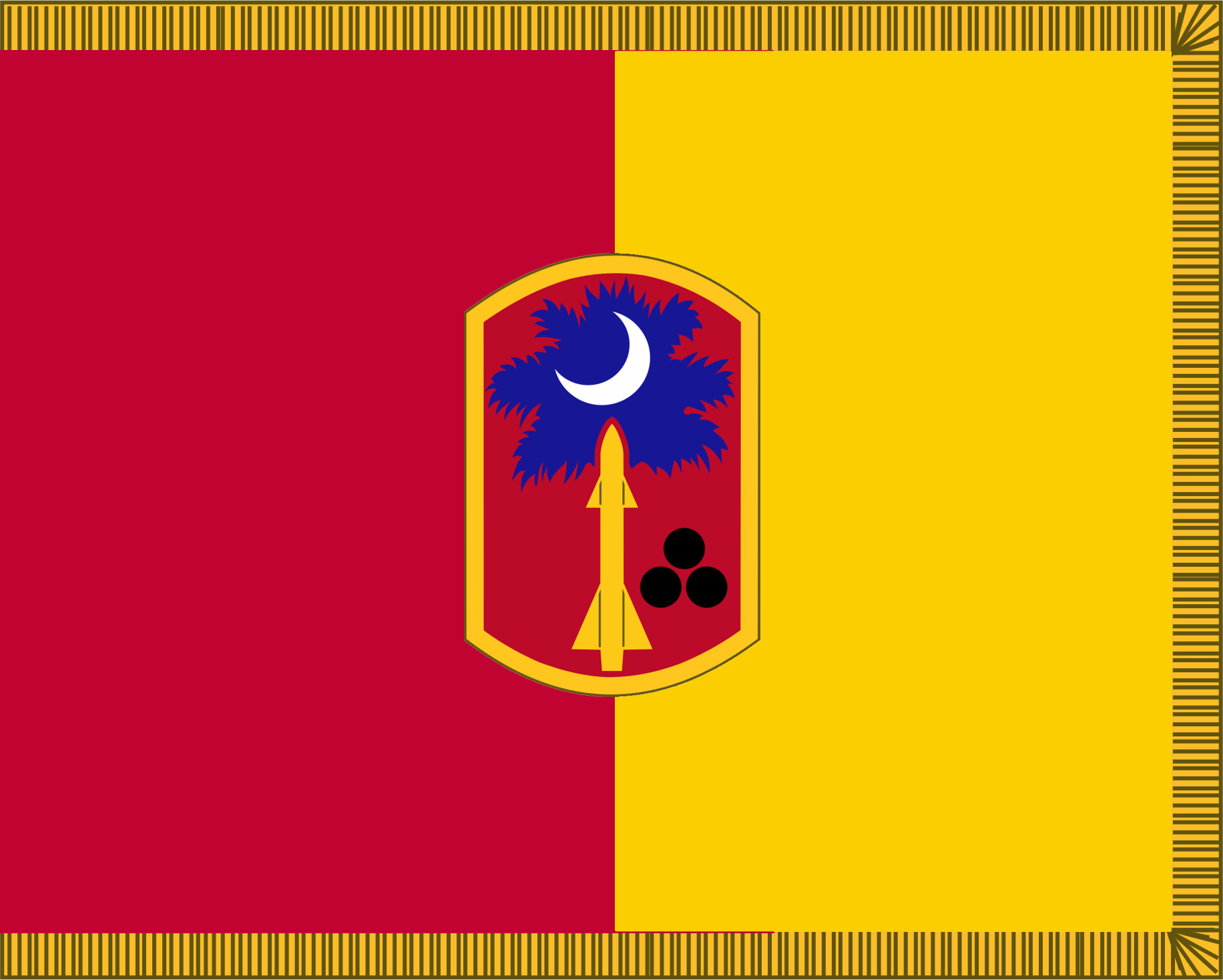
- 678th Air Defense Artillery Brigade Flag

678th Air Defense Artillery Brigade is an Air Defense Artillery Brigade of the South Carolina Army National Guard and the United States Army.

The 678th ADA Brigade is the newest Air Defense Artillery (ADA) Brigade (BDE) in the Army National Guard. Headquartered in Eastover, South Carolina, the brigade has two subordinate battalions, 1-178th FA (Paladin) and 2-263d ADA (Avenger) located across the state. The 678th ADA BDE is a subordinate unit of the 263d Army Air & Missile Defense Command (AAMDC) which is headquartered in Anderson, South Carolina.

Soldiers assigned to 1st Battalion 178th Field Artillery Regiment, were sent to Washnigton DC in December 2025. Three hundred plus soldiers (many of whom volunteered to join the mission) went to Washington, D.C., in support of the D.C. Safe and Beautiful mission. There, they will assist the Metropolitan Police Department in maintaining public safety for residents, commuters, and visitors throughout the District.

== Organization ==
- 678th Air Defense Artillery Brigade, at McEntire Joint National Guard Base
  - Headquarters and Headquarters Battery, 678th Air Defense Artillery Brigade, at McEntire Joint National Guard Base
  - 1st Battalion, 178th Field Artillery Regiment, in Georgetown (M109A6 Paladin)
    - Headquarters and Headquarters Battery, 1st Battalion, 178th Field Artillery Regiment, in Georgetown
    - Battery A, 1st Battalion, 178th Field Artillery Regiment, in Andrews
    - Battery B, 1st Battalion, 178th Field Artillery Regiment, in Clinton
    - Battery C, 1st Battalion, 178th Field Artillery Regiment, in Manning
    - 1178th Forward Support Company, in Hemingway
      - Detachment 1, 1178th Forward Support Company, in Myrtle Beach
  - 2nd Battalion, 263rd Air Defense Artillery Regiment, in Anderson (AN/TWQ-1 Avenger)
    - Headquarters and Headquarters Battery, 2nd Battalion, 263rd Air Defense Artillery Regiment, in Anderson
    - Battery A, 2nd Battalion, 263rd Air Defense Artillery Regiment, in Seneca
    - Battery B, 2nd Battalion, 263rd Air Defense Artillery Regiment, in Easley
    - Battery C, 2nd Battalion, 263rd Air Defense Artillery Regiment, in Clemson
    - Battery D, 2nd Battalion, 263rd Air Defense Artillery Regiment, in Clemson

== List of Brigade Commanders ==
Commander	From	To
COL Frank Rice	May 2014	May 2016
COL Richard Wholey	May 15, 2016	April 6, 2019
COL Michael Gibson	April 6, 2019	April 2, 2022
LTC Brooks Yarborough	April 2, 2022	April 1, 2023
COL David Ridgeway	April 1, 2023	November 17, 2024
COL Larry Saunders	November 17, 2024	Present
