= 263rd Army Air and Missile Defense Command =

- 263rd Army Air and Missile Defense Command shoulder sleeve insignia
- Active: 2000 – present
- Country: [[United States]
- Allegiance: South Carolina Army National Guard
- Branch: United States Army National Guard
- Type: Air defense
- Size: Command
- Part of: Space and Missile Defense Command (2025)
- Garrison/HQ: Anderson, South Carolina

Commanders
- Current commander: Major General Frank M. Rice

Insignia
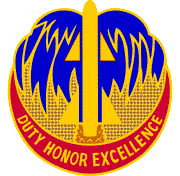
- Distinctive unit insignia

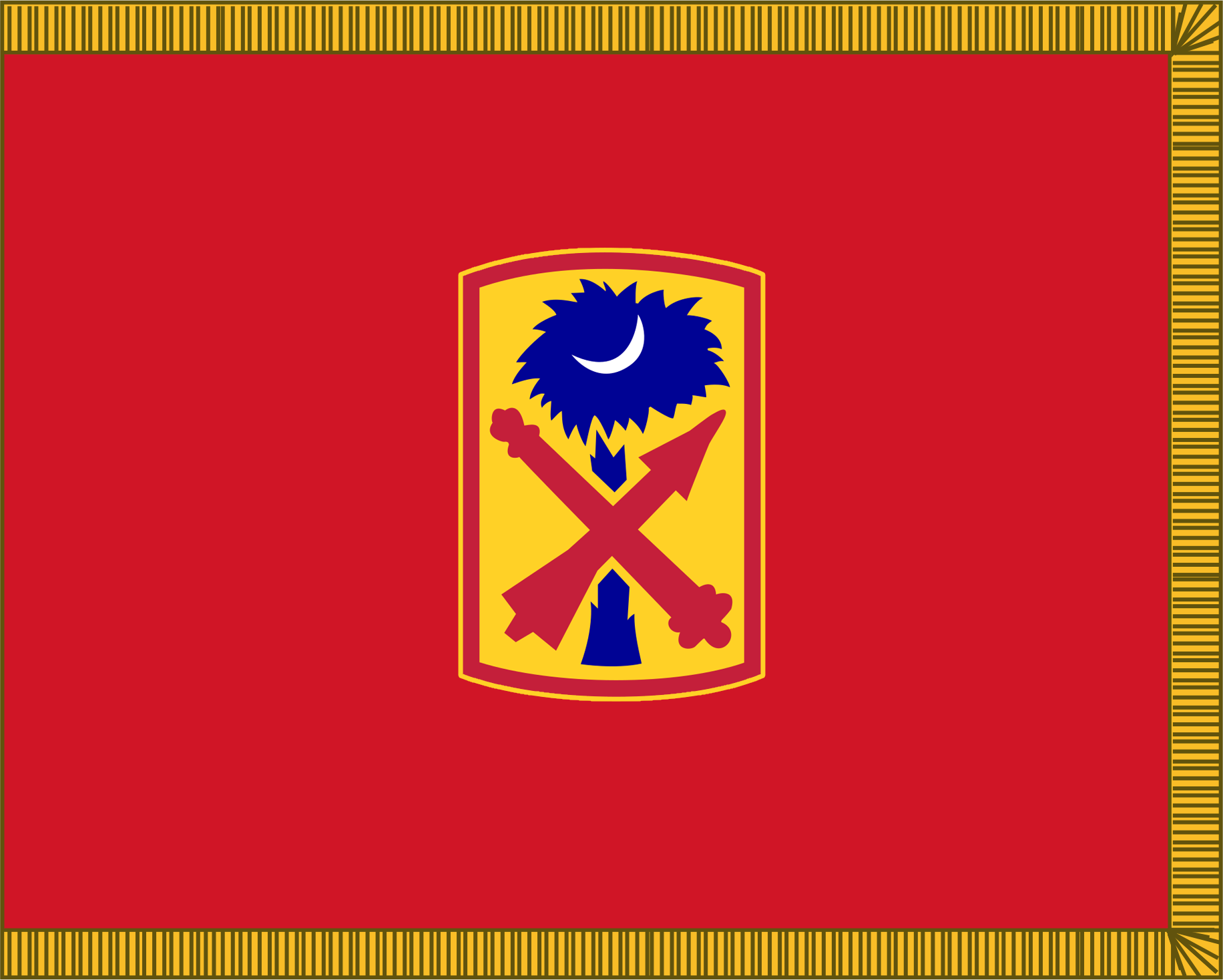
- 263rd Army Air and Missile Defense Command Flag

The 263rd Army Air and Missile Defense Command (263 AMDC) is an air defense artillery command of the United States Army, South Carolina Army National Guard. The 263rd is one of several National Guard units with colonial roots, and is one of only nineteen Army National Guard units with campaign credit for the War of 1812. The 263rd ADA Brigade was reflagged as 263rd Army Air and Missile Defense Command during 2000.

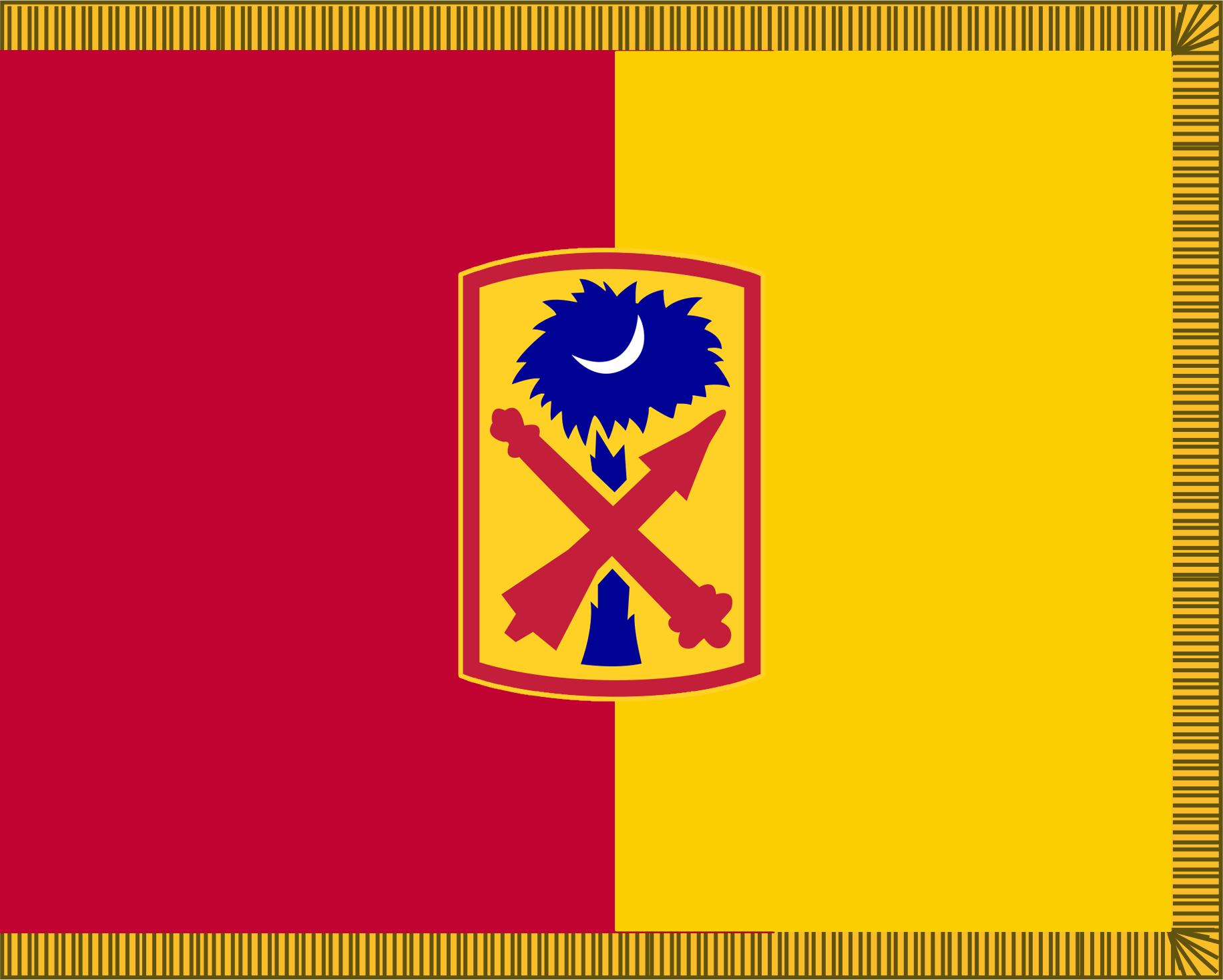
263rd Air Defense Artillery Brigade Flag

On 19 October 2024, Battery B, 2nd Battalion, 263rd Air Defense Artillery Regiment, 263rd Army Air and Missile Defense Command was deployed to support Operation Inherent Resolve and the U.S. Central Command as a whole.

263 AAMDC became part of Space and Missile Defense Command, being transferred from Forces Command, in late 2025.

== Organization ==
- 263rd Army Air and Missile Defense Command, in Anderson
  - Headquarters and Headquarters Battery, 263rd Army Air and Missile Defense Command, in Anderson
  - 678th Air Defense Artillery Brigade, at McEntire Joint National Guard Base
    - Headquarters and Headquarters Battery, 678th Air Defense Artillery Brigade, at McEntire Joint National Guard Base
    - 1st Battalion, 178th Field Artillery Regiment, in Georgetown (M109A6 Paladin)
      - Headquarters and Headquarters Battery, 1st Battalion, 178th Field Artillery Regiment, in Georgetown
      - Battery A, 1st Battalion, 178th Field Artillery Regiment, in Andrews
      - Battery B, 1st Battalion, 178th Field Artillery Regiment, in Clinton
      - Battery C, 1st Battalion, 178th Field Artillery Regiment, in Manning
      - 1178th Forward Support Company, in Hemingway
        - Detachment 1, 1178th Forward Support Company, in Myrtle Beach
    - 2nd Battalion, 263rd Air Defense Artillery Regiment, in Anderson (AN/TWQ-1 Avenger)
      - Headquarters and Headquarters Battery, 2nd Battalion, 263rd Air Defense Artillery Regiment, in Anderson
      - Battery A, 2nd Battalion, 263rd Air Defense Artillery Regiment, in Seneca
      - Battery B, 2nd Battalion, 263rd Air Defense Artillery Regiment, in Easley
      - Battery C, 2nd Battalion, 263rd Air Defense Artillery Regiment, in Clemson
      - Battery D, 2nd Battalion, 263rd Air Defense Artillery Regiment, in Clemson
