= 238th Aviation Regiment =

- Country: United States
- Branch: United States Army Aviation Branch
- Type: Aviation
- Size: Regiment
- Motto: Eye of the Cyclone

Aircraft flown
- Cargo helicopter: CH-47F Chinook
- Utility helicopter: UH-60L Black Hawk

The 238th Aviation Regiment is an aviation regiment of the U.S. Army.

== Structure ==
- 2nd Battalion (General Support) (IN ARNG) "Raptors"
- Afghanistan 2017 - 2018
  - Headquarters Company (IN ARNG) "Guardians"
  - Company A (CO ARNG) "Wolfpack"
  - Company B (CH-47)
    - Detachment 1 "Carolina Hookers" at Army Aviation Support Facility #2, Donaldson Center Airport (SC ARNG)
    - "River City Hookers" at Army Aviation Support Facility #3, Peoria International Airport (IL ARNG)
  - Company C (UH-60) "Hoosier Dustoff"
    - Middle East 2020
  - Company D
    - Detachment 6 (AR ARNG)
  - Company E
    - Detachment 1 (CO ARNG)
    - Detachment 6 (AR ARNG)
  - Company F (UH-60)
    - Detachment 1 (AR ARNG)
  - Company G (UH-60L) (LA ARNG)
    - Company Flag (ASMP & FSMP) "Bayou Dustoff" (LA ARNG)
    - Detachment 1 at Army Aviation Support Facility, Reno Stead Airport (NV ARNG)
    - Detachment 2 "Phoenix Dustoff" (AZ ARNG)
- 3rd Battalion (General Support) (MI ARNG)
  - Headquarters Company
    - Detachment 1 (DE ARNG)
  - Company A "Misfits" (DE ARNG)
  - Company B (CH-47)
    - Detachment 1 at Selfridge (MI ARNG)
  - Company C (NH ARNG)
    - Detachment 1 at Grand Ledge (MI ARNG)
  - Company D at Grand Ledge (MI ARNG)
    - Detachment 1 (DE ARNG)
  - Company E at Grand Ledge (MI ARNG)
    - Detachment 1 (DE ARNG)
