= Donaldson Center Airport =

Airport in Greenville, South Carolina, United States

Donaldson Field Airport
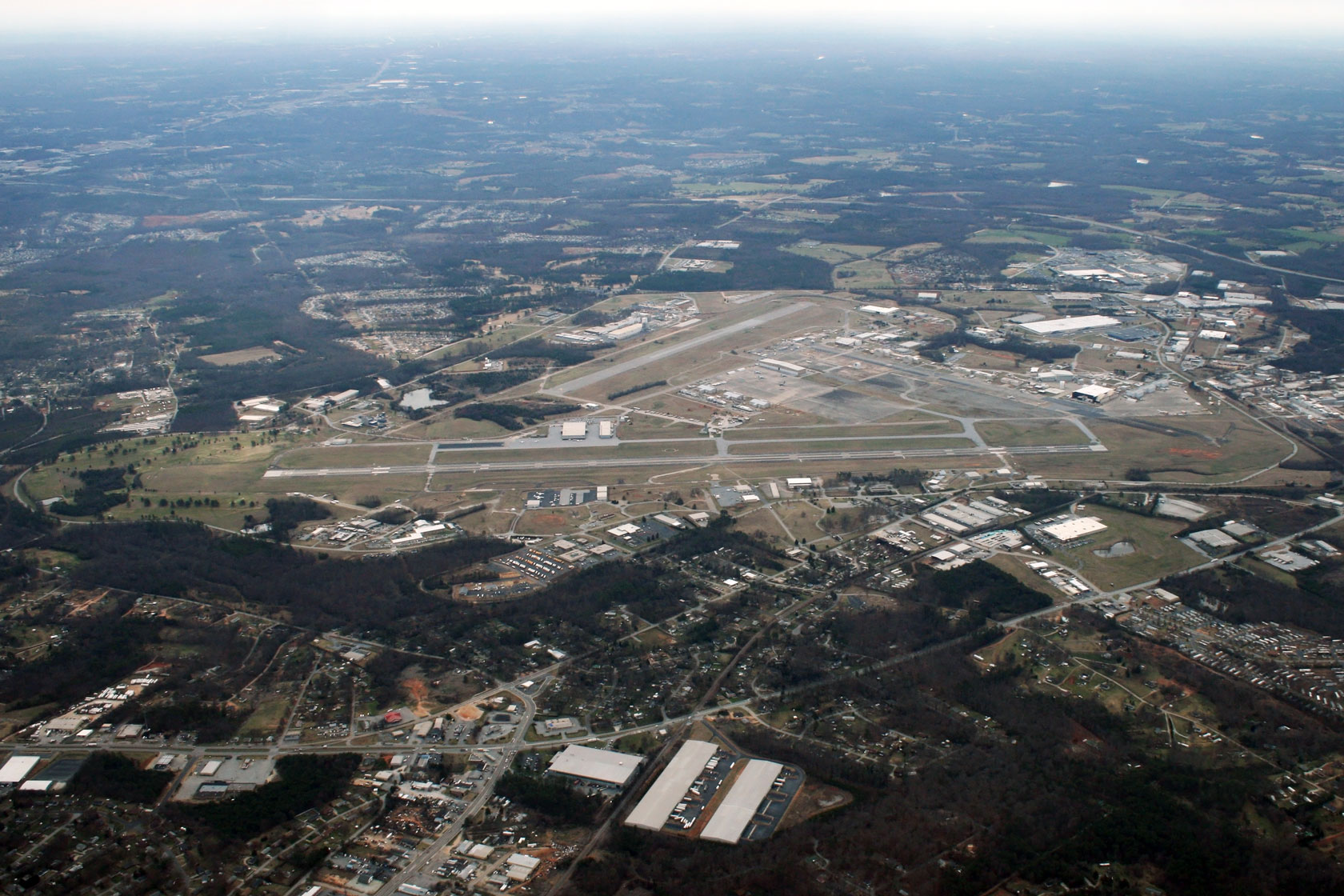
- IATA: GDC; ICAO: KGYH; FAA LID: GYH

Summary
- Airport type: Public
- Owner: Greenville City/County
- Serves: Greenville, South Carolina
- Elevation AMSL: 956 ft (291 m)
- Coordinates: 34°45′30″N 082°22′35″W
- Website: www.sc-tac.com
- Interactive map of Donaldson Field Airport

Runways
Direction	Length		Surface
Direction	ft	m	Surface
5/23	8,000	2,438	Concrete

Statistics (2022)
- Aircraft operations: 54,643
- Based aircraft: 54
- Source: Federal Aviation Administration

Donaldson Field Airport (IATA: GDC, ICAO: KGYH, FAA LID: GYH) is a public airport 6 mi (9.7 km) south of the central business district of Greenville, a city in Greenville County, South Carolina, United States. It is located at the Donaldson Center Industrial Air Park and is owned by the City and County of Greenville.

Although most U.S. airports use the same three-letter location identifier for the FAA and IATA, Donaldson Field Airport is assigned GYH by the FAA and GDC by the IATA.

== History ==
Greenville Army Air Base opened in 1942 during World War II. It was later known as Greenville Air Force Base. In 1951 it was renamed Donaldson Air Force Base, in honor of Captain John O. Donaldson, a World War I flying ace. The U.S. Air Force announced Donaldson's closure in 1962. The City and County of Greenville took title of the facilities in 1964 and named it Donaldson Center Industrial Air Park.

== Facilities and aircraft ==
Donaldson Field Airport covers an area of 1,300 acres (530 ha) which contains one runway designated 5/23 with 8,000 x 150 ft (2,438 x 46 m) concrete pavement.

For the 12-month period ending December 31, 2022, the airport had 54,643 aircraft operations, an average of 150 per day: 71% general aviation, 21% air taxi and 7% military. At that time there were 54 aircraft based at this airport: 30 single-engine, 7 multi-engine, 3 jet, 1 helicopter, 12 military, and 1 ultra-light.

Donaldson Field is home to Bravo Company Det-1, CH-47 Chinook, of 2nd battalion 238th Aviation Regiment of the South Carolina Army National Guard is located on the northwest end of the field, which opened on February 19, 2014.

The fixed-base operators (FBO) located on the west side of the field is Vantage Aviation. Vantage operates two locations at Donaldson Field, Vantage North and Vantage South. Vantage North is the former location of Donaldson Jet Center and Vantage South is the former location of AvServe. General aviation and executive aviation operate from Vantage North and freight aviation operate from Vantage South. Lockheed Martin operates a large facility on the southeast side of the field. Stevens Aerospace operates a maintenance, repair and overhaul (MRO) station on the east side of the field. In 2019 Lockheed Martin was awarded a contract to begin the production of the F-16 Viper for foreign sales.

== Airlines and destinations ==
=== Cargo ===
Airlines	Destinations
Aeronaves TSM	Laredo, Shreveport

== Accidents ==
- On December 16, 1948, a USAF Fairchild C-82 Packet crashed 5 km S of then Greenville AFB on a local flight. Four out of the 7 on board were killed.

== See also ==
- List of airports in South Carolina
