= South Carolina Adjutant General =

The adjutant general of South Carolina is head of the South Carolina Military Department, overseeing the South Carolina National Guard, the South Carolina State Guard and the South Carolina Emergency Management Division. The adjutant general is the highest-ranking uniformed officer in the state, subordinate to the Governor who serves as commander-in-chief of the South Carolina National Guard.

== History ==
The office was the only state adjutant general in the United States that was an elected position. In 2014, South Carolina voters approved a referendum amending the state constitution to provide for the adjutant general to be appointed by the governor, effective in 2019.

The current adjutant general is Major General Robin B. Stilwell. He was confirmed to the position on March 26, 2025 by Governor Henry McMaster following the announced retirement of Major General Van McCarty, and formally assumed command on May 31.

== Duties ==
The adjutant general leads the Military Department of South Carolina.
