= South Carolina National Guard =

Organized militia of the U.S. state of South Carolina

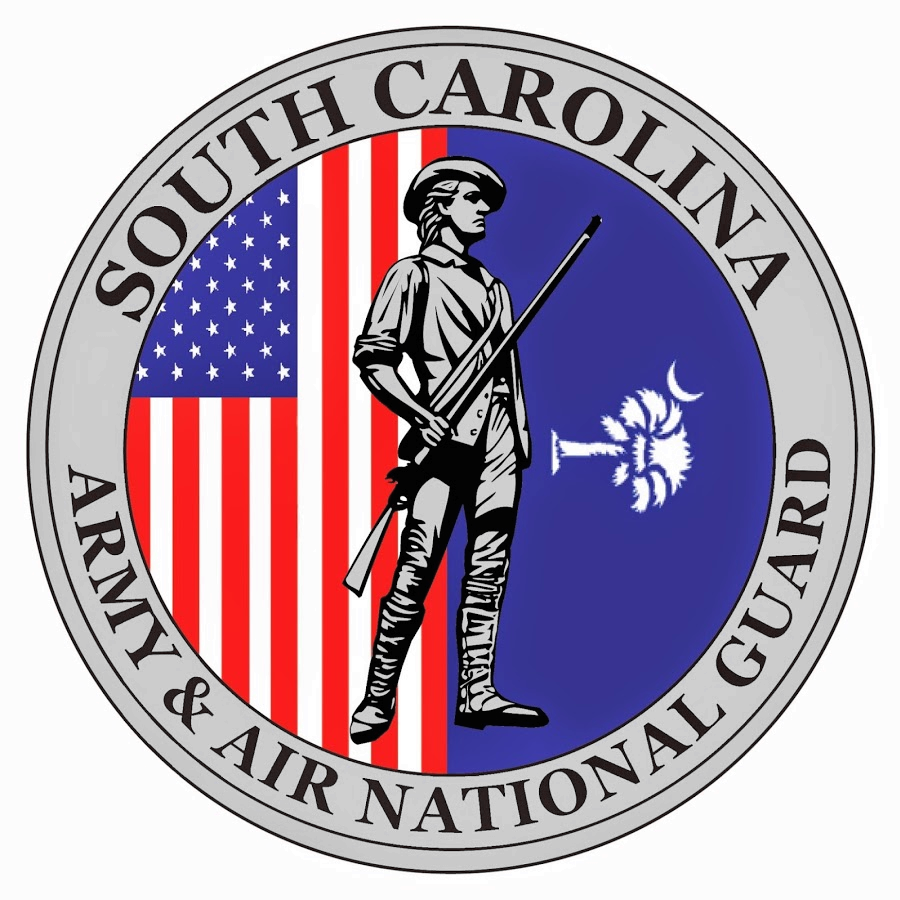
- Seal
- Active: 1663–present
- Country: United States
- Allegiance: South Carolina
- Type: National Guard
- Role: Organized militia Armed forces reserve
- Part of: Government of South Carolina; National Guard of the United States
- Headquarters: Columbia, South Carolina
- Website: www.scguard.ng.mil

Commanders
- Commander in Chief: Governor Henry McMaster
- Adjutant General: Major General Robin Stillwell, SCARNG
- State Command Senior Enlisted Leader: Command Sergeant Major McCall, SC ARNG

Insignia
- Abbreviation: SCNG

The South Carolina National Guard (SCNG) consists of the South Carolina Army National Guard and the South Carolina Air National Guard.

== History ==
The South Carolina National Guard, or Carolina militia as it was originally known, was born from the Carolina Charter of 1663. The charter gave to the Proprietors the right "to Leavy Muſter and Trayne all sortes of men of what Conditon or whereſoever borne in the said Province for the tyme being".

The state had the nation's last elected adjutant general. The adjutant general of South Carolina is presently appointed by the governor.

== Dual missions, state and federal ==
American law specifically charges the National Guard with dual federal and state missions. In fact, the National Guard is the only United States military force empowered to function in a state status. Those functions range from limited actions during non-emergency situations to full scale law enforcement when called upon with the suspension of the Posse Comitatus Act, normally reserved for extreme situations when local law enforcement officials can no longer maintain civil control.

=== Federal mission ===
The National Guard may be called into federal service in response to a call by the president or Congress. When National Guard troops are called to federal service, the president serves as commander-in-chief. The federal mission assigned to the National Guard is: "To provide properly trained and equipped units for prompt mobilization for war, National emergency or as otherwise needed."

=== State mission ===
The governor may call individuals or units of the South Carolina National Guard into state service during emergencies or to assist in special situations which lend themselves to use of the National Guard. The state mission assigned to the National Guard is: "To provide trained and disciplined forces for domestic emergencies or as otherwise provided by state law."

== Facilities ==
The South Carolina National Guard maintains facilities across the state, including armories in major cities and support installations near federal military bases such as Fort Jackson (South Carolina) and Joint Base Charleston. Its coastal facilities support missions including hurricane response and maritime security along the Atlantic coast.

- South Carolina Naval Militia
- South Carolina State Guard
