= Kato Moni =

Kato Moni: Κάτω Μονή (Greek); Aşağı Moni (Turkish)
- Location in Cyprus
- Coordinates: 35°3′39″N 33°5′35″E
- Country: Cyprus
- District: Nicosia District

Population (2001)
  - Total: 311
- Time zone: UTC+2 (EET)
  - Summer (DST): UTC+3 (EEST)

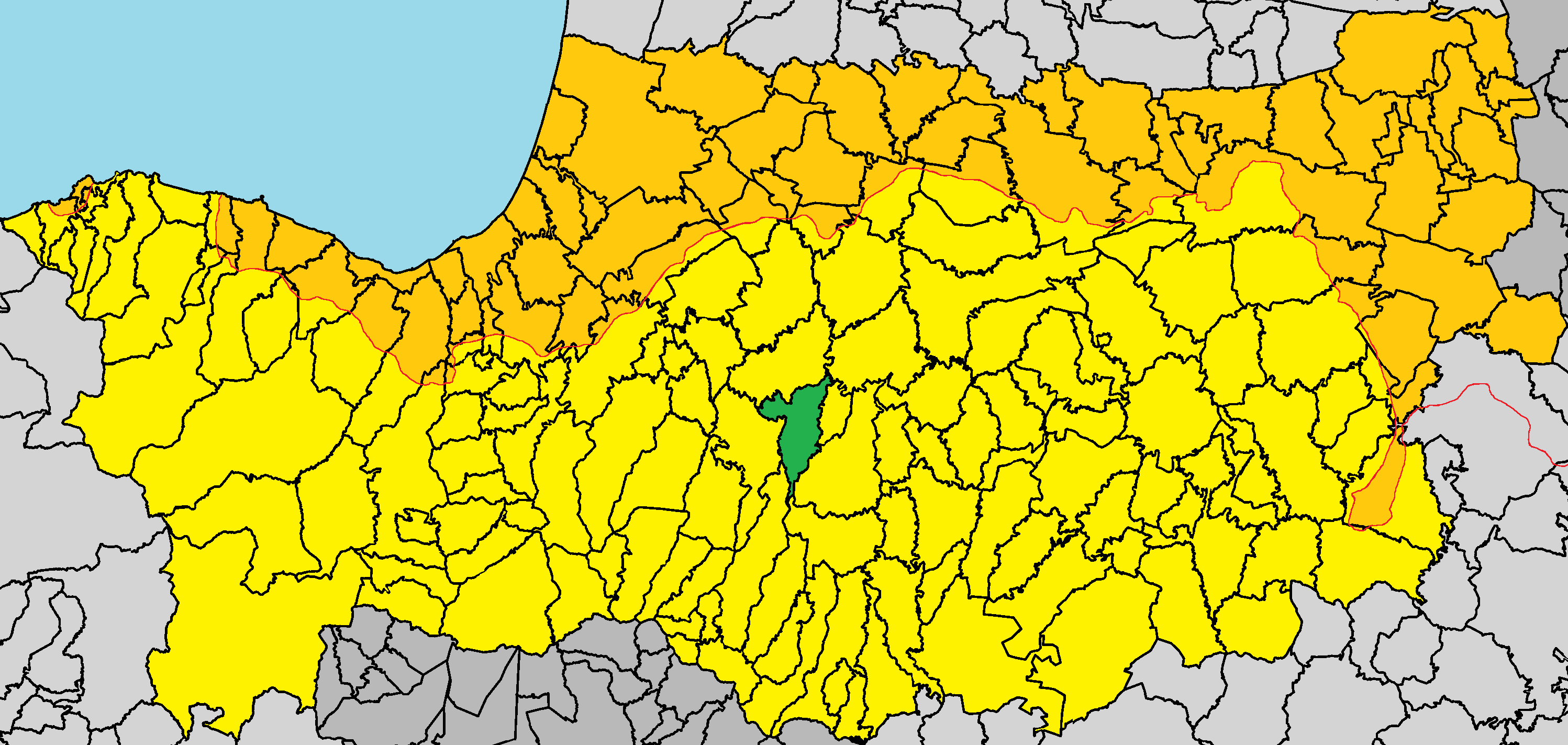

Kato Moni (Greek: Κάτω Μονή; Turkish: Aşağı Moni) is a village in the Nicosia District of Cyprus, located 7 km south of Peristerona. In 2001 the village had 311 inhabitants. East of the town lies the now uninhabited Turkish Cypriot village of Agioi Iliofotoi. Kato Moni is connected via road to the village of Orounta in the north (2 km), to the village of Agioi Iliofotoi in the south-east (1,5 km), and to the village of Agia Marina Xyliatou in the south-west 3 km). In 2017 the village has around 350 inhabitants. The village has two churches the "Metamorphosis" and "Saint Paraskevi".
