= Agioi Iliofotoi =

Community in Nicosia District, Republic of Cyprus

Coordinates: 35°03′32″N 33°06′14″E

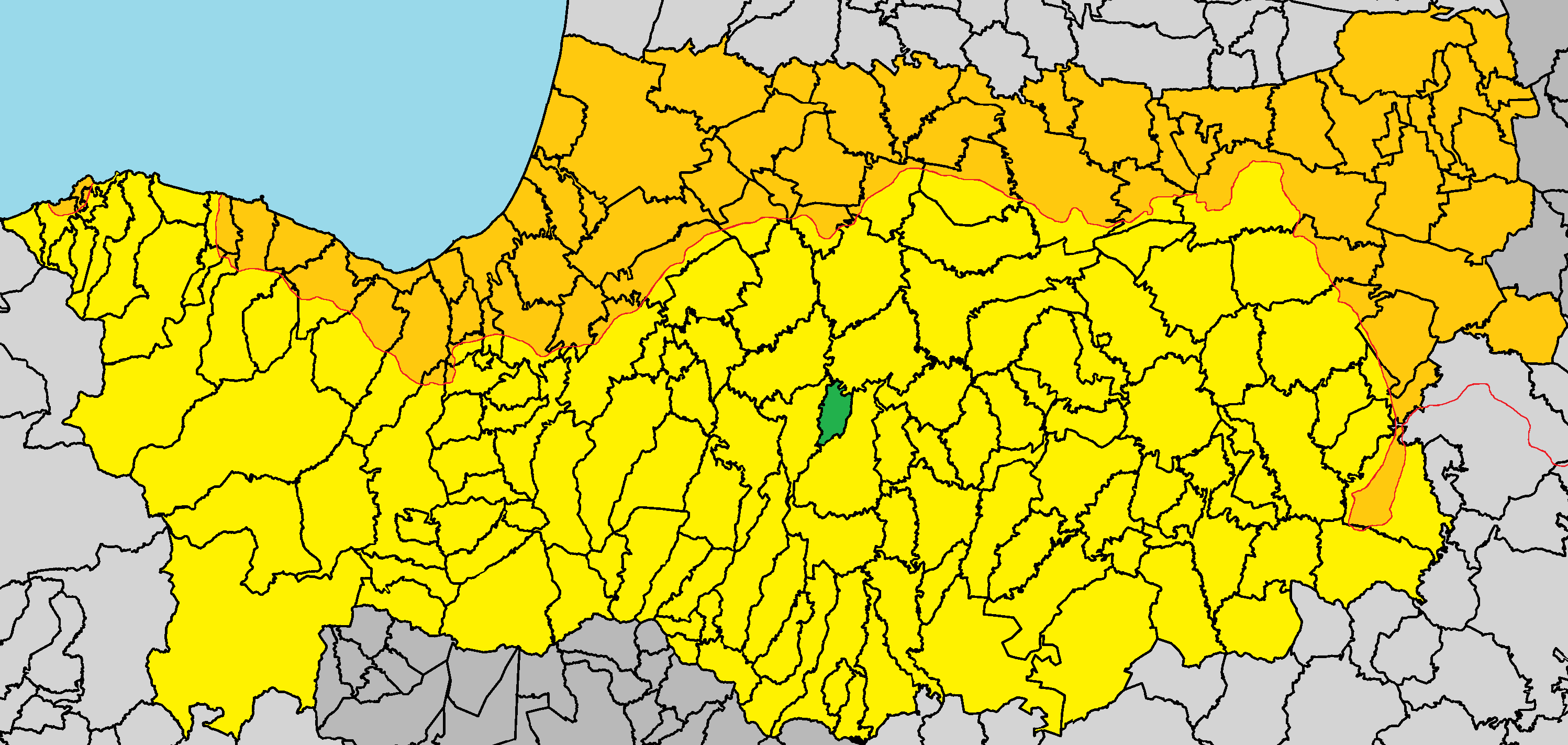
Agioi Iliofotoi in Nicosia District

Agioi Iliofotoi or Eliophotes (Greek: Άγιοι Ηλιόφωτοι; Turkish: Alifodez is Zeytinlik "olive orchard") was a village in the Nicosia District of Cyprus, east of Kato Moni. Agioi Iliofotoi was inhabited exclusively by Turkish Cypriots. It was abandoned in 1964 when they all sought refuge in Nicosia. Agioi Iliofotoi was subsequently demolished, either in the late 1970s or 1980s. In 1960, it had a population of 91.

As of 2011, 60 people were living in the Agioi Iliofotoi administrative unit (community), none of whom were Cypriot citizens. 45 were EU citizens, five of whom female. The remaining 15 were non-EU males. All were employed in manufacturing within the community.
