= List of aerial victories claimed by Hans-Joachim Marseille =

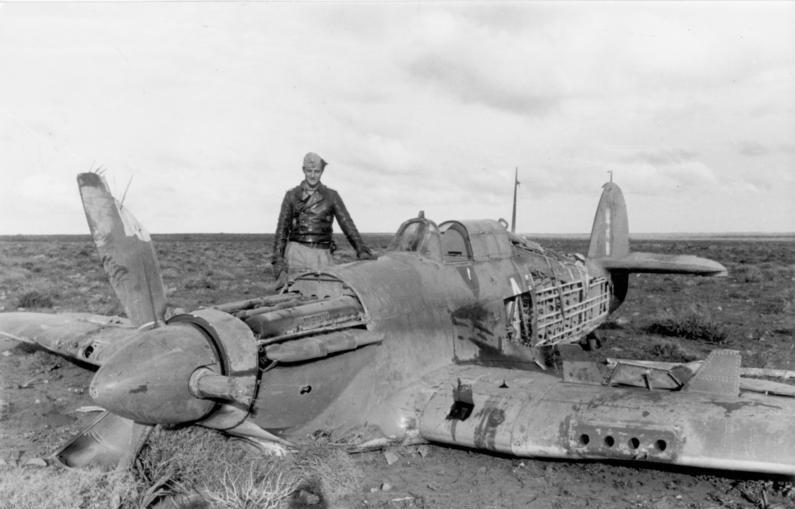
Marseille standing next to one of his aerial victories, a Hurricane Mk IIB, possibly of No. 213 Squadron RAF, February 1942. There may be sufficient remains on the code to identify it as a No. 274 Squadron RAF aircraft.

Hans-Joachim Marseille (13 December 1919 – 30 September 1942) was a German Luftwaffe fighter pilot and flying ace during World War II. He is noted for his aerial battles during the North African Campaign and his Bohemian lifestyle. One of the most successful fighter pilots, he was nicknamed the "Star of Africa". Marseille claimed all but seven of his 158 victories against the British Commonwealth's Desert Air Force over North Africa, flying the Messerschmitt Bf 109 fighter for his entire combat career. No other pilot claimed as many Western Allied aircraft as Marseille.

== List of aerial victories claimed ==
According to US historian David T. Zabecki, Marseille was credited with 158 aerial victories. Obermaier also lists him with 158 aerial victories claimed in 382 combat missions. Spick states that Marseille had a mission-to-claim ratio of 2.42. The German Federal Archives still hold records for 109 of Marseille aerial victories. A further biographer of Marseille, Walter Wübbe, has made an attempt to link these records to Allied units, squadrons and when possible even to individual pilots, in order to verify the claims as much as possible. The dates and times detailed below are based on Wübbe; the information provided on the identity of enemy units and personnel is taken from multiple sources. Mathews and Foreman, authors of Luftwaffe Aces – Biographies and Victory Claims, also researched the German Federal Archives and found records for 152 aerial victory claims, plus seven further unconfirmed claims. All of these victories were claimed over the Western Allies.

♠ (Ace of spades) indicates those aerial victories which made Marseille an "ace-in-a-day", a term which designates a fighter pilot who has shot down five or more airplanes in a single day.
This indicates that the aerial combat report is missing from the German Federal Archives.
This indicates that Australian historian Russell Brown has expressed doubt regarding the veracity of Marseille's claims.
? (question mark) indicates information discrepancies listed by Prien, Stemmer, Rodeike, Bock, Mathews and Foreman.

Claims	Date	Time	Notes
– 1940 – I. (Jagd) Gruppe of Lehrgeschwader 2 (Note: According to the authors Prien, Stemmer, Rodeike and Bock, Marseille claimed six aerial victories of unknown type and date in the timeframe 26 June to 31 October 1940. In addition, he claimed a 7th aerial victory over a Spitfire dated on 9 September which was witnessed by Buhl. All seven victories were claimed while serving with I. (Jagd)/LG 2 on the English Channel.)
1? (Note: According to Mathews and Foreman this claim is unconfirmed.)	24 August 1940	—	Claim: Hurricane/Spitfire over Kent.
1?	24 August 1940	—	I.(J)/LG 2 was ordered to fly three combat missions over the area of Kent. The 1. Staffel claimed three aerial victories out of ten victories claimed by I.(J)/LG 2 in total in return for three losses. Fighter Command lost 14 fighters to enemy fighter action that day.
2?	2 September 1940	—	Claim: Spitfire over Detling, Kent.
2?	2 September 1940	—	Only one Spitfire was lost in the Detling area—Maidstone—at around 16:25. Sergeant J. Stokes, from the Royal Air Force (RAF) No. 603 Squadron was wounded. The identity of his attackers is unknown. Seven Spitfires were destroyed and four damaged in combat on this day. Marseille's aircraft was severely hit so that he had to crash land near Calais-Marck. Messerschmitt Bf 109 E-7 Werknummer 3579 was 50% damaged. I.(J)/LG 2 claimed six aerial victories and reported one loss. (Note: One Bf 109 E, Werknummer 3579, which it is claimed he crash-landed, has been recovered, restored, and painted in the colours of "White 14", an aircraft with which he was associated.)
3?	11 September 1940	17:05	Claim: Spitfire over southern England.
3?	11 September 1940	17:05	Marseille flew as wingman to promoted Hauptfeldwebel Helmut Goedert. Marseille's aircraft was severely damaged by a Hurricane pilot forcing him to crash-land at the French coast near Wissant. Bf 109 E-7 Werknummer 5597 was 75% damaged. Only two Hurricane squadrons filed claims for Bf 109s on that date—No. 253 and No. 303 Squadron RAF. No. 303 Squadron made their claims at around 16:00 Greenwich Mean Time (GMT) the same time (17:00 Central European Time, CET), Marseille was in the air. I.(J)/LG 2 claimed seven aerial victories for the loss of two in this engagement. One source asserts no RAF fighters were reported lost in or around 17:05, or between 16:20 – 17:30 on this date. The only other aircraft reported lost at 17:30 were two Bristol Blenheim's of No. 235 Squadron RAF which were shot down by Bf 109s whilst raiding Calais. However another source gives the loss of one No. 266 Squadron RAF Spitfire at 17:10. Pilot Officer R.J.B Roach bailed out and P7313 was destroyed. Given the one hour time difference, two other Spitfires may fit the time-frame—one from No. 72 Squadron RAF piloted by Pilot Officer B. Douthwaite and another from No. 222 Squadron RAF piloted by Pilot Officer W.R Asseheton—were damaged and force-landed at 16:05 and 16:01 respectively. Given the large aerial battles that were fought on this date, the German opponents of these squadrons at the time of these losses remain unknown.
? (Note: These two claims are not listed by Prien.)	14 September 1940	09:30; 10:20	Claim: Two Spitfires over the Thames Estuary, England.
?	14 September 1940	09:30; 10:20	According to Mathews and Foreman, the first claim at 09:30 was confirmed and is listed by the authors as Marseille's first aerial victory while the second claim at 10:20 was unconfirmed. According to Prien, I.(J)/LG 2 flew two combat missions that day without filing any claims.
4? (Note: This claim is not listed by Mathews and Foreman.)	15 September 1940	—	Claim: Hurricane over the River Thames, England.
4?	15 September 1940	—	I.(J)/LG 2 claimed four aerial victories in return for two losses. Only two Hurricanes were lost over the Thames on this date. Pilot Officer A Hess in R4085 and Sgt J Hubacek in R4087, both of No. 310 Squadron RAF. Both pilots survived.
5?	18 September 1940	—	Claim: Spitfire over southern England.
6?	27 September 1940	—	Claim: Hurricane over London.
6?	27 September 1940	—	I.(J)/LG 2 claimed six aerial victories sustaining four losses including the Staffelkapitän Adolf Buhl. Oberleutnant Buhl was shot down and killed in action when his aircraft crashed into the sea, victims of No. 46 Squadron RAF near RAF Biggin Hill. The time of Marseille's claims are unknown. No. 46 Squadron suffered one loss when an unknown pilot force-landed, his machine damaged, after combat in the same battle. Nine Hurricanes were destroyed and seven damaged on this day. Six of the destroyed and three of the damaged machines suffered the damage on combat with Bf 109s.
8?	28 September 1940	—	Claim: Spitfire over southern England.
8?	28 September 1940	—	Fighter Command lost four Spitfires in action with Bf 109s on this date. All were shot down near 10:30. Three were from No. 41 Squadron RAF and one from No. 605 Squadron RAF. H.A.J MacDonald of No. 605 Squadron was killed as was J.G. Boyle of No. 41 Squadron. Pilots H.H Chalder and E.S Aldous suffered serious and minor wounds respectively.
– 1941 – I. Gruppe of Jagdgeschwader 27
8	23 April 1941	12:50	Claim: Hurricane over Tobruk.
8	23 April 1941	12:50	The adversaries were Hurricanes from No. 73 Squadron RAF. This unit lost three aircraft in aerial combat with Bf 109 around noon. One further Hurricane was lost on the ground while two were damaged in the air. Squadron Leader P.G Wykeham bailed out, Pilot Officer Peter Haldenby was killed and Flying Officer R.F Martin was wounded. I./JG 27 claimed seven Hurricanes in two engagements: four between 10.40 – 11.05 and three from 12.50 – 13.00. Marseille's Bf 109 E-7 (Werknummer 5160) sustained 100% damage after combat and belly landing at Tobruk and being shot down by Sous-Lt. Denis.
9	28 April 1941	09:25	Claim: Bristol Blenheim over the sea north of Tobruk.
9	28 April 1941	09:25	The Blenheim was T2429, from No. 45 Squadron RAF, piloted by Pilot Officer B. C. de G. Allan. The crew and passengers were killed in the crash. (Note: Eyewitness to this aerial battle was Jan Yindrich, author of the book "Fortress Tobruk", Uk, Panther 1956. According to Hans Ring a vivid account is given in this book.)
10–11	1 May 1941	09:15; 09:25	Claim: Two Hurricanes 20 km (12 mi) south of Tobruk and 5 km (3.1 mi) southeast of Tobruk.
10–11	1 May 1941	09:15; 09:25	His adversaries were No. 274 Squadron RAF and No. 6 Squadron RAF. I./JG 27 claimed four victories. Pilot Officer Stanley Godden, an ace with seven victories, was killed in action.
12–13	17 June 1941	17:15; 18:45	Claim: Two Hurricanes, the first northeast of Tobruk and the second 15 km (9.3 mi) southeast of Sidi Omar.
12–13	17 June 1941	17:15; 18:45	Germans pilots claimed 13 Hurricanes in numerous engagements, the German authorities confirmed 11 claims, of which seven were credited to I./JG 27. The Allies lost eight Hurricanes. Ten fighters were shot down and one damaged through the day. Around noon, seven Hurricanes of the South African Air Force (SAAF) No. 1 Squadron engaged Bf 109 and lost four aircraft, one of which was lost to ground fire. Lieutenants J B White remains missing, G K Smith was captured but died of wounds, and K K Mitchell survived to become a prisoner. In the afternoon No. 73 Squadron RAF lost one aircraft to flak, No. 229 Squadron RAF lost Pilot Officer G K Wooller killed and No. 274 Squadron RAF also lost Pilot Officers Grassett T L W E Officer; both pilots remain missing. No. 33 Squadron RAF lost Flying Officer E J Woods killed. The Italians claimed three aerial victories. However, Marseille's victims most likely belonged to No. 229 Squadron RAF and/or No. 274 Squadron RAF. Marseille claimed two.
14	28 August 1941	18:00	Claim: Hurricane 3 km (1.9 mi) northwest of Sidi Barrani.
14	28 August 1941	18:00	Marseille's adversaries were 12 Hurricanes of No. 1 Squadron SAAF. Lieutenant V.F. Williams fighter crashed into the sea. Although injured he was rescued.
15–16	9 September 1941	17:12; 17:18	Claim: Two Hurricanes southeast of Bardia.
17	13 September 1941	17:25	Claim: Hurricane south of Bardia.
17	13 September 1941	17:25	This appears to have been Flt Lt Patrick (Pat) Byers (RAF) of No. 451 Squadron RAAF. (Note: Flight Lieutenant Patrick Joseph Anthony Byers, a 25-year-old RAF officer serving with No. 451 Squadron under Article XV of the British Commonwealth Air Training Plan, died on 20 September 1941 and is buried in Benghazi (Commonwealth War Graves Commission, "Byers, Patrick Joseph Anthony"). He may have been from South Africa, as his parents resided there. Robert Tate, quoting Geoffrey Morley-Mower, DFC, AFC (a pilot with No. 451 Squadron at the time), states that Byers was one of Marseille's victims. Walter Wübbe states that Byers was in Hurricane I V7775. However, another source states that V7775 was not among the 10 Mk I Hurricanes assigned to No. 451 Squadron, although V7772 and V7779 were (ADF Serials).) Byers took off alone and was engaged and shot down by two Bf 109s on the afternoon of 13 September. Later that afternoon two Bf 109s overflew No. 451 Squadron's base and dropped a note informing them that Byers had survived, but was badly burned. A couple of weeks later, two Bf 109s flew through AA fire and dropped another note, stating that Byers had died of his wounds. It is thought that Marseille was one of the pilots.
18	14 September 1941	17:46	Claim: Hurricane southeast of Sofafi.
18	14 September 1941	17:46	Marseille's opponents were Hurricanes from No. 33 Squadron RAF on an escort mission for Martin Marylands from No. 24 Squadron SAAF. His victim was Sergeant Nourse who bailed out. Three Hurricanes were lost in combat with 12 Bf 109s and six Fiat G.50 Freccias. The Italians and Germans combined claims were three Hurricanes in this encounter.
19–23	24 September 1941♠	13:30; 16.45; 16:47; 16:51; 17:00	Claim: A Martin Maryland near Gambut and four Hurricanes near Buq Buq.
19–23	24 September 1941♠	13:30; 16.45; 16:47; 16:51; 17:00	Nine Hurricanes were from No. 1 Squadron SAAF and nine were from an unidentified unit. The South Africans lost a total of three Hurricanes. Captain C. A. van Vliet and 2nd Lieutenant J. MacRobert returned unhurt while Lieutenant B. E. Dold remains missing. I./JG 27 claimed six aerial victories in this engagement. It is possible that the unidentified aircraft were Mk IIB Tomahawks of No. 112 Squadron RAF. This unit was bounced by a Bf 109, while returning from a shipping escort mission. Pilot Officer Jerry Westenra, a New Zealander and a future ace, bailed out. However, some sources state that Westenra was shot down the following day and/or by Gerhard Homuth.
24–25	12 October 1941	08:12; 08:15	Claim: Two P-40s near Bir Sheferzan.
24–25	12 October 1941	08:12; 08:15	JG 27 aircraft encountered 24 Mk IIB Tomahawks, belonging to No. 2 Squadron SAAF and the Royal Australian Air Force (RAAF) No. 3 Squadron. The Australians lost three aircraft, while the South Africans reported one loss plus one severely damaged. I./JG 27 claimed four aerial victories in this engagement. Marseille's victims were likely Flying Officer H. G. "Robbie" Roberts and Sgt Derek Scott, both of No. 3 Squadron. Roberts made a forced landing inside Allied lines and his aircraft was later repaired. Scott crash landed his badly damaged aircraft at his base.
26	5 December 1941	15:25	Claim: Hurricane.
26	5 December 1941	15:25	The adversaries were 20 Hurricanes of No. 274 Squadron RAF and No. 1 Squadron SAAF. Both squadrons reported the loss of one aircraft. I./JG 27 reported two aerial victories in this engagement. I./JG 27 and II./JG 27 claimed two Hurricanes each: Noel Sandilands from No. 1 Squadron and one No. 274 Squadron Hurricane were shot down. Marseille and Homuth were likely responsible. Sandilands was killed; another No. 1 Squadron force-landed. No. 274 Squadron were recorded as damaged or destroyed.
27–28	6 December 1941	12:10; 12:25	Claim: Two Hurricanes south and south-southeast of El Adem.
27–28	6 December 1941	12:10; 12:25	The adversaries were 24 Hurricanes from No. 229 Squadron RAF and No. 238 Squadron RAF. These units lost five Hurricanes in combat with Bf 109s in the vicinity of Bir el Gobi. No. 274 Squadron was present but sustained no casualties.
29	7 December 1941	09:30	Claim: Hurricane 20 km (12 mi) west of Sidi Omar.
29	7 December 1941	09:30	JG 27 fought Hurricanes from No. 274 Squadron RAF, which lost three fighters in combat with 15 Ju 87s, six Bf 109s, 12 MC 202s and MC 200s. The Italians and Germans claimed three aerial victories in this engagement. His opponent was Flight Lieutenant Hobbs.
30	8 December 1941	08:15	Claim: P-40 25 km (16 mi) southeast of El Adem.
30	8 December 1941	08:15	Marseille's opponents were misidentified Hurricanes. No. 33 Squadron RAF Flying Officer Charles cash landed in Axis territory but was picked up by another Hurricane. No. 274 Squadron RAF lost Flying Officer O N Tracey and Sergeant Haines killed. Sergeant J P MacDonnell and Pilot Officer Thompson survived a crashed landing. A No. 3 Squadron RAAF P-40 was damaged; Sergeant Alves was unhurt. Zerstörergeschwader 26 and JG 27 claimed two each. Italian units claimed nine destroyed, two probably destroyed and nine damaged.
31	10 December 1941	08:50	Claim: P-40 southeast of El Adem.
31	10 December 1941	08:50	The victory was over a Tomahawk IIB from No. 2 Squadron SAAF. The pilot, Lieutenant B. G. S. Enslin, bailed out uninjured.
32	11 December 1941	09:30	Claim: P-40 southeast of Timimi.
32	11 December 1941	09:30	A Tomahawk IIB, AK457, of No. 250 Squadron RAF. The pilot, Flight Sergeant M. A. Canty, remains missing in action.
33–34	13 December 1941	16:00; 16:10	Claim: Two P-40s northeast of Martuba and northeast of Timimi.
33–34	13 December 1941	16:00; 16:10	One of his victories was a Tomahawk IIB, AM384 of No. 3 Squadron RAAF, piloted by Flying Officer Tommy Trimble, who was wounded and had to crash-land his aircraft. His second opponent was either 2nd Lieutenant Connel or Lieutenant Meek both from No. 1 Squadron SAAF.
35–36	17 December 1941	11:10; 11:28	Claim: Two P-40s west-northwest of Martuba and southeast of the Bay of Gazala.
35–36	17 December 1941	11:10; 11:28	Marseille's opponents were eight misidentified Hurricanes of No. 1 Squadron SAAF on an escort missions for eight Bristol Blenheim from No. 14 Squadron RAF and No. 84 Squadron RAF. I./JG 27 claimed five aerial victories in this engagement. Lieutenants Hojem, O'Reilly and Barclay were all killed, and the aircraft of Captain van Vliet and Lieutenant Biden were badly damaged. Sergeant Browne of the same unit suffered serious damage to his aircraft and force-landed at El Adem.
– 1942 –
37–40	8 February 1942	08:22; 08:25; 14:20; 14:30	Claim: Four P-40s east-northeast of Martuba, 20 km (12 mi) north of Martuba, northwest of Bomba Bay and over the sea northeast of Bomba Bay.
37–40	8 February 1942	08:22; 08:25; 14:20; 14:30	The first action took place directly over the airfield at Martuba. The first victory was a Flight Sergeant Hargreaves, who was taken prisoner. It seems that Marseille's third victory was mistakenly identified as a P-40. The victim was most likely a Hurricane IIB, Z5312, of No. 73 Squadron RAF, piloted by Flight Sergeant Alwyn Sands (RAAF), who also crash-landed. Marseille's 39th and 40th claims were made in combat with No. 112 Squadron RAF over Gulf of Bomba at 14:20 and 14:30. Sergeant A. T. Tonkin of No. 112 Squadron was killed. Sergeants G.W Elwell and B P Hoare were posted missing. The 10 claims made by JG 27 exactly matched Allied losses.
41–44	12 February 1942	13:30; 13:32; 13:33; 13:36	Claim: Four P-40s 10 km (6.2 mi) northwest of Tobruk, 20 km (12 mi) northwest of Tobruk, 23 km (14 mi) northwest of Tobruk, and 35 km (22 mi) west-northwest of Tobruk.
41–44	12 February 1942	13:30; 13:32; 13:33; 13:36	The Hurricanes came from No. 274 Squadron RAF. Marseille claimed four, and four aircraft were lost. Sergeant R. W. Henderson crashed south of Tobruk and Sergeant Parbury bailed out with his parachute; both of them were uninjured. Pilot Officer S. E. van der Kuhle crashed his Hurricane IIA DG616 into the sea. Flight Lieutenant Smith (Hurricane IIB BD821) did not return from this mission and remains missing in action. The surviving pilots were under the impression they were shot down by ground-fire. This cause was given in the official record. Flight Lieutenant Smith purportedly crashed while pursued by a Macchi C.200 from an unknown Italian unit. Six RAF fighters were lost on this date, including those reported lost to ground-fire; seven were claimed by JG 27.
45–46	13 February 1942	09:20; 09:25	Claim: Two Hurricanes 20 km (12 mi) southeast and 23 km (14 mi) east/southeast of Tobruk.
45–46	13 February 1942	09:20; 09:25	Marseille's adversaries were seven Hurricanes from No. 1 Squadron SAAF and No. 274 Squadron RAF. These units lost in aerial combat with three Bf 109 fighters in the vicinity of Tobruk. I./JG 27 claimed three aerial victories in this engagement. Marseille's first victory was Lieutenant Le Roux; the South African crashed his burning Hurricane but escaped the wreck, although he was injured. His aircraft exploded damaging Marseille's Yellow 14, causing its engine to stop. Marseille crash landed. Marseille then spotted Lt. Herbet's Hurricane and shot it down as he glided down to land.
47–48	15 February 1942	13:00; 13:03	Claim: Two P-40s 3 km (1.9 mi) west-southwest and 5 km (3.1 mi) southwest of Gambut.
47–48	15 February 1942	13:00; 13:03	Kittyhawk Is from No. 3 Squadron RAAF, near Gambut airfield. The Kittyhawks were bounced by two Bf 109s during takeoff. Marseille's first victory was Kittyhawk I AK594; Pilot Officer P. J. "Tommy" Briggs, bailed out at an altitude of 100 m and was injured. The second victory was Kittyhawk I AK605: Flight Sergeant F. B. (Frank) Reid was killed when it crashed.
49–50	21 February 1942	12:10; 12:18	Claim: Two P-40s 10 km (6.2 mi) west and 20 km (12 mi) northeast of Fort Acroma.
49–50	21 February 1942	12:10; 12:18	Marseille's opponents were 11 Kittyhawks I from No. 112 Squadron RAF, which lost three aircraft in aerial combat with six Bf 109s. I./JG 27 reported three aerial victories in this engagement.
51–52	27 February 1942	12:00; 12:12	Claim: Two P-40s 10 km (6.2 mi) east-northeast of Ain el Gazala and 10 km (6.2 mi) east-northeast of Fort Acroma.
51–52	27 February 1942	12:00; 12:12	Probably Mk I Kittyhawks belonging to No. 3 Squadron RAAF: Sergeant Roger Jennings, in AK665 was killed while crash landing; Pilot Officer R. C. (Dick) Hart in AK689 bailed out and returned to his unit.
53–54	25 April 1942	10:06; 10:09	Claim: Two P-40s 2 km (1.2 mi) and 10 km (6.2 mi) north of the Italian airfield at Ain el Gazala.
53–54	25 April 1942	10:06; 10:09	Opponents were Kittyhawks I from No. 260 Squadron RAF and Tomahawks IIB from No. 2 Squadron SAAF and No. 4 Squadron SAAF. These units had the following losses in this engagement: three Tomahawks and one Kittyhawk missing (one pilot later returned wounded), two Kittyhawks and two Tomahawks crash landed after aerial combat, and one heavily damaged and one lightly damaged Kittyhawk. On the German side I./JG 27 reported five P-40s, II./JG 27 three P-40s shot down. The combat reports indicate that Marseille's opponents were Kittyhawks from No. 260 Squadron RAF. His opponents were Squadron Leader Hanbury who crash landed and Sergeant Wareham who was killed in action.
55–56	10 May 1942	09:13; 09:15	Claim: Two Hurricanes, 25 km (16 mi) southeast of Martuba airfield.
55–56	10 May 1942	09:13; 09:15	The Hurricanes belonged to No. 40 Squadron SAAF and were on a patrol mission. Both pilots, Captain Cobbledick and Lieutenant Flesker were posted missing in action. The first victory was a Hurricane I, serial number Z4377.
57–58	13 May 1942	10:10; 10:15	Claim: Two P-40s, 16 km (9.9 mi) southeast of Ain el Gazala and 14 km (8.7 mi) east-northeast of Gazala Bay.
57–58	13 May 1942	10:10; 10:15	On this occasion, 12 Mk I Kittyhawks from No. 3 Squadron RAAF were bounced by two Bf 109s coming from the sun. Flying Officer H. G. (Graham) Pace, flying Kittyhawk I AL172, was killed by a bullet in the head. Sergeant Colin McDiarmid bailed out, injured from his Kittyhawk I AK855. Flying Officer Geoff Chinchen reported that he damaged a Messerschmitt and Marseille's aircraft was hit in the oil tank and propeller on this occasion.
59–60	16 May 1942	18:05; 18:15	Claim: Two P-40s, 20 km (12 mi) east of Ain el Gazala and 3 km (1.9 mi) east of Fort Acroma.
59–60	16 May 1942	18:05; 18:15	Following the first action, Sergeant E. V. Teede of No. 3 Squadron RAAF crash landed his burning Mk I Kittyhawk, AL120, west of El Adem and returned to his unit uninjured. The second combat involved four Mk I Kittyhawks of No. 450 Squadron RAAF. Pilot Officer Dudley Parker bailed out uninjured. His pilotless fighter, AK697, crashed into Kittyhawk AK604, flown by Sergeant W. J. Metherall. Both aircraft were lost in the crash and Metherall was killed in action. Marseille only observed Parker bailing out and therefore claimed only two victories.
61–62	19 May 1942	07:20; 07:30	Claim: Two P-40s, 8 km (5.0 mi) southwest and 5 km (3.1 mi) south of Fort Acroma.
61–62	19 May 1942	07:20; 07:30	These were Kittyhawks from No. 450 Squadron RAAF. The Kittyhawk I AK842, piloted by Flight Sergeant Ivan Young, was hit in the engine. Young crash-landed without injury to himself; his fighter was destroyed by a resultant fire. Young managed to make it back to Allied lines.
63–64	23 May 1942	11:05; 11:06	Claim: Two Douglas Boston, 3 km (1.9 mi) and 4 km (2.5 mi) southeast of Tobruk harbour.
63–64	23 May 1942	11:05; 11:06	These were really Mk I Martin Baltimores, of No. 223 Squadron RAF. Four Baltimores attacked the airport at Derna, without a fighter escort and three (AG703, AG708 and AG717) were shot down. The fourth bomber crash-landed on its return flight. I./JG 27 claimed four aerial victories that day.
65	30 May 1942	06:05	Claim: P-40 1 km (0.62 mi) northwest of El Adem.
65	30 May 1942	06:05	Marseille's adversaries were 20 Mk I Kittyhawks of No. 250 Squadron RAF and No. 450 Squadron RAAF, who were attacked by four Bf 109s between Tobruk and El Adem. The Kittyhawk I AK704 of No. 250 Squadron RAF started burning and crashed. Sergeant Graham Buckland (RAAF) bailed out, but his parachute failed to open.
66–68	31 May 1942	07:26; 07:28; 07:34	Claim: Three P-40s 5 km (3.1 mi) and 8 km (5.0 mi) west of Bir-el Harmat, and 10 km (6.2 mi) southwest of Fort Acroma.
66–68	31 May 1942	07:26; 07:28; 07:34	These P-40s probably belonged to No. 5 Squadron SAAF; one of the pilots was Major Andrew Duncan (5.5 claims), who was killed.
69	1 June 1942	19:15	Claim: P-40 20 km (12 mi) east-northeast of El Cheimar.
69	1 June 1942	19:15	Pilot Officer Collet, No. 213 Squadron RAF, in a Hurricane, was shot down. He was Marseille's misidentified P-40. Collet was pursued for 20 minutes before being shot down.
70–75	3 June 1942♠	12:22; 12:25; 12:27; 12:28; 12:29; 12:33	Claim: Six P-40s 3 km (1.9 mi) west, 5 km (3.1 mi) west, 5 km (3.1 mi) west, 7 km (4.3 mi) west, 10 km (6.2 mi) west, and 7 km (4.3 mi) west of Bir Hakeim.
70–75	3 June 1942♠	12:22; 12:25; 12:27; 12:28; 12:29; 12:33	From left to right: Robin Pare, Jack Frost and Andrew Duncan, March/April 1942 Credited with six in 11 minutes against nine Mk IIB Tomahawks of No. 5 Squadron SAAF, which were engaged in aerial combat with Ju 87s and Bf 109s near Bir Hakeim. Among the South African losses were four shot down Tomahawks (Tomahawk IIB AK384, AK421, AM401 and AN262) and two heavily damaged Tomahawks. Robin Pare was killed in this action; Captain RL Morrison, Lieutenant VS Muir and 2nd Lieutenant CA Cecil Golding were wounded. 2nd Lieutenant M Martin crash landed in the fortress of Bir Hacheim and returned. Captain Louis C Botha made an emergency landing at Gambut. Three of Marseille's adversaries were SAAF aces: Cecil Golding, Robin Pare and Louis C Botha.
76–77	7 June 1942	16:10; 16:13	Claim: Two P-40s southwest and 10 km (6.2 mi) northeast of El Adem.
76–77	7 June 1942	16:10; 16:13	Marseille's adversaries were two Kittyhawk Mk Is, from No. 2 Squadron SAAF. The two fighters (AK611 and AK628) were lost in combat. Lieutenant Frewen bailed out from his burning aircraft and was uninjured. Lieutenant Leonard James Peter Berrangé was killed in the action.
78–81	10 June 1942	07:35; 07:41; 07:45; 07:50	Claim: Four P-40s 5 km (3.1 mi) northwest Mteifel Chebir, 6 km (3.7 mi) northeast Mteifel Chebir, 6 km (3.7 mi) east Mteifel Chebir, and 6 km (3.7 mi) east-northeast Mteifel Chebir.
78–81	10 June 1942	07:35; 07:41; 07:45; 07:50	Among the opponents were 24 Hurricanes from No. 73 Squadron RAF and 213 Squadron. These two units lost four Hurricanes in aerial combat with Bf 109s in the vicinity of Bir Hacheim. Since II./JG 27 reported aerial combat with 40 to 50 P-40s, further Allied units are likely to have been involved. It seems certain that Marseille's fourth victory was Hurricane IIB BM966 from No. 213 Squadron RAF. Pilot Officer A. J. Hancock crash landed near El Gubbi, after he was chased for more than 30 km. On the German side I./JG 27 reported the destruction of seven P-40s while II./JG 27 claimed one Hurricane.
82–83	11 June 1942	16:25; 16:35	Claim: One P-40 southeast of Fort Acroma and one Hurricane 18 km (11 mi) northwest of El Adem.
82–83	11 June 1942	16:25; 16:35	Both were from No. 112 Squadron RAF, which lost two Kittyhawks. One adversary was Sergeant Graves who bailed out.
84–87	13 June 1942	18:10; 18:11; 18:14; 18:15	Claim: Three P-40s and a Hurricane 5 km (3.1 mi) west, 3 km (1.9 mi) northwest, 2 km (1.2 mi) north-northeast, and 3 km (1.9 mi) east-northeast of El Adem.
84–87	13 June 1942	18:10; 18:11; 18:14; 18:15	On this mission, I./JG 27 claimed three P-40s and two Hurricanes near El Adem/Gazala. Marseille claimed four and Leutnant Hans Remmer one. These were P-40s from No. 450 Squadron RAAF; no Hurricanes were involved and only four aircraft were lost but another South African aircraft sustained heavy damage and crash-landed at base. Flight Sergeant Bill Halliday (AL127) and Flt Sgt Roy Stone (RAF) in AK952 were both killed in action. Pilot Officer Osborne (AL106) crash landed and was picked up by the army.
88–91	15 June 1942	18:01; 18:02; 18:04; 18:06	Claim: Four P-40s, 6 km (3.7 mi) northwest, 4 km (2.5 mi) north-northwest, 8 km (5.0 mi) northeast, and 3 km (1.9 mi) north-northeast of El Adem.
88–91	15 June 1942	18:01; 18:02; 18:04; 18:06	Marseille was credited with four in five minutes, including a P-40 near El Adem. The Allied unit remains unidentified. I./JG 27 claimed six aerial victories in combat with 12 P-40s. No corresponding losses are known amongst Allied units. JG 27 reported all four claims were witnessed by 3 Staffel.
92–95	16 June 1942	18:02; 18:10; 18:11; 18:13	Claim: A Hurricane and three P-40s, 17 km (11 mi) southwest, 5 km (3.1 mi) east, 5 km (3.1 mi) north-northeast, and 10 km (6.2 mi) north of El Adem
92–95	16 June 1942	18:02; 18:10; 18:11; 18:13	No. 5 Squadron SAAF lost two: Lt. R. C. Derham flying a Tomahawk IIb (AK370) was captured (POW Stalag Luft III) and the highest-scoring member of an SAAF squadron during the war, Major John "Jack" Frost, remains missing in action. 14 aircraft were lost, with nine damaged. Five pilots were killed and three posted missing, eleven safe. One was captured and three were wounded. A further pilot was killed in an accident.
96–101	17 June 1942♠	12:02; 12:04; 12:05; 12:08; 12:09; 12:12	Claim: Two P-40s, three Hurricanes and a Spitfire, 5 km (3.1 mi) west, 3 km (1.9 mi) west, 4 km (2.5 mi) southwest, 6 km (3.7 mi) southwest, 5 km (3.1 mi) south Gambut, and southeast of Sidi Omar.
96–101	17 June 1942♠	12:02; 12:04; 12:05; 12:08; 12:09; 12:12	His adversaries were Mk I Kittyhawks of No. 112 Squadron RAF and No. 250 Squadron RAF, as well as 12 Mk IIC Hurricanes of No. 73 Squadron RAF. The first two victories were misidentified Mk IIC Hurricanes (BN121 and BN157) of No. 73 Squadron The pilots, Pilot Officer Stone and Flight Sergeant Goodwin, bailed out uninjured. The next two victories were Mk IIC Hurricanes (BN277 and BN456) also of No. 73 Squadron. Both pilots, Squadron Leader Derek Harland Ward. and Pilot Officer Woolley, were killed in action. Marseille's century which he identified as a Hurricane, appears to have been Flight Sergeant Roy Drew (RAAF) of No. 112 Squadron, in Kittyhawk I, AK586. Drew was separated from his flight and did not return. Marseille's final victory that day was a Spitfire Mk IV reconnaissance aircraft, BP916, flown by Pilot Officer Squires.
102–104	31 August 1942	10:03; 10:04; 18:25	Claim: Two Hurricanes, 23 km (14 mi) and 26 km (16 mi) south-south-east of El Alamein in the morning and one Spitfire 15 km (9.3 mi) east of El Alamein.
102–104	31 August 1942	10:03; 10:04; 18:25	Marseille claimed two Hurricanes in two minutes in the morning and a lone Spitfire at 18:25. Marseille reported the pilot parachuted out. Pilot Officer L. J. Barnes, 213 squadron, bailed out of his Hurricane IIC (BP451), but was severely wounded and died in a field hospital on 12 September 1942.
105–121	1 September 1942♠	08:26; 08:28; 08:35; 08:39; 10:55; 10:56; 10:58; 10:59; 11:01; 11:02; 11:03; 11:05; 17:47; 17:48; 17:49; 17:50; 17:53	Claim: Three P-40s, a Spitfire, thirteen P-40s, 18 km (11 mi) south-southeast, 20 km (12 mi) south-southeast, 20 km (12 mi) south-southeast, and 20 km (12 mi) south-southeast of Imayid, 20 km (12 mi) south, 15 km (9.3 mi) southeast, 10 km (6.2 mi) southeast, 15 km (9.3 mi) southeast, 7 km (4.3 mi) east-southeast, 12 km (7.5 mi) east, 20 km (12 mi) east, and 23 km (14 mi) east of Alam Halfa, 7 km (4.3 mi) south, 8 km (5.0 mi) south, 6 km (3.7 mi) southeast, 9 km (5.6 mi) south-southeast, and 7 km (4.3 mi) south-southwest of Imayid.
105–121	1 September 1942♠	08:26; 08:28; 08:35; 08:39; 10:55; 10:56; 10:58; 10:59; 11:01; 11:02; 11:03; 11:05; 17:47; 17:48; 17:49; 17:50; 17:53	Marseille was credited with 17 victories in three separate sorties over El Taqua, Alam Halfa and Deir el Raghat. His adversaries on the early morning missions were Mk II Hurricanes (No. 1 Squadron SAAF and No. 238 Squadron RAF) and Mk V Spitfires (No. 92 Squadron RAF). Three pilots have been identified: one South African, Lieutenant Bailey, was injured in a crash landing, while Major P. R. C. Metelerkamp managed to fly his heavily damaged fighter back to his base. Flying Officer I. W. (Ian) Matthews of No. 238 Squadron was killed. Pilot Officer Bradley-Smith (No. 92 Squadron) bailed out of his burning Spitfire VC BR474. Bradley-Smith was uninjured. Among Marseille's adversaries during the midday combat were Mk IIB Tomahawks of No. 5 Squadron SAAF and Mk I Kittyhawks of No. 2 Squadron SAAF, to which was attached pilots of the 57th Fighter Group USAAF. (Note: It is not clear that P-40Fs, assigned to the 57th FG at the time, were involved; the unit was not officially operational until 6 October. However, individual USAAF personnel had been attached to DAF units since July.) Among the 2 SAAF casualties were Lieutenant Morrison (Kittyhawk I, ET575) was captured, Lieutenant W. L. O. Moon bailed out of his Kittyhawk I, EV366 and was uninjured. Second Lieutenant H E Ironside was killed. From 5 SAAF, Lieutenant G. B. Jack also remains missing in action. A Lieutenant Kearns' P-40 was damaged in a forced landing as was Lieutenant D W Murdoch, while Second Lieutenant H H Brown was killed. Six Allied fighters were shot down for one Axis loss. Marseille's evening opponents were Hurricanes from No. 213 Squadron RAF, of which Marseille claimed five shot down. Marseille's 117th official victory was over a Hurricane Mk IIB, BN273. The pilot, Sergeant A. Garrod, bailed out uninjured. Four more 213 aircraft were hit. Sergeant F G Potter was killed. His body was found in the desert and buried by the 10th Royal Hussars. Flying Officer R F Wollaston was killed, Pilot Officer J E Avise and Flight Sergeant P D Ross survived.
122–126	2 September 1942♠	09:16; 09:18; 09:24; 15:18; 15:21	Claim: Two P-40s and a Spitfire 25 km (16 mi) southeast, 30 km (19 mi) south-southeast, and 10 km (6.2 mi) south of Imayid in the morning; two P-40s 20 km (12 mi) and 18 km (11 mi) southeast of El Alamein in the afternoon.
122–126	2 September 1942♠	09:16; 09:18; 09:24; 15:18; 15:21	Marseille's adversaries on the early morning mission were Mk I Kittyhawks of No. 2 Squadron SAAF, including pilots from the US 57th Fighter Group and Mk II Hurricanes of No. 33 Squadron RAF. Marseille's first victory was over a Lt. Stuart of 2 SAAF. One of Marseille's victories was Lieutenant Mac M. McMarrell (USAAF) who crash-landed his fighter and was wounded in this engagement. It seems certain that one of Marseille's claim was over a misidentified Hurricane II, piloted by Pilot Officer G. R. Dibbs, who remains missing in action. Marseille's opponents in the afternoon combat were IIB Mk IIB Tomahawks of No. 5 Squadron SAAF. Marseille also shot down Lieutenant E. H. O. Carman (Tomahawk IIB AM390) and Lieutenant J. Lindbergh (Tomahawk Mk IIB, AM349) who remain missing in action.
127–132	3 September 1942♠	07:20; 07:23; 07:28; 15:08; 15:10; 15:42	Claim: A P-40 and two Spitfires and a P-40, early in the morning, 25 km (16 mi) southwest, 27 km (17 mi) southwest, and 30 km (19 mi) southwest of El Hammam. In the afternoon, three P-40s, one near and one 2 km (1.2 mi) southwest of Imayid, one 40 km (25 mi) south-southeast of El Alamein.
127–132	3 September 1942♠	07:20; 07:23; 07:28; 15:08; 15:10; 15:42	Marseille's adversaries in the early morning action were 24 Mk II Hurricanes, of No. 127 Squadron RAF and No. 274 Squadron RAF, 15 Mk I Kittyhawks of No. 260 Squadron RAF, No. 2 Squadron SAAF and No. 4 Squadron SAAF and eight Mk V Spitfires of No. 145 Squadron RAF. Pilots of the US 57th Fighter Group were attached to some of the above units. The pilot of the first aircraft destroyed by Marseille bailed out and appears to have been Sergeant M. Powers of No. 145 Squadron (Spitfire VB AB349), who was wounded in the engagement. The two P-40s were piloted by W/O Stan Bernier of No. 260 Squadron, who was killed, and a Lt Ryneke of No. 2 Squadron SAAF. Marseille's Bf 109 was hit in this engagement. His likely opponent was James Francis Edwards.
133–136	5 September 1942	10:48; 10:49; 10:51; 11:00	Claim: Three Spitfires and a P-40, 13 km (8.1 mi) southeast and southeast of El Alamein, and south-southeast and south-southeast of Imayid.
133–136	5 September 1942	10:48; 10:49; 10:51; 11:00	Marseille was credited with four enemy aircraft, despite a cannon malfunction, near the Ruweisat Ridge and El Taqua. Flight Lieutenant Canham and Pilot Officer Bicksler of No. 145 Squadron RAF both bailed out of their Spitfire Vs. One of them was Marseille's first claim. Mk I Kittyhawks of No. 112 Squadron RAF and No. 450 Squadron RAAF were also involved in this engagement.
137–140	6 September 1942	17:03; 17:14; 17:16; 17:20	Claim: Three P-40s and a Spitfire southeast, south-southwest, south-southwest, and south-southwest of El Alamein.
137–140	6 September 1942	17:03; 17:14; 17:16; 17:20	Among Marseille's opponents were eight Mk I Kittyhawks of No. 260 Squadron RAF, Mk IIB Tomahawks of No. 5 Squadron SAAF to which was attached pilots of the US 64th Fighter Squadron (57th Fighter Group). No. 260 Squadron lost one Kittyhawk and a second fighter was damaged. No. 5 Squadron SAAF reported three losses and a fourth Tomahawk was damaged beyond repair. No. 7 Squadron SAAF lost five Hurricanes. It is unknown whether the Americans reported losses I./JG 27 claimed five aerial victories in action against 20 P-40s; II./JG 27 reported aerial combat with 23 P-40s, claiming one victory. III./JG 53 claimed one P-40 in combat with 12 P-40s and six Spitfires. Marseille's 137th victim was Pilot Officer Dick Dunbar, who was reported as missing after the action.
141–142	7 September 1942	17:43; 17:45	Claim: Two P-40s southeast of El Alamein and 10 km (6.2 mi) southwest of El Hammam.
141–142	7 September 1942	17:43; 17:45	Marseille's opponents were Mk I Kittyhawks of No. 4 Squadron SAAF and Mk IIB Tomahawks from No. 5 Squadron SAAF. The South Africans lost two Tomahawks and one Kittyhawk. Two further Tomahawks and one Kittyhawk sustained battle damage. I./JG 27 claimed four aerial victories in this engagement. Marseille's victims might have been Lt. Cowen and Mc Carthy were shot down. Homuth also claimed a victory. One of these men may have been Homuth's victory.
143–144	11 September 1942	07:40; 07:42	Claim: Two P-40s 15 km (9.3 mi) southeast of El Alamein and 5 km (3.1 mi) west-southwest of Imayid.
143–144	11 September 1942	07:40; 07:42	Marseille's opponents were likely Hurricanes II from No. 33 Squadron RAF and No. 213 Squadron RAF. No. 213 Squadron RAF reported the loss of Hurricane IIC BP381. Flight Sergeant S.R. Fry was shot down. I./JG 27 reported combat with 20 fighter bombers, an indication which points more to Hurricanes rather than Spitfires V from No. 145 Squadron RAF and No. 601 Squadron RAF, these were engaged with Ju 87s and Bf 109s at the same time.
145–151	15 September 1942♠	16:51; 16:53; 16:54; 16:57; 16:59; 17:01; 17:02	Claim: Seven P-40s, 25 km (16 mi) southwest, 28 km (17 mi) southwest, 27 km (17 mi) southwest, 26 km (16 mi) southwest, 20 km (12 mi) southwest, 18 km (11 mi) southwest, 19 km (12 mi) southwest of El Alamein.
145–151	15 September 1942♠	16:51; 16:53; 16:54; 16:57; 16:59; 17:01; 17:02	Marseille was credited with seven P-40s in 11 minutes. JG 27 reported combat with 36 Kittyhawks: 18 Bf 109s from I./JG 27 claimed 10 in this engagement, all of them over German-held territory; 15 Bf 109s from II./JG 27 claimed one victory and; 10 Bf 109s from III./JG 27 claimed eight P-40s and one Spitfire, four of them over German territory. However, the records of the individual Allied squadrons involved: No. 3 Squadron RAAF, No. 112 Squadron RAF, No. 250 Squadron RAF and No. 450 Squadron RAAF (comprising No. 239 Wing) show that their total losses to enemy action that day were only five P-40s. One of the P-40 pilots shot down was Sergeant Peter Ewing (No. 450 Squadron), who bailed out, was captured and spent a day as a guest of I./JG 27. Sgt Gordon Scribner (No. 3 Squadron Kittyhawk EV322 CV-I) was killed during this engagement. Further reported losses include: Jack Donald (No. 3 Squadron), whose Kittyhawk EV345 had its port aileron shot away and engine set on fire – he bailed out, landed on an Italian mess tent and became a POW; Sgt Cedric Young RNZAF (No. 112 Squadron), who may have been shot down by AA fire and; pilots named Thorpe (No. 250 Squadron) and Strong (No. 450 Squadron), who both also became POWs. Sgt Ken Bee (No. 3 Squadron) was wounded in action, but managed to get his damaged aircraft back to base, as did Pilot Officer Keith Kildey, with severe cannon damage to his tailplane.
152–158	26 September 1942♠	09:10; 09:13; 09:15; 09:16; 16:56; 16:59; 17:10	Claim: Seven claims near El Daba and south of El Hammam, including six Spitfires. (Note: Walter Wübbe lists the last three aerial victories at 15:56, 15:59 and 16:10 while authors Robert Tate, Jochen Prien, Peter Rodeike and Gerhard Stemmer state 16:56, 16:59 and 17:10.)
152–158	26 September 1942♠	09:10; 09:13; 09:15; 09:16; 16:56; 16:59; 17:10	Marseille's adversaries on an early morning mission were Mk II Hurricanes of No. 33 Squadron RAF and No. 213 Squadron RAF, plus eight Mk V Spitfires of No. 92 Squadron RAF. It seems certain that Marseille's first victory was over a misidentified Hurricane IIC, BN186, flown by Pilot Officer C. Luxton, who crash-landed his aircraft. Marseille's last victory was Pilot Officer D. Turvey, who bailed out of his Spitfire VC, BR494. Marseille's adversaries in his last aerial combat, that afternoon, included 11 Spitfires from No. 145 Squadron RAF and No. 601 Squadron RAF. However, no British losses were documented on this mission. Aside from Turvey and Luxton, the only other Desert Air Force casualty was Warrant Officer W. F. Kenwood from 92 Squadron, who was posted missing. Only Marseille and Schlang claimed on this date; eight aircraft in total. Schlang claimed a solitary Spitfire.

== Veracity of claims ==
Some serious discrepancies between Allied squadron records and German claims have caused some historians and Allied veterans to question the accuracy of Marseille's official victories, in addition to those of JG 27 as a whole. With respect to Marseille, attention has often focused on the claims from two days in particular: 1 and 15 September 1942.

A United States Air Force historian, Major Robert Tate, found that Marseille's career can be corroborated 65–70 per cent; as many as 50 of his claims may not have actually been aerial victories. (Note: Tate found similar corroboration rates for Allied pilots during the same period: Clive Caldwell (50% to 60% corroboration), Billy Drake (70% to 80% corroboration), John Lloyd Waddy (70% to 80% corroboration) and Nicky Barr (60% to 70% corroboration))

Of 26 claims made by JG 27 on 1 September 1942, 17 were claimed by Marseille alone. Tate points out that Allied military sources and historians, for many years, had not acknowledged the loss of any aircraft in North Africa on that date. However, according to Tate, the Allies did lose "more than 17 aircraft that day ... in the area that Marseille operated." Tate found that 20 RAF/SAAF single-engined fighters and one twin-engine fighter were destroyed and several others severely damaged, as well as one USAAF P-40 shot down. Christopher Shores and Hans Ring also support Tate's conclusions. British historian Stephen Bungay gives a figure of 20 Allied losses that day.

The claims for 15 September 1942 are in serious doubt, following the first detailed scrutiny of the records of individual Allied squadrons by Australian historian Russell Brown. Brown gives three occasions on which Marseille could not have downed as many aircraft as claimed. Christopher Shores et al say that Marseille over-claimed on occasion, particularly in September 1942. They concluded Marseille had developed such a supreme confidence in his ability his mentality dictated, "If I fire at it, it must go down." They estimate two-thirds to three-quarters of his claims were aircraft that were destroyed, crash-landed or at least were heavily damaged.
