= RAF El Bassa =

RAF El Bassa
- Betzet, Northern District in Israel

Site information
- Type: Royal Air Force station
- Owner: Air Ministry
- Operator: Royal Air Force
- Controlled by: RAF Mediterranean and Middle East

Location
- Shown within Israel
- Coordinates: 33°04′16″N 035°07′25″E

Site history
- Built: 1941
- In use: 1941 - 1948

Airfield information
- Elevation: 15 metres (49 ft) AMSL
Runways
Direction	Length and surface
08/26	1,020 metres (3,346 ft) Asphalt
13/31	905 metres (2,969 ft) Asphalt

Royal Air Force El Bassa or more simply RAF El Bassa is a former Royal Air Force station located west of Betzet, Northern District, Israel.

== Units ==
The following squadrons were here at some point:

- Detachment from No. 6 Squadron RAF between September 1943 and February 1944 with the Hawker Hurricane IV
- Detachment from No. 73 Squadron RAF between July and August 1942 with the Hurricane IIC
- No. 80 Squadron RAF between 22 September and 13 October 1942 with the Hurricane IIC
- No. 208 Squadron RAF between 16 November 1943 and 7 January 1944 with the Hurricane IIA/IIB, re-equipping with the Supermarine Spitfire VC
- No. 260 Squadron RAF between August and October 1941 with the Hurricane I
- No. 450 Squadron RAAF between 4 and 19 August 1941 with the Hurricane I
- No. 451 Squadron RAAF between February and October 1942 with the Hurricane I

== See also ==
- List of former Royal Air Force stations
