= Ain el Gazala Airfield Complex =

Ain el Gazala Airfield Complex
- Ain el Gazala, Northern Cyrenaica in Libya

Site information
- Type: Military airfield complex
- Operator: Luftwaffe; Regia Aeronautica; Royal Air Force

Location
- Shown within Libya Ain el Gazala (Mediterranean)
- Coordinates: 32°08′30″N 23°25′35″E

Site history
- Built: 1940
- In use: 1941-1942

Ain el Gazala Airfield Complex, also known as Gazala and Ayn al Ghazāla, is an abandoned airfield complex primarily used during World War II. It was located in Ain el Gazala in Northern Cyrenaica, located 62 kilometres (39 mi) WNW from Tobruk, Libya.

== History ==
In June 1940, Ain el Gazala Airfield Complex was captured by Italy. In January 1941, the complex was evacuated by Italians and then taken over by British forces. On 10 April, the complex was captured by German forces. In December 1941, 71 abandoned Axis aircraft, about half German, was found on the 3 landing grounds when they were overrun by British forces. On 13–14 June 1942, the complex was seized by advancing Axis forces, and Axis operations commenced once again. On 14–15 November, the complex was re-occupied by British forces. After capture, Ain el Gazala Airfield Complex was abandoned.

=== Ain el Gazala North ===
Location: 32°10′50″N 23°21′00″E

Ain el Gazala North (LG-149) was continuously operated by fighters, dive-bombers, and transports in North Africa. In 1940–41, the runway measuring 1065 x 980 meters consisted of a natural surface of stone, sand, and clay. It was later expanded to 1280 x 1280 meters with an irregular shape. Fuel was stored underground, and there was an old fort located 2 km from the southwestern corner of landing ground in use. There were 3 barracks-type huts and 19 blast bay aircraft shelters dispersed along the eastern and southern boundaries by December 1941.

=== Ain el Gazala South ===
Location: 32°08′30″N 23°25′35″E

Ain el Gazala South (LG-151) was continuously operated by fighters, dive-bombers, and other medium-sized aircraft to facilitate war operations in North Africa. It consisted of two stone surface runways measuring approximately 1100 x 455 meters and 915 x 640 meters laid in an “L” shape. The landing ground had an underground operations bunker and 37 blast bay aircraft shelters laid along the perimeter by October 1941.

=== Ain el Gazala No. 3 ===
Location: 32°08′30″N 23°26′35″E

Ain el Gazala No. 3 (LG-152) was built in fall of 1941 as a satellite to Ain el Gazala South airfield. It consisted of a natural stone runway measuring approximately 1545 x 1125 meters. There were 9 blast bay aircraft shelters built with stone laid alon the perimeter by December 1941.

=== Mersa Ain el Gazala ===
Location: 32°10′00″N 23°19′00″E

Mersa Ain el Gazala, also known as Gazala Bay, is a seaplane anchorage located on the shore of a long narrow bay. There were well sheltered shallow waters with a bottom of mud, wood and sand. There was a heavily constructed wooden pier, and 3 huts with concrete floors located 1.2 km from the pier that could be used for accommodations. Throughout the war, there were no seaplane units reported to be stationed here.

== Units ==
The following units based at Ain el Gazala Airfield Complex:

Luftwaffe

- 2.(H)/Aufkl.Gr. 14 (part of) – Apr 1941
- I./JG 27 – Apr – Dec 1941, Jun 1942
- Kurierstaffel Afrika – Apr – Aug 1941
- Verbindungsstaffel/Fliegerführer Afrika – Jun, Jul, Nov 1941
- 7./JG 26 – Jun – Sep 1941
- 1. Wüstennotstaffel – Jun/Jul – Dec 1941
- 1./NJG 3 – Aug – Sep 1941
- II./JG 27 – Sep – Dec 1941
- 10./KG z.b.V. 1 – Nov 1941
- III./JG 27 – Jun 1942
- 10.(Jabo)/JG 27 – Jun 1942
- III./JG 53 – Jun 1942

Regia Aeronautica

- 114° Gruppo BT – Oct 1940 – c. Jan 1941
- 54° Gruppo BT – Jun 1940
- 23° Gruppo CT – Jan 1941
- 73° Gruppo OA – Mar 1941
- 129a Squadriglia OA – Mar 1941
- 278a Squadriglia Sil – Jan – Feb 1941
- 376a Squadriglia Assalto – Aug – Nov 1941
- 8° Gruppo CT – Jun – Jul 1942
- 13° Gruppo CT – Jun 1942

Royal Air Force

- No. 33 Squadron RAF
- No. 45 Squadron RAF
- No. 55 Squadron RAF
- No. 73 Squadron RAF
- No. 80 Squadron RAF
- No. 94 Squadron RAF
- No. 112 Squadron RAF
- No. 216 Squadron RAF
- No. 229 Squadron RAF
- No. 238 Squadron RAF
- No. 250 (Sudan) Squadron RAF
- No. 260 Squadron RAF
- No. 274 Squadron RAF
- No. 450 Squadron RAAF

== Raids ==
- On 16 December 1940, Bristol Blenheims attacked the airfield, destroying 1 stationary Ca.133 bomber-transport.
- On 1 January 1941, RAF Vickers Wellingtons bombed the airfield, destroying 1 S.M.79 and leaving 2 more damaged.
- On 5 January 1941, 2 RAF Hawker Hurricanes launched a low-level attack, claiming 2 S.M.79s destroyed. On this week, the airfield was evacuated and captured by British forces.
- On the night of 16 April 1941, the complex was subjected to naval gunfire.
- On 19 April 1941, RAF Bristol Blenheims launched a low-level attack, destroying 1 Ju 52 of the 2.(H)/Aufkl.Gr. 14 on the ground. The attack also killed 4 and wounded 10 personnel.
- On 9 June 1941, RAF hurricanes launched a low-level attack, claiming 6 Bf 109s and Fiat G.50s set on fire.
- On 12 June 1941, 2 Bf 109 E-7s from I./JG 27 were bombed, leaving them damaged on the ground.

== See also ==
- Belandah Airfield Complex, similar military installation in Libya.
- Agedabia Airfield Complex, also a similar military installation in Libya.
