= Sidi Azeiz Airfield =

Abandoned World War II airfield in Libya

Sidi Azeiz Airfield LG-148
- Arabic: مطار سيدي عزيز
- Bardia, Butnan District in Libya

Site information
- Type: Airfield
- Code: LG-148
- Operator: United States Army Air Forces; Royal Air Force
- Controlled by: Ninth Air Force; RAF Middle East Command

Location
- Shown within Libya
- Coordinates: 31°44′49″N 024°56′59″E

Site history
- Built: 1941
- In use: 1941 - 1943

Sidi Azeiz Airfield, or Sidi Azeis is an abandoned World War II military airfield in the eastern desert of Libya. It was located southwest of Bardia, Butnan District, Libya and near the Egypt–Libya border near Jabbanat Sidi, about 100 km east of Tobruk. German Coordinates are given as 31°40′00″N 24°54′00″E

It was used by the United States Army Air Force Ninth Air Force during the Western Desert campaign (named due to the stretch of the Sahara in Egypt being called the Western Desert) by the British Eighth Army, which the 57th Fighter Group, flew Curtiss P-40 Warhawks from on 12–13 November 1942.

The airfield was likely a compacted desert dirt flight strip, and was abandoned as the Allied forces moved west towards Tobruk. Close examination aerial photography of the hard desert about 10 miles west of Burdi shows some evidence of disturbance which could indicate where it existed.

== History ==
The following RAF squadrons were here at some point:

- No. 33 Squadron RAF between 17 and 18 June 1942 with the Hawker Hurricane IIB
- Detachment from No. 38 Squadron RAF between December 1940 and August 1941 with the Vickers Wellington IC
- No. 112 Squadron RAF between 17 and 18 June 1942 with the Curtiss Kittyhawk IA
- No. 208 Squadron RAF initially between 8 February and 27 March 1942 with the Hurricane I then between 15 May and 15 June 1942 with the Hurricane IIA & IIB and the Curtiss Tomahawk IIB
- Detachment from No. 223 Squadron RAF between October 1941 and March 1942 with the Martin Maryland
- No. 260 Squadron RAF between 10 and 15 November 1942 with the Kittyhawk IIA
- No. 274 Squadron RAF between 10 January and 12 February 1941 with the Hurricane I
- No. 450 Squadron RAAF between 17 and 18 June 1942 with the Kittyhawk I
- No. 451 Squadron RAAF between 24 December 1941 and 27 January 1942 with the Hurricane I

== See also ==
- List of North African airfields during World War II
- Operation Crusader
