= Desert Warrior =

Desert Warrior or Desert Warriors may refer to:

- Desert Warrior, or Los amantes del desierto, 1957 film starring Ricardo Montalban
- Desert Warrior (1957 film), English title of an Italian film
- Tuareg – The Desert Warrior, 1984 Italian adventure-action film
- Desert Warrior (1988 film), an American post-nuclear action film by Jim Goldman, starring Lou Ferrigno and Shari Shattuck
- Innocence of Muslims, or Desert Warriors, a 2012 film
- Desert Warrior (2025 film), a Saudi Arabian film starring Anthony Mackie
- Kimber Desert Warrior, a model of Kimber Custom gun
- Desert Warriors, 2000 book by Russell Brown (author)
- Desert Warrior, 1995 memoir of Saudi prince Khaled bin Sultan and Patrick Seale
- Desert Warrior, horse that won the 1991 McDowell's Indian Derby
- Desert Warrior, a Kuwaiti version of the Warrior tracked armoured vehicle
- Desert Warrior, racing car built by Rally Raid UK, participating in numerous Dakar Rally events
