= Killing of John Williams =

Killing of John Williams may refer to:

- John Williams (missionary), killed and eaten by cannibals in 1839
- John Edwin Ashley Williams, murdered by the Gestapo in 1944
- Killing of John T. Williams, by a police officer in 2010
