= Agedabia Airfield Complex =

Workd War II airfield complex in Libya

Agedabia Airfield Complex Jedabya East/West Flugplatz
- Ajdabiya, Al Wahat District in Libya

Site information
- Type: Military airfield complex
- Operator: Luftwaffe; Regia Aeronautica; Royal Air Force

Location
- Shown within Libya Agedabia (Mediterranean)
- Coordinates: 30°45′20″N 20°13′31″E

Site history
- Built: 1940
- In use: 1941–1942

Garrison information
- Garrison: Flugplatzkommando of Fliegerhorstkommandantur E 20/VI Derna

Agedabia Airfield Complex was an airfield complex, which consisted of two landing grounds and a satellite landing ground. It was located in Ajdabiya, Libya, and was heavily utilized by the Luftwaffe and Regia Aeronautica during the North African campaign.

== History ==
On April 4–5, 1941, the Luftwaffe begun operating at the Agedabia Airfield Complex after relocating from Sirte, Libya. On the morning of April 7, Royal Air Force Vickers Wellingtons bombed the airfield during a sandstorm, which damaged several German aircraft, including one destroyed Ju 87, and two other severely damaged Ju 87s. Four personnel were also reported to be wounded. On December 2, 1941, RAF Hawker Hurricanes strafed the airfield throughout the day. The RAF claimed to have destroyed or damaged nine CR.42s, four SM.79s, and one Ju 87. However, Italian records claim that only four C.R.42s were destroyed, with seven others damaged, along with one SM.81 transport. On December 5, 1941, six RAF Hurricanes attack the airfield again. The RAF claimed to have destroyed three CR.42s destroyed, five damaged, and two SM.79s destroyed. However, Italian records only confirmed the loss of two CR.42s, four damaged, and one SM.81 destroyed. On December 19, the Agedabia Airfield Complex was reported to be crowded with 75 single-engine German and Italian aircraft. From December 21–22, commandos from the RAF Special Air Service (SAS) raided the complex. They claimed the destruction of eight CR.42s, five Fiat G.50 Freccias, six Macchi C.200 Saettas, two Caproni Ca.311s, one SM.79, and two Caproni Ca.164 liaison planes. However, later sources confirmed that the actual number of destroyed aircraft was 18 rather than 24.

On January 3, 1942, a Bf 109F-4 Trop from the Jagdgeschwader 27 was blown up to prevent being captured by Allied forces. From January 4–5, the airfield complex was fully evacuated after facing heavy artillery shelling, however it was later recaptured by German forces. On November 14, 1942, RAF Hurricanes strafed the airfield, claiming the destruction of three CR.42s. By December, after ten months of limited activity, the complex became active once again as Axis forces withdrew towards Tripoli.

=== Agedabia East Airfield ===
Location: 30°45′30″N 20°14′30″E

The airfield consisted of two 1190 meter-long packed sand airstrips, which was reported to be soft in some spots. It was close to the Agedabia village. In December 1941, the airfield had six aircraft blast shelters on the Northwest side, and its support and service facilities were at Agedabia West.

=== Agedabia West Airfield ===
Location: 30°46′00″N 20°12′30″E

Agedabia West Airfield was operational from 1940 until 1942, and served as the main airfield of the complex. It was located close to the colonial fort. During rainy weather conditions, the runway was unserviceable. From 1940 to 1941, the airfield was heavily used by the Luftwaffe. In 1942, most units begun operating at the eastern airfield as it had much better runway conditions. In the same year, the roof of a hangar was destroyed during Allied air attacks.

The airfield had a medium double bay hangar located in the Western corner of the fort. Inside the fort included admin buildings, barracks, and a stores depot. The winds blew sand onto the runway, which piled up and formed bumps.

=== Agedabia Satellite ===
Location: 30°44′00″N 20°11′25″E

The landing ground was located 152.3 kilometres South of Benghazi in Libya. The longest runway was 1,070 meters long, consisting of packed sand, and had no facilities.

== Operational Units ==
The following operational units based in the airfield complex.

Regia Aeronautica:

- 6º Gruppo CT – 6th Fighter Group, January 1942
- 8º Gruppo CT – 8th Fighter Group, December 1941
- 209ª Squadriglia BaT – 209th Bomber Squadron, January - February 1942
- 236ª Squadriglia CB – 236th Dive Bomber Squadron November 1941, January - February 1942
- 375ª Squadriglia CT – 375th Fighter Squadron, December 1941

Luftwaffe:

- II./St.G. 2 – 2nd Group of Sturzkampfgeschwader 2 (2nd Dive Bomber Wing), April 1941, December 1941, January 1942
- Kurierstaffel Fliegerführer Afrika – Courier Squadron of the Air Leader Africa, December 1941 – January 1942
- III./JG 27 – 3rd Group of Jagdgeschwader 27 (27th Fighter Wing), December 1941 – February 1942
- I./St.G. 1 – 1st Group of Sturzkampfgeschwader 1 (1st Dive Bomber Wing), January 1942
- Stab, I., II./JG 27 – Headquarters, 1st and 2nd Groups of JG 27, January - February 1942
- Stab, I., II./St.G. 3 – Headquarters, 1st and 2nd Groups of StG 3 (3rd Dive Bomber Wing), based in Agedabia East, January - February 1942
- 7./ZG 26 – 7th Squadron of Zerstörergeschwader 26 (26th Destroyer Wing), bases in Agedabia West, January - February 1942
- 2.(H)/Aufkl.Gr. 14 – 2nd Squadron (Army Cooperation) of Aufklärungsgruppe 14 (14th Reconnaissance Group)

Agedabia West, January February 1942

- Wüstennotstaffel – Desert Emergency Squadron, based in Agedabia West, January - February 1942

Royal Air Force:

- No. 6 Squadron RAF
- No. 145 Squadron RAF
- No. 208 Squadron RAF

=== Station Commands ===
- Flugplatzkommando of Fliegerhorstkommandantur E 20/VI Derna – Airfield Command of Air Base Headquarters E 20/VI Derna, January/February - June 1942

=== Station Units ===
- Stab/Fliegerführer Afrika – Headquarters of the Air Leader Africa, April 1941, January 1942
- Koflug Afrika – Air Traffic Control Command Africa, April 1941, January - February 1942
- Luftgau Stab z.b.V. Afrika – Air District Staff for Special Purposes Africa, February - March 1942
- Elements of leichte Flak-Abteilung 841 (mot.) – Elements of 841st Light Anti-Aircraft Battalion (Motorized), May 1942
- kleine Flieger-Betriebsstoff-Kolonne 2/IV – Small Aviation Fuel Supply Column 2/IV, March 1942

== See also ==
- Belandah Airfield Complex, located 30 kilometres Southeast of Ajdabiya.
- Martuba Airfield Complex, similar military installation in Libya.
- Ain el Gazala Airfield Complex, also a similar military installation in Libya.
- Agedabia
