= Belandah Airfield Complex =

Abandoned Libyan airfield

Belandah Airfield Belaudah I II Flugplatz
- Ajdabiya, Al Wahat District in Libya

Site information
- Type: Military airfield complex
- Operator: Luftwaffe; United States Army Air Forces; Royal Air Force

Location
- Shown within Libya Belandah (Mediterranean)
- Coordinates: 30°34′45″N 020°24′00″E (Belaudah I Airfield); 30°33′30″N 020°26′00″E (Belaudah II Airfield)

Site history
- Built: 1941
- In use: 1941-1943

Belandah Airfield Complex, also known as Baheira Airfield Complex, is an abandoned military airfield complex which is located about 30 kilometres (19 mi) Southeast of Ajdabiya, Libya.

== History ==
The facility was built either by the Italian Regia Aeronautica or German Luftwaffe in June 1941. It consisted of two airfields, about 2.5 miles apart. During World War II, after the Axis defeat in Egypt during the Western Desert Campaign, the facility was abandoned by the retreating Axis forces.

It was later used by the United States Army Air Force during the North African Campaign by the 57th Fighter Group, which flew Curtiss P-40 Warhawks from the airfield between 3 December 1942 and 3 January 1943.

=== Belandah I ===
Location: 30°31′00″N 20°27′00″E

Belandah I, also known as Bel Audah faced little Axis usage, however in January 1942, Messerschmitt Bf 109 fighters operated by the Jagdgeschwader 27 was stationed. The airfield had two natural firm airstrips measuring 915 x 135 meters and 960 x 135 meters. It was named after the Belandah Hill, located approximately 14.5 kilometres from the airfield.

=== Belandah II ===
Location: 30°27′00″N 20°28′00″E

Belandah II also faced little Axis usage. The airfield consisted of two natural firm airstrips measuring 915 x 185 meters.

Today there are no remains of either airfield, the desert has completely reclaimed the facilities and runways. Their locations can only be determined by German maps of the area.

== Units ==
The following lists the units that were based at Belandah Airfield Complex:

United States Army Air Force

- 57th Fighter Group, 3 December 1942 - 3 January 1943, equipped with Curtiss P-40 Warhawks

Royal Air Force

- No. 112 Squadron RAF, 6 December 1942 - 9 January 1943, equipped with Kittyhawk III
- No. 250 Squadron RAF, 8 December 1942 - 18 December 1942, equipped with Kittyhawk III
- No. 260 Squadron RAF, 10 December 1942 - 18 December 1942, equipped with Kittyhawk IIA
- No. 450 Squadron RAF, 8 December 1942 - 18 December 1942, equipped with Kittyhawk III

== See also ==
- Agedabia Airfield Complex Similar airfield complex, located in Ajdabiya.
