= John Edwin Ashley Williams =

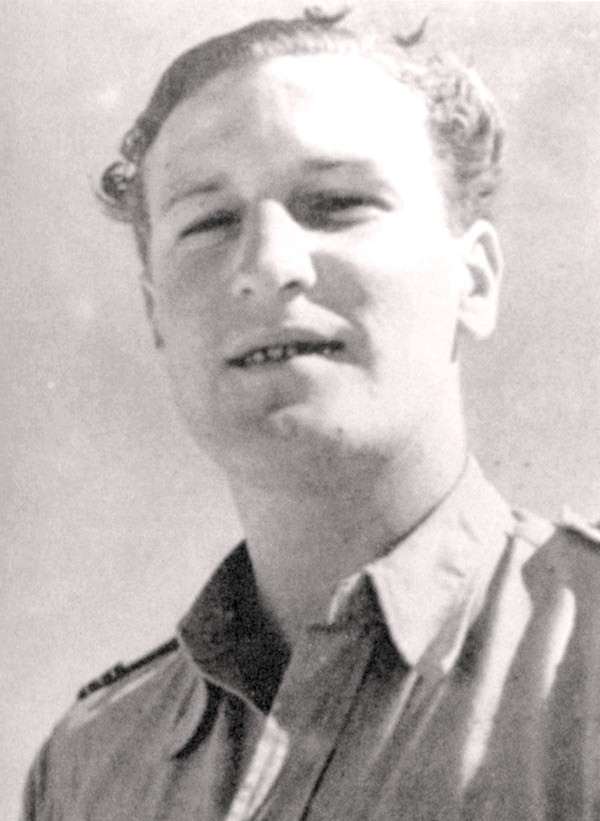
- Flight Lieutenant John Williams, c.1941–42
- Born: 6 May 1919; Wellington, New Zealand
- Died: 29 March 1944 (aged 24) near Sagan, Germany
- Military career
- Allegiance: United Kingdom
- Branch: Royal Air Force
- Service years: 1938–1944
- Rank: Squadron Leader
- Nickname: "Willy"
- Units: No. 112 Squadron RAF; No. 94 Squadron RAF; No. 260 Squadron RAF
- Commands: No. 450 Squadron RAAF
- Conflicts: Second World War; North African Campaign
- Awards: Distinguished Flying Cross; Mentioned in Despatches

Squadron Leader John Edwin Ashley "Willy" Williams DFC (6 May 1919 – 29 March 1944) was an Australian air ace during the Second World War. He served in the Middle East and North Africa with the Royal Air Force (RAF), and was among the Allied prisoners of war (POWs) murdered by the Gestapo following "The Great Escape" in 1944. He commanded No. 450 Squadron of the Royal Australian Air Force for three days, before he was captured in 1942.

== Early years ==
Willams, who was born to Australian parents in Wellington, New Zealand, was from Sydney. According to one source, he grew up in or near the beachside suburb of Manly and was a champion surfer.

Willams travelled to the United Kingdom where he joined the RAF as a pilot officer on a short service commission in 1938.

== Second World War ==
On 14 August 1939, Williams was promoted to acting flight lieutenant, relinquishing the rank on 27 October 1939, and was made a substantive flying officer on 17 August 1940. One year later to the day, he was made a substantive flight lieutenant.

On 11 April 1942, Williams received his first combat posting, when he joined No. 112 Squadron RAF, part of the Desert Air Force (DAF), flying P-40 Kittyhawks. Over the next two months, he also served with No. 94 Squadron RAF and No. 260 Squadron RAF.

Although he remained an RAF officer, Williams was redeployed to No. 450 Squadron RAAF on 14 June 1942.

During June 1942, he destroyed a Junkers Ju 87 and a Messerschmitt Bf 109 near Gambut. On 5 July, Williams shot down a Junkers Ju 88 belonging to I Staffel/Lehrgeschwader 1. Williams scored four victories and two damaged during his time with No. 450 squadron. These kills are believed to have been scored in Kittyhawk AK634 "OK-M".

In late September, Williams was awarded the Distinguished Flying Cross.

During the Second Battle of El Alamein, DAF Kittyhawks played an important role, carrying out many ground attack sorties. During the battle, on 28 October 1942, Williams was promoted to Acting Squadron Leader and was appointed Commanding Officer of No. 450 Squadron. Three days later, while strafing a ground target near Buq Buq, he was shot down. Williams' aircraft was accidentally hit by fire from another member of his squadron. He crash landed and was seen to get out of his Kittyhawk safely. The ground was too rough for aircraft to land and pick Williams up. He later became a POW.

Williams had five official victories in air combat at the time of his capture.

=== Death ===
See Stalag Luft III murders

Memorial to "The Fifty" by Żagań, Williams J.E. middle, lower right

By early 1944, Williams and another 450 Sqn officer, Flight Lieutenant Reginald "Rusty" Kierath, found themselves imprisoned at Stalag Luft III, near Sagan, Germany.

Both men were among the 76 POWs who escaped during the famous "Great Escape" in March 1944. They were both re-captured and on 29 March, along with three other Australian airmen, were among 50 Stalag Luft III POWs murdered by the Gestapo. A posthumous Mention in Despatches was published on 8 June 1944. He is buried in the Poznan Old Garrison Cemetery, which is maintained by the Commonwealth War Graves Commission.

== See also ==
- List of World War II aces from Australia

== Bibliography ==
- Australian War Memorial, 2008, "40652 Squadron Leader John Edwin Ashley Williams, DFC"
- Brodie, Ian. 2006, "Squadron Leader John Edwin Ashley Williams". New Zealand Fighter Pilots Museum.
- Brown, Russell. Desert Warriors: Australian P-40 Pilots at War in the Middle East and North Africa, 1941–1943. Maryborough, Queensland, Australia: Banner Books, 2000. ISBN 1-875593-22-5.
- Herington, John. Second World War Volume III: Air War Against Germany and Italy, 1939–1943 (1st edition). Canberra: Australian War Memorial, 1954.
- Sly, Edward "Ted". The Luck of the Draw: Spitfires, Kittyhawks & RAAF. Ballina NSW, Australia: Spitfire Books, 2003. ISBN 0-646-46314-4.
- Thomas, Andrew. Tomahawk and Kittyhawk Aces of the RAF and Commonwealth. Oxford, UK: Osprey Publications, 2005. ISBN 978-1-84176-083-4.
