= Russell Brown (author) =

Australian author and former school teacher

Russell Brown is an Australian author and former school teacher. He is the author of Desert Warriors: Australian P-40 Pilots at War in the Middle East and North Africa, 1941–1943, dealing primarily with No. 3 Squadron RAAF and No. 450 Squadron RAAF.
