= Martuba Airfield Complex =

Abandoned World War II airfield complex in Martuba, Libya

Martuba Airfield Complex
- Martuba, Northern Cyrenaica in Libya
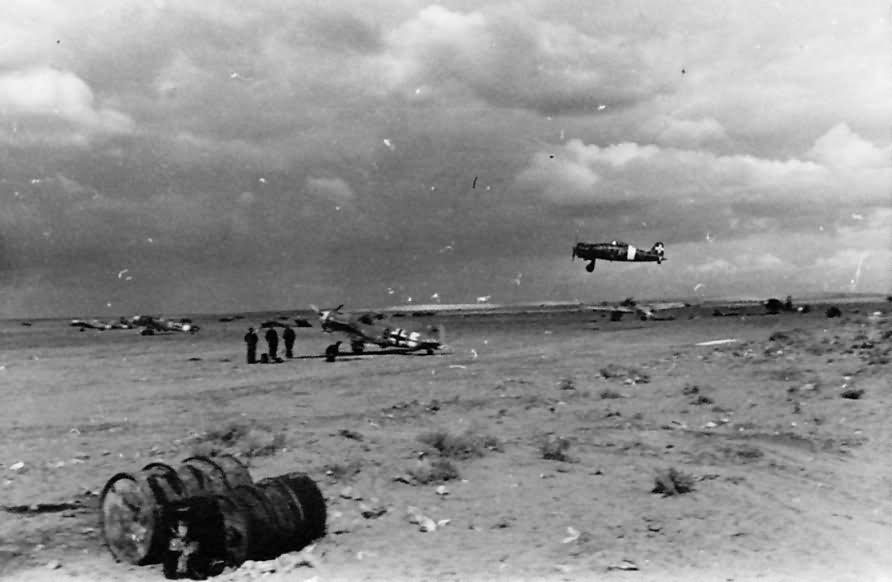
- Messerschmitt Bf 109 of the F 5/JG 27 and Macchi C.200 in Martuba Airfield during 1942.

Site information
- Type: Military airfield complex
- Operator: Luftwaffe; Regia Aeronautica; Royal Air Force
- Condition: Abandoned

Location
- Shown within Libya Martuba Airfield Complex (Mediterranean)
- Coordinates: 32°31′30″N 22°42′40″E

Site history
- Built: 1941-42
- In use: 1941-42

Martuba Airfield Complex, also known as Martübah, is an abandoned airfield complex primarily used during World War II. It is located in Martuba in Northern Cyrenaica, located 23 kilometres (14 mi) SE from Derna, Libya.

== History ==
Martuba Airfield Complex was mainly developed between 1941-42, and served as an strategically important and significant base for German and Italian units. Due to this, it was heavily bombed and targeted by Allied forces. It was considered primitive as it was not as developed as other airfields in North Africa, due to the lack of materials and shortage of pre-fabricated huts and accommodations, which were on the lower priority. In December 1941, advancing British forces overran the airfield complex and found 37 wrecked and abandoned Axis aircraft, about half German. On 14 November 1942, Martuba Airfield Complex was evacuated and abandoned by the Germans. 2 Bf 109 F-4s of I./Schl.G. 2 and 6 Bf 109 E-7s from II./Schl.G. 2 were destroyed by the Germans to prevent capture by the Allies. On 17 November 1942, the Eighth Army advanced westward and captured Martuba Airfield Complex. This allowed the Royal Air Force to command the Narrows between Sicily and Tunisia where British vessels were originally liable to Axis bombing. Following capture, the complex was occupied by Allied units. When the war ended, the airfield complex was likely vacated or abandoned as war efforts shifted.

=== Martuba Main (No. 1) ===
Location: 32°31′30″N 22°42′40″E

Martuba Main operated as the main landing ground of the complex, constructed during the early stages of the war. It was capable to operate all types of aircraft during the war in North Africa. There were several ammunition and fuel dumps set up, and an underground operations and control bunker, accompanied by a few sheds. It operated a single natural surface stone runway measuring 840 by 825 meters. In May 1942, there were 11 aircraft blast bays dispersed around the North boundary and ample aircraft parking along the perimeter. Personnel who were stationed stayed in accommodations consisting of 3 buildings beside a hospital in the Martuba village.

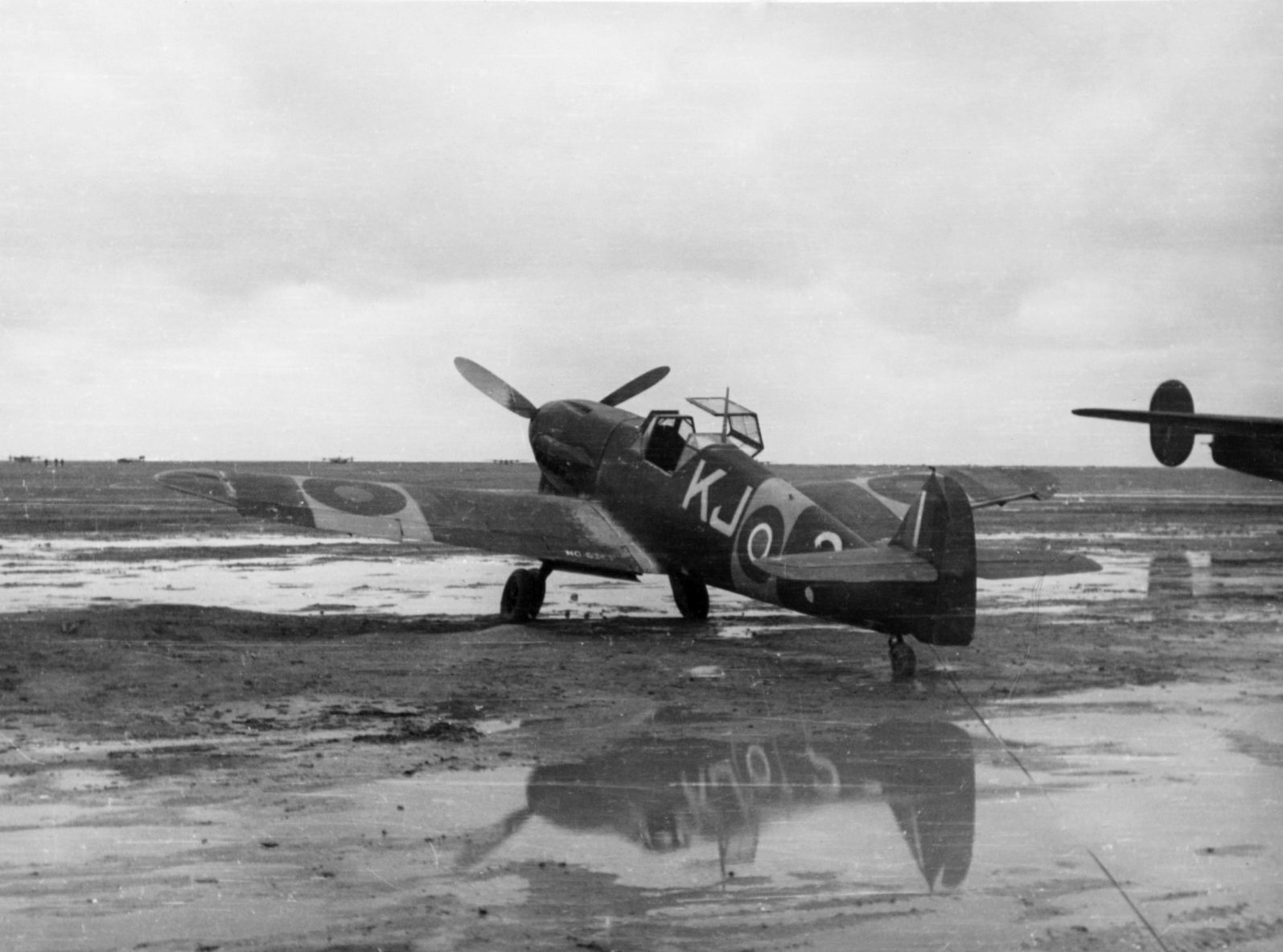
Captured Messerschmitt Bf 109F, given South African Air Force markings and serial 'KJ-?', on the airfield at Martuba No.4 Landing Ground in North Africa, January 1943.

=== Martuba East (No. 2) ===
Location: 32°28′45″N 22°48′00″E

Martuba East was the original and only landing ground within the complex in Martuba before the construction of other airfields. In March 1940, it served as an important Italian airfield and had multiple staging camps for newly arrived Italian soldiers.

It operated a smooth, natural runway measuring approximately 915 by 870 meters. In May 1942, it consisted of 7 aircraft blast bays dispersed in the North boundary and Southeast corner of the airfield.

=== Martuba West Satellite (No. 3) ===
Location: 32°32′00″N 22°40′30″E

Martuba West Satellite was built between 1941-42 located 10 km SW of Martuba village, and 3.25 km W of Martuba Main. It operated a natural surface runway in good condition measuring approximately 1550 x 915 meters. In May 1942, it had an ample space around the perimeter for parking aircraft, and there was only 1 aircraft blast bay.

=== Martuba East Satellite (No. 4) ===
Location: 32°31′30″N 22°44′30″E

Martuba East Satellite was built between 1941-42 located 6.5 km SSW of Martuba village, and 3.25 km E of Martuba Main. At one time, it had a barracks and storage facilities, however it was removed. It operated a natural desert surface runway measuring approximately 1235 by 870 meters. In May 1942, it had 13 aircraft blast shelters dispersed on the Northwest, Southwest, and Eastern sides of the airfield.

=== Martuba No. 5 ===
Location: 32°32′16″N 22°33′40″E

Martuba No. 5 was built between 1941-42 located 19.5 km WSW of Martuba village, and 14.5 km W of Martuba Main. It was primarily used by fighter aircraft. It operated a sand-packed stone natural surface runway measuring approximately 1190 x 1100 x 365 meters with a dog-leg shape.

== Units ==
The following units based at Martuba Airfield Complex:

Italian

- 29º Gruppo BT – Sep–Dec 1940
- 6º Gruppo CT – Nov 1941
- 9º Gruppo CT – Nov 1941
- 17º Gruppo CT – Nov 1941
- 43º Gruppo BT – Nov–Dec 1941
- 209ª Squadriglia BaT – Dec 1941
- 6º Gruppo CT – Mar 1942
- 17º Gruppo CT – Mar–Jun 1942
- 150º Gruppo CT – Feb–May 1942
- 209ª Squadriglia BaT – Feb 1942
- 3º Gruppo CT – May–Jun 1942
- 8º Gruppo CT – May–Jun 1942
- 9º Gruppo CT – May 1942
- 10º Gruppo CT – May 1942
- 13º Gruppo CT – May 1942
- 54º Gruppo BT – c. Jan 1941
- 10º Gruppo CT – Nov 1942
- 9º Gruppo CT – Nov 1942
- 158º Gruppo Assalto – Nov 1942
- 159º Gruppo Assalto – Nov 1942

German

- 2.(H)/Aufkl.Gr. 14 (2nd Army Cooperation Squadron of Reconnaissance Group 14) – Apr–Jun 1941
- II./St.G. 2 (2nd Group of Dive Bomber Wing 2) – Apr–Jun 1941
- 2.(H)/Aufkl.Gr. 14 – Aug 1941
- 2.(H)/Aufkl.Gr. 14 – Nov 1941
- Stab/JG 27 (Headquarters Unit of Fighter Wing 27) – Dec 1941
- I./JG 27 (1st Group of Fighter Wing 27) – Dec 1941
- III./JG 27 (3rd Group of Fighter Wing 27) – Dec 1941
- Stab u. Stabsstaffel/St.G. 3 (Headquarters and Headquarters Squadron of Dive Bomber Wing 3) – Dec 1941
- 2.(H)/Aufkl.Gr. 14 – Feb–Apr 1942
- I./JG 27 (1st Group of Fighter Wing 27) – Feb–May 1942
- II./JG 27 (2nd Group of Fighter Wing 27) – Feb–May 1942
- 1. Wüstennotstaffel (1st Desert Emergency Squadron) – c. Feb–Jun 1942
- Gefechtsverband Woldenga (Combat Formation Woldenga) – Feb–May 1942
- I./St.G. 3 (1st Group of Dive Bomber Wing 3) – Feb–Apr 1942
- III./JG 27 (3rd Group of Fighter Wing 27) – Feb–Jun 1942
- II./St.G. 3 (2nd Group of Dive Bomber Wing 3) – Mar 1942
- 4.(H)/Aufkl.Gr. 12 – Apr–Jun 1942
- 10.(Jabo)/JG 27 (10th Fighter-Bomber Squadron of Fighter Wing 27) – May–Jun 1942
- III./JG 53 (3rd Group of Fighter Wing 53) – May–Jun 1942
- 10.(Jabo)/JG 53 (10th Fighter-Bomber Squadron of Fighter Wing 53) – Jun 1942
- Stab/JG 77 (Headquarters Unit of Fighter Wing 77) – Nov 1942
- I./JG 77 (1st Group of Fighter Wing 77) – Nov 1942
- III./JG 77 (3rd Group of Fighter Wing 7) – Nov 1942

Station Commands

- Befehfskommandantur B Martuba – Apr 1941 – L
- Fl.H.Kdtr. E 20/VI – Feb–Jun 1942
- Fl.H.Kdtr. E 1/III – Mar 1942

Station Units

- 1. Flugh.Betr.Kp. St.G. 2 – May 1941
- Feldwerft-Abt. d.Lw. Tropen I – Feb–Mar 1942
- le.Flak-Abt. 841 (part of) – Mar 1942
- Sanitätsbereitschaft (mot) d.Lw. 3/XVII (trop) – Mar 1942

British

- No. 208 Squadron RAF detachment, 19 December 1941 - 3 February 1942, equipped with Hurricane I
- No. 260 Squadron RAF, 22 January 1942 - 23 January 1942, equipped with Hurricane I
- No. 112 Squadron RAF, 19 November 1942 - 29 November 1942, equipped with Kittyhawk III
- No. 250 Squadron RAF, 19 November 1942 - 8 December 1942, equipped with Kittyhawk III at Martuba No. 4
- No. 260 Squadron RAF, 19 November 1942 - 10 December 1942, equipped with Kittyhawk IIA at Martuba No. 4
- No. 450 Squadron RAF, 19 November 1942 - 8 December 1942, equipped with Kittyhawk III at Martuba No. 4
- No. 213 Squadron RAF, 25 November 1942 - 23 January 1943, equipped with Hurricane IIC
- No. 274 Squadron RAF, 27 November 1942 - 21 December 1942, equipped with Hurricane IIC at Martuba No. 1
- No. 238 Squadron RAF, 28 November 1942 - 13 January 1943, equipped with Hurricane IIC
- No. 94 Squadron RAF, 14 January 1943 - 1 April 1943, equipped with Spitfire VC

== Raids ==
The following lists the Allied raids that were launched against Martuba Airfield Complex:

- On 8 January 1941, 2 RAF Hawker Hurricanes launched a low-level attack, destroying 2 S.M.81 transports.
- On 16 June 1941, a bombing severely damaged 1 Ca.133 and 1 G.50bis fighter on the ground.
- On 11 September 1941, a bombing launched at night destroyed 1 G.50 fighter, and left 5 S.M.79 bombers damaged on the ground.
- On 7 November 1941, a night bombing was launched, destroying 1 S.M.79 on the ground.
- On 17 November 1941, a low-level attack was launched by 15 Hurricanes and 2 Bristol Blenheims. This left 1 Hs 126 destroyed and another damaged.
- On 21 November 1941, RAF Bristol Beaufighters launched a low-level attack, claiming 3 Ju 87s, 1 Ju 88s, and 1 Hs 126 destroyed. However, German sources claim that 1 He 111 and 1 Hs 126 was destroyed, both belonging to the Kurierstaffel Afrika, and 1 Hs 126 from 2.(H)/Aufkl.Gr. 14 left severely damaged.
- On 30 November 1941, the complex was strafed by 4 RAF Beaufighters, claiming 8 aircraft left damaged. However, Italian records show that 6 S.M.79s were damaged during this raid.
- On 9 December 1941, a bombing left 4 G.50bis fighters destroyed and 2 others damaged on the ground.
- On 10 December 1941, SAAF Martin Marylands bombed the complex, leaving 4 G.40bis fighters destroyed and 6 others damaged on the ground.
- On 13 December 1941, the complex was strafed, leaving 5 C.202 fighters damaged on the ground.
- On 10 February 1942, the complex was bombed, leaving 1 Bf 109 F-4 from III./JG 27 damaged on the ground.
- On 24 February 1942, the complex was sabotaged, leaving 2 Bf 109 R-4 from the 7./JG 27 damaged on the ground.
- On 14 March 1942, 12 Bostons launched a bombing, destroying a Bf 108 belonging to the III./St.G. 3 while on the ground.
- On 15 March 1942, 50 bombs were dropped onto the landing area and dispersals, destroying a Bf 108 from I./St.G. 3 and 4 Italian C.200 fighters. 3 Ju 87s were also severely damaged.
- On 18-19 March 1942, an attack launched by 14 bombers and 8 fighters claimed several Bf 109s and 1 Br 109 E-7 from 2.(H)/Aufkl.Gr. 14 destroyed on the ground.
- On 20 March 1942, South African Air Force (SAAF) aircraft bombed the complex, destroying 2 Ju 87 R-2z from I./St.G. 3.
- On 23 March 1942, SAAF Douglas Boston IIIs bombed the complex, leaving 1 Bf 109 F-4 from 7./JG 27 damaged on the ground.
