= No. 451 Squadron RAAF =

Royal Australian Air Force squadron

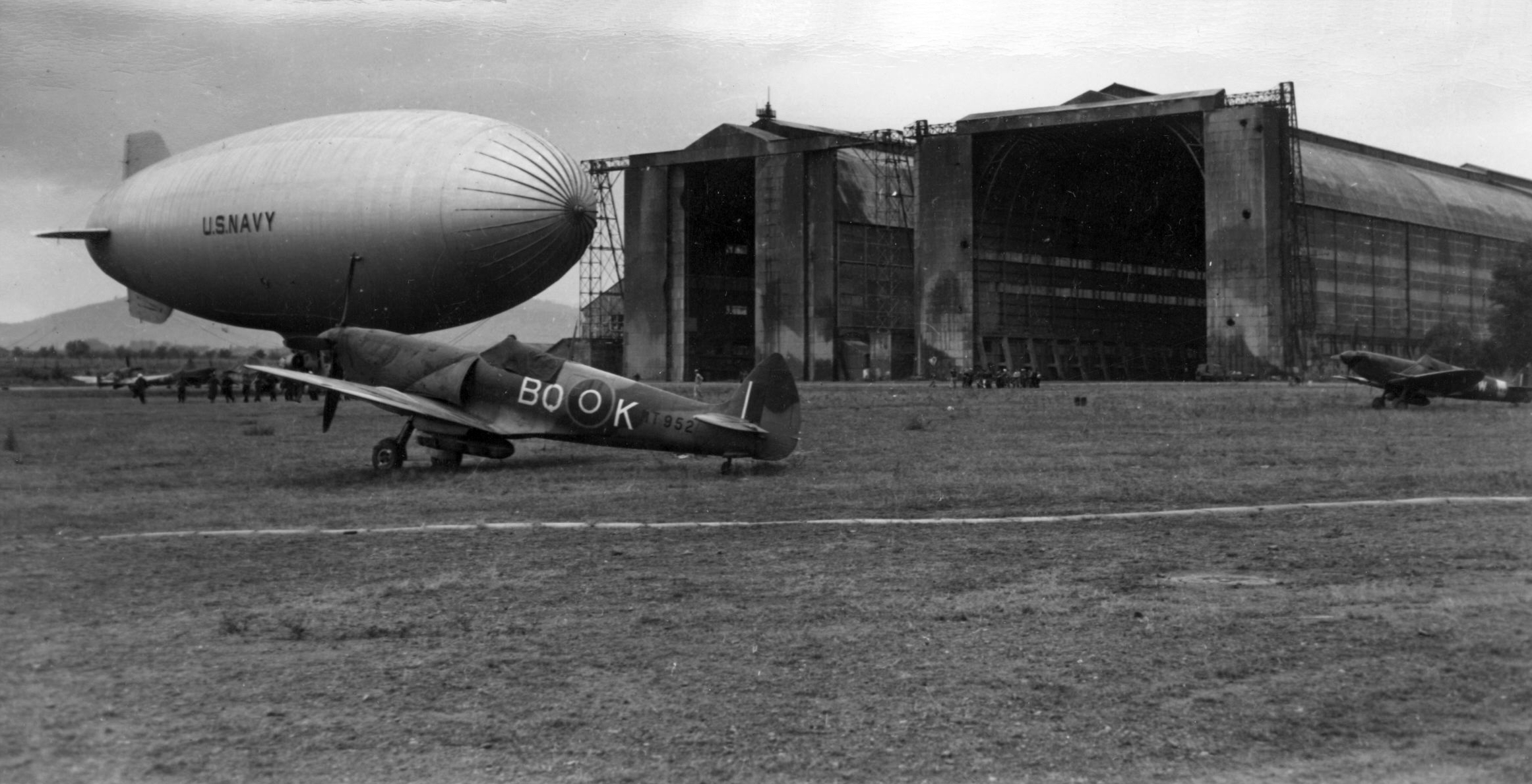
- September 1944. A Spitfire LF. VIII of 451 Squadron RAAF at Cuers-Pierrefeu, France. In the background is a K-class blimp belonging to US Navy squadron ZP-14.
- Active: 1 July 1941 – 21 January 1946
- Country: Australia
- Branch: Royal Australian Air Force
- Motto: Into the midst from above
- Engagements: World War II
- Battle honours: France and Germany, 1944–1945; Rhine; Egypt and Libya, 1940–1943; Mediterranean, 1940–1943; Italy, 1943–1945
- Squadron codes: BQ (July 1941 – October 1944); NI (December 1945 – January 1946)

Aircraft flown
- Fighter: Hawker Hurricane; Supermarine Spitfire
- Transport: Westland Lysander

No. 451 Squadron was a Royal Australian Air Force army cooperation and fighter squadron of World War II. It was formed at Bankstown, New South Wales, on 12 February 1941 and began flying operations on 1 July as part of the North African Campaign in Egypt and Libya. No. 451 Squadron was withdrawn for refitting in early January 1942 and spent the remainder of the year performing garrison duties in Syria. In January 1943, it was transferred to Egypt to contribute to local air defence but saw almost no combat. This inactivity caused morale among the squadron's personnel to greatly deteriorate.

The squadron returned to combat in April 1944 when, operating from bases in Corsica, it took part in the Italian Campaign and Allied invasion of Southern France until September. No. 451 Squadron moved to Italy between September and October 1944, but was transferred to the United Kingdom in November. From January to April 1945, it took part in the liberation of Europe by escorting Allied bomber units and conducting air strikes against German V-2 rocket sites and transportation targets. Following the war, the squadron was deployed to Germany from September 1945 as part of the Allied occupation forces, but was disbanded on 21 January 1946 when the Australian Government dropped plans for a permanent Australian contribution to the occupation of Germany due to a shortage of volunteers for this duty.

== History ==
=== North Africa and Syria ===
No. 451 Squadron was formed as an army cooperation unit at Bankstown, New South Wales on 12 February 1941. As one of Australia's Article XV squadrons it was intended that the squadron would serve overseas as part of the Royal Air Force (RAF). The squadron's personnel departed Sydney on 9 April on board the ocean liner Queen Mary and arrived in Egypt on 5 May. While it had been planned that the squadron would be issued with aircraft from British stocks on its arrival in Egypt, the difficult situation facing Allied forces in the region meant that all available aircraft were needed by the experienced squadrons engaged in combat and none could be spared. It was not until 1 July 1941 that No. 451 Squadron took over No. 6 Squadron RAF's Hawker Hurricane fighters and other equipment at Qasaba. The Australian War Memorial states that the squadron also operated Westland Lysander aircraft.

The squadron began flying operational missions on 1 July 1941. As an army cooperation unit its main duties were photographic and tactical reconnaissance and artillery spotting. From 13 September No. 451 Squadron maintained a detachment of two pilots and two aircraft in the besieged Libyan town of Tobruk to support the Allied garrison; this detachment remained until the siege was lifted in December; during this period several Hurricanes were shot down by Axis fighters. The remainder of No. 451 Squadron was attached to XIII Corps and participated in Operation Crusader during November and December 1941. The squadron frequently operated from airstrips near the front line, and some of its personnel were captured on 26 and 27 November when German forces attacked the airstrip at Sidi Azeiz. All but three of these men were liberated when Bardia fell to the South African 2nd Infantry Division on 2 January 1942. Following the conclusion of Operation Crusader No. 451 Squadron was withdrawn from operations on 24 January 1942 and was refitted at Heliopolis.

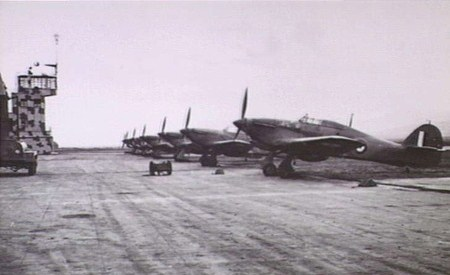
451 Sqn Hurricane fighters at Rayak, Syria during 1942.

In February 1942 No. 451 Squadron was deployed to Syria to operate with the Ninth Army. From March the squadron also maintained a detachment at Cyprus to counter German reconnaissance flights over the island and in June it took over responsibility for providing air defence to Haifa. As there were more Army cooperation units in the Middle East than were required and the Australian Air Board would not agree to convert No. 451 Squadron to a fighter unit, it saw little action during 1942. As a result, the squadron's morale deteriorated and aviation historian Steve Eather has written that "no other RAAF squadron, before or since, has suffered such a widespread loss of morale and combat effectiveness".

No. 451 Squadron was transferred to Mersa Matruh in Egypt on 8 January 1943 and redesignated a fighter squadron. The squadron was responsible for air defence of part of the Nile Delta and nearby convoys and in February it received a detachment of Supermarine Spitfire fighters for high-altitude interceptions. Aircraft from the squadron saw combat on only one occasion during the first six months of 1943 and morale remained low; the RAAF Historical Section has written that this period marked "the nadir of the squadron". In January No. 451 Squadron's commander Wing Commander D.R. Chapman proposed to RAAF Overseas Headquarters that the unit be transferred to Australia but this was rejected. Chapman was replaced early in May after he wrote a letter to the headquarters of No. 219 Group RAF in March which complained about the squadron's lack of employment and appeared to condone the poor morale within the unit. No. 451 Squadron's only offensive action during the year was a raid against Crete on 23 July in which it contributed six Hurricanes to a force of Beaufighter heavy fighters and Baltimore bombers. Three of these Hurricanes were lost during the operation.

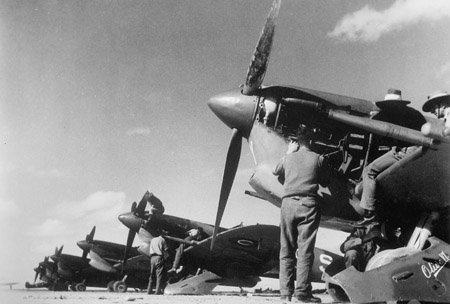
No. 451 Squadron Spitfire fighters being serviced at a North African airfield in early 1944.

=== Europe ===
After being completely re-equipped with Spitfires in early 1944, No. 451 Squadron was transferred to Corsica and arrived there on 18 April, attached to No. 251 Wing RAF (with No. 237 Squadron RAF and No. 238 Squadron RAF). This move was very popular with the squadron's pilots as it gave them an opportunity to participate in offensive action. The squadron's role was to support Allied operations in Italy and southern France by escorting bombers and conducting armed reconnaissance patrols. It flew its first operation from Corsica on 23 April and engaged German fighters on a number of occasions. In mid-June the squadron supported the Free French-led Invasion of Elba. On 12 June eight personnel were killed and all but two of No. 451 Squadron's Spitfires were damaged when 25 German Ju 88 bombers raided the unit's base at Poretta airfield. The squadron's ground crew were able to return ten Spitfires to service by the afternoon of 13 June, however.

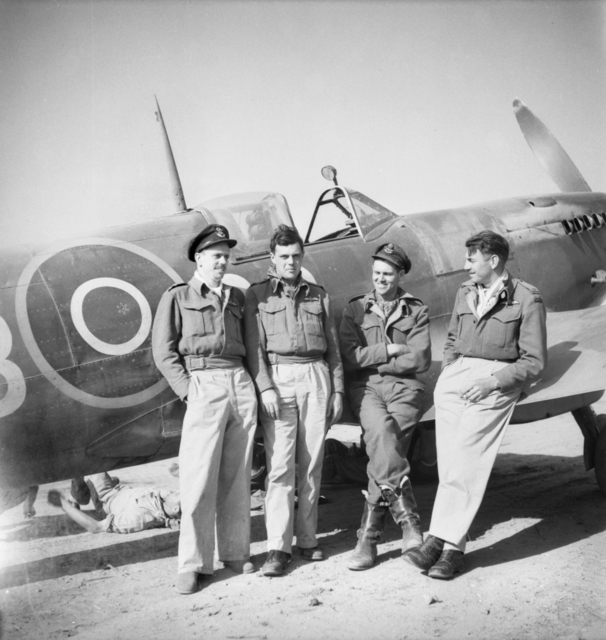
May 1944, Poretta, Corsica. In front of a Spitfire undergoing servicing are pilots (left to right) F/O W. W. Thomas of Malvern, SA; F/O E. C. House DFM DFC of Gnowangerup, WA; S/Ldr E. E. Kirkham of Concord, NSW, and; F/O H. J. Bray of Moolcolah, Qld, not long after claiming four FW190s over Italy.

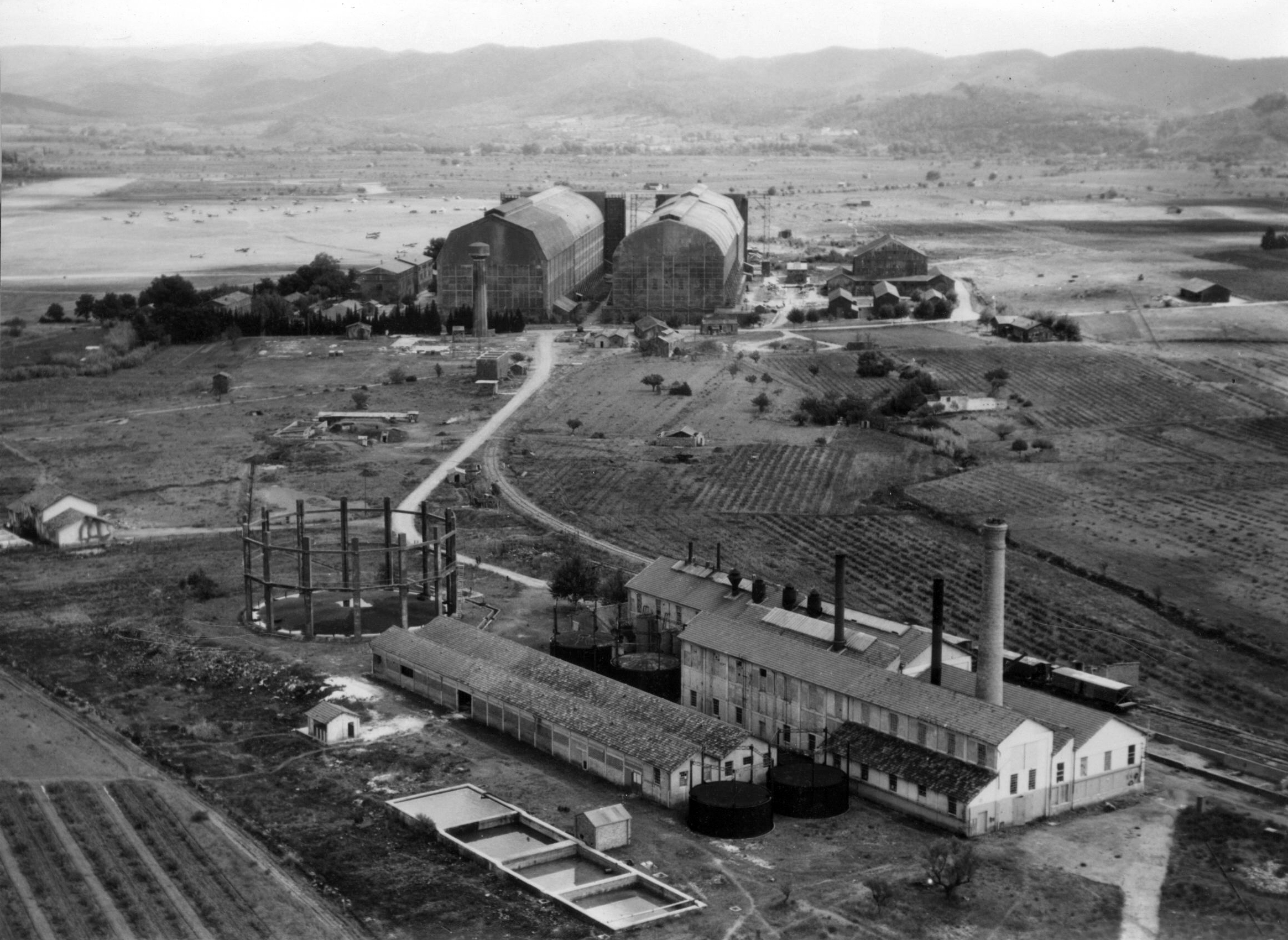
The Cuers-Pierrefeu air base, near Cuers, five kilometres north of Toulon, in September 1944. It was used by 251 Wing, including 451 Sqn as well as the US Navy.

In August the squadron participated in Operation Dragoon, the Allied landings in southern France on 15 August. On 24 August, following the successful landings, 251 Wing began operating from Cuers in southern France. By this time the front line was beyond the range of the squadron's Spitfires, however, and it saw little combat.

From 16 October, No. 451 Squadron was redeployed to Foggia in Italy. By the time the ground crew arrived at Naples on 23 October the headquarters of the Mediterranean Allied Air Forces had decided that there was no need for the squadron in Italy and recommended that it be returned to Australia. By this time it was not practical to deploy the squadron to the Pacific as the RAAF fighter units there were under-employed, and the squadron's training and equipment were not suited to it joining the other RAAF squadrons in Italy with the Desert Air Force. As a result, it was eventually decided to transfer No. 451 Squadron to the United Kingdom, and its personnel embarked at Naples on 17 November after handing its Spitfires over to the other units of 251 Wing.

After arriving in the UK, No. 451 Squadron was issued with Mark XVI Spitfires and based at RAF Hawkinge in Kent from 2 December 1944. It began flying combat operations in early 1945 and was initially used to escort RAF Bomber Command heavy bombers and No. 2 Group RAF medium bombers during daylight raids. From 14 February the squadron was based at RAF Matlaske from where it operated alongside No. 453 Squadron RAAF against V-2 rocket launch sites and railway targets in the Netherlands. From 20 March 1945 the two squadrons were mainly focused on attacking German transportation targets after the V-2 campaign against the UK ended. As the war in Europe draw to a close No. 451 Squadron's activities decreased, and it flew its last attack sorties from the UK on 3 April. The squadron flew only 61 operational sorties for the remainder of April and none in May.

Following the end of the war No. 451 Squadron was deployed to Fassberg and then Wunstorf in Germany as part of the British occupation force. The squadron was deployed to RAF Gatow near Berlin during November and December 1945. While it was intended that No. 451 and No. 453 Squadrons would form a long-term Australian contribution to the occupation of Germany, insufficient RAAF personnel volunteered for this duty to make the deployment viable. As a result, No. 451 Squadron was disbanded at Wunstorf on 21 January 1946. During the war the squadron suffered 28 fatalities, 18 of them Australians.

== Aircraft operated ==
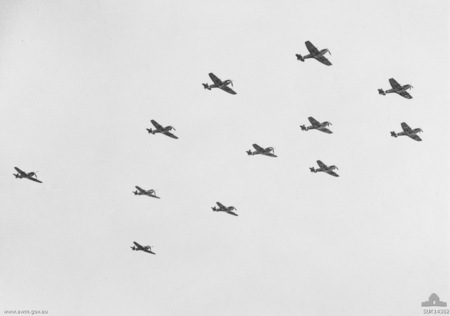
Aircraft of No. 451 Squadron, May 1945.

No. 451 Squadron operated the following aircraft:

From	To	Aircraft	Version
May 1941	January 1943	Hawker Hurricane	Mk.I
January 1943	October 1943	Hawker Hurricane	Mk.IIc
March 1943	March 1944	Supermarine Spitfire	Mk.Vc
June 1943	October 1943	Hawker Typhoon	Mk.Ib
June 1943	October 1943	Fairchild Argus	F24
December 1943	October 1944	Supermarine Spitfire	Mk.IX
August 1944	October 1944	Supermarine Spitfire	Mk.VIII
December 1944	January 1945	Supermarine Spitfire	Mk.IXb
January 1945	June 1945	Supermarine Spitfire	Mk.XVI
August 1945	January 1946	Supermarine Spitfire	F.14

== Squadron bases ==
No. 451 Squadron operated from the following bases and airfields:

From	To	Base	Remark
25 February 1941	8 April 1941	Bankstown, NSW	
8 April 1941	5 May 1941	en route to Middle East	
5 May 1941	12 May 1941	RAF Kasfareet, Egypt	
12 May 1941	1 July 1941	RAF Aboukir, Egypt	
1 July 1941	10 October 1941	Qasaba, Egypt	Dets. at LG.75, Egypt and LG.90, Egypt
10 October 1941	24 November 1941	LG.75, Egypt	Dets. at LG.131, Egypt; LG.132, Egypt and LG.148/Sidi Azeiz Airfield, Egypt
24 November 1941	25 November 1941	LG.132, Egypt	
25 November 1941	29 November 1941	LG.75, Egypt	Det. at LG.128, Egypt
29 November 1941	9 December 1941	LG.128, Egypt	
9 December 1941	18 December 1941	LG145/146/El Gubbi, Libya	
18 December 1941	24 December	LG.131, Egypt	
24 December 1941	27 January 1942	LG.148/Sidi Azeiz Airfield, Egypt	
27 January 1942	16 February 1942	RAF Heliopolis, Egypt	
16 February 1942	15 Augustus 1942	Rayak Airfield, Lebanon	Dets. at RAF Nicosia, Cyprus; Lakatamia Airfield, Cyprus; RAF Gaza, Palestine and RAF El Bassa, Palestine
15 August 1942	18 September 1942	Estabel, Lebanon	Dets. at Lakatamia Airfield, Cyprus; RAF Gaza, Palestine and RAF El Bassa, Palestine
18 September 1942	14 October 1942	RAF El Bassa, Palestine	Dets. at Lakatamia Airfield, Cyprus and RAF Gaza, Palestine
14 October 1942	14 November 1942	Estabel, Lebanon	Dets. at Lakatamia Airfield, Cyprus and RAF Gaza, Palestine
14 November 1942	1 January 1943	RAF St Jean, Palestine	Det. at Lakatamia Airfield, Cyprus
1 January 1943	8 February 1943	LG.08/Mersah Matruh, Egypt	
8 February 1943	27 August 1943	RAF Idku, Egypt	
27 August 1943	4 February 1944	LG.106, Egypt	Dets. at RAF Almaza, Egypt and LG.08/Mersah Matruh, Egypt
4 February 1944	18 April 1944	El Gamil Airfield, Egypt	Det. at RAF Almaza, Egypt
18 April 1944	23 May 1944	Poretta Airfield, Corsica, France	
23 May 1944	8 July 1944	Serragia Airfield, Corsica, France	
8 July 1944	25 August 1944	Calvi-St Catherine Airfield, Corsica, France	
25 August 1944	23 October 1944	Y.13/Cuers-Pierrefeu, France	
23 October 1944	November 1944	Gragnano Airfield, Italy	
November 1944	30 November 1944	en route to the UK	arrival at Liverpool, Merseyside
2 December 1944	11 February 1945	RAF Hawkinge, Kent	
11 February 1945	23 February 1945	RAF Manston, Kent	
23 February 1945	24 February 1945	RAF Matlaske, Norfolk	
24 February 1945	22 March 1945	RAF Swannington, Norfolk	
22 March 1945	6 April 1945	RAF Matlaske, Norfolk	
6 April 1945	3 May 1945	RAF Lympne, Kent	
3 May 1945	17 May 1945	RAF Hawkinge, Kent	
17 May 1945	12 June 1945	RAF Skeabrae, Orkney Islands, Scotland	
12 June 1945	14 September 1945	RAF Lasham, Hampshire	
14 September 1945	27 September 1945	B.152/Fassberg, Germany	
27 September 1945	28 November 1945	B.116/Wunstorf, Germany	
28 November 1945	30 December 1945	RAF Gatow, Germany	
30 December 1945	21 January 1946	B.116/Wunstorf, Germany	

== Commanding officers ==
No. 451 Squadron operated from the following bases and airfields:

From	To	Name
25 February 1941	13 June 1941	Pilot Officer W.L. Langslow (acting)
13 June 1941	24 June 1941	Flight Lieutenant B.R. Pelly (acting)
24 June 1941	16 October 1941	Squadron Leader V.A. Pope, DSO
16 October 1941	25 February 1942	Squadron Leader R.D. Williams, DFC
25 February 1942	23 April 1942	Squadron Leader A.D. Ferguson, DFC
1 July 1942	21 April 1943	Wing Commander D.R. Chapman
21 April 1943	7 September 1943	Squadron Leader J. Paine
7 September 1943	1944	Squadron Leader R.N.B. Stevens, DFC & Bar
1944	7 July 1944	Squadron Leader E.E. Kirkham
7 July 1944	17 July 1944 (KIA)	Squadron Leader W.W.B. Gale
26 July 1944	26 January 1945	Squadron Leader G.W. Small, DFC and Bar
26 January 1945	7 September 1945	Squadron Leader C.W. Robertson, DFC
7 September 1945	21 January 1946	Squadron Leader G. Falconer

== Notes ==
=== Bibliography ===
- Barton, Leonard L. (1996). Bankstown to Berlin with 451 (RAAF) Squadron, 1941–1946. Rydalmere, New South Wales: 451 (R.A.A.F.) Squadron Association. ISBN 0-646-29090-8.
- Bowyer, Michael J.F.; Rawlings, John D.R. (1979). Squadron Codes, 1937–56. Cambridge, UK: Patrick Stephens. ISBN 0-85059-364-6.
- Eather, Steve (1995). Flying Squadrons of the Australian Defence Force. Weston Creek: Aerospace Publications. ISBN 1-875671-15-3.
- Flintham, Vic; Thomas, Andrew (2003). Combat Codes: A Full Explanation and Listing of British, Commonwealth and Allied Air Force Unit Codes Since 1938. Shrewsbury, Shropshire, UK: Airlife Publishing. ISBN 1-84037-281-8.
- Halley, James J. (1988). The Squadrons of the Royal Air Force & Commonwealth, 1918–1988. Tonbridge, Kent, UK: Air-Britain (Historians). ISBN 0-85130-164-9.
- Herington, John (1954). Air War Against Germany and Italy, 1939–1943. Australia in the War of 1939–1945. Series 3 – Air. Vol. III (1st ed.). Canberra: Australian War Memorial. OCLC 3633363.
- Herington, John (1963). Air Power Over Europe, 1944–1945. Australia in the War of 1939–1945. Series 3 – Air. Vol. IV (1st ed.). Canberra: Australian War Memorial. OCLC 3633419.
- Jefford, Wing Commander C.G. (2001). RAF Squadrons: A Comprehensive Record of the Movement and Equipment of All RAF Squadrons and Their Antecedents Since 1912. Shrewsbury, Shropshire, UK: Airlife Publishing. ISBN 1-85310-053-6.
- Milner, Robert; Barrington, Joseph (1998). 451 Squadron RAAF: A Pictorial History; Bankstown to Berlin, 1941–1946. Rydalmere, New South Wales: 451 (R.A.A.F.) Squadron Association. ISBN 0-9586072-0-6.
- Rawlings, John D.R. (1978). Fighter Squadrons of the RAF and Their Aircraft. London: Macdonald and Jane's (Publishers). ISBN 0-354-01028-X.
- RAAF Historical Section (1995). Units of the Royal Australian Air Force: A Concise History Volume 2: Fighter Units. Canberra: Australian Government Publishing Service. ISBN 0-644-42794-9.
