= No. 450 Squadron RAAF =

Royal Australian Air Force fighter squadron

- Official crest of No. 450 Squadron
- Active: 1941–1945
- Country: Australia
- Branch: Royal Australian Air Force
- Role: Fighter, fighter-bomber
- Part of: Desert Air Force
- Nickname: "The Desert Harassers"
- Motto: Harass
- Engagements: World War II
- Battle honours: Syria, 1941; South-East Europe, 1942–1945; Egypt & Libya, 1940–1943; El Alamein; El Hamma; North Africa, 1942–1943; Sicily, 1943; Italy, 1943–1945; Gustav Line; Gothic Line
- Website: The Desert Harassers

Commanders
- Notable commanders: Gordon Steege (1941–1942); John Williams (1942)

Insignia
- Squadron badge heraldry: A jaguar's head couped, pierced by a rapier in hand
- Squadron codes: DJ (December 1941 – April 1942); OK (April 1942 – August 1945)

Aircraft flown
- Fighter: Hawker Hurricane; Curtiss P-40 Kittyhawk; North American P-51 Mustang

No. 450 Squadron was a unit of the Royal Australian Air Force (RAAF) that operated during World War II. Established at RAAF Station Williamtown, New South Wales, in February 1941, it was the first Australian Article XV squadron formed under the Empire Air Training Scheme.

The squadron embarked for the Middle East in April 1941; its personnel initially consisted solely of ground crew, who joined the pilots of No. 260 Squadron RAF to form No. 260/450 Squadron, which briefly operated Hawker Hurricane fighters in Syria. It was not until February 1942 that No. 450 Squadron, now with its own pilots and equipped with Curtiss P-40 Kittyhawk fighters, commenced operations in earnest. Over the next 15 months, it fought in the North African and Tunisian campaigns in both fighter and fighter-bomber roles, claiming 49 German and Italian aircraft destroyed in the air and earning the nickname "The Desert Harassers".

Beginning in July 1943, No. 450 Squadron took part in the Allied invasion of Sicily and the Italian campaign, primarily in the close support role. Its aircraft attacked targets in Yugoslavia as well as in Sicily and Italy. The squadron began converting from Kittyhawks to North American P-51 Mustang fighters in May 1945, but never saw action with its new aircraft. It was disbanded in August 1945 following the conclusion of hostilities, having suffered 63 fatal casualties during the war. Today, by agreement with the RAAF, the squadron's number is carried by a Royal Canadian Air Force unit, 450 Tactical Helicopter Squadron.

== History ==
No. 450 Squadron was formed at RAAF Station Williamtown, near Newcastle, New South Wales, on 7 February 1941. Raised a week before No. 451 Squadron, it was the first Australian squadron established for service with the British military under the Article XV of the Empire Air Training Scheme (EATS). No. 450 Squadron was intended to be an "infiltration" squadron, which would consist initially only of ground crew and would receive a nucleus of experienced pilots after arriving in its designated theatre of operations.

Inaugurated at Ottawa, Canada, in October 1939, EATS was a plan to expand the Royal Air Force's (RAF) capacity to train aircrews by creating a pool of personnel from several Commonwealth countries—Australia, Canada, Britain and New Zealand—through the establishment of a common training system consisting of a series of initial, elementary, and advanced training schools. At the conclusion of advanced training, personnel were posted as required to RAF-controlled squadrons in Britain or the Middle East. These squadrons were designated as either RAF, RAAF, Royal Canadian Air Force or Royal New Zealand Air Force squadrons, but were paid for and administered by the British government, and personnel could be drawn from any Commonwealth nation. Seventeen RAAF squadrons were formed during the war under Article XV of the agreement.

=== Middle East and North Africa ===
Under the temporary command of Flight Lieutenant Bruce Shepherd, No. 450 Squadron left Australia on 11 April 1941, embarking on the troopship Queen Elizabeth at Sydney, and arriving in Egypt on 3 May. At RAF Abu Sueir, Squadron Leader Gordon Steege took command of the squadron before it was combined with the pilots and Hawker Hurricanes of No. 260 Squadron RAF, which had been established without ground crew, to form an operational squadron. The combined unit, known as No. 260/450 (Hurricane) Squadron, then relocated to Amman in Transjordan. Its first operation was on 29 June 1941, when the Hurricanes attacked Vichy French airfields and infrastructure during the invasion of Syria. No. 260/450 Squadron operated for ten days only and flew 61 sorties against airfields, 20 on offensive patrols and six on bomber-escort duties during the Syrian campaign.

In August 1941, No. 450 Squadron personnel were separated from No. 260 Squadron, when the latter received its own ground crew. No. 450 Squadron moved to Rayak airfield, Lebanon, where it was allocated Hurricanes and Miles Magister trainers. A batch of 20 trainee Australian, British and Canadian pilots—the majority being Australian—were posted to the squadron in early October, and it began duties as an operational training unit. A fortnight later these pilots were posted out and, lacking trained pilots, the squadron's aircraft were re-allocated. On 20 October, the squadron moved to Burg El Arab, Egypt, and began operating as an advanced repair, salvage and service unit, taking part in the North African campaign.

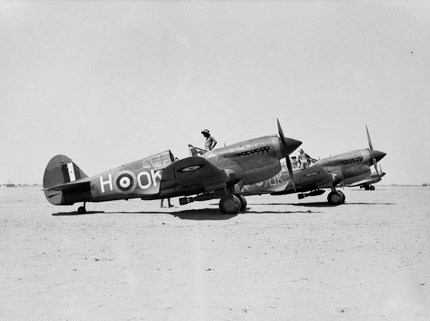
Kittyhawks of No. 450 Squadron in the Western Desert, North Africa, August 1942

By December 1941, the squadron was receiving pilots and it began taking delivery of Curtiss P-40 Kittyhawk fighters. On 19 December, RAF Middle East Command issued an administrative instruction declaring that although manned primarily by Australians, Nos. 450 and 451 Squadrons were "paid by and loaned to the Royal Air Force under the Empire Air Training Scheme and for all practical purposes they should be regarded as R.A.F. squadrons in every way". Confusion reigned for a time, but after intervention by the British Air Ministry, a further communique on 23 January 1942 announced that "450 and 451 E.A.T.S. Squadrons are to be regarded as R.A.A.F. squadrons". Training began the same month, and No. 450 Squadron commenced operations from RAF Gambut on 19 February 1942, with an uneventful patrol near Tobruk. Three days later Sergeant Raymond Shaw became the first pilot from the squadron to claim an aerial victory, after he intercepted a Junkers Ju 88 near Gazala.

The squadron became part of the Desert Air Force's newly formed No. 239 Wing on 1 March 1942, serving alongside one Australian squadron, No. 3, and two RAF squadrons, Nos. 112 and 250 Squadrons. No. 450 Squadron's main roles—escorting daylight raids by Douglas Boston bombers, and ground-attack missions in support of the Eighth Army—were hazardous and resulted in relatively heavy losses. From 26 May, as Rommel launched an assault on the Gazala–Bir Hacheim line, all Kittyhawk units began to focus on the fighter-bomber role rather than air-to-air combat, to support retreating Commonwealth forces. On 29 May, No. 450 Squadron claimed two Junkers Ju 87s and a Messerschmitt Bf 109, for the loss of three pilots killed, including Shaw. Flight Sergeant Don McBurnie, the squadron's highest-scoring pilot with five solo victories and one shared, claimed his final "kill" on 4 July 1942 when he shot a Messerschmitt Bf 110 into the sea following a bombing mission on airfields west of Daba.

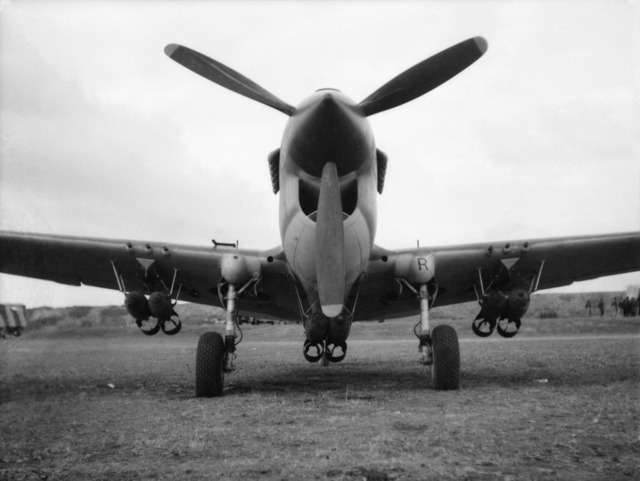
Kittyhawk of No. 450 Squadron, loaded with six 250 lb (110 kg) bombs, in North Africa, c. 1943

No. 450 Squadron took part in the decisive Second Battle of El Alamein, during October and November 1942, attacking enemy airfields and claiming three German and Italian fighters destroyed in the air. It suffered several losses during this time, including one of its leading scorers, Squadron Leader John Williams, who was shot down and taken prisoner on 31 October 1942, three days after he had been appointed commanding officer. The squadron was frequently on the move as the Allies advanced following Second El Alamein, changing locations six times during November. It often found itself using captured or hastily constructed airfields; one Kittyhawk was destroyed and several ground personnel killed or wounded by land mines at Marble Arch, Libya, in December 1942.

From late 1942, No. 450 Squadron was engaged in the Tunisian campaign. By March 1943, as the Allied forces advanced, the squadron was operating from Medinne along the Mareth Line. That month it flew over 300 sorties. Further moves occurred, and by mid-April it was based at Karouan. Throughout April and early May, 350 sorties were flown, including attacks on Axis shipping in Cape Bon and in the Gulf of Tunis. The campaign came to an end in mid-May, but the squadron continued defensive patrols into June. Between February 1942 and May 1943, it claimed 49 German and Italian aircraft destroyed in aerial combat, for the loss of 31 pilots, four to accidents. As a result of its involvement in the North African fighting, the squadron received the nickname, "The Desert Harassers", and adopted the motto, "Harass", both of which were derived from a comment by the Nazi propaganda broadcaster "Lord Haw Haw", who described the unit as "Australian mercenaries whose harassing tactics were easily beaten off by the Luftwaffe."

=== Europe ===
Following the conclusion of the fighting in the desert, No. 450 Squadron was allocated a ground-attack role during the Allied invasion of Sicily. Moving to Malta on 13 July 1943, the squadron staged out of RAF Luqa, and undertook its first attack in Sicily against Carlentini. Four days later, on 17 July, No. 450 Squadron relocated to Pachino, Sicily, from where it continued ground-attack missions. A further move came on 1 August, when Nos. 450 and 3 Squadrons relocated to Agnone, near Catania, where they commenced close air support operations on 11 August, working closely with Allied ground units around Mount Etna. On the night of 11 August, the airfield was attacked by Ju 88 bombers, which dropped incendiary, anti-personnel and high-explosive bombs for more than an hour. No. 450 Squadron's personnel had been located some distance from the airfield and only one Australian was wounded, although casualties among other units amounted to twelve killed and 60 wounded. Eighteen RAAF Kittyhawks were destroyed, including eleven belonging to No. 450 Squadron. Despite this, the two RAAF squadrons flew 22 sorties the following day.

During the early stages of the Allied campaign on the Italian mainland, which commenced in early September 1943, the squadron undertook bomber escort missions in support of the Eighth Army's landings. In the middle of September, it reverted to the close air support role, operating from Grottaglie, although it also undertook anti-shipping operations, including an attack on Manfredonia on 21 September, during which its aircraft sunk two vessels. The following month, No. 450 Squadron was transferred to Foggia, and then to Mileni, where it was briefly withdrawn from operations to convert to newer model Kittyhawk IVs before rejoining the campaign in late November. In December, the squadron moved to Cutella, near Termoli, on the central Adriatic coast of Italy. There it encountered problems with severe winter weather restricting operations. Cutella airfield was located close to the beach; heavy rains caused a storm surge on 1 January 1944 and flooded the airfield, damaging some aircraft.

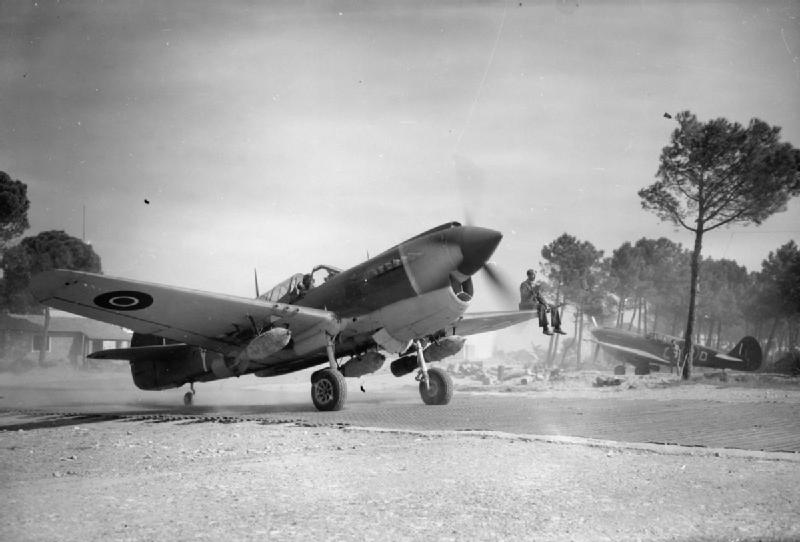
Kittyhawk of No. 450 Squadron at Cervia, Italy, where it operated in early 1945

Meanwhile, Williams and another prisoner of war from No. 450 Squadron, Flight Lieutenant Reginald Kierath, were incarcerated with other Allied POWs at Stalag Luft III, in eastern Germany. In March 1944, both took part in "The Great Escape" and were among 50 POWs murdered by the Gestapo, after being recaptured. Williams, who was 27 years old and from Sydney, was officially an RAF officer, as he had joined the British service under a short service commission in 1938. Kierath, who was 29 and from Narromine, New South Wales, was an RAAF officer.

Throughout January 1944, No. 450 Squadron undertook anti-shipping operations as well as ground support tasks. It flew missions against targets off Dalmatia and in the harbour at Šibenik, as well as around the ports of Velaluka and Zera. In March, the squadron's attention returned to Italy, launching strikes against rolling stock; the following month saw it heavily tasked, flying a total of 430 sorties. On 29 April 1944, a USAAF Republic P-47 Thunderbolt pilot strafed Cutella by mistake. No. 450 Squadron suffered no fatalities or aircraft destroyed but the pilot of a float plane belonging to an air-sea rescue unit was killed, some ground personnel were wounded, a Kittyhawk of No. 3 Squadron was destroyed and several others were damaged. The following month, No. 450 Squadron moved to San Angelo, mounting a series of attacks against a 200-vehicle convoy near Subiaco in concert with other Kittyhawk squadrons that claimed 123 vehicles destroyed or damaged. No. 450 Squadron later operated from several airfields in central and northern Italy, under the "cab rank" system, whereby patrolling fighter-bombers would attack as requested by army air liaison officers. It flew over 1,100 sorties in June and July. The Australian Kittyhawk units were regularly lauded for the accuracy of their assaults; following a mission by No. 450 Squadron on 12 July, the Eighth Army wired No. 239 Wing headquarters: "Excellent bombing. Good show and thank you. No further attacks required."

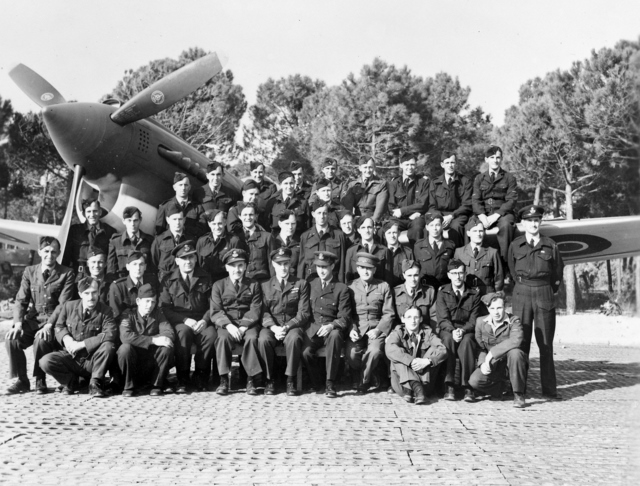
Personnel of No. 450 Squadron, May 1945

No. 450 Squadron took part in the major offensive against the Gothic Line in August–September 1944. Its first attack in early August was a strike on an artillery battery, during which three Kittyhawks were shot down; subsequent attacks throughout the following months were made against rolling stock, armour, and troop concentrations. From November, after it had moved to Fano on the Italian north-east coast, the squadron also began attacking German forces in Yugoslavia. Its average complement of pilots during the second half of 1944 was 25 from the RAAF, seven from the RAF and five from the South African Air Force. No. 450 Squadron commenced operations from Cervia in February 1945; that month, it lost three pilots to prematurely detonating bombs. On 21 March, it took part in Operation Bowler, a major air raid on Venice harbour. The attack resulted in the sinking of a merchant ship, a torpedo boat, and a coastal steamer, as well as the destruction of five warehouses and other harbour infrastructure.

In May 1945, following the end of the war in Europe, No. 450 Squadron transferred to Lavariano, a few miles south of Udine in north-eastern Italy. It also began replacing its Kittyhawks with North American P-51 Mustangs. The squadron was disbanded at Lavariano on 20 August 1945. During the war, it had lost 63 personnel killed in action, of whom 49 were Australian.

== Legacy ==
The squadron was not re-raised by the RAAF after the war, although the numerical designation of "450" was assumed by a Canadian helicopter unit, 450 Tactical Helicopter Squadron, in March 1968. The use of the "450" designation was the result of an administrative error, as the Canadian 400 series squadrons formed during World War II had been numbered between 400 and 449. An agreement was subsequently reached between the RCAF and RAAF and the squadron kept the designation. It is based at Petawawa, in Ontario, and operates Boeing CH-47 Chinook helicopters.

Gordon Steege, No. 450 Squadron RAAF's first commanding officer, became patron of the squadron association in April 2008; he died in September 2013, aged 95.

== Aircraft operated ==
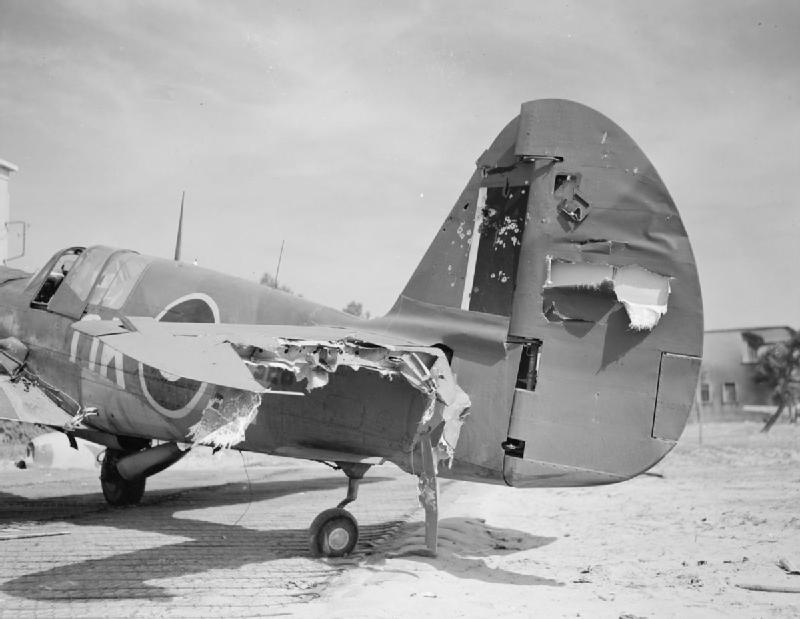
Kittyhawk Mk.IV of No. 450 Squadron at Cervia, Italy, after being hit by anti-aircraft fire in 1945

No. 450 Squadron operated the following aircraft:

From	To	Aircraft	Mark
May 1941	December 1941	Hawker Hurricane	Mk.I
December 1941	September 1942	Curtiss P-40 Kittyhawk	Mk.I
1942	September 1942	Curtiss P-40 Kittyhawk	Mk.Ia
September 1942	October 1943	Curtiss P-40 Kittyhawk	Mk.III
October 1943	August 1945	Curtiss P-40 Kittyhawk	Mk.IV
May 1945	August 1945	North American P-51 Mustang	Mk.III

== Squadron bases ==
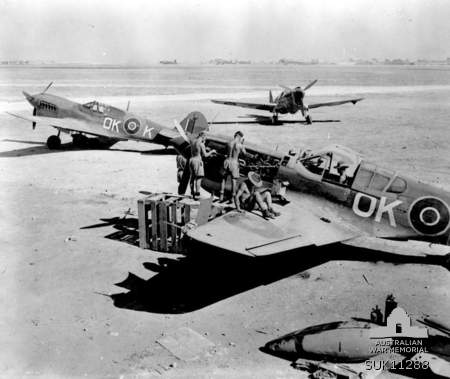
Ground crews of No. 450 Squadron at its base in Malta preparing Kittyhawk fighter-bombers for operations during the invasion of Sicily, 1943

No. 450 Squadron operated from the following bases and airfields:

From	To	Base	Remark
16 February 1941	9 April 1941	RAAF Station Williamtown, New South Wales	
9 April 1941	12 May 1941	en route to Middle East	
12 May 1941	23 June 1941	RAF Abu Sueir, Egypt	
23 June 1941	29 June 1941	RAF Aqir, Palestine	
29 June 1941	11 July 1941	RAF Amman, Jordan	
11 July 1941	18 July 1941	Damascus, Syria	
18 July 1941	4 August 1941	RAF Haifa, Palestine	
4 August 1941	19 August 1941	RAF El Bassa, Palestine	
19 August 1941	25 October 1941	Rayak airfield, Lebanon	
25 October 1941	12 December 1941	RAF Burg El Arab, Egypt	
12 December 1941	30 January 1942	LG.207/LG 'Y' (Qassassin), Egypt	
30 January 1942	16 February 1942	LG.12 (Sidi Haneish North), Egypt	
16 February 1942	22 February 1942	LG.139 (Gambut Main), Libya	Det. at RAF El Adem, Libya
22 February 1942	9 March 1942	LG.142/143 (Gambut Satellite), Libya	
9 March 1942	16 April 1942	LG.139 (Gambut Main), Libya	
16 April 1942	17 June 1942	LG.142/143 (Gambut Satellite), Libya	
17 June 1942	18 June 1942	LG.148/Sidi Azeiz Airfield, Libya	
18 June 1942	24 June 1942	LG.75, Egypt	
24 June 1942	27 June 1942	LG.102, Egypt	
27 June 1942	30 June 1942	LG.106, Egypt	
30 June 1942	2 October 1942	LG.91, Egypt	
2 October 1942	14 October 1942	LG.224/Cairo West, Egypt	
14 October 1942	6 November 1942	LG.175, Egypt	
6 November 1942	9 November 1942	LG.106, Egypt	
9 November 1942	11 November 1942	LG.101, Egypt	
11 November 1942	14 November 1942	LG.76, Egypt	
14 November 1942	15 November 1942	LG.139 (Gambut 1), Libya	
15 November 1942	19 November 1942	Gazala Airfield, Libya	
19 November 1942	8 December 1942	Martuba Airfield, Libya	Det. at Antelat Airfield, Libya
8 December 1942	18 December 1942	Belandah Airfield, Libya	
18 December 1942	1 January 1943	RAF Marble Arch, Libya	
1 January 1943	9 January 1943	Alem el Chel Airfield, Libya	
9 January 1943	18 January 1943	Hamraiet 3 Airfield, Libya	
18 January 1943	24 January 1943	Sedadah Airfield, Libya	
24 January 1943	14 February 1943	RAF Castel Benito, Libya	
14 February 1943	8 March 1943	El Assa Airfield, Libya	Det. at Ben Gardane Airfield, Tunisia
8 March 1943	21 March 1943	Nefatia Airfield, Tunisia	
21 March 1943	6 April 1943	Medenine Airfield, Tunisia	
6 April 1943	14 April 1943	El Hamma Airfield, Tunisia	
14 April 1943	18 April 1943	El Djem Airfield, Tunisia	
18 April 1943	18 May 1943	Alem East Airfield, Tunisia	
18 May 1943	13 July 1943	Zuwara Airfield, Libya	
13 July 1943	18 July 1943	RAF Luqa, Malta	
18 July 1943	2 August 1943	Pachino Airfield, Sicily, Italy	
2 August 1943	16 September 1943	Agnone Airfield, Sicily, Italy	
16 September 1943	23 September 1943	Grottaglie Airfield, Italy	
23 September 1943	3 October 1943	Bari Airfield, Italy	
3 October 1943	27 October 1943	Foggia Main Airfield, Italy	
27 October 1943	28 December 1943	Mileni Airfield, Italy	
28 December 1943	22 May 1944	Cutella Airfield, Italy	
22 May 1944	12 June 1944	San Angelo Airfield, Italy	
12 June 1944	23 June 1944	Guidonia Airfield, Italy	
23 June 1944	9 July 1944	Falerium Airfield, Italy	
9 July 1944	28 August 1944	Creti Airfield, Italy	
28 August 1944	11 September 1944	Iesi Airfield, Italy	
11 September 1944	20 September 1944	Foiano Airfield, Italy	
20 September 1944	17 November 1944	Iesi Airfield, Italy	
17 November 1944	25 February 1945	Fano Airfield, Italy	
25 February 1945	19 May 1945	Cervia Airfield, Italy	
19 May 1945	20 August 1945	Lavariano, Italy	

== Commanding officers ==
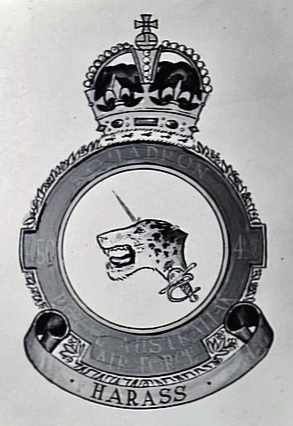
Original crest design by No. 450 Squadron ground gunner, Les Rex, July 1943

No. 450 Squadron was commanded by the following officers:

From	Name
25 March 1941	Flight Lieutenant Bruce McRae Shepherd (temp)
31 May 1941	Squadron Leader Gordon Henry Steege
7 May 1942	Squadron Leader Alan Douglas Ferguson
18 October 1942	Squadron Leader John Edwin Ashley Williams
2 November 1942	Squadron Leader M.H.C. Barber
16 March 1943	Squadron Leader John Phillip Bartle
6 November 1943	Squadron Leader Sydney George Welshman
6 December 1943	Squadron Leader Kenneth Royce Sands
7 April 1944	Squadron Leader Ray Trevor Hudson
15 June 1944	Squadron Leader John Dennis Gleeson
25 October 1944	Squadron Leader Jack Carlisle Doyle

== See also ==
- RAAF units under RAF operational control
