= No. 260 Squadron RAF =

Defunct flying squadron of the Royal Air Force

- Active: August 1918 – 22 February 1919; 22 November 1940 – 19 August 1945
- Country: United Kingdom
- Branch: Royal Air Force
- Mottos: Latin: Celer et fortis ( Swift and Strong)

Insignia
- Squadron Badge: A sword and morning star
- Squadron Codes: HS (April 1941 – August 1945)

No. 260 Squadron RAF was a Royal Air Force squadron formed as a reconnaissance and anti–submarine unit in World War I and a fighter unit in World War II.

== History ==
=== Formation and World War I ===
No. 260 Squadron Royal Air Force was formed in August 1918 as a coastal patrol squadron, equipped with the DH.6s. It carried out anti-submarine patrols from Westward Ho!, Devon for the remainder of the First World War. It disbanded on 22 February 1919.

=== Reformation in World War II ===
The squadron reformed on 22 November 1940 at RAF Castletown, in Caithness in the north of Scotland, receiving Hawker Hurricane I fighters in December that year. The squadron was employed flying convoy patrols off the coast of Scotland from Castletown and RAF Skitten until April 1941, when it moved to RAF Drem to prepare for transfer to the Middle East. On 16 June 1941, twenty No. 260 Squadron Hurricanes took off from the aircraft carrier Ark Royal, with twenty eight more Hurricanes of No. 238 Squadron flew off from Victorious. They then flew to Malta, with 43 of the Hurricanes from the two squadrons safely reaching Malta. The majority of the aircraft flew on to Africa over the next few days. As the squadrons' ground crews had not travelled with the air component, but were being sent by ship via the Cape of Good Hope, the pilots were initially used as a pool of reinforcements for existing squadrons, with 260's pilots initially being attached to No. 80 Squadron based at Haifa, Mandatory Palestine. On 23 June, the pilots from No. 260 Squadron combined with the ground party from the Australian No. 450 Squadron (which had no aircrew) to form a composite unit, 260/450 Squadron, which then supported the invasion of Syria, carrying out ground attack operations against Vichy French forces, and in particular, against Vichy airfields. No. 260/450 Squadron operated for ten days only and flew 61 sorties against airfields, 20 on offensive patrols and six on bomber-escort duties during the Syrian campaign. In August 1941, as No. 260 Squadron's ground component had now arrived in the Middle East, the two squadrons separated, with No. 260 Squadron returning to a full RAF unit.

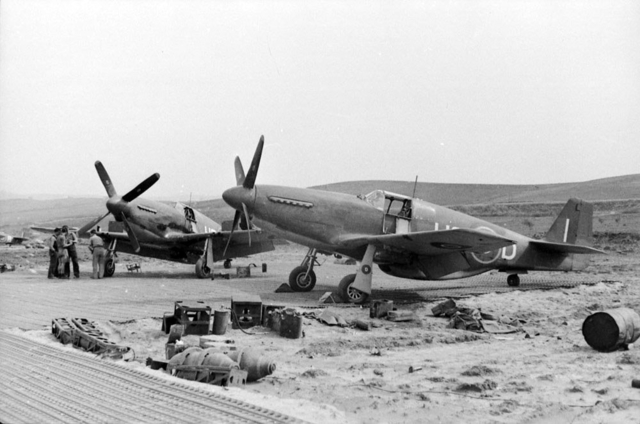
North American Mustang IIIs of No. 260 Squadron at Cutella, in Italy

In October 1941, the squadron moved to the Western Desert, carrying out fighter sweeps, ground attack and bomber escort missions in support of the Operation Crusader offensive, and covering the retreat of British and Allied forces from Rommel's counteroffensive early in 1942. On 15 February 1942 the squadron handed over its Hurricanes to No. 238 Squadron, receiving Curtiss P-40 Tomahawks for training prior to conversion to the more capable Curtiss Kittyhawk I fighter bomber. The squadron then advanced with the Eighth Army into Tunisia. With the North African Campaign over it then moved to Sicily following Operation Husky. As the allied forces advanced into Italy it converted to the North American P-51 Mustang and it disbanded at Lavariano on 19 August 1945.

Among notable squadron personnel were Battle-of-France and Battle-of-Britain ace Kenneth 'Hawkeye' Lee who went on to score a victory over a Macchi 202 on November 10th 1942 whilst a Flight Commander with the Squadron Ken Lee (RAF officer), the future actor Christopher Lee, who served as an intelligence officer. The Australian flying ace John Waddy also flew with the squadron for a time.

== Aircraft operated ==
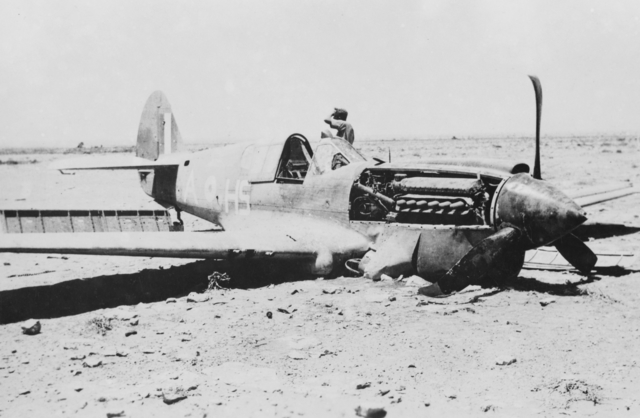
A crashed Kittyhawk I of 260 Squadron, flown by Flt Lt M D Wylie DFC shot down on 30 May 1942 in North Africa, nr El Adem.

Aircraft operated by no. 260 Squadron RAF
From	To	Aircraft	Variant
Aug 1918	Feb 1919	Airco DH.6	
Nov 1940	Feb 1942	Hawker Hurricane	I
Feb 1942	Mar 1942	Curtiss P-40 Tomahawk	II
Feb 1942	Sep 1942	Curtiss P-40 Kittyhawk	I
Jun 1942	May 1943	Curtiss P-40 Kittyhawk	IIA
Dec 1942	Mar 1944	Curtiss P-40 Kittyhawk	III
Apr 1944	Aug 1945	North American P-51 Mustang	III
Jun 1945	Aug 1945	North American P-51 Mustang	IV

=== 2012 aircraft recovery in Egypt ===
In May 2012, CNN reported a Polish oil company worker in Egypt discovered a crash-landed No. 260 Squadron P-40 aircraft presumably piloted by Flight Sergeant Dennis Copping, who went missing on 28 June 1942 and was never heard from again. Copping was part of a two plane formation flying defective aircraft from the landing ground at Biur el Baheira to 53RSU, a Recovery & Service Unit at Wadi Natruna. Copping became disorientated while ferrying the P-40 and flew in the wrong direction; evidence at the crash site indicates Copping survived the landing. Since no remains were evident near the Kittyhawk, it seems likely that Copping wandered off into the desert in a desperate and ultimately futile attempt to reach help. British authorities hoped to bring the remarkably well-preserved plane back to the RAF Museum in London, but these plans fell through. Instead the plane was given a cosmetic restoration and displayed at the El Alamein Military Museum.
