= Gustav Francsi =

German World War II fighter pilot

- Born: 4 November 1914; Gierswalde, present-day part of Uslar, German Empire
- Died: 6 October 1961 (aged 46); Catalonia, Spain
- Military career
- Allegiance: Nazi Germany
- Branch: Luftwaffe
- Service years: ?–1945
- Rank: Leutnant (Second Lieutenant)
- Unit: NJG 100
- Conflicts: World War II
- Awards: Knight's Cross of the Iron Cross

Gustav-Eduard Francsi (4 November 1914 – 6 October 1961) was a German night fighter ace who flew and fought in World War II.

Francsi initially flew as a bomber pilot in the Luftwaffe and transferred to the night fighter force in late 1941. He served in Nachtjagdgeschwader 100 (NJG 100—Night Fighter Wing 100) and was credited with 56 aerial victories, 49 of which on the Eastern Front. (Note: A printing error on page 241 of Foreman's book miscounts Francsi's claim on 8/9 March 1945 as his 55th and 56th victory, when it was actually nos 46 and 47. The miscount inflates this figure on p. 247 as victories 57 and 58 when it was actually 55 and 56. Fransci's last claim on 24/25 April 1945 is counted as his 59th and 60th victories when they were numbers 58 and 59.)

He flew over 250 combat missions and was awarded Knight's Cross of the Iron Cross. Fransci's record is unique in the Luftwaffe, for he was the leading night fighter ace on the Eastern Front. Despite his high total, he remains only thirteenth on the list of the most successful German night fighter aces.

Francsi survived the war but did not re-join the armed forces. On 6 October 1961, he died off the Spanish coast near Sant Feliu de Guíxols in an attempt to rescue his drowning fiancé.

== Early life and career ==
Francsi was born on 4 November 1914 in Gierswalde, present-day part of Uslar, at the time a village in the German Empire during World War I.

== World War II ==
Francsi flew over 100 combat missions as a bomber pilot with 2. Staffel (2nd squadron) of Kampfgeschwader 40 (KG 40—40th Bomber Wing) in the Norwegian Campaign against Narvik and in the Battle of Britain. In late 1941, he transferred to the night fighter force where he spend nearly years instructing and serving in secondary roles. Francsi was posted to the 1. Staffel of Nachtjagdgeschwader 100 (NJG 100—100th Night Fighter Wing) operating on the Eastern Front. Francsi joined the unit in late 1943.

=== Eastern Front ===
NJG 100 was created on 1 August 1943 to meet the threat of Red Air Force nocturnal operations on the Eastern Front. 1 staffel was formed from 12./Nachtjagdgeschwader 5 1 staffel was initially attached to Luftflotte 6 (Air Fleet 6) supporting Army Group Centre. To expand the Geschwader further, 10./NJG 5 was reformed as 2./NJG 100 and attached to Luftflotte 4 (Air Fleet 4) supporting Army Group North. In December another two Staffeln were introduced; 3 and 4 staffel were also attached to Luftflotte 6. They remained on the central sector until 2 staffel moved to support Army Group South in December and was tasked with defending Romania, in particular Bucharest. NJG 100 also operated from Focșani, Buzău, Otopeni, Zilişte until the country was overrun by the Red Army. The smallest operating unit of NJG 100 was a schäwrme (two pairs of two aircraft). This was the result of the far-flung deployment of the Eastern Front night fighter forces. Each schäwrme was a small staffel (squadron) which was about a quarter the size of a standard unit. The lack of numerical strength as offset by the use of the Himmelbett (canopy bed defence system which made the Kammhuber Line), consisting of a rail-portable Freya radar station. Although the German Eastern Front units often lacked airborne radar, they were assisted by a ground radar controller. Fransci and 2 staffel were based at Stalino and Poltava. The gap between the small units were expected to cover was roughly 1,000 kilometres (620 miles) long

Francsi claimed his first aerial victory on the night of 4/5 March 1944. The location was reported simply as "Russia" at 18:14. Francsi recorded the Soviet aircraft as Ilyushin DB-3 medium bomber. A second victory was recorded at 00:07 on 1 April 1944 over a Polikarpov Po-2 (U-2). Francsi achieved his fourth victory the same day, when that evening, the night 1/2 April 1944 he downed two U-2 aircraft at 22:05 and 22:18. He became a night ace on 5 April when he downed a U-2 at 01:54. The next night, that evening, he claimed a U-2 at 21:09 and a Polikarpov R-5 at 21:57. At 21:57, Francsi downed his eighth victory—yet another R-5. On the night of 20/21 April 1944, Fransci experienced his most successful night to date. Between 22:24 and 23:42, he shot down two U-2s and an R-5. Another two victories on 28/29 April at 22:00 and 22:30 were the only claims filed that night. On the evening of the 30 April Francsi claimed another Hat-trick between 21:26 and 22:30. The claims included two U-2s and an R-5. The final Soviet aircraft was his 16th victory.

In May to July 1944 there were many changes in NJG 100. 2. Staffel remained in the south until it was re-designated 4. Staffel and sent north to operate over Latvia, Finland and the Baltic Sea from the main base at Laksberg, Tallinn, Estonia, under the command of Luftflotte 1 (Air Fleet 1) and attached to NJG 201 at Riga. It was then sent back to support Army Group South. It served in night fighter operations over Poland and Hungary and finished the war at Wiener Neustadt under the operational command of III./Nachtjagdgeschwader 6, itself an operational detachment of Nachtjagdgeschwader 101.

From 7 June to 31 August, NJG 100 moved around the Eastern Front and operated from various bases in various sectors. In June 1944 the Red Army began Operation Bagration. The Soviet air forces stepped up their operations at night whilst also landing partisans behind the front using U-2 and R-5 aircraft. Before the offensive began, Fransci intercepted a U-2 and R-5 on the night of the 17/18 June 1944 and claimed them at 22:44 and 23:23. By this date Francsi was operating with 1 staffel. The unit was operated from airfields at Pinsk and Babruysk. At 00:27 on 21 June he shot down an American-built Douglas A-20 Havoc. On the evening of the 25 June he claimed a U-2 at 22:36 and another 30 kilometres northeast of Pinsk, Byelorussian SSR. Francsi claimed another at 01:38, northeast of Pinsk.

NJG 100 is listed on the Luftflotte 6 order of battle for the 26 June 1944. It was assigned to Jagdabschnittführer 6 (Fighter Section Leader 6) at Baranovichi. 4./NJG 100 was based at Pukovichi under the same command. North of Baranovichi on 28 June, he shot down a Consolidated B-24 Liberator at 00:33, followed this up with another B-24 at 00:45. At 00:12 on 29 June Francsi accounted for an Ilyushin Il-4 for his 25th victory. Francsi achieved his 26th victory within twenty-four hours when he accounted for another Douglas A-20 at 23:29. Francsi continued his success in the summer, accounting for another Il-4 at 00:28 on 1 July, three more on 5 July at 23:01, 23:08 and 23:16, one at 00:00 on 8/9 July, one at 23:48 on 14 July.

=== Warsaw airlift ===
As the German front collapsed in the aftermath of Bagration the Polish Home Army began the Warsaw Uprising in the hope of liberating the city. The Royal Air Force (RAF) No. 205 Group RAF, under the command of Air Commodore John Herbert Thomas Simpson, flew supply missions to support the Poles. The British committed the 1568th Polish SD Flight, 148, 178 and No. 624 Squadron RAF to the operation. The South African Air Force No. 2 Wing, lent 31, and 34 Squadron SAAF. NJG 100 performed interceptions of these supply operations. From 13 to 16 August 1944, 17 aircraft were shot down, and 31 were lost overall from British units. German night fighter pilots claimed 11 over Poland and Eastern Europe until the night of the 16/17 August.

Francsi was the only German night fighter pilot to claim a victory on 14/15 August 1944, when he claimed three (misidentified) Avro Lancaster bombers at 00:28, 01:38 and 01:54 over Warsaw. The RAF lost only three this night, all B-24s from No. 178 Squadron RAF. Flight Lieutenant Edwin Charles Thyer, in B-24, RG873 code Q, Lieutenant, Ralph Laurence Lawson, KG828 code F (who had seconded SAAF members aboard), and Flight Sergeant Murray Alexander Baxter EW264, code X.

On the night of the 16/17 August Francsi made four further claims; a Handley-Page Halifax over Opoczno at 23:53, another at Bochina, and a Lancaster at Tarnów at 01:50, and another Lancaster at 02:18 over Przemyśl. Only Oberfeldwebel Helmut Dahms of Francsi's staffel claimed another victory over Poland that night at 02:27 near Kraków in the south. Francsi's success inflated his tally to 39 enemy aircraft destroyed. Among the most notable RAF casualties on the night was Squadron leader, commanding officer, 178 Squadron, J. P. Liversidge RAAF, killed whilst flying B-24 KG933. Three of his crew were taken prisoner of war and two were killed. 31 Squadron SAAF lost five bombers on this night. B-24 Liberators flown by Captain Leonard Charles Allen, Captain Gordon Lawrie, Lieutenant Allen John McInnes, Lieutenant Anthony James Munro (EV941, code Q) and Major Izak Johannes Meyer Odendaal were lost. Odendaal was killed when his Liberator blew up in mid-air. Lawrie was killed when his bomber, EW161, code W, crashed in flames after being shot down by a night fighter. Fransci was awarded the German Cross in Gold (Deutsches Kreuz in Gold) on 10 September for 39 victories. That same month he achieved a solitary victory on 22/23 September 1944—his 40th—an Il-4 at 01:10. The location is unknown.

=== Defence of the Reich ===
By November 1944, I./NJG 100 had moved north to Prowehren near Königsberg, East Prussia. 1. staffel remained near Hohensalza. Francsi was awarded the Knight's Cross of the Iron Cross (Ritterkreuz des Eisernen Kreuzes) on 29 October 1944, having achieved 40 bombers shot down.

Francsi claimed another Il-4 in an unknown location and an unknown time on the night of the 14/15 December 1944. I./NJG 100 were also flying missions on 20/21 December. Fellow night fighter pilot Günther Bertram accounted for three IL-4s to reach his 29th of a total of 35 night victories. Helmut Dahms also claimed his 15th and 16th victories. Leutnant Francsi achieved his 42nd this night over an Il-4, but all the times and locations for the unit are not recorded. On 14/15 January 1945 Francsi claimed his 43rd victory at an unrecorded time and location. A fellow I./NJG 100 pilot, Oberleutnant Klaus Scheer, based nearby, claimed over Olyta, that night to reach 22 victories.

On 15/16 February 1945, an Il-4 was claimed for the 44th victory, another on the night of the 24/25, and another two successes against this aircraft brought his total to 47 aerial victories on the night of the 8/9 March 1945. An Il-4 was once again the aircraft claimed for his 48th and 49th victory on 18/19 March. Two IL-4s on 21/22 March, three on 27/28 March and two on 17/18 April 1945 brought his tally to 56. Francsi claimed a further two IL-4s shot down on 24/25 April 1945 for his 57th and 58th victory but they may not have been confirmed. They were his last successes of the war.

== Summary of career ==
=== Aerial victory claims ===
According to US historian David T. Zabecki, Francsi was credited with 56 aerial victories. Foreman, Parry and Mathews, authors of Luftwaffe Night Fighter Claims 1939 – 1945, researched the German Federal Archives and found records for 58 nocturnal victory claims. Mathews and Foreman also published Luftwaffe Aces — Biographies and Victory Claims, listing Francsi with 60 claims. Two claims dated 11/12 March 1945 are not recorded in Luftwaffe Night Fighter Claims 1939 – 1945.

Chronicle of aerial victories
This and the ! (exclamation mark) indicates aerial victories listed in Luftwaffe Aces — Biographies and Victory Claims but not in Luftwaffe Night Fighter Claims 1939 – 1945. This and the ? (question mark) indicates information discrepancies listed in Luftwaffe Night Fighter Claims 1939 – 1945 but not in Luftwaffe Aces — Biographies and Victory Claims.
| Claim | Date | Time | Type | Location |
– I. Gruppe of Nachtjagdgeschwader 100 –
| 1 | 4 March 1944 | 18:14 | DB-3 | |
| 2 | 1 April 1944 | 00:07 | U-2 | |
| 3 | 1 April 1944 | 22:05 | U-2 | Russia |
| 4 | 1 April 1944 | 22:18 | U-2 | Russia |
| 5 | 5 April 1944 | 01:54 | U-2 | Russia |
| | 6 April 1944 | 21:09 | U-2 | Russia |
| 7 | 5 April 1944 | 21:57 | R-5 | Russia |
| 8 | 14 April 1944 | 21:27 | R-5 | Russia |
| 9 | 20 April 1944 | 22:24 | R-5 | Russia |
| 10 | 20 April 1944 | 23:27 | U-2 | Russia |
| 11 | 20 April 1944 | 23:42 | U-2 | Russia |
| 12 | 28 April 1944 | 22:00 | U-2 | Russia |
| 13 | 28 April 1944 | 22:30 | U-2 | Russia |
| 14 | 30 April 1944 | 21:26 | U-2 | Russia |
| 15 | 30 April 1944 | 21:46 | R-5 | Russia |
| 16 | 30 April 1944 | 22:30 | U-2 | Russia |
| 17 | 17 June 1944 | 22:44 | U-2 | Russia |
| 18 | 17 June 1944 | 23:23 | R-5 | Russia |
| 19 | 21 June 1944 | 00:27 | Boston | Russia |
| 20 | 25 June 1944 | 22:36 | U-2 | Russia |
| 21 | 25 June 1944 | 22:57 | U-2 | 30 km (19 mi) northeast of Pinsk |
| 22 | 26 June 1944 | 01:38 | U-2 | northeast of Pinsk |
| 23 | 28 June 1944 | 00:33 | B-24 | north of Baranavichy |
| 24 | 28 June 1944 | 00:45 | B-24 | north of Baranavichy |
| 25 | 29 June 1944 | 00:12 | Il-4 | Russia |
| 26 | 29 June 1944 | 23:29 | Boston | Russia |
| 27 | 1 July 1944 | 00:28 | Il-4 | Russia |
| 28 | 4 July 1944 | 23:01 | Il-4 | Russia |
| 29 | 4 July 1944 | 23:08 | Il-4 | Russia |
| 30 | 4 July 1944 | 23:16 | Il-4 | Russia |
| 31 | 8 July 1944 | 24:00 | Il-4 | Russia |
| 32 | 14 July 1944 | 23:48 | Il-4 | Russia |
| 33 | 15 August 1944 | 00:28 | Lancaster | Warsaw |
| 34 | 15 August 1944 | 01:38 | Lancaster | Warsaw |
| 35 | 15 August 1944 | 01:54 | Lancaster | Warsaw |
| 36 | 16 August 1944 | 23:54 | Halifax | Opoczno |
| 37 | 17 August 1944 | 01:18 | Halifax | Bochnia |
| 38 | 17 August 1944 | 01:50 | Lancaster | Tarnów |
| 39 | 17 August 1944 | 02:18 | Lancaster | Przemyśl |
| 40 | 23 September 1944 | 01:10 | Il-4 | |
| 41 | 14/15 December 1944 | — | Il-4 | |
| 42 | 20/21 December 1944 | — | Li-2 (PS-84) | |
| 43 | 14/15 January 1945? (Note: According to Luftwaffe Night Fighter Claims 1939 – 1945, this claim is dated 14/15 January 1945 while Luftwaffe Aces — Biographies and Victory Claims states 15/16 January 1945.) | — | Li-2 (PS-84) | Eastern Front |
| 44 | 15/16 February 1945 | — | Il-4 | Eastern Front |
| 45 | 24/25 February 1945? (Note: According to Luftwaffe Night Fighter Claims 1939 – 1945, this claim is dated 24/25 February 1945 while Luftwaffe Aces — Biographies and Victory Claims states 25/26 February 1945.) | — | Il-4 | Eastern Front |
| 46 | 8/9 March 1945 | — | Il-4 | Eastern Front |
| 47 | 8/9 March 1945 | — | Il-4 | Eastern Front |
| 48! | 11/12 March 1945 | — | Il-4 | Eastern Front |
| 49! | 11/12 March 1945 | — | Il-4 | Eastern Front |
| 50 | 18/19 March 1945 | — | Il-4 | Eastern Front |
| 51 | 18/19 March 1945 | — | Il-4 | Eastern Front |
| 52 | 21/22 March 1945 | — | Il-4 | Eastern Front |
| 53 | 21/22 March 1945 | — | Il-4 | Eastern Front |
| 54 | 27/28 March 1945 | — | Il-4 | Eastern Front |
| 55 | 27/28 March 1945 | — | Il-4 | Eastern Front |
| 56 | 27/28 March 1945 | — | Il-4 | Eastern Front |
| 57 | 17/18 April 1945 | — | Il-4 | Eastern Front |
| 58 | 17/18 April 1945 | — | Il-4 | Eastern Front |
| 59 | 24/25 April 1945 | — | Il-4 | Eastern Front |
| 60 | 24/25 April 1945 | — | Il-4 | Eastern Front |

=== Awards ===
- Iron Cross (1939) 2nd and 1st Class
- Honour Goblet of the Luftwaffe (Ehrenpokal der Luftwaffe) (21 June 1941)
- German Cross in Gold on 10 September 1944 as Leutnant in the 1./Nachtjagdgeschwader 100
- Knight's Cross of the Iron Cross on 29 October 1944 as Leutnant and pilot in the I./Nachtjagdgeschwader 100 (Note: According to Scherzer as pilot in the 1./Nachtjagdgeschwader 100.)
