= No. 205 Group RAF =

Former Royal Air Force operations group

No. 205 (Heavy Bomber) Group RAF
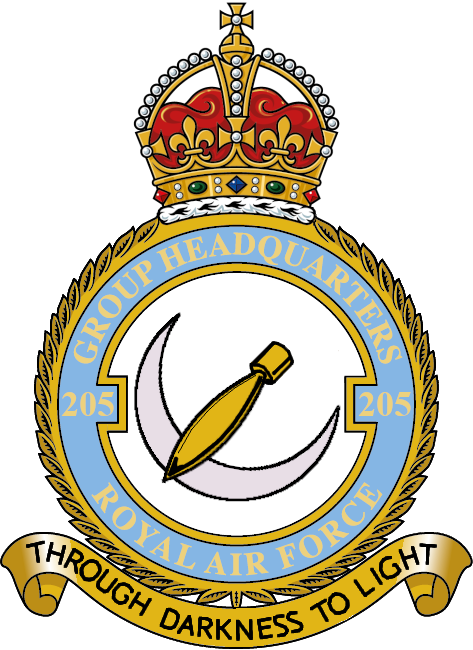
- Group badge
- Active: 23 October 1941 - 15 April 1956
- Country: United Kingdom
- Branch: Royal Air Force
- Type: Royal Air Force group
- Motto: Through darkness to light
- Engagements: Second World War

Insignia
- Group badge heraldry: In front of a Decrescent Argent a Bomb in bend sinister Sable

No. 205 (Heavy Bomber) Group was a long-range, heavy bomber group of the Royal Air Force (RAF) established on 23 October 1941 by boosting No. 257 Wing to Group status.

== Tri-force model ==
During the North Africa Campaign in Egypt and Libya, No. 205 (Heavy Bomber) Group under Air Commodore Alan P. Ritchie was coordinated successfully with No. 201 (Naval Co-operation) Group under Air Vice Marshal Hugh Lloyd, and Air Headquarters (H.Q.) Western Desert under Air Vice Marshal Arthur Coningham.

This model which separated the command into strategic, coastal, and tactical air forces was presented to the Casablanca planners by Tedder who along with primarily Ritchie, Lloyd, and especially Coningham, implemented and developed the tri-force model in Egypt and Libya during 1942. No. 205 Group contributed significantly to these developments.

At the Casablanca Conference in January 1943, British Prime Minister Winston Churchill, American President Franklin D. Roosevelt, and their staffs reorganized the Allied air forces in the North African and Mediterranean Theater of Operations on this model. The result of this reorganization was the Mediterranean Air Command commanded by Air Chief Marshal Sir Arthur Tedder and its major sub-command, the Northwest African Air Forces (NAAF) under Lieutenant General Carl Spaatz, was structured according to the tri-force model.

=== 1944 operations ===
Beginning in April 1944, No. 205 Group began minelaying, code named "gardening" operations, along the Danube as part of the air campaign over Romania's oil exports to Germany. The effects of these operations were considerable in reducing the oil river exports. Until August, 205 Group also conducted around 23 night air raids over cities like as Turnu Severin, Bucharest, and Ploiești.

No. 205 Group units were part of the attempted resupply of the Polish Home Army during the Warsaw Uprising Airlift. Under the command of South African Brigadier Jimmy Durrant, the Group assisted the Polish Special Duties Flight 1586 by providing Halifax and Liberator bombers from the RAF Nos 148 Squadron and 178 Squadrons (334 Wing) and the SAAF 31 and 34 Squadrons (2 Wing). No. 205 Group, including the Polish unit, lost 23 aircraft during the operation.

== Order of battle ==
In the MAC organization following the Casablanca Conference, No. 205 Group was part of the Northwest African Strategic Air Force (NASAF), an Allied command under Major General James H. Doolittle consisting of American (daytime) and British (primarily nighttime) long-range heavy bomber units. NASAF, along with the Northwest African Coastal Air Force (NACAF) and the Northwest African Tactical Air Force (NATAF), formed a complete tri-force under a single unified command (NAAF). The components of No. 205 Group at various times during World War II are illustrated below.

Unfortunately, many of the records of No. 205 Group are apparently unavailable for the period prior to the air force reorganization in February 1943 (Mediterranean Air Command).

No. 205 Group Order of Battle, 1941–1944, data from
11 November 1941 Operation Crusader A/Cdre Lachlan MacLean	Summer 1942 Egyptian Defensive A/Cdre MacLean or Ritchie	27 October 1942 Second Battle of El Alamein A/Cdre A. P. Ritchie	10 July 1943 Operation Husky A/Cdre John Simpson	1944 & 1945 Part of +MASAF A/Cdre John Simpson (until July 1944) Brigadier Jimmy Durrant
No. 37 Squadron, Wellington; No. 38 Squadron, Wellington; No. 70 Squadron, Wellington	No. 37 Squadron, Wellington; No. 70 Squadron, Wellington	No. 231 Wing No. 37 Squadron, Wellington; No. 70 Squadron, Wellington - -	No. 231 Wing No. 37 Squadron, Wellington; No. 40 Squadron, Wellington; No. 70 Squadron, Wellington -	No. 231 Wing No. 37 Squadron, Wellington X to B-24 Liberator VI in October 1944. No. 70 Squadron, Wellington X to B-24 Liberator VI in January 1945.
No. 108 Squadron, Wellington; No. 148 Squadron, Wellington	No. 108 Squadron, Wellington; No. 148 Squadron, Wellington	No. 236 Wing No. 108 Squadron, Wellington; No. 148 Squadron, Wellington - -	No. 236 Wing No. 104 Squadron, Wellington; No. 462 Squadron RAAF, Halifax - -	No. 236 Wing No. 40 Squadron, Wellington X to B-24 Liberator VI in March 1945. No. 104 Squadron, Wellington X to B-24 Liberator VI in February 1945.
		No. 238 Wing No. 40 Squadron, Wellington; No. 104 Squadron, Wellington - -	No. 330 Wing No. 142 Squadron, Wellington; No. 150 Squadron, Wellington - -	No. 240 Wing No. 178 Squadron, B-24 Liberator VI; No. 462 Squadron, Halifax II renamed No. 614 Squadron on 3 March 1944. Used some B-24s after August 1944.
	No. 160 Squadron, Liberator	No. 242 Wing No. 147 Squadron, Liberator; No. 160 Squadron, Liberator -	No. 331 Wing RCAF No. 420 Squadron RCAF, Wellington; No. 424 Squadron RCAF, Wellington; No. 425 Squadron RCAF, Wellington	No. 330 Wing No. 142 Squadron, Wellington X, to UK, Mosquito; No. 150 Squadron, Wellington X, to UK, Lancaster when No. 330 Wing disbanded on 5 October 1944.
		No. 245 Wing No. 14 Squadron (RAF), Marauder, Boston; No. 227 Squadron (RAF) Det., Halifax; No. 462 Squadron RAAF, Halifax		No. 2 Wing SAAF (Joined 205 Group in 6/44) 31 Squadron SAAF, B-24 Liberator VI; 34 Squadron SAAF, B-24 Liberator VI -
		Special Liberator Flight, Liberator		

Notes:

A/Cdre = Air Commodore
RAAF = Royal Australian Air Force
RCAF = Royal Canadian Air Force
SAAF = South African Air Force
MASAF = Mediterranean Allied Strategic Air Force under Major General Nathan Twining was a sub-command of the Mediterranean Allied Air Forces.

It is not absolutely certain which RAF squadrons were operating in 205 Group during the summer of 1942. American heavy bomber units began arriving in the Middle East at this time. The first was Colonel Harry A. Halverson's detachment of B-24 Liberators known as the Halverson Project (HALPRO). On 12 June 1942, thirteen B-24s of the Halverson Detachment bombed the Ploesti oil refineries in Romania. This was the first strategic bombing mission by an American unit in World War II. On 28 June 1942, Major General Lewis H. Brereton arrived from India with the 9th Bombardment Squadron of B-17 Flying Fortresses. The Halverson Detachment and the 9th Bombardment Squadron were both under control of No. 205 (Heavy Bomber) Group for target selection and operations.

Between 26 June and 5 July, nine missions were flown, all but one against Tobruk. The B-17's of the 9th Squadron participated in two attacks, one by night, and the B-24's (Halverson's Detachment), sometimes in company with the RAF's Liberator squadron (No. 160 Squadron), also operated both by day and by night.

RAF operational control of the American heavy bomber units continued even after Halverson's Detachment of B-24s and Brereton's 9th Bombardment Squadron of B-17s were consolidated to form the 1st Provisional Bombardment Group on 20 July 1942 under Halverson's command. When the American 98th Bombardment Group with four squadrons of B-24s began flying combat missions in August 1942, the RAF selected their targets as well. This situation caused some concern among officers of the 9th Air Force's IX Bomber Command and the United States Army Middle East Air Force (USAMEAF).

When MAC was disbanded on 10 December 1943, No. 205 Group was assigned to the Mediterranean Allied Strategic Air Force. No. 205 Group eventually converted to Consolidated B-24 Liberator aircraft, and remained under Simpson's command for the duration of the Second World War.

== Postwar ==
Immediately as the war ended the group headquarters was at Heliopolis, and it appears to have included the Lancasters which at that time formed MEDME's strike force. The squadrons concerned appear to have been Nos 37 and 38 Squadrons, both located at Ein Shemer in Palestine. Both squadrons appear to have been moved to Malta as the final withdrawal from Palestine began after October 1947.

Commanders from 1945 were:

- 30 April 1945 : AVM Andrew McKee
- 1 February 1947 : AVM George Stacey Hodson
- 20 October 1949 : AVM Victor Groom
- 6 February 1952 : No appointment
- 6 July 1952 : AVM Harold Vivian Satterley
- 30 June 1954 : AVM Denis Barnett

The group headquarters was established at RAF Fayid in 1947, and appears to have included Nos 13, 39, and 208 Squadrons, respectively flying Spitfire XVIIIs, photo-reconnaissance Mosquitos, and night-fighter Mosquitos, at that time. No. 78 Wing RAAF (Nos 75 and 76 Squadrons) with de Havilland Vampires operated under the group's control from RAF Hal Far, Malta during the early 1950s.

On 7 June 1952, the AOC 205 Group, Air Vice Marshal David Atcherley disappeared during a flight over the eastern Mediterranean.

No. 205 Group was made responsible for supervising the evacuation programme for the RAF from the Canal Zone from 1953. Air Vice Marshal Barnett moved his rear headquarters over to Cyprus in October 1955, and Abu Sueir was the last station to be handed over to the Egyptians. This was despite the fact that Abu Sueir and Fanara were the two bases to be retained, to be maintained by civilian contractors. Abu Sueir was handed over to Egypt on 14 April 1956, and the group was disbanded at Ismaila (Lee FFME 29) the following day.

== Bibliography ==
- Coles, Harry L. (1945). Participation of the Ninth & Twelfth Air Forces in the Sicilian Campaign, Army Air Forces Historical Study No. 37 (PDF). Maxwell Air Force Base, Alabama: Army Air Forces Historical Office Headquarters.
- Craven, Wesley F. & Cate, James L. (1983) [1949]. The Army Air Forces in World War II. Vol. 2. Chicago, Illinois: Chicago University Press. ISBN 0-912799-03-X.
- Davis, Richard G. (2006). Bombing the European Axis Powers: A historical digest of the combined bomber offensive, 1939–1945. Maxwell Air Force Base, Alabama: Air University Press.
- Howe, George F. (1991). Northwest Africa: Seizing the Initiative in the West. Washington, DC: Center of Military History.
- Kaššák, Peter; Gunby, David (2016). 'Gardening by moonlight'. ISBN 9788097189136.
- Lee, David (1989). Wings in the Sun : A history of the Royal Air Force in the Mediterranean, 1945–1986. London, UK: HMSO. ISBN 978-0-11772-620-8.
- Macdonald, Patrick (1995). Through darkness to light. Upton-upon-Severn: Images. ISBN 9781897817179.
- Richards, D. & Saunders, H. (1953). The Royal Air Force, 1939–1945. Volumes 1 & 2. London, UK: HMSO.
