= RAF Shandur =

Former Royal Air Force station

RAF Shandur
- قاعدة شندور الجوية
- Shandur, Suez Governorate in Egypt
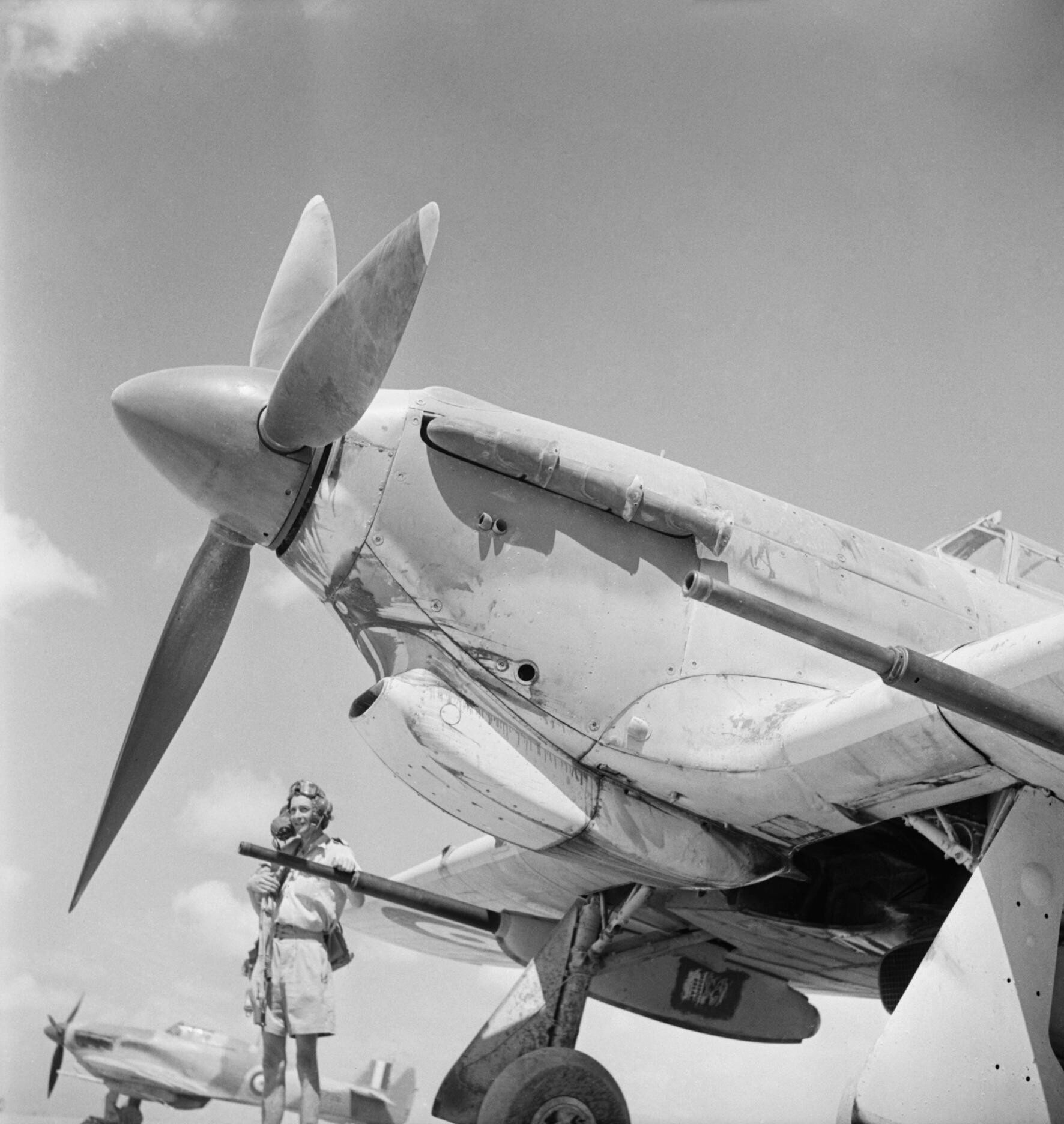
- 6 Sqn RAF Pilot with a Hurricane IID at Shandur c1942

Site information
- Owner: Air Ministry
- Operator: Royal Air Force
- Condition: Demolished into farmland

Location
- Shown within Egypt
- Coordinates: 30°11′17″N 32°32′39″E

Site history
- Built: 1941
- In use: 1941 - 1947
- Fate: Closed

Garrison information
- Garrison: 16th Parachute Brigade, 4th Royal Tank Regiment

Airfield information
Runways
Direction	Length and surface
N/S	1,420 metres (4,659 ft)

Royal Air Force Shandur or more simply RAF Shandur (LG-214) is a former Royal Air Force station located in Shandur, Suez Governorate, Egypt.

== History ==
RAF Shandur was originally known as Station "X", and was renamed to Shandur on 22 January 1940.

From 1941 to 1942, RAF Shandur provided training for RAF crews who operated Martin Marylands. In May 1943, the No. 70 Operating Training Unit was under the control of No. 203 Squadron RAF, and moved to the airfield for training operations until January 1945 when it was disbanded. There was also a Royal Canadian Air Force unit presence here. According to German maps, RAF Shandur may have been mistaken as RAF Shaluffa.

=== Post-war Usage ===
On 25 September, 1945, RAF Shandur was reopened. It was part of AHQ Eastern Mediterranean from September 1945 until 15 August, 1946. On 15 August, 1946, the station HQ was disbanded and closed.

In late 1947, the ex-RAF station began serving as the base for the 4th Royal Tank Regiment equipped with Cromwell, Comet, and Sherman tanks. It was also equipped with American Jeeps and Chevrolet 3-ton vehicles (‘B’ vehicles). In 1951, near the airfield was Camp Shandur, where the 16th Parachute Brigade of the 3rd Battalion was stationed. Shortly afterwards, operations were moved to Moascar Garrison. RAF Shandur experienced extreme weather conditions, such as snow falling in March 1950, and heavy rainfall that led to flooding in the Nissen huts. The 4th RTR remained at the base until 1950, and was the only complete tank regiments trained there, remaining in the area until 1954. Due to the increasing Suez Crisis in 1956, the remaining units were withdrawn from the base. The airfield eventually fell into neglect, having little Egyptian usage.

== Units ==
The following units based at RAF Shandur at one point.

Royal Canadian Air Force

- No. 417 Squadron RCAF, reformed at Shandur on 5 September 1942
- No. 417 Squadron RCAF, 5 September 1942 - 10 October 1942

Royal Air Force

- No. 39 Squadron RAF, 21 March 1941 - 8 May 1941
- No. 223 Squadron RAF, 17 April 1941 - 16 April 1942
- No. 213 (Ceylon) Squadron RAF detachment, July 1941 - December 1941
- No. 223 Squadron RAF, May 1941 - January 1942, equipped with Marylands.
- No. 89 Squadron RAF detachment, December 1941 - January 1943
- No. 6 Squadron RAF detachment, June 1942 - December 1942
- No. 42 Squadron RAF detachment, June 1942 - October 1942
- No. 39 Squadron RAF detachment, August 1942 - October 1942
- No. 6 Squadron RAF, 28 April 1942 - 4 June 1942
- No. 127 Squadron RAF, 14 June 1942 - 27 June 1942
- No. 221 Squadron RAF, 30 June 1942 - 11 August 1942
- No. 73 Squadron RAF, 31 July 1942 - 22 August 1942
- No. 47 Squadron RAF, 8 September 1942 - 29 January 1943
- No. 160 Squadron RAF, 8 November 1942 - 15 January 1943
- No. 147 Squadron RAF, 18 November 1942 - 15 February 1943
- No. 178 Squadron RAF, 15 January 1943 - 4 March 1943
- No. 134 Squadron RAF, 22 January 1943 - 6 February 1943
- No. 237 (Rhodesia) Squadron RAF, 6 February 1943 - 17 February 1943
- No. 108 Squadron RAF, 10 March 1943 - 3 June 1943
- No. 178 Squadron RAF, formed at Shandur on 15 January 1943
- No. 178 Squadron RAF detachment, March 1943 - October 1943
- No. 108 Squadron RAF, reformed at Shandur on 15 March 1943

Units

- Groupe De Chasse No. 1 'Alsace' Free French Air Forces (FFAF) (attached to the RAF), 5 May 1941 and August 1942
- Escadrille Bombardment No. 2 FFAF, 22 May 1941 and 12 June 1941
- Groupe 'Lorraine' FFAF, 23 October 1941 and 12 November 1941
- No. 21 Sector RAF, May 1942 - xxxx
- Special Operations (Liberator) Flight RAF, 3 January 1943 - 22 February 1943
- No. 70 Operational Training Unit RAF, 21 May 1943 - 16 July 1945, equipped with Marauders and later Bristol Blenheims
- Baltimore Photographic Flight RAF, 25 June 1945 - 18 July 1945, equipped with Baltimores
- Shandur Station Flight RAF with a Hawker Hurricane

Non-flying units

- No. 4607 (Works) Flight, January 1943 — March 1943
- No. 21 Sector Operations Room, January 1943 — February 1944
- No 10 Meteorological Forecast Unit

== See also ==
- List of North African airfields during World War II

Nearby stations also in the Suez Governorate:

- RAF Kasfareet
- RAF Shallufa
- RAF Deversoir
