= No. 148 Squadron RAF =

Defunct flying squadron of the Royal Air Force

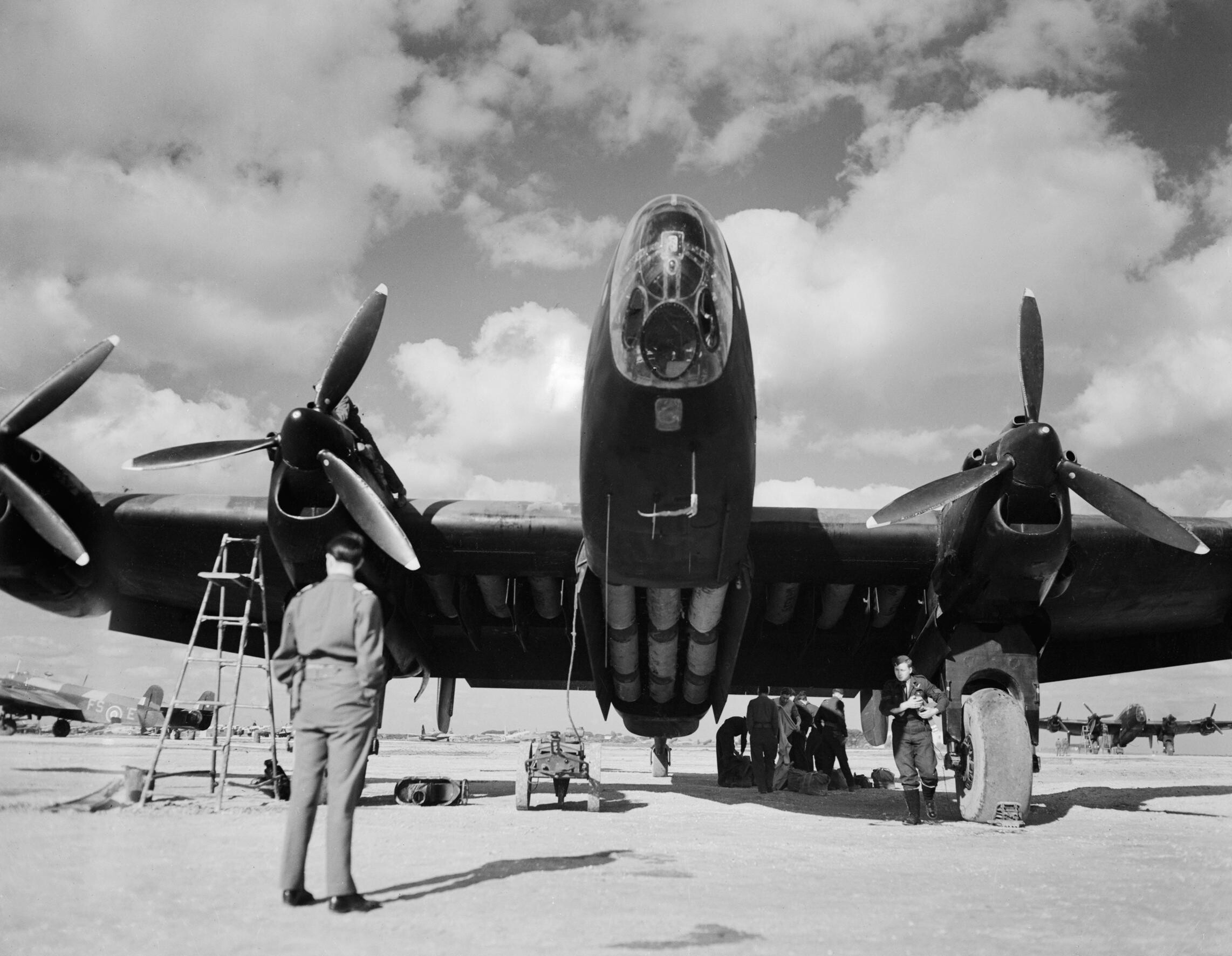
- 148 Squadron Halifax loaded with supplies reading for dropping to Yugoslav Partisans, at Brindisi, Italy
- Active: 1918–19; 1937–1940; 1940; 1940–42; 1943–46; 1946–55; 1956–65
- Country: United Kingdom
- Branch: Royal Air Force
- Motto: Trusty

Insignia
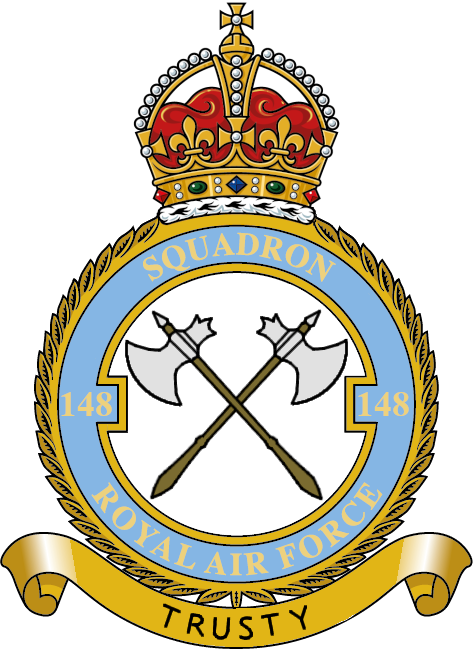
- Squadron badge (Note: Two battle axes in saltire. The battle axes were selected as being well-tried and formidable weapons.)

No. 148 Squadron was a squadron of the Royal Air Force disbanded and re-established several times since the First World War, until its dissolution on 1 May 1965. During the Second World War, the squadron operated as a Special Duties squadron performing partisan supply missions and working closely with the Special Operations Executive for agent drop and pick-up operations.

== History ==
=== First World War ===
The squadron was formed at Andover Aerodrome on 10 February 1918, it moved to Ford Junction Aerodrome on 1 March 1918 where it was equipped with the Royal Aircraft Factory FE.2b and moved to France on 25 April 1918. On 20 May, the squadron carried out a low-altitude bombing raid on the Rumbeke airfield scoring direct hits on hangars. On the night of 4 November, it also bombed the Mons railway station. It returned to the UK on 17 February 1919 and disbanded at RAF Tangmere on 4 July 1919.

=== Second World War ===
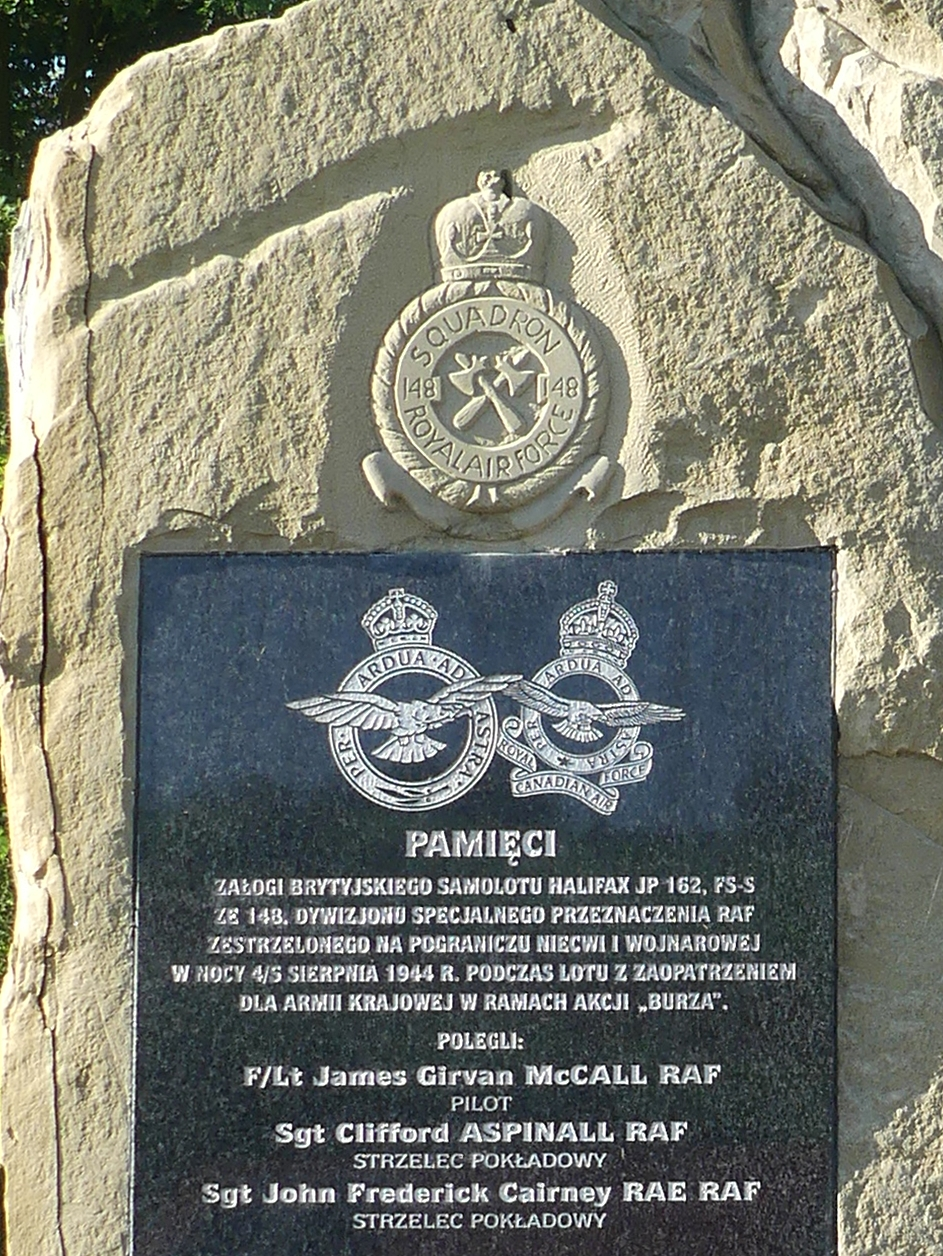
Monument to the Airmen in Poland (Lipnica Wielka), 148 Squadron RAF

It was reformed at RAF Scampton on 7 June 1937 with the Hawker Audax and the Vickers Wellesley and moved twice before being disbanded and merged into No. 15 Operational Training Unit on 8 April 1940. While at RAF Stradishall in 1938, it was converted to a night bomber unit and equipped with the Vickers Wellesley bombers from No. 99 Squadron. In 1939, it received Vickers Wellington bombers and took part in a mass flight of the Bomber Command to Bordeaux and back in July of the same year.

After Italy entered into the war, RAF bomber detachments were sent to Malta to attack targets in North Africa and Italy. In December 1940, No. 148 Squadron was reformed by merging three detachments from the Nos 38, 99, and 115 Squadrons at RAF Luqa. After moving to Egypt, the squadron supported the Eighth Army in the North African campaign. Moved back to Malta in December 1942, the squadron was disbanded with its crews and aircraft being transferred to other units.

With the expansion of the Royal Air Force Special Duties Service, the unit was reformed in 1943 as No. 148 (Special Duties) Squadron equipped with Handley Page Halifax and Consolidated Liberator bombers. As a special duties squadron, the unit's aircraft dropped supplies to partisans in southern France, Italy, the Balkans, and Poland. Working closely with the SOE, the squadron also parachuted agents to various locations in Europe, while its flight of Westland Lysanders under the command of Peter Vaughan-Fowler did agent pick-up operations to Greece, Yugoslavia and southern France. When it was not needed for these kinds of missions, No. 148 took part in regular bombing raids.

After the squadron was moved to Brindisi in 1944, it assisted the No. 1586 (Polish Special Duties) Flight by supplying ammunition, fuel and aircraft, as the No. 138 Squadron could no longer supply the Polish Flight due to distance. The 1586 Special Flight remained with No. 148 until it was reformed as the No. 301 Polish Bomber Squadron in November 1944.

Assigned to 334 Wing of the No. 205 Group together with No. 178 Squadron, the squadron participated in the Warsaw airlift in August 1944 and suffered heavy losses during this mission. The unit continued its work through the end of the war.

=== Cold War ===
The squadron moved to Egypt after the war and was disbanded on 16 January 1946. Reformed in November 1946, it operated Avro Lancasters until January 1950 when the aircraft were replaced by Avro Lincolns. It was disbanded again on 1 July 1955. From 1 July 1956 until 1 May 1965, No. 148 operated the Vickers Valiant nuclear bomber out of RAF Marham, Norfolk. In October 1956, it was detached to Malta and participated in the Suez Crisis.

== Aircraft operated ==
Aircraft operated by No. 148 Squadron
| From | Aircraft | Variant |
|---|---|---|
| 1918 | Royal Aircraft Factory FE.2b | |
| 1937 | Hawker Audax | |
| 1937 | Vickers Wellesley | |
| 1938 | Handley Page Heyford | III |
| Mar 1939 | Vickers Wellington | I |
| Apr 1939 | Avro Anson | I |
| Dec 1940 | Vickers Wellington | IC |
| Sep 1941 | Vickers Wellington | II |
| Mar 1943 | Consolidated Liberator | II |
| Mar 1943 | Handley Page Halifax | II |
| Feb 1944 | Westland Lysander | IIIA |
| Aug 1944 | Handley Page Halifax | V |
| Nov 1944 | Short Stirling | IV |
| Mar 1945 | Consolidated Liberator | VI |
| 1946 | Avro Lancaster | B.1 (FE) |
| 1949 | Avro Lincoln | B.2 |
| 1956 | Vickers Valiant | B1 and B(K).1 |
| 1957 | Vickers Valiant | B(PR).1 |
| 1958 | Vickers Valiant | B(PR)K.1 |

Records from 58RSU indicate 148 Sqdn also operated Bristol Blenheims as 58RSU carried out an engine change on Blenheim Z6157 of 148 Sqdn at Maryut in July 1943, after which it was flown to Heliopolis.

== Squadron bases ==
Bases and airfields used by No. 614 Squadron
| From | To | Name |
|---|---|---|
| 10 March 1938 | 4 September 1939 | RAF Stradishall |
| 4 September 1939 | 4 April 1940 | RAF Harwell |
| 30 April 1940 | 23 June 1940 | RAF Stradishall |
| 14 December 1940 | 9 March 1941 | RAF Luqa |
| 9 March 1941 | 19 April 1942 | RAF Kabrit |
| 19 April 1942 | 26 June 1942 | LG-106 |
| 26 June 1942 | 9 August 1942 | RAF Kabrit |
| 9 August 1942 | 14 November 1942 | LG-237 |
| 14 November 1942 | 1 December 1942 | LG-009 |
| 1 December 1942 | 7 December 1942 | LG-167 |
| 7 December 1942 | 14 December 1942 | RAF Luqa |
| 14 March 1943 | 5 April 1943 | RAF Gambut |
| 5 April 1943 | 2 September 1943 | RAF Derna |
| 2 September 1943 | 31 January 1944 | Tocra |
| 31 January 1944 | 28 June 1945 | Brindisi |
| 1 July 1956 | 1 May 1965 | RAF Marham |
