= Ismailia Air Base =

Egyptian airforce helicopter base

Ismailia Air Base RAF Ismailia RAF Moascar
- Arabic: قاعدة الاسماعيلية الجوية
- Ismailia, Ismailia Governorate in Egypt
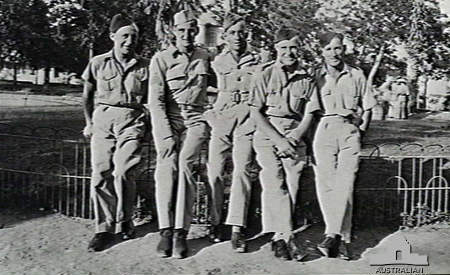
- Members of No. 458 Squadron RAAF at RAF Ismailia, 1942

Site information
- Type: Air Base
- Owner: Ministry of Defense (Egypt)
- Operator: Royal Air Force; United States Army Air Forces; Egyptian Air Force
- Controlled by: Royal Air Force (1935-1956); Ninth Air Force (1942); Egyptian Air Force (1956 – present)

Location
- Shown within Egypt
- Coordinates: 30°35′53.75″N 32°14′12.86″E

Site history
- Built: 1915
- In use: 1915 - present
- Battles/wars: World War II: Western Desert campaign

Airfield information
- Elevation: 11 metres (36 ft) AMSL
Runways
Direction	Length and surface
13/31	980 metres (3,215 ft) Asphalt

Ismailia Air Base El Qūwāt El Gawīyä El Maṣrīyä is an air base of the Egyptian Air Force located approximately 4 kilometres (2.5 mi) west-northwest of the city of Ismailia; 116 kilometres (72 mi) northeast of Cairo, Egypt.

== History ==
Ismailia was a pre-World War II station, originally opened by the British about 1915 as Moascar.

On 5–7 November 1938, RAF Vickers Wellesley aircraft set a non-stop distance record by flying from Ismailia to Darwin, Australia, a distance of 7,162 miles (11520.4 km).

During World War II, the airfield, then known as RAF Ismailia, continued to be used as a military airfield by the British Royal Air Force and also the United States Army Air Forces during the North African campaign against Axis forces.

== History ==
Royal Air Force

- No. 6 Squadron RAF between 28 October 1929 and 29 May 1936 with the Fairey Gordon, Hawker Hart and Hawker Demon
- No. 11 Squadron RAF between 9 May and 16 June 1940 with the Bristol Blenheim I
- No. 14 Squadron RAF initially between 23 November 1915 and 20 January 1917 with the Royal Aircraft Factory B.E.2C & E, Farman MF.11 Shorthorn, Martinsyde S.1, Martinsyde G.100 and Airco DH.1A the between 24 August and 19 December 1940 with the Vickers Wellesley
- No. 30 Squadron RAF between 25 August 1939 and 9 July 1940 with the Blenheim I & IF
- No. 33 Squadron RAF between 14 November 1936 and 21 October 1938 with the Hart and Gloster Gladiator I
- No. 38 Squadron RAF between 24 November and 7 December 1940 with the Vickers Wellington IC
- No. 45 Squadron RAF between 3 January and 4 August 1939 with the Wellesley and Blenheim I
- No. 55 Squadron RAF between 25 August 1939 and 11 June 1940 with the Blenheim I
- No. 64 Squadron RAF between 9 April and 1 August 1936 with the Demon
- No. 80 Squadron RAF between 10 May 1938 and 16 January 1939 with the Gladiator
- No. 94 Squadron RAF between 22 April and 29 August 1941 with the Gladiator II and the Hawker Hurricane I
- No. 113 Squadron RAF between 1 August and 10 October 1917 with the B.E.2E and the Royal Aircraft Factory R.E.8
- No. 142 Squadron RAF initially between 2 February and 13 February 1918 with the Royal Aircraft Factory B.E.12A then between 3 August and 5 November 1936 with the Hart
- No. 208 Squadron RAF initially between 1 February 1920 and 28 September 1922 with R.E.8 and Bristol F.2B Fighter then between 26 September 1923 and 27 October 1927 with the F.2B
- No. 211 Squadron RAF between 31 January and 10 August 1939 and Hawker Hind and Blenheim I
- Detachment from No. 213 Squadron RAF between July and December 1941 with the Hurricane I
- No. 237 (Rhodesia) Squadron RAF between 6 February and 1 March 1942 with the Hurricane I
- Detachment from No. 274 Squadron RAF between February and April 1941 with the Hurricane I
- No. 651 Squadron RAF between 10 November 1945 and 2 February 1946 with the Taylorcraft Auster V

United States Army Air Forces (Ninth Air Force)

- 12th Bombardment Group October 1942-Undetermined (North American B-25 Mitchell)
- 436th Troop Carrier Group, 13 August – 18 October 1942. Douglas C-47 Skytrain
- 434th Bombardment Group, 14 August – 29 September 1942, B-25 Mitchell

In the 1950s it housed 4th Royal Tank Regiment after it had moved from RAF Shandur.

== Current use ==
The base houses a Mil Mi-17 unit and is also being used for other military movements.

== See also ==
- List of North African airfields during World War II
