= Fayid Air Base =

Former military airfield in Egypt

Fayid Air Base RAF Fayid - LG-211
- Arabic: قاعدة فايد الجوية
- Fayed, Ismailia Governorate in Egypt

Site information
- Type: Air Base
- Owner: Ministry of Defense (Egypt)
- Operator: Egyptian Air Force

Location
- Shown within Egypt Fayid Air Base (Africa)
- Coordinates: 30°19′49″N 032°16′11″E

Site history
- Built: 1942 & 1980
- In use: 1942 - present

Airfield information
- Elevation: 21 metres (69 ft) AMSL
Runways
Direction	Length and surface
09/27	3,000 metres (9,843 ft) Asphalt

Fayid Air Base is an Air base of the Egyptian Air Force located west of Fayed, Ismailia Governorate, Egypt and 23 km (14 mi) south of Ismailia (Al Isma`iliyah) and 116 km (72 mi) northeast of Cairo. It was formerly RAF Fayid, a Royal Air Force station operational from 1942.

The base is home to both 86 and 88 Squadrons of 282 Tactical Fighter Wing of 149 Air Division, both squadrons fly the General Dynamics F-16C/D-40 Fighting Falcon.

== History ==
During the Second World War, it was used as a military airfield by the Royal Air Force and the United States Army Air Forces during the North African campaign against Axis forces.

Fayid was also the site of Camp Fayed, a significant internment camp of Italian Egyptians managed by the British authorities.

USAAF Ninth Air Force units which used the airfield were:

- 98th Bombardment Group, 11 November 1942 – 9 February 1943 Consolidated B-24 Liberator
- 316th Troop Carrier Group, January–May 1943. Douglas C-47 Skytrain

After the immediate postwar rundown of RAF units in the Mediterranean, RAF Fayid became the home of No. 13 Squadron RAF flying de Havilland Mosquitoes. Later it was joined by No. 39 Squadron RAF, with night fighter Mosquitos, and No. 208 Squadron RAF with fighter-reconnaissance Supermarine Spitfire XVIIIs. By 1952 it was the main transport staging post in the Canal Zone and also had five Vickers Valetta (MRT) Squadrons inc. 70, 78, 114 and 216. Along with the other RAF stations in Egypt, it was evacuated by April 1956.

The following squadrons were here at some point:

- No. 6 Squadron RAF, No. 13 Squadron RAF, No. 14 Squadron RAF, No. 37 Squadron RAF, No. 38 Squadron RAF, No. 39 Squadron RAF, No. 70 Squadron RAF, No. 76 Squadron RAF, No. 78 Squadron RAF, No. 84 Squadron RAF, No. 92 (East India) Squadron RAF, No. 108 Squadron RAF, No. 112 Squadron RAF, No. 114 (Hong Kong) Squadron RAF, No. 147 Squadron RAF, No. 159 Squadron RAF, No. 160 Squadron RAF, No. 178 Squadron RAF, No. 204 Squadron RAF, No. 208 Squadron RAF, No. 215 Squadron RAF, No. 216 Squadron RAF, No. 454 Squadron RAAF, No. 458 Squadron RAAF, No. 462 Squadron RAAF, No. 651 Squadron RAF, No. 683 Squadron RAF

== October War of 1973 ==
On October 20, 1973, during the Yom Kippur War, a team from Sayeret Matkal (the IDF’s elite reconnaissance unit) captured the area of Faid Airfield after a brief battle in which IDF officer Amitai Nachmani was killed. Beginning on October 21, the IDF operated the airfield for four months under the name “Nachshon Air Force Base – Wing 28”, a name proposed by Yigal Yadin.

On the very first day of the airfield’s operation, a Nesher fighter jet made an emergency landing there after being hit by Egyptian anti-aircraft fire. The landing was directed by the base commander, Eliezer “Cheeta” Cohen, who climbed onto the tarmac and guided the damaged aircraft using a radio. The next day, the first Karnaf (Hercules) transport plane landed at Nachshon Airfield, unloaded equipment, and shortly afterward took off again with wounded soldiers evacuated from the Suez City area.

On October 22, anti-aircraft battery 291 shot down an Egyptian MiG-21 in the area.

On October 24, 1973, as the war was nearing its end, a large-scale air battle took place over Nachshon Airfield between Egyptian MiG jets attempting to strike the base and Israeli Mirage III fighters. Before the Mirages arrived, the Israeli L/70 anti-aircraft batteries defending the base were given “free fire” authorization. The 40mm and 20mm anti-aircraft guns were readied. Soldiers from Anti-Aircraft Battalion 955, commanded by Major Menashe Gonen, identified four MiG aircraft approaching from the west, but then received a “cease fire” order—Israeli aircraft were in the air. The Mirage jets arrived from the direction of the Great Bitter Lake, and a rapid air battle ensued in which the Israeli planes shot down three MiG-19s within about four minutes. A fourth MiG was seen fleeing westward, but no additional kills were reported. The Israeli aircraft returned eastward.

The base played a significant role in the IDF’s operations on the western side of the Suez Canal, reducing the need for overland transport along the congested routes of Sinai. The airfield was used for medical evacuations, supply transport, reconnaissance and liaison flights, and flying soldiers to and from leave. Following the Israeli-Egyptian disengagement agreement, the base’s operations ceased. The last Israeli Air Force planes left the base on February 19, 1974. The base’s ground facilities were subsequently demolished, and the site was vacated.

== See also ==
- List of former Royal Air Force stations
- List of North African airfields during World War II
