= No. 108 Squadron RAF =

Defunct flying squadron of the Royal Air Force

- Active: November 1917 – July 1919; January 1937 – March 1945
- Country: United Kingdom
- Branch: Royal Air Force
- Mottos: Latin: Viribus contractis ("With gathered strength")

Insignia
- Squadron Badge heraldry: An oak leaf. The unit was formed at Stonehenge and it adopted an oak leaf as a badge being symbolic of strength and age.
- Squadron Codes: 108 (Jan 1937 – Oct 1938); MF (Oct 1938 – Apr 1939); LD (Sep 1939 – Apr 1940)

No. 108 Squadron RAF was a squadron of the Royal Flying Corps during the First World War which continued to serve with the Royal Air Force in the Second World War.

== First World War ==
The unit was formed at Stonehenge or the nearby Lake Down Aerodrome in November 1917, and was equipped with Airco DH.9 bombers.

In July 1918, the squadron went to Capelle, Dunkirk, equipped with DH.9s for day-bombing operations against targets in north-west Belgium. In October 1918, it moved to Bisseghem, Belgium, and remained based there until the Armistice. During its service overseas the squadron made 59 successful bombing raids, 40 reconnaissance flights, and two photographic flights; dropped approximately 70 tons of bombs, and shot down nine enemy aircraft (a further 20 were reported shot down, but were not confirmed).

== Between the wars ==
Disbanded in July 1919, the squadron did not reappear in the order of battle until January 1937, when it was re-formed as No. 108 (Bomber) Squadron at RAF Upper Heyford. Its initial equipment were Bristol Blenheim I bombers.

== Second World War ==
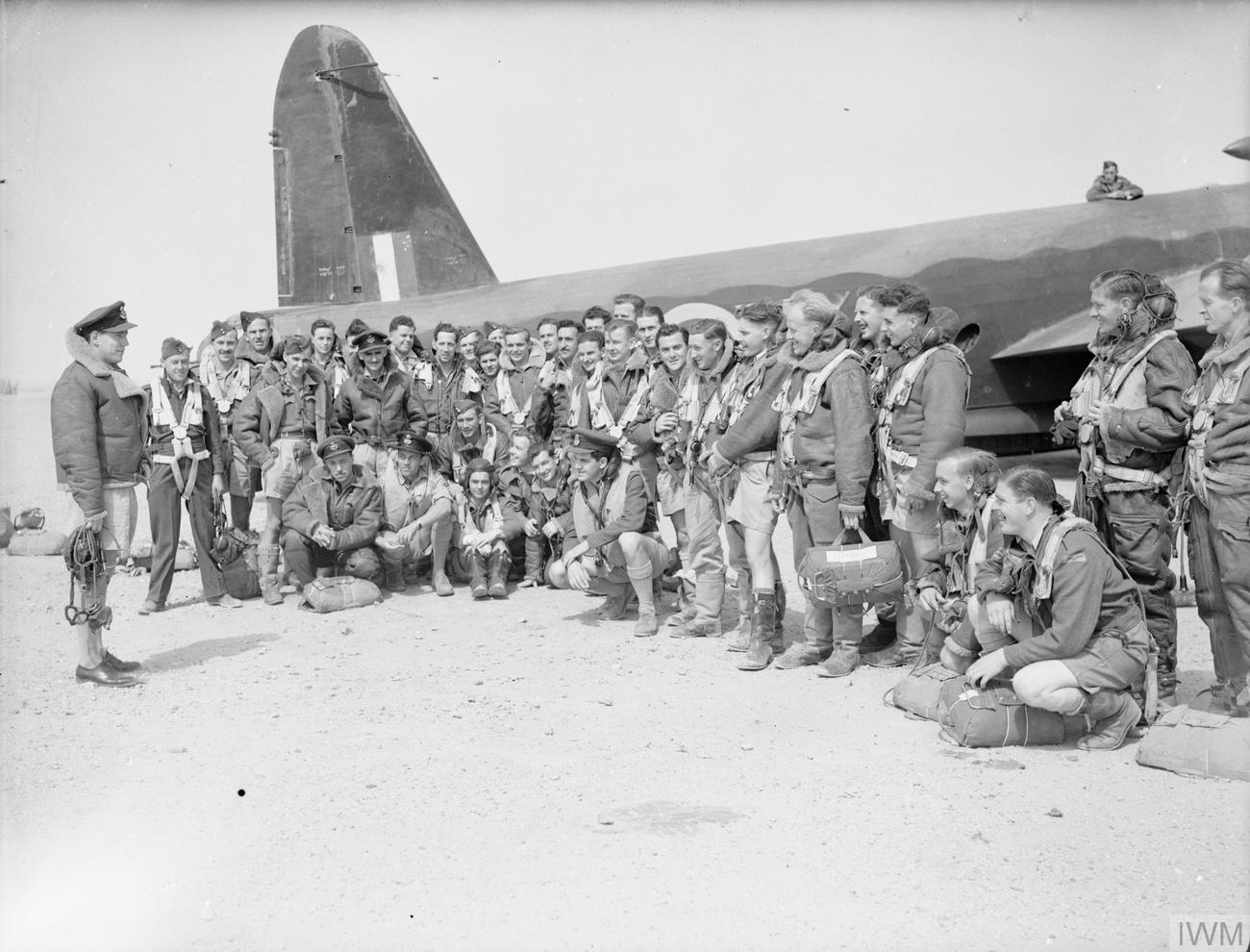
Wing Commander D. R. Bagnall (far left), Commanding Officer of No. 108 Squadron, addresses his crews in front of a Vickers Wellington Mark IC, before taking off from RAF Fayid, Egypt, on an operation.

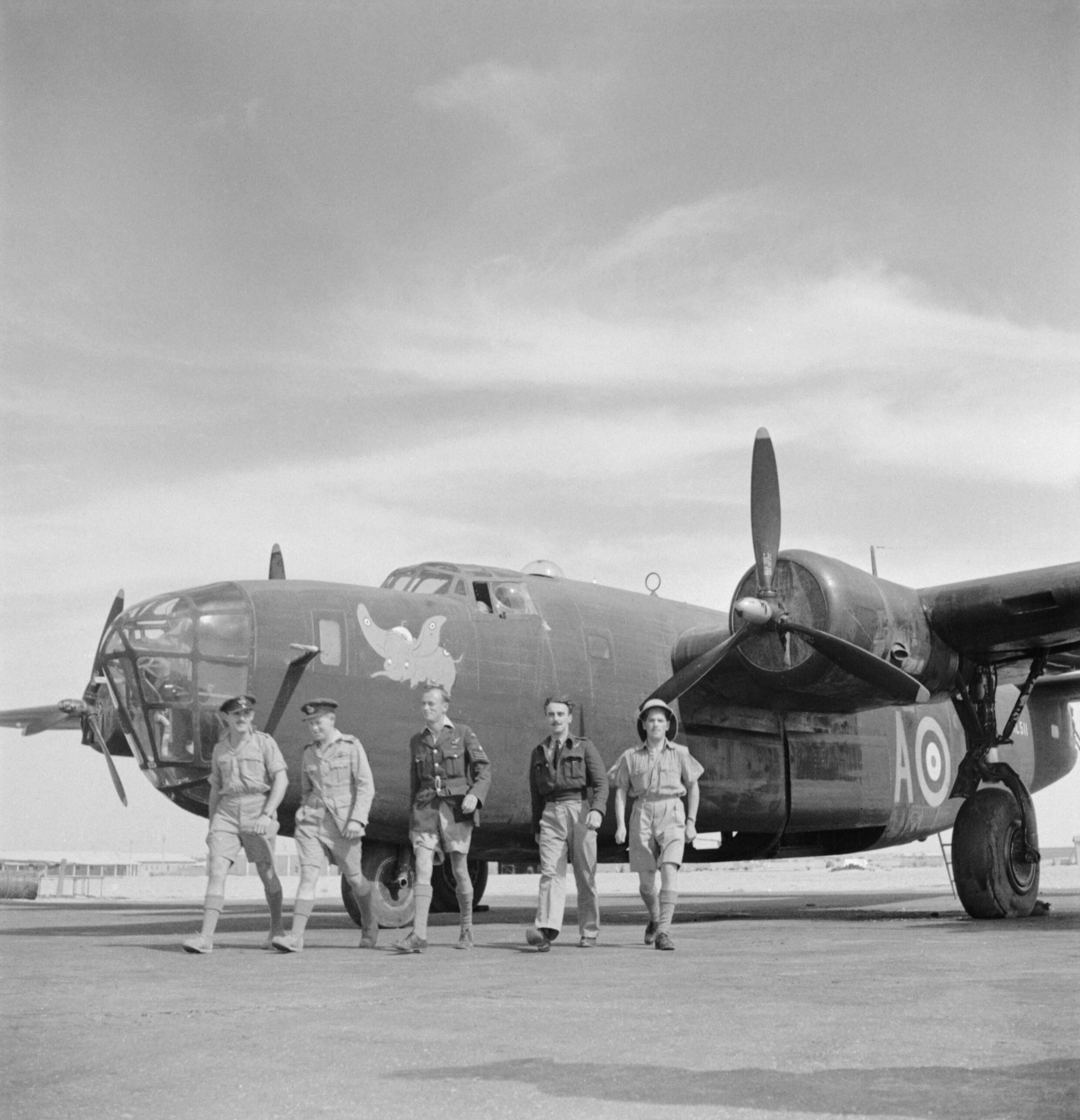
No. 108 Squadron Liberator crew in Egypt

On the day before the outbreak of the Second World War it became a 6 Group training squadron and in April 1940, was absorbed into No. 13 Operational Training Unit at RAF Bicester. The squadron relinquished its Blenheims in February 1940 to aid Finland in the Winter War.

On 1 August 1941, No. 108 reformed at RAF Kabrit, Egypt, as a night bomber squadron. Its Vickers Wellingtons began bombing raids on 22 September, targets being ports on the Libyan coast and in Greece. In November it began to receive Consolidated Liberators and these supplemented the Wellingtons until June 1942. On 18 December 1942 the squadron was reduced to a cadre which was disbanded on 25 December 1942. On 15 March 1943 No. 108 reformed at RAF Shandur as a night fighter squadron. Its Bristol Beaufighters flew night patrols over Egypt, Libya and Malta and were supplemented by de Havilland Mosquitoes in February 1944. The latter were used for intruder missions until withdrawn in July while the Beaufighters moved back to Libya for intruder operations over Greece and the Aegean. In October 1944 the squadron moved to Greece and became involved in the attempted Communist take-over of the country in December. After taking part in attacks on rebel positions until the uprising was quelled, the squadron gave up its aircraft and sailed for Italy in March 1945, disbanding on 28 March 1945.
