= 34 Squadron SAAF =

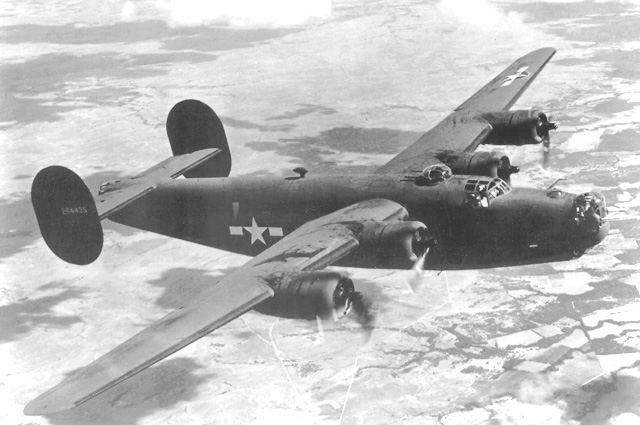
- Consolidated Vultee B-24 Liberator similar to that flown by 34 Squadron SAAF
- Active: 14 April 1944 – 15 December 1945
- Country: South Africa
- Branch: South African Air Force
- Role: Heavy Bomber Squadron
- Motto: "Initasela Zasebusiuku" (We Strike by Night)
- Equipment: Consolidated Vultee B-24 Liberator

Insignia
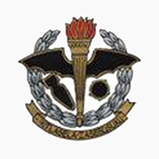
- 34 Squadron Badge

34 Squadron was a heavy bomber squadron of the South African Air Force during World War II. It was formed in Egypt on 14 April 1944 and operated from Egypt and Italy until the end of the war. It was equipped with Consolidated Vultee B-24 Liberator IVs.

In July 1944, the squadron moved from Egypt to Italy and formed part of No. 2 Wing (SAAF) along with 31 Squadron SAAF. The squadron's first operation was on the 21st; in addition, it operated in northern Italy, the Balkans, Austria and Southern France, as well as mine-laying operations along the Danube. The squadron was also involved in re-supply air drops to partisans in Yugoslavia (Operation Flotsam) as well as air supply drops to the defenders in the Warsaw uprising of August–September 1944.

The squadron returned to Egypt in September and was converted to a transport unit, flying supplies and passengers to and from northern Italy, Austria, Egypt and South Africa. It was disbanded on 15 December 1945.

Selected bombing targets engaged by 34 Squadron during WW2 (Red), Air supply drops (Black) and main operating base (Green)

== Notes and references ==
Footnotes

Citations
