= No. 160 Squadron RAF =

Defunct flying squadron of the Royal Air Force

- Active: 16 Jan 1942 – 30 Sep 1946
- Country: United Kingdom
- Branch: Royal Air Force
- Part of: No. 222 Group RAF, Air Command, South East Asia
- Motto(s): Sinhalese: Api soya paragasamu (Translated: "We seek and strike")

Insignia
- Squadron Badge heraldry: A Sinhalese lion rampant holding a Sinhalese sword
- Squadron Codes: BS (Dec 1944 – Oct 1946)

Aircraft flown
- Bomber: Consolidated Liberator
- Patrol: Consolidated Liberator
- Reconnaissance: Consolidated Liberator; Avro Lancaster
- Transport: Consolidated Liberator

No. 160 Squadron RAF was a Royal Air Force unit during the Second World War, when it flew for four years in a number of roles including heavy bomber, minelaying, reconnaissance, special operations and transport unit in the Middle East and South-East Asian theatre of World War II.

== History ==
=== First World War: False start ===
No. 160 Squadron was originally proposed on 9 May 1918 as a bomber squadron for deployment to France with DH.9As on 7 October, shortly afterwards amended to 20 October, but formation had not yet taken place when these plans were cancelled on 4 July. The formation was then rescheduled to take place on 20 September at Bristol (Filton) for deployment to France on 20 November, but this plan in its turn was suspended on 29 July and cancelled altogether on 17 August. The squadron thus never effectively formed during the First World War.

=== Second World War ===
==== To India via Palestine ====
No. 160 Squadron RAF was formed at RAF Thurleigh, Bedfordshire on 16 January 1942 as a heavy bomber/reconnaissance unit equipped with Consolidated Liberator aircraft. The squadron was posted to India on 12 February 1942, but without its aircraft and crews, who remained in England for training at RAF Polebrook, Northamptonshire. In June 1942 the crews and aircraft moved to the Middle East for bomber operations alongside No. 159 squadron. Whilst being based in Egypt and Palestine the squadron flew missions against targets in Libya and Crete. From November 1942 the squadron's crew and aircraft gradually moved to India, this being completed early February 1943, first mission was flown on 6 February over the Bay of Bengal. The squadron moved to Ceylon on 19 February, being based first at Ratmalana and later at Sigiriya, Kankesanturai and Minneriya. At first the squadron was involved in reconnaissance missions and minelaying and later became involved in dropping supplies to units operating behind enemy lines. When the war ended 160 squadron returned to Kankesanturai and served for a while in the transport role.

==== Back in the UK ====
On 23 June 1946, the return to the UK of the squadron was completed, and they were based at RAF Leuchars, Fife, Scotland, operating as a reconnaissance squadron. The squadron converted to Avro Lancaster GR.3s in August 1946, but was disbanded shortly after on 30 September 1946, being renumbered to No. 120 Squadron RAF.

== Aircraft operated ==
Aircraft operated by no. 160 Squadron RAF, data from
From	To	Aircraft	Version
May 1942	January 1943	Consolidated Liberator	Mk.II
November 1942	October 1945	Consolidated Liberator	Mk.III
June 1943	November 1945	Consolidated Liberator	Mk.V
January 1944	January 1945	Consolidated Liberator	Mk.VI
October 1945	September 1946	Consolidated Liberator	Mk.VIII
August 1946	September 1946	Avro Lancaster	GR.3

== Squadron bases ==
Bases and airfields used by no. 160 Squadron RAF, data from
From	To	From	To	Base	Remark
16 January 1942	12 February 1942			RAF Thurleigh, Bedfordshire	Ground personnel
		January 1942	26 April 1942	RAF Polebrook, Northamptonshire	Air echelon, training at 1653 HCU
12 February 1942	4 June 1942			Left for India	Ground personnel
		26 April 1942	7 May 1942	RAF Lyneham, Wiltshire	Air echelon
		7 May 1942	30 May 1942	RAF Nutts Corner, County Antrim, Northern Ireland	Air echelon
		30 May 1942	8 June 1942	RAF Lyneham, Wiltshire	Air echelon
4 June 1942	17 June 1942			RAF Drigh Road, Karachi	Ground personnel
		8 June 1942	11 June 1942	Left for Middle East	Air echelon
17 June 1942	22 November 1942			RAF Quetta, Balochistan	Ground personnel
		11 June 1942	16 September 1942	RAF Fayid, Egypt	Air echelon (absorbed into 159 sqn)
		16 September June 1942	8 November 1942	RAF Aqir, Palestine	Air echelon
		8 November 1942	15 January 1943	Shandur, Egypt	Air echelon (leftovers absorbed by 178 sqn)
22 November 1942	19 February 1943			RAF Salbani, Paschim Medinipur, Bengal	Ground personnel first, later joined by greater part of air echelon
19 February 1943	2 August 1943			RAF Ratmalana, Ceylon	Det. at RAF Sigiriya, Ceylon
2 August 1943	31 July 1944			RAF Sigiriya, Ceylon	Dets. at RAF Cuttack, Orissa; RAF Ratmalana, Ceylon; RAF Vavuniya, Ceylon and RAF Gan (Addu Atoll), the Maldives
1 August 1944	7 February 1945			RAF Kankesanturai, Ceylon	Dets. at Addu Atoll, the Maldives and RAF Kandy (Senkadagalapura), Ceylon
7 February 1945	17 October 1945			RAF Minneriya, Ceylon	Det. at RAF Ramree Island, Burma
17 October 1945	23 June 1946			RAF Kankesanturai, Ceylon	
23 June 1946	30 September 1946			RAF Leuchars, Fife, Scotland	

== Commanding officers ==
Officers commanding no. 160 Squadron RAF, data from
From	To	Name
March 1943	January 1944	W/Cdr. C.A. Butler
January 1944	November 1944	W/Cdr. G.R. Brady
November 1944	May 1945	W/Cdr. J.N. Stacy, DSO, DFC
May 1945	September 1945	W/Cdr. G. MacKenzie
September 1945	September 1946	W/Cdr. R.D. Williams
