= 31 Squadron SAAF =

31 Squadron
- Consolidated Liberator similar to that flown by the squadron in the Mediterranean.
- Active: January 1944 – December 1945; January 1982 – December 1992
- Country: South Africa
- Branch: South African Air Force
- Role: Coastal Bomber/Reconnaissance • Heavy Bomber • Transport Helicopter
- Garrison/HQ: Foggia 1944, Hoedspruit 1992
- Motto: Absque metu (Without Fear)

Insignia
- Squadron Identification Code: KK 1944–1945
- Insignia

31 Squadron was initially a World War II Coastal bomber/reconnaissance squadron South African Air Force. It was later converted to a heavy bomber squadron that operated from bases in the Mediterranean from January 1944 until the end of the war. On conclusion of hostilities, the squadron was used to ferry liberated POW's from Italy back to Britain and disbanded South African troops from Italy to Egypt. It was disbanded on 15 December 1945. It was resurrected as a medium and light helicopter squadron in 1982 and operated from AFB Hoedspruit until its final disbandment on 4 December 1992.

== History ==
=== Initial Coastal Bomber role ===
31 Squadron was formed in December 1939 by amalgamating 13 (B.R.) Squadron (Note: Coastal Bomber/Reconnaissance Squadron) (re-designated as "A" Flight) and 14 (B.R.) Squadron (re-designated as "B" Flight) as a Coastal Squadron. The squadron flew Junkers Ju 86's and Blenheim Mk 1's. On 10 June 1940 the Blenheims attacked the Italian ship SS Timavo which was forced to run aground 5 miles north of St. Mary's Hill, north of Durban. The Junkers were replaced by Avro Ansons and on 1 September 1940 the squadron again split with "A" Flight re-designated as 31 Coastal Reconnaissance Flight flying from Durban and "B" Flight as 33 Coastal Reconnaissance Flight flying from Port Elizabeth. On 1 July 1942, 31 Coastal Reconnaissance Flight was disbanded and renamed No. 22 Torpedo Bomber Reconnaissance Squadron.

=== Heavy Bomber Squadron ===
Selected bombing targets engaged by 31 Squadron B-24's during WW2 (red star), mines (red cross), air supply drops (black) and main operating base (Green)

==== Egypt, Crete and the Aegean ====
The squadron was re-formed at Zwartkop Air Station in South Africa in early January 1944 and was moved to Almaza in Egypt on 30 January 1944. Ground crews started arriving from 19 February 1944 and air crews were sent to No. 1675 Conversion Unit at Lydda, Palestine to be converted onto the Consolidated B-24 Liberator bomber. On 19 April 1944 an advance party set off to establish a base camp forty kilometers north of Cairo, accordingly named Kilo 40. The first aircraft arrived at Kilo 40 on 27 April 1944 and the squadron was joined by 34 Squadron at Kilo 40 – both squadrons being placed under command of the newly established No. 2 Wing, SAAF. Operations began on 27 May 1944, flying bomber missions over Crete and the Aegean, with 31 Sqn's first target being the runway at Kastelli Pediada in eastern Crete.

==== Central Europe missions ====
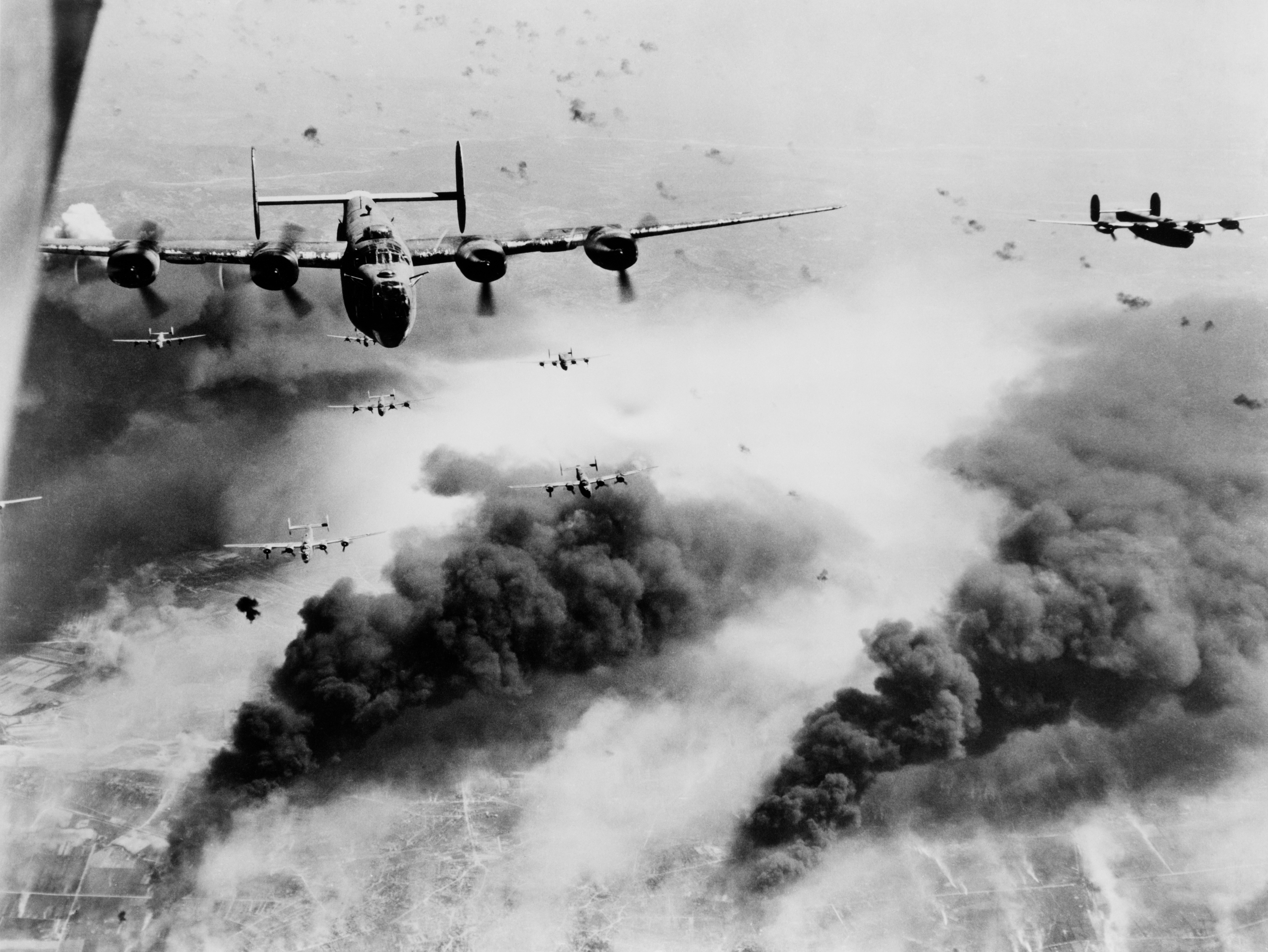
B-24's over Ploiesti oil fields, Romania

From 16 June 1944 the squadron started to move to the Celone airfield close to Foggia in southern Italy to join No. 205 Group RAF, RAF together with 178 and 614 RAF Squadrons. The area of operations was expanded to include strategic targets in the Balkans, Hungary, Austria, Romania and northern Italy. The squadron was also frequently tasked with air supply to partisans in Yugoslavia as well as for mine-laying missions on the Danube.

==== Supporting the Warsaw Uprising ====
In the summer of 1944 the squadron took part in the invasion of Southern France. It was also one of the squadrons (with 34 Squadron and 178 Sqn RAF) that took part in the long-range airlift of supplies to the Polish Home Army in Warsaw. Between 12 and 17 August these squadrons lost 17 of the ninety-three aircraft sent to Warsaw with eight of these losses being from 31 Squadron.

On Sunday 13 August 1944, 10 crews of 31 Squadron were ordered to Brindisi and briefed for a 3,200 km flight plan from Foggia to Warsaw to drop supplies for the encircled Polish resistance. The supplies were packed in 12 canisters per aircraft, each weighing 150 kg containing light machine guns, ammunition, hand grenades, radio equipment, food and medical supplies. There were 196 11-hour night flights from Brindisi and Foggia in Italy (total between 31 and 34 Squadrons) to and from Warsaw from 4 August to early September 1944. Of the 80 aircraft involved, 31 were shot down, 17 during the weekend of 13–16 August. Sixty-nine South Africans were killed and twenty-five SAAF Liberators were shot down. Fifty percent of the aircraft were from the RAF, and 36% of the total force was South African. Air Marshal Sir John Slessors, the Allied air commander in the Mediterranean, later put the losses at one bomber lost for every ton of supplies dropped.

==== Transport role at the end of the war ====
After the end of the fighting the squadron converted to transport duties, operating a shuttle service from Italy in which liberated Allied prisoners of war were flown from Italy back to the United Kingdom and South African troops preparing to return home were flown to Egypt. In September 1945 the squadron moved to Shallufa in Egypt, from where it operated as a transport squadron within the Mediterranean until 5 December 1945. It was disbanded on 15 December 1945.

=== Helicopter Role ===
The squadron was reformed on 4 January 1982 at AFB Hoedspruit, operating Puma and Alouette III helicopters. Activities included crime-prevention operations in support of the South African Police, search and rescue, mercy flights, VIP transportation and firefighting. The squadron also played an active part in the Border War, with deployments to the operational region between 1982 and 1989, carrying out operations in both South West Africa and southern Angola. The Pumas were replaced by the Oryx on 12 February 1991, but due to ongoing cost cutting – it was disbanded at Hoedspruit on 4 December 1992.

== Aircraft ==
Aircraft flown by 31 Squadron
Note: Aircraft type photographs may not necessarily represent aircraft of the same mark or actual aircraft belonging to the squadron.
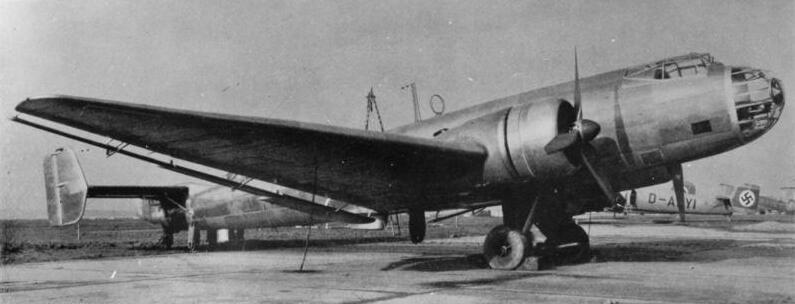
Junkers Ju-86
Dec 1939 – Sep 1940

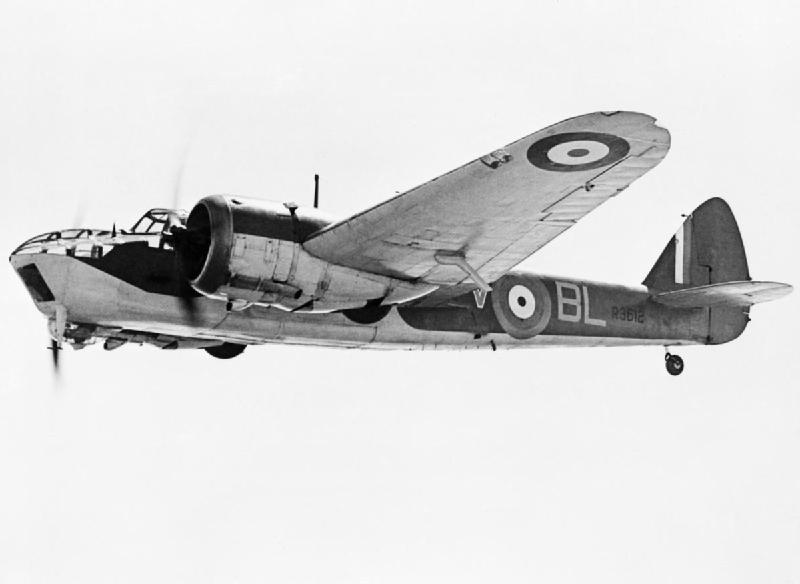
Bristol Blenheim
Dec 1939 – Jul 1942

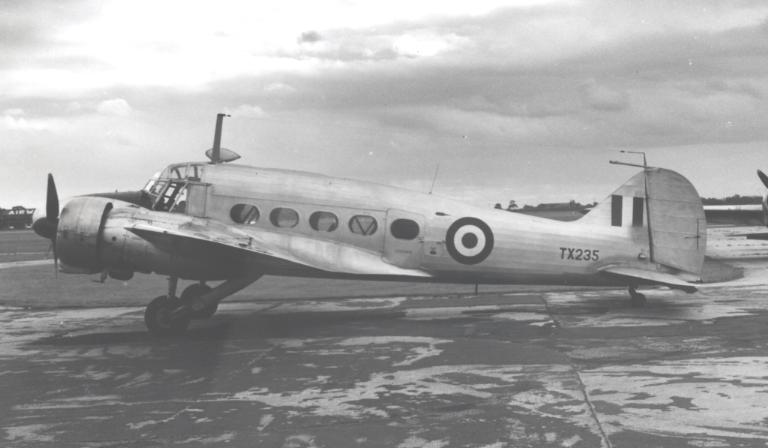
Avro Anson
Sep 1940 – Jul 1942

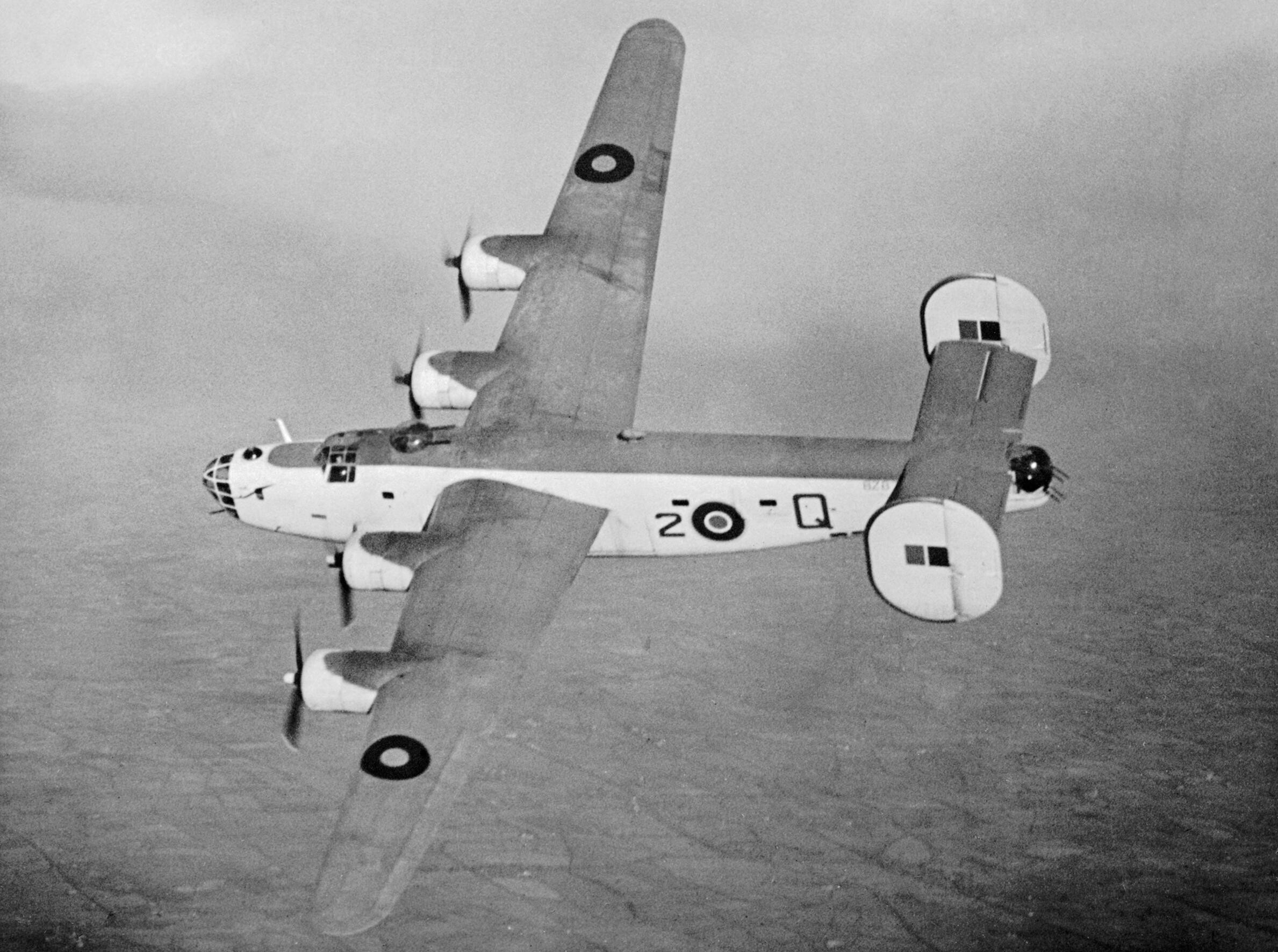
Consolidated B-24 Liberator
Jan 1944 – Dec 1945

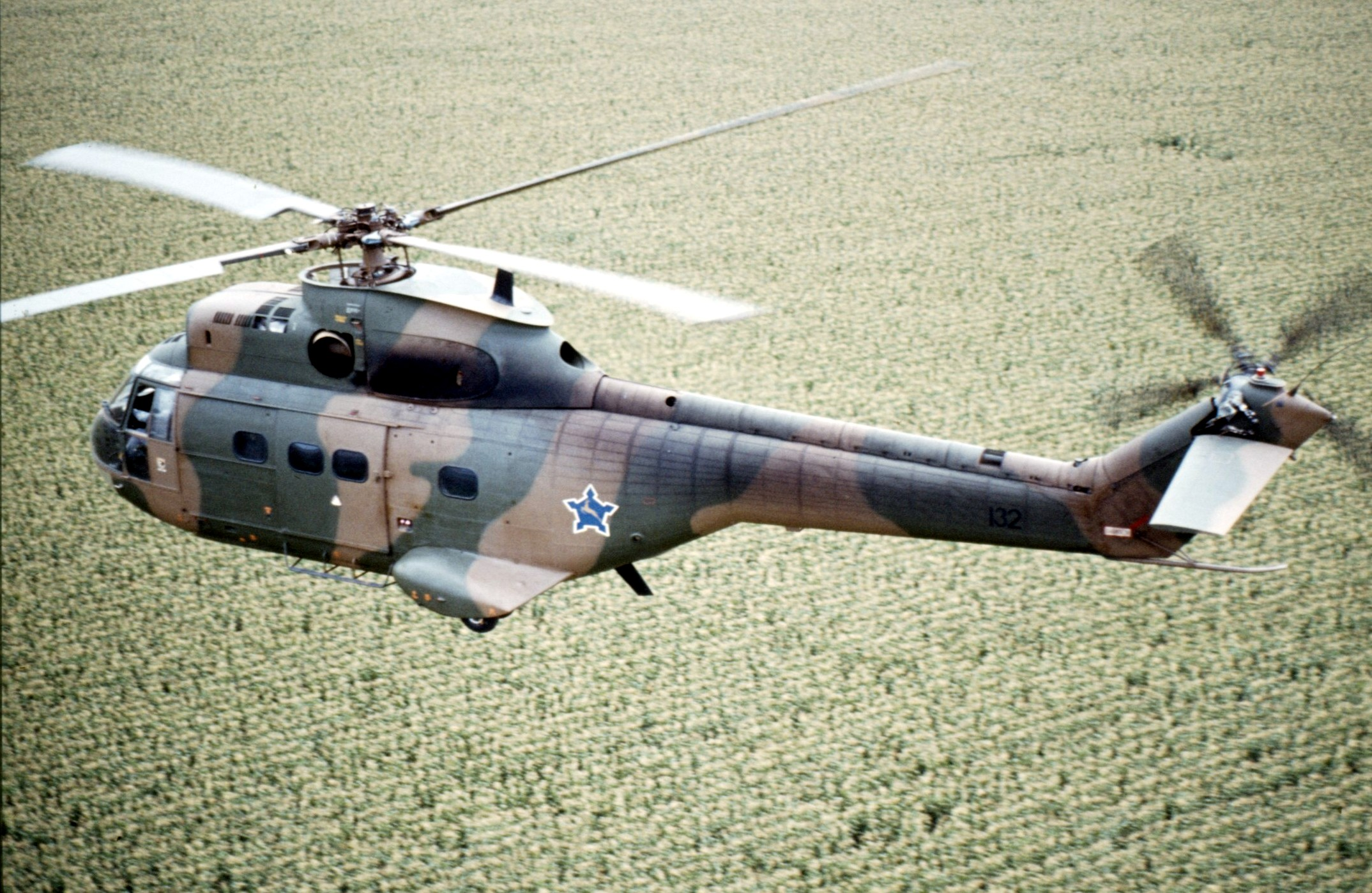
SA-330 Puma
Jan 1982 – Feb 1991

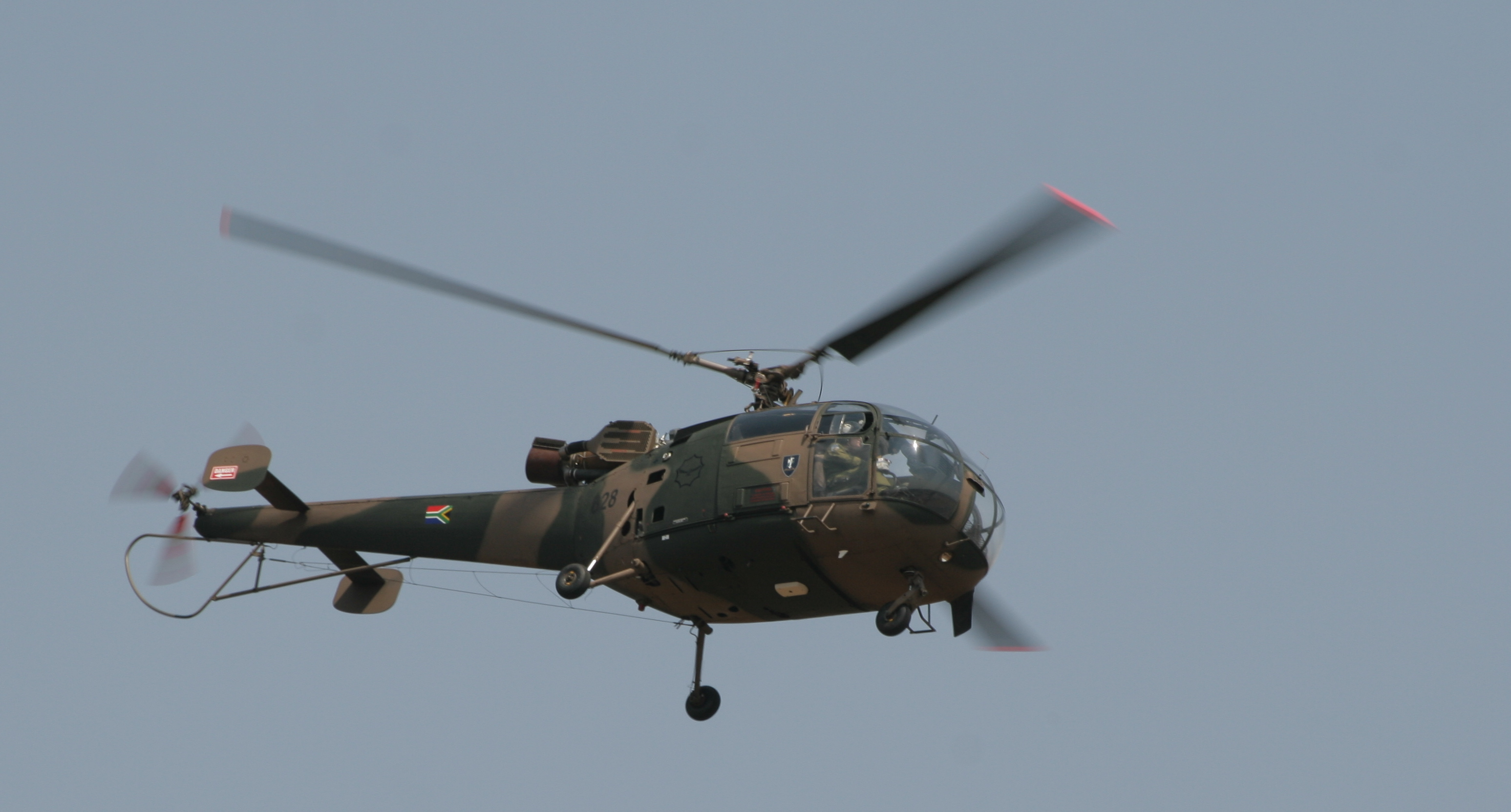
Alouette III
Jan 1982 – Dec 1992

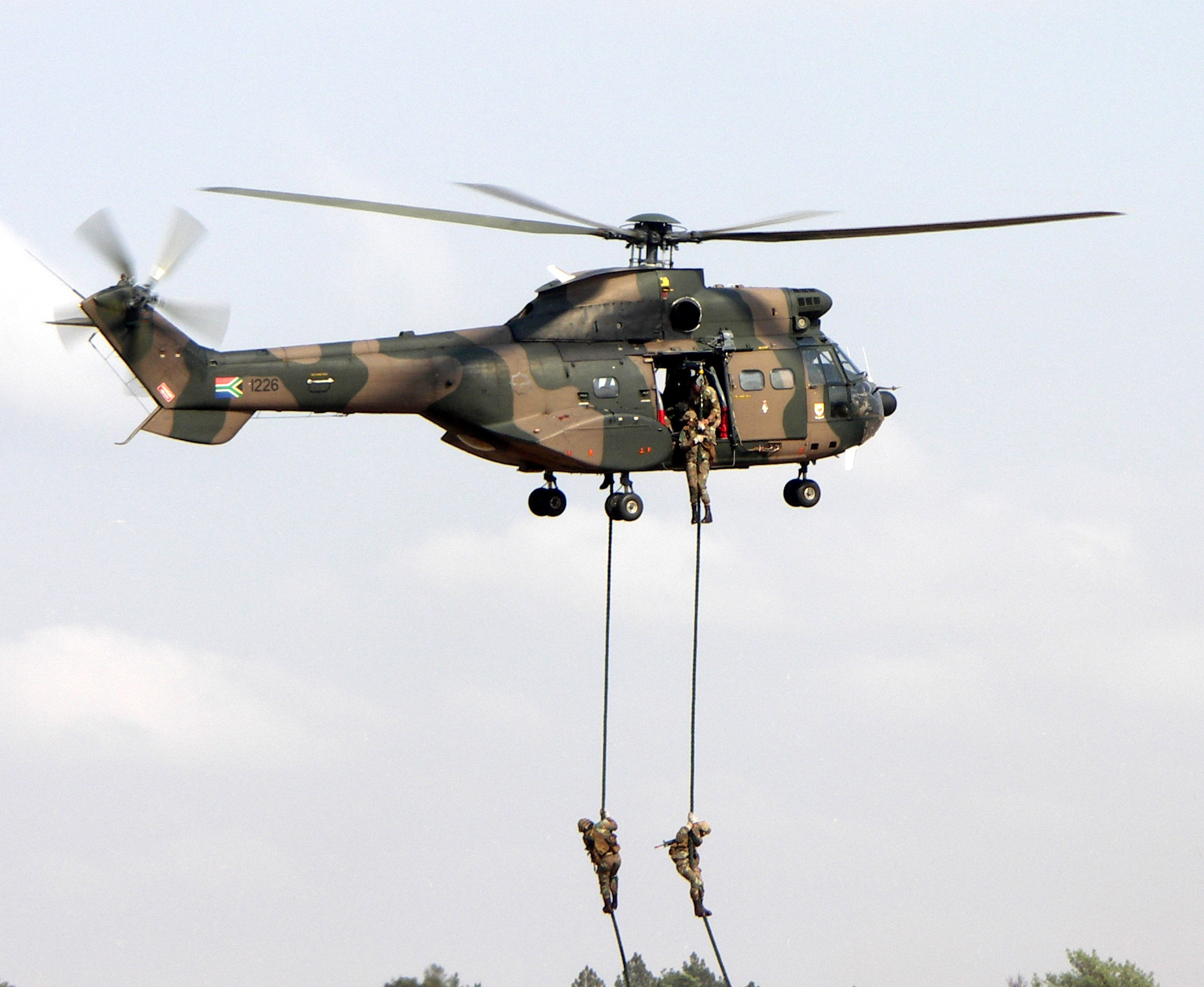
SA-330 Oryx
Feb 1991 – Dec 1992

== Notes and references ==
Footnotes

Citations
