= No. 624 Squadron RAF =

- Active: 22 Sep 1943 – 5 Sep 1944; 28 Dec 1944 – 30 Nov 1945
- Country: United Kingdom
- Branch: Royal Air Force
- Role: Special duties Mine spotting

Insignia
- Squadron Badge heraldry: No official badge authorised
- Squadron Codes: As far as known no markings were carried by 624 sqn during either period of service

No. 624 Squadron RAF was at first a special duties squadron of the Royal Air Force during World War II. It was later in the war tasked with mine-spotting, until disbanded at the end of the war.

== History ==
=== Special duties ===
No. 624 Squadron was formed by raising No. 1575 Flight RAF to squadron status at Blida in Algeria, North Africa at the end of September 1943. The squadron continued to carry out special duties operations formerly done by 1575 flight into Italy, Southern France, Yugoslavia and Czechoslovakia. These operations included supply dropping and the insertion of agents to the resistance. For these duties the squadron operated at first with Lockheed Venturas and Handley Page Halifaxes, and later Short Stirling Mk.IVs. As a result of the allied advances in France and Italy, the need for 624 squadron in this role had declined and it was therefore disbanded on 5 September 1944.

=== Mine spotting ===
No. 624 Squadron was reformed on 28 December 1944 at Grottaglie in Italy. Equipped with Walrus amphibious planes, it was now tasked with the role of mine-spotting along the Italian and Greek coasts. It had detachments and bases at Foggia, Hassani, Falconara, Rosignano, Treviso, Hal Far, Sedes and Littorio, until the squadron finally disbanded on 30 November 1945.

== Aircraft operated ==
Aircraft operated by no. 624 Squadron RAF, data from
From	To	Aircraft	Variant
September 1943	October 1943	Lockheed Ventura	Mk.II
September 1943	September 1944	Handley Page Halifax	Mk.II
September 1943	February 1944	Handley Page Halifax	Mk.V
June 1944	September 1944	Short Stirling	Mk.IV
January 1945	November 1945	Supermarine Walrus	Mk.I
March 1945	November 1945	Hurricane	Mk.IIb
April 1945	November 1945	Avro Anson	Mk.I

== Commanding officers ==
Officers commanding No. 624 Squadron RAF, data from
From	To	Name
September 1943	November 1943	S/Ldr. J.B. Austin DFC, Acting Squadron Commander until arrival of WC Stanbury, DSO, DFC
November 1943	September 1944	W/Cdr. C.S.G. Stanbury, DSO, DFC
December 1944	November 1945	S/Ldr. G.M. Gallagher ( became a mine hunter squadron )
