= No. 178 Squadron RAF =

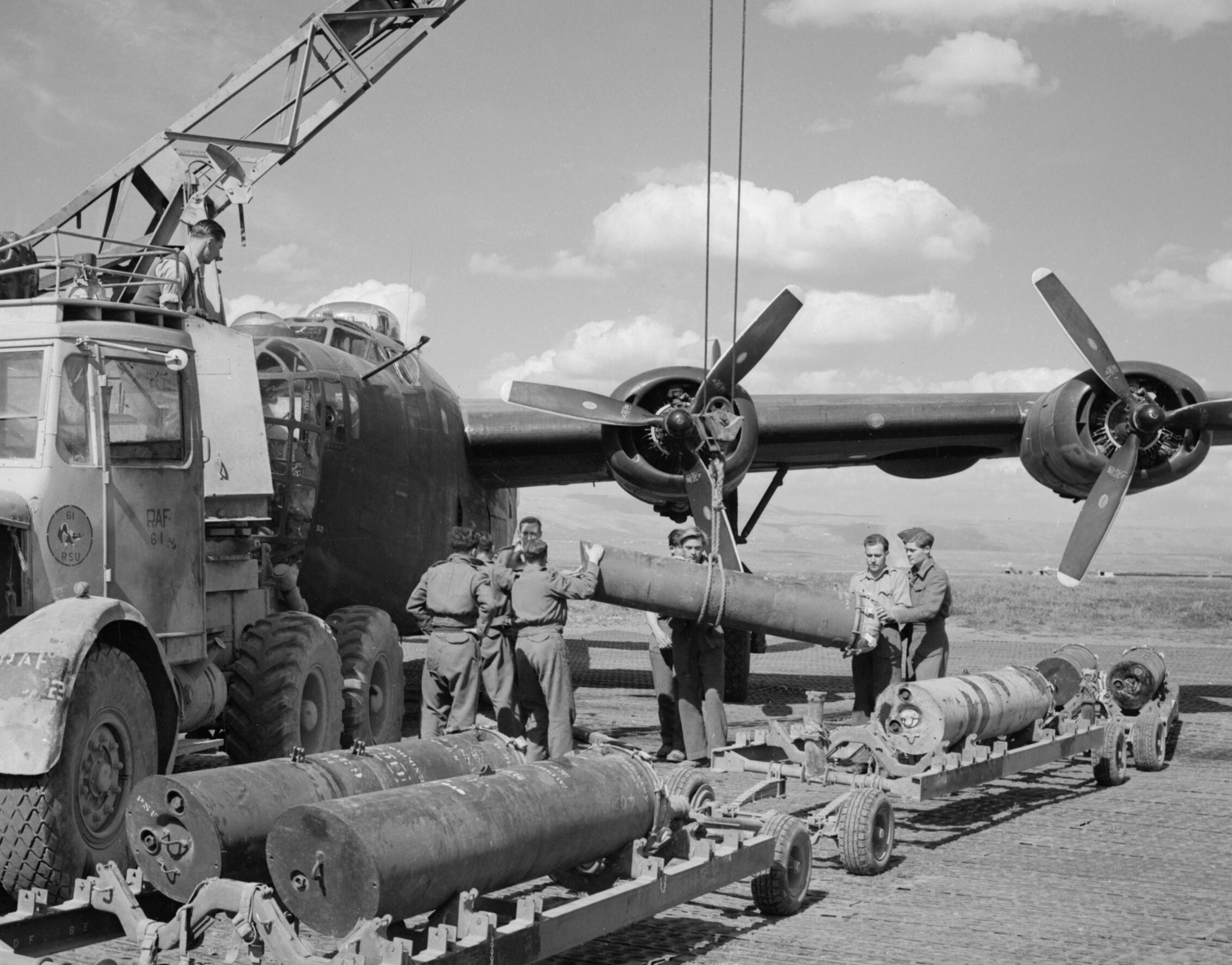
- No. 178 Squadron ground crew preparing to load a Liberator bomber with mines
- Active: 15 Jan 1943 – 15 April 1946
- Country: United Kingdom
- Branch: Royal Air Force
- Motto: Latin: Irae emissarii (Emissaries of wrath)

Insignia
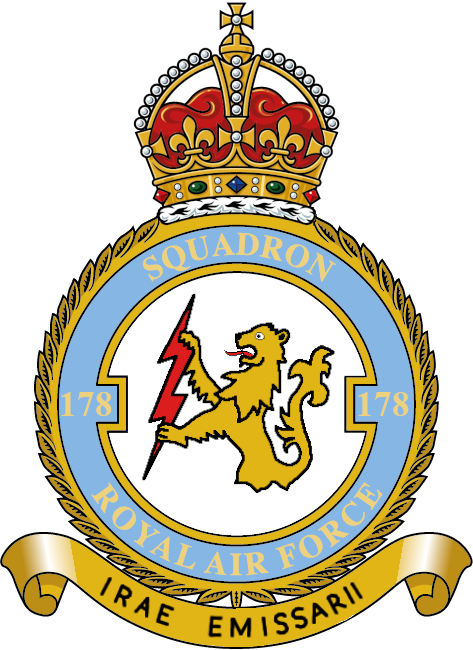
- Squadron badge (Note: An erased lion holding a flash of lightning.)

No. 178 Squadron RAF was a Royal Air Force Squadron that was a bomber unit based in Egypt, Libya and Italy in World War II.

== History ==
=== Formation in World War II ===
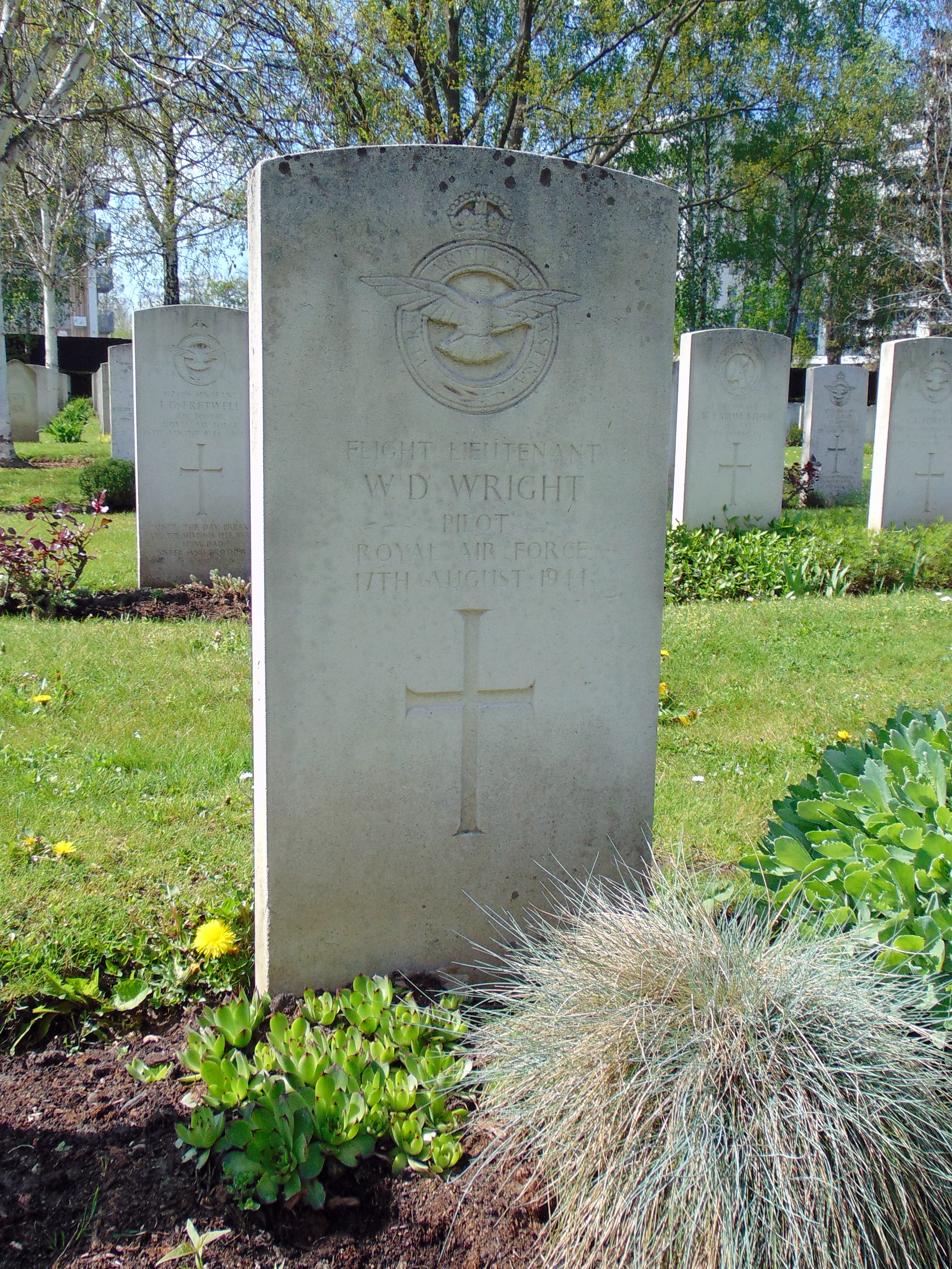
W.D. Wright pilot, 178 Squadron RAF, war cemetery in Kraków

The Squadron was equipped with Liberators at RAF Shandur, Egypt on 15 January 1943 and then moved to Libya, then Italy from March 1944. The squadron was actively involved in the air drop operations in support of the besieged Polish Home Army in Warsaw in 1944.

=== Postwar ===
In November 1945 the Liberators were replaced by Lancasters at Fayid, Egypt. It was disbanded upon renumbering as No. 70 Squadron RAF on 15 April 1946.

== Aircraft operated ==
Aircraft operated by no. 178 Squadron RAF
From	To	Aircraft	Variant
Jan 1943	Dec 1943	Consolidated B-24 Liberator	II
May 1943	Sep 1943	Handley Page Halifax	II
Sep 1943	Jul 1944	Consolidated B-24 Liberator	III
Jan 1944	Jan 1946	Consolidated B-24 Liberator	VI
Nov 1945	Apr 1946	Avro Lancaster	III
