= Listed buildings in Hilton, Derbyshire =

Hilton is a civil parish in the South Derbyshire district of Derbyshire, England. The parish contains seven listed buildings that are recorded in the National Heritage List for England. All the listed buildings are designated at Grade II, the lowest of the three grades, which is applied to "buildings of national importance and special interest". The parish contains the village of Hilton and the surrounding countryside. Apart from a public house, all the listed buildings are houses or farmhouses.

== Buildings ==
| Name and location | Photograph | Date | Notes |
|---|---|---|---|
| Wakelyn Old Hall; 52.87271°N 1.63811°W | | 1573 | A timber framed house on a stone plinth with plaster infill, the ground floor largely rebuilt in brick, and with a roof of tile and slate. There are two storeys and attics, an H-shaped plan, and a front of three bays, the outer bays projecting with jettied gables. On the upper floor are three oriel windows, and on the right return are two jettied gables. The rear has been largely rebuilt in brick, and inside is an inglenook fireplace. |
| The Old Talbot Inn; 52.87306°N 1.63608°W | | Early 17th century | The public house has a cruck-framed core, it is encased in rendered brick, and has a sawtooth eaves band and a tile roof. There are two storeys and three bays. On the front is a doorway with a bracketed porch roof, some of the windows are sashes, and others are later replacements. Inside there are two full cruck trusses and the base of a third, large inglenook fireplaces, and timber partitions. |
| Hargate House Farmhouse; 52.87019°N 1.61929°W | — | Mid 18th century | The farmhouse is in rendered brick on a plinth, with a floor band, a coved eaves band, and a tile roof with rendered coped gables. There are two storeys and attics, and three bays. On the front is a porch and a door with a fanlight, and the windows are sashes. Inside, there are inglenook fireplaces. |
| Hilton Fields Farmhouse; 52.88864°N 1.63578°W | — | Early 19th century | The farmhouse is in red brick with a dentilled eaves band and a tile roof. There are two storeys and attics, and two bays. In the centre is a porch, and above it is a small square segment-headed single-light window. The other windows are three-light casements. |
| Hilton Lodge; 52.87889°N 1.61789°W | — | Early 19th century | A house, possibly with an 18th-century core, in rendered and painted brick, and a hipped slate roof. There are two storeys and an irregular plan, with fronts of three and five bays, and most of the windows are sashes with pointed heads and Gothic tracery. On the south front are two full-height segmental bay windows, and on the west front is a single-storey bow window with a balcony. To the south is a gabled porch, and a doorway with a pointed head and circles in the spandrels. At the rear is a tall water tower with a hipped roof. |
| Lodge Cottage, Hilton Lodge; 52.87963°N 1.61794°W | — | Early 19th century | The lodge cottage is in painted brick, and has a tile roof with overhanging eaves and decorative bargeboards. There is a single storey and three bays. On the north front are three windows with pointed heads, and the west front has a central gabled porch flanked by small windows with pointed heads. |
| Sudale and Hazeldene; 52.87290°N 1.64679°W | — | Early 19th century | A pair of estate cottages in rendered brick on a plinth, with a lintel band and a tile roof. There is a single storey and attics, and each cottage has one bay. In the centre is a semicircular-headed recess with sawtooth edging containing two round-headed doorways with voussoirs, raised imposts, and blind fanlights. Flanking these are pointed arches containing casement windows, and in the attics are half-dormers with four-centred arched heads, and Y-tracery. |
