= Edye Rolleston Manning =

Australian Air Force officer

- Born: 14 February 1889; Sydney, Australia
- Died: 26 April 1957 (aged 68)
- Military career
- Allegiance: United Kingdom
- Branch: British Army (1914–18); Royal Air Force (1918–45)
- Service years: 1914–1935; 1939–1945
- Rank: Air Commodore
- Commands: No. 221 Group RAF (1941); RAF Manston (1933–36); RAF Hornchurch (1930–33); No. 7 Squadron (1928–29); RAF Northolt (1927–28); No. 6 Squadron (1922–24); No. 6 Stores Depot (1919–20)
- Conflicts: First World War; Second World War
- Awards: Commander of the Order of the British Empire; Distinguished Service Order; Military Cross

Air Commodore Edye Rolleston Manning CBE DSO MC (14 February 1889 – 26 April 1957) was an Australian-born senior officer in the Royal Air Force. In the early days of the Second World War he was tasked with establishing a string of airfields in the Far East from Lashio to Mingladon.

== Early life ==
Edye Rolleston Manning was born in Australia on 14 February 1889, the son of William Alexander Manning, a solicitor practising in Sydney, Australia. He was educated at Bedford Modern School in England before going on to study medicine at the University of Edinburgh.

== Military career ==
When the First World War broke out, Manning ceased his studies at Edinburgh and joined the cavalry, serving in France and Belgium with the 15th Hussars. Frustrated by the stalemate of trench warfare he transferred to the Royal Flying Corps where he attained RAeC Certificate No. 2253 on 9 October 1916. He was wounded at the Battle of the Somme in July 1916 while serving with No. 3 Squadron.

As Commanding Officer of No. 6 Squadron, Manning was responsible for the evacuation of the British High Commissioner from Suliemanieh in Kurdistan, after which he was made a Companion of the Distinguished Service Order. In 1928 he chose to go on half-pay in order to attempt a flight from England to Australia in a Westland Widgeon he owned privately. He got as far as Tunis before crashing at Lebda; Manning was uninjured but his plane was a write-off and he was forced to abandon the attempt.

After his aborted flight, Manning became Officer Commanding of RAF Hornchurch (1930) and RAF Manston (1933) before retiring in 1935 to become a stockbroker in Sydney. At the advent of the Second World War he was persuaded to return to the Royal Air Force, becoming Officer Commanding No. 221 Group (RAF) as a group captain in March 1941, establishing a "string of airfields stretching from Lashio to Mingladon". In January 1942 he was appointed Air Commodore of the Group.

Manning died on 26 April 1957. There is a photographic portrait of Manning at the National Portrait Gallery, London.
