= First DCLI Cemetery, The Bluff =

CWGC cemetery in Ypres, Belgium

- Commonwealth War Graves Commission
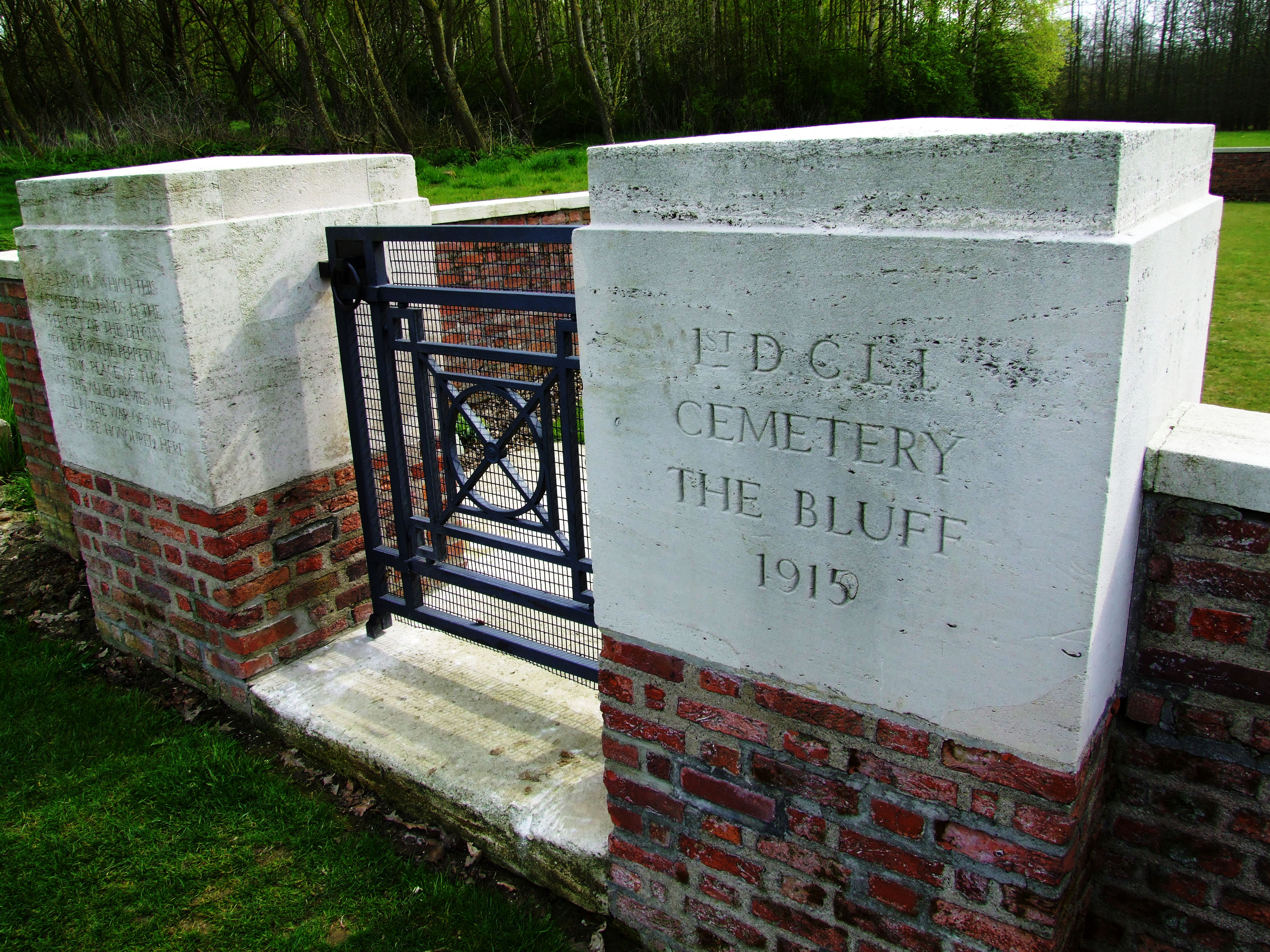
- Used for those deceased 1915
- Established: 1915
- Location: 50°49′14″N 02°54′47″E near Ypres, West Flanders, Belgium
- Designed by: J R Truelove
- Total burials: 76

Burials by nation
- Allies of World War I: United Kingdom: 76

Burials by war
- World War I: 76

UNESCO World Heritage Site
- Official name: Funerary and memory sites of the First World War (Western Front)
- Type: Cultural
- Criteria: i, ii, vi
- Designated: 2023 (45th session)
- Reference no.: 1567-FL21

First DCLI Cemetery, The Bluff is a Commonwealth War Graves Commission burial ground for the dead of the First World War located near The Bluff south of Ypres (Ieper) in Belgium on the Western Front. It takes its name from the Duke of Cornwall's Light Infantry (DCLI).

== Immediate area ==
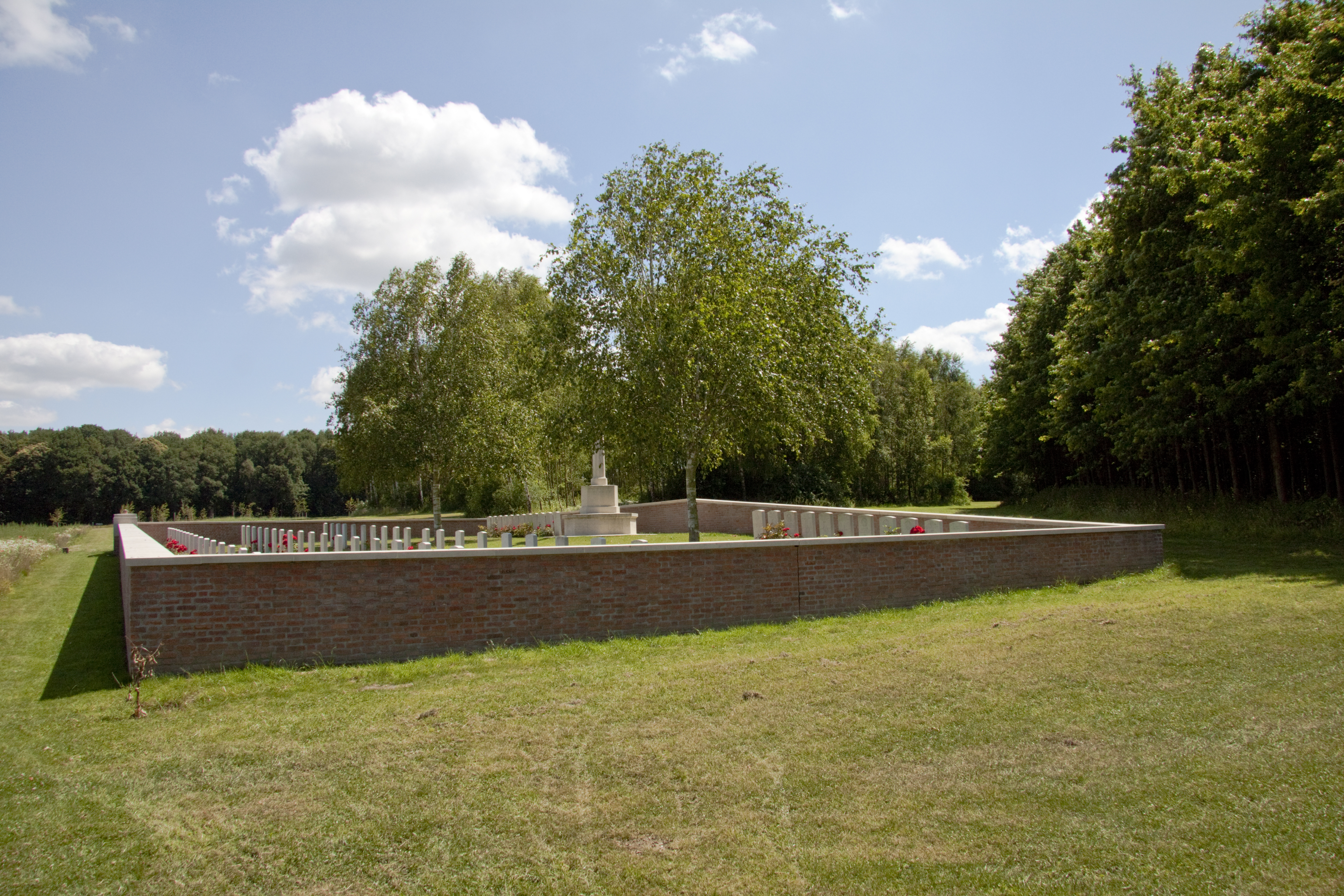
Overview

The area where the cemetery stands, known by soldiers as "The Bluff", is an artificial ridge in the landscape created by spoil from failed attempts to dig a canal. With the additional height in an otherwise relatively flat landscape, The Bluff was an important military objective. German forces took The Bluff in February 1916, and it was recaptured by the 14th (Light) Division on 2 March. In July 1916, the Germans detonated a mine under the ridge, but did not capture it. The Germans took The Bluff during the Spring Offensive of 1918, and it finally returned to Allied hands on 28 September after a push by the 14th (Light) Division. The area is now a provincial nature reserve and picnic area called "Provinciaal Domein Palingbeek".

== Foundation ==
The cemetery here was founded by the Duke of Cornwall's Light Infantry (DCLI) before the fighting of 1916. At the time of the armistice it contained burials only from the DCLI but the cemetery was expanded by concentration of graves from the former battlefields.

The cemetery was designed by J R Truelove. The cemetery grounds were assigned to the United Kingdom in perpetuity by King Albert I of Belgium in recognition of the sacrifices made by the British Empire in the defence and liberation of Belgium during the war.

== Other cemeteries on "The Bluff" ==
- Hedge Row Trench Commonwealth War Graves Commission Cemetery
- Woods Commonwealth War Graves Commission Cemetery
