= Hilton, Derbyshire =

Village in Derbyshire, England

Coordinates: 52.871°N 1.637°W

Hilton
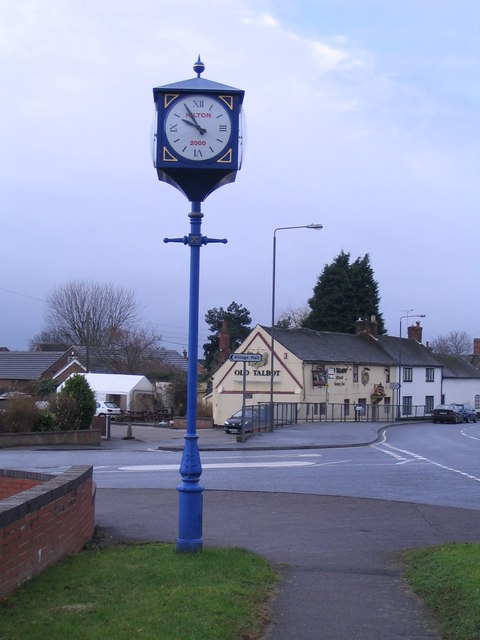
- Hilton Millennium Clock was removed in March 2017 due to H&S concerns

- Location within Derbyshire
- Population: 8,266 (civil parish, 2021)
- OS grid reference: SK245305
- District: South Derbyshire
- Shire county: Derbyshire
- Region: East Midlands
- Country: England
- Sovereign state: United Kingdom
- Post town: DERBY
- Postcode district: DE65
- Dialling code: 01283
- Police: Derbyshire
- Fire: Derbyshire
- Ambulance: East Midlands
- UK Parliament: Derbyshire Dales

Hilton is a village and civil parish in the South Derbyshire district of Derbyshire, England. The population at the 2021 Census (including Marston on Dove) was 8,266.

== History ==
Hilton was mentioned in the Domesday Book in 1086 as belonging to Henry de Ferrers and being worth ten shillings. It was later held by Dale Abbey.

After the dissolution of the monasteries, the manor passed to the Earl of Chesterfield, and later to the Every baronets.

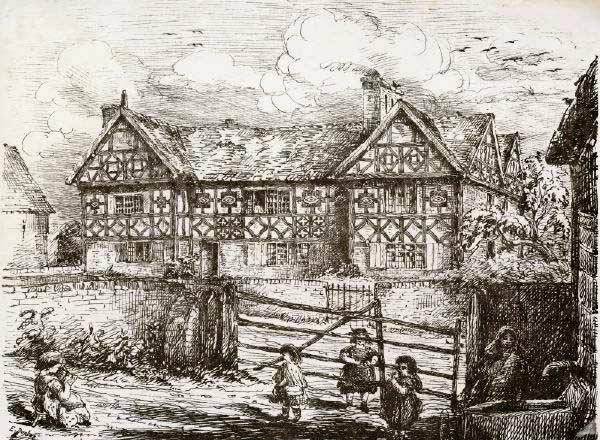
Wakelyn Hall in 1865

Wakelyn Hall is a Grade II listed half-timbered building dating back to the 16th century. Mary, Queen of Scots allegedly stopped at Wakelyn Hall briefly on her way to imprisonment at Tutbury Castle.

Other historic buildings include the Old Talbot Inn, the Wesleyan Chapel and Hilton Lodge.

Hilton was the birthplace of Herbert Massey who authorised the Great Escape. He was born at what is now Hilton House Hotel and is commemorated with a blue plaque on the wall of the hotel – it was supplied by the Hilton and Marston History Group.

== 20th Century ==
Although ancient, Hilton has undergone a great deal of development.

The new estate was created on the site of the former MoD depot by St. Modwen Properties;

1993 – Development agreement granted over 280-acre (1.1 km^{2}) MOD site.

2000 – Acquisition of MoD's remaining freehold interest.

2004 – Acquisition of water authorities former sewage works.

Many well-known house builders have contributed to the development including Redrow (which also included one of their Debut By Redrow developments aimed at first-time buyers and people starting over), McLean, Persimmon, Bryant and Wimpey.

In 2006 St Modwen built a warehouse for Daher on their industrial estate but this was destroyed by fire in early 2007. This has since been rebuilt.

== Modern-day Hilton ==
Hilton also has a small retail site. Adjacent to the retail site is an Aldi supermarket introduced in 2016 after years of speculation. Aldi first applied to build a store at Hilton in 2009. The plans were rejected, but new plans were submitted, with the results in September 2012. As of 29 November 2013, construction was completed and the store is now open. Consultation began in 2023 for a new, larger Aldi site at the edge of Hilton.

The Hilton House Hotel is a Georgian-built family home converted into a hotel in the 1960s. The hotel is licensed for civil weddings and has a sizeable function room, 10 bedrooms and public bar. As of July 2023, the hotel is still vacant after going into administration in February 2023. It has now been renovated to become the Hourglass Wine Bar.

== Sport ==
Hilton has a football club called Hilton Harriers AFC. It has 41 teams for the 2024/25 season. Over 500 children play for Hilton Harriers teams in the Burton and Derby Leagues. The Hilton Harriers First Team currently play in the Central Midlands Football League whilst their reserve side play in the Midlands Regional Alliance. Hilton also has other football teams including Hilton Athletic and AFC Hilton. Hilton Cricket Club run nine teams from Kwik Cricket upwards. Its junior section provides training and matches for some 150 young people. The four senior teams play in the Derbyshire County Cricket Leagues.

== Societies ==
As well as traditional clubs and societies such as the Women's Institute, Rotary Club, Scouts, Guides and Hilton Gardening Club, Hilton also has a thriving community of smaller special interest groups. There is a small local book club, Hilton Dog Walkers group and also a local history group. The Hilton Amateur Theatrical Society (H.A.T.S) has been performing pantomimes and other plays at the village hall for over twenty years. The village also recently took flight on the Internet thanks to the village community forum. This has so far helped to raise awareness of issues in the village such as poor broadband provisions and also the planned expansion of the village in future, as well as allowed residents to discuss issues more openly and across a broader audience.

== See also ==
- Listed buildings in Hilton, Derbyshire
