= Hedge Row Trench Cemetery =

CWGC cemetery in Ypres, Belgium

Hedge Row Trench
- Commonwealth War Graves Commission
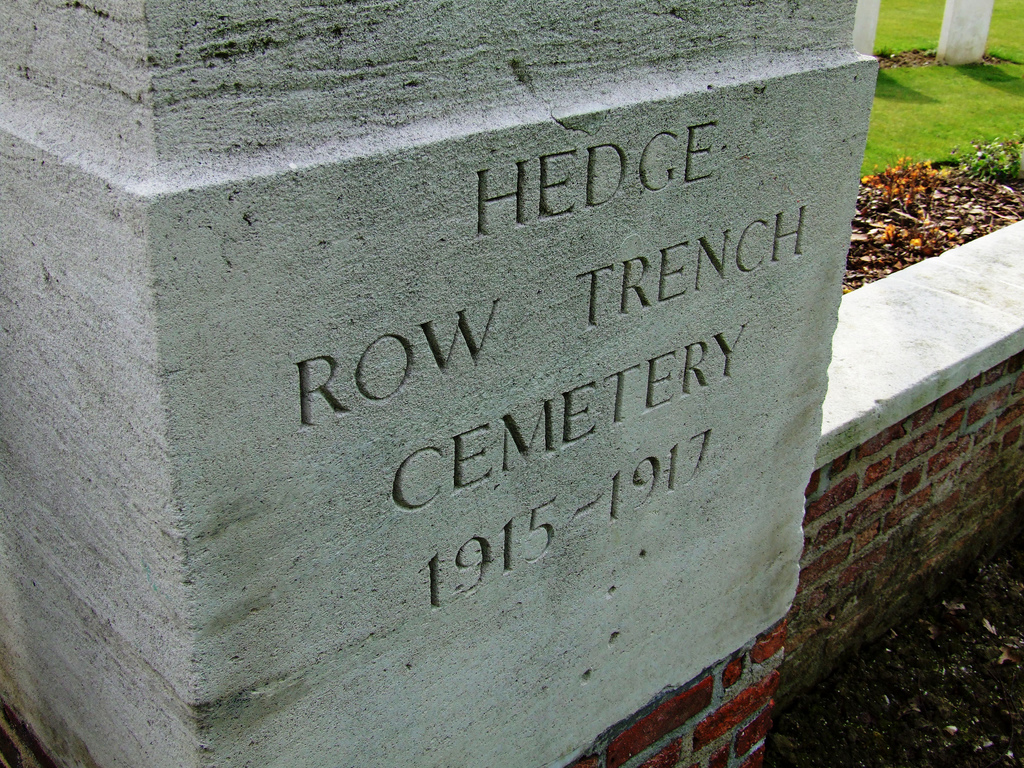
- Used for those deceased 1915–1917
- Established: March 1915
- Location: 50°49′11″N 02°54′49″E near Ypres, West Flanders, Belgium
- Designed by: J R Truelove
- Total burials: 98

Burials by nation
- Allies of World War I: United Kingdom: 96; Canada: 2

Burials by war
- World War I: 98

UNESCO World Heritage Site
- Official name: Funerary and memory sites of the First World War (Western Front)
- Type: Cultural
- Criteria: i, ii, vi
- Designated: 2023 (45th session)
- Reference no.: 1567-FL22

Hedge Row Trench Cemetery is a Commonwealth War Graves Commission burial ground for the dead of the First World War located near The Bluff south of Ypres (Ieper) in Belgium on the Western Front.

== Foundation ==
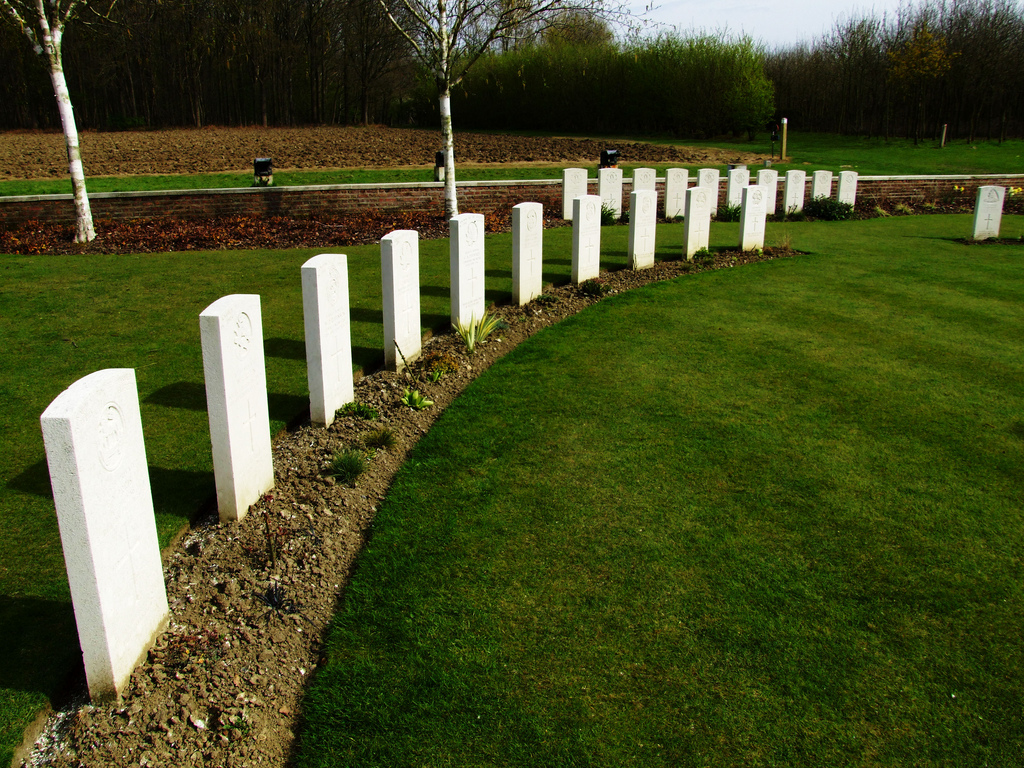
The cemetery grounds

The cemetery, also known as Ravine Wood Cemetery, was founded in March 1915 and closed in August 1917. Being directly on the front line, the cemetery was repeatedly shelled and the original locations of the graves could not be established. The majority of the stones are therefore arrayed in a circle around the Cross of Sacrifice and are marked "known to be buried in this cemetery", with the default additional phrase "Their glory shall not be blotted out", a line suggested by Rudyard Kipling.

The cemetery was designed by J R Truelove. The cemetery grounds were assigned to the United Kingdom in perpetuity by King Albert I of Belgium in recognition of the sacrifices made by the British Empire in the defence and liberation of Belgium during the war.

== Other cemeteries on "The Bluff" ==
- First DCLI Commonwealth War Graves Commission Cemetery, The Bluff
- Woods Commonwealth War Graves Commission Cemetery
