= RAF Ramleh =

Royal Air Force station in Ramla, Israel

RAF Ramleh
- Ramla, Central District in Israel

Site information
- Type: Royal Air Force station
- Operator: Royal Air Force

Location
- Shown within Israel
- Coordinates: 31°55′01″N 034°52′23″E

Site history
- Built: 1918
- In use: 1918 - 1947

Airfield information
Runways
Direction	Length and surface
00/00	Asphalt
00/00	Asphalt

Royal Air Force Ramleh or more simply RAF Ramleh is a former Royal Air Force station located in Ramla, Central District, Israel. It was originally in Mandatory Palestine.

== Units ==
- No. 6 Squadron RAF between 29 May and 19 November 1936 with the Hawker Hart & Hawker Demon and between 22 November 1937 and 17 February 1941 with the Hawker Hardy, Gloster Gauntlet, Westland Lysander I & II
- No. 11 Squadron RAF between 16 and 25 May 1941 with the Bristol Blenheim IV
- No. 33 Squadron RAF initially as a detachment between October 1935 and October 1938 with the Hart then between 21 October 1938 and 24 April 1939 with the Gladiator I
- No. 45 Squadron RAF as a detachment between October 1927 and August 1929 with the DH.9A
- No. 55 Squadron RAF as a detachment between February and July 1920 with the DH.9A
- No. 80 Squadron RAF as a detachment between May and September 1938 with the Gladiator I
- No. 111 Squadron RAF initially between 30 March and 18 October 1918 then 6 February 1919 and 1 February 1920 with the Royal Aircraft Factory S.E.5A, Nieuport 17, 23 & Nieuport 24 and the Bristol F.2B Fighter became No. 14 Squadron RAF between 1 February 1920 and 15 February 1926 with the Bristol F.2B Fighter & de Havilland DH.9A
- No. 113 Squadron RAF between 15 and 31 May 1941 with the Blenheim IV
- No. 142 Squadron RAF initially between 18 April and 18 September 1918 then between 4 October and 25 November 1918 with the Royal Aircraft Factory B.E.12A, Martinsyde G.102, Royal Aircraft Factory R.E.8, Armstrong Whitworth F.K.8 and Royal Aircraft Factory B.E.2E
- No. 145 Squadron RAF between 13 September and 20 October 1918 with the S.E.5.A
- No. 208 Squadron RAF as a detachment between February 1920 and September 1922, October 1927 and January 1938 and April 1936 and September 1938 with the R.E.8 and Bristol F.2B Fighter, Armstrong Whitworth Atlas, Hawker Audax and Demon
- No. 211 Squadron RAF between 18 July and 29 September 1938 with the Hawker Hind
- No. 651 Squadron RAF between February 1946 and June 1947 with the Taylorcraft Auster V
