= No. 6 Squadron RAF =

Flying squadron of the Royal Air Force

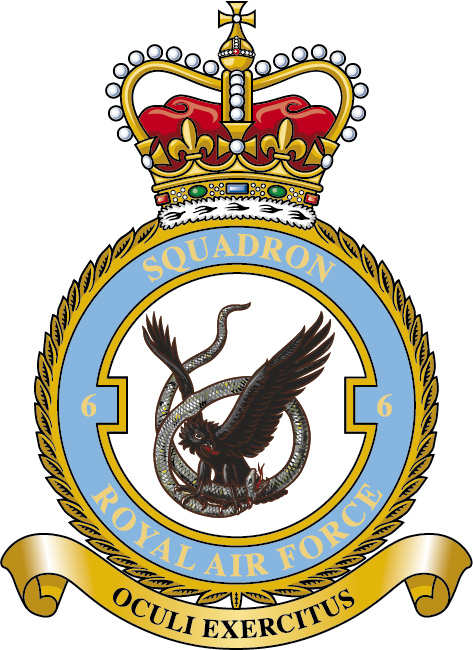
- Squadron badge
- Active: 1914–1918 (RFC); 1918–2007; 2010 – present
- Country: United Kingdom
- Branch: Royal Air Force
- Type: Flying squadron
- Role: Multi–role combat
- Part of: Combat Air Force
- Station: RAF Lossiemouth
- Nickname: 'The Flying Tin Openers'
- Mottos: Oculi Exercitus (Latin for 'The eyes of the army')
- Aircraft: Eurofighter Typhoon FGR4

Commanders
- Current commander: Wing Commander D Wild

Insignia
- Tail badge

- Roundel
- Tail codes: EA–EZ (Jaguar and Typhoon)

Number 6 Squadron of the Royal Air Force operates the Eurofighter Typhoon FGR.4 at RAF Lossiemouth. It was previously equipped with the SEPECAT Jaguar GR.3 in the close air support and tactical reconnaissance roles, and was posted to RAF Coltishall, Norfolk until April 2006, moving to RAF Coningsby until disbanding for the first time in its history on 31 May 2007. The squadron officially reformed as a Typhoon squadron on 6 September 2010. No. 6 Squadron is unique in having two Royal standards, having been awarded its second one by King Abdullah I of Jordan in October 1950 due to its long period of service in the Middle East.

== History ==
=== First World War ===
The squadron was formed on 31 January 1914, at Farnborough Aerodrome as No. 6 Squadron, Royal Flying Corps. Its first squadron commander was Major John Becke. The squadron had an initial aircraft inventory of two Royal Aircraft Factory B.E.2s and two Farmans, with the squadron also initially incorporating a flight operating man-lifting kites. The squadron, equipped with a mixture of B.E.2s, Royal Aircraft Factory B.E.8s and Farmans crossed the English Channel in October 1914 to support IV Corps in its attempt to prevent the Germans from capturing Antwerp. In November, the squadron joined the newly formed 2nd Wing of the RFC, with the role of supporting the Second and Third Corps, taking part in the First Battle of Ypres.

In February 1915, 9 Squadron, an experimental unit equipped with radio equipped aircraft, was split up, with one flight of aircraft going to 6 Squadron and the other to 2 Squadron. The new flight replaced 6 Squadron's existing C Flight, which together with flights from 2 Squadron and 5 Squadron, was used to form 16 Squadron. In March 1915, the squadron received two Martinsyde S.1 scouts, to escort the squadrons aircraft, and these were later supplemented by Bristol Scouts in the escort role, while the main part of the squadron used the B.E.2.

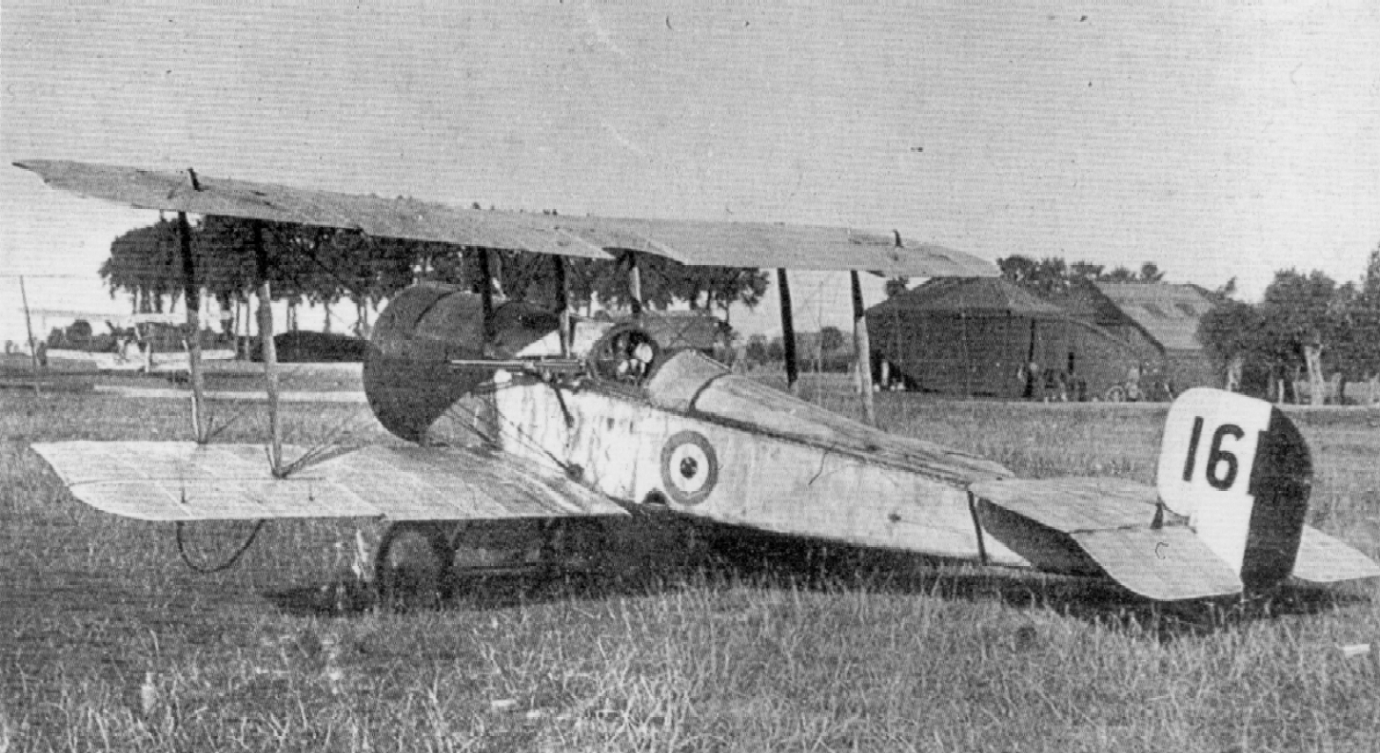
Bristol Scout C 1611, flown by Captain Lanoe Hawker on 25 July 1915 in his Victoria Cross-earning engagement

On 25 July 1915, Captain Lanoe Hawker, flying a Bristol Scout, attacked three German aircraft in succession. The first aerial victory for Hawker that day occurred after he emptied a complete drum of bullets from his aircraft's single Lewis machine gun into a German aircraft which went spinning down. The second victory saw a German aircraft driven to the ground damaged, and the third saw a German aircraft – an Albatros C.I of FFA 3 – burst into flames and crash. For this feat he was awarded the Victoria Cross.

The squadron was deployed directing artillery during the Actions of the Bluff near Ypres in February 1916 and the Actions of St Eloi Craters in March–April that year. During the Battle of the Somme from July to November 1916, the squadron carried out bombing attacks, including night bombing operations, against targets in the Ypres salient to prevent the Germans transferring troops to the Somme front. In May 1917, the squadron re-equipped with Royal Aircraft Factory R.E.8s. The squadron took part in the Battle of Messines in June 1917, artillery spotting during the preparatory bombardment, and then flying contact patrols. Later that year, the squadron took part in the Battle of Passchendaele, In September 1917, the squadron supported the British Second Army during the Battle of the Menin Road Ridge. In November 1917, the squadron was pulled out of the line and attached to V Corps, which was being held in reserve to exploit a potential breakthrough in the front, and was used to give training on cooperation between aircraft and ground forces to infantry, artillery and staff officers. As the squadron had posted away most of its observers, it was not drafted into action during the German spring offensive from March 1918, being sent to Le Crotoy to be out of the way of the offensive, while its commanding officer, Archibald James, was employed in finding airfields for the squadrons of the RFC (and RAF) as they were forced to relocate owing to the German advance.

While most of the squadron continued in its training duties, one flight was attached to the Cavalry Corps when the pressure from the German offensive died down, and in July 1918, the squadron reunited as an operational unit under the command of Major George Pirie in support of the Cavalry Corps. The squadron took part in the Battle of Amiens in August 1918, and the Battles of Bapaume and the Scarpe at the end of the month. The squadron continued to fly in support of the Cavalry Corps until the end of the war.

=== Inter-war years ===
Following the Armistice, the squadron was initially employed for communications and photographic duties in France, before being transferred to Iraq, arriving in July 1919, continuing to operate the R.E.8. Operating in the army co-operation role, the squadron received Bristol Fighters in July 1920, which it used against the Iraqi Revolt that broke out that year, bombing rebel forces. In 1924, the squadron was part of a large force of aircraft deployed against Kudish revolts led by Mahmud Barzanji, bombing the city of Sulaymaniyah. On 14 September 1924, 6 Squadron Bristol Fighters attacked two Turkish cavalry columns that had crossed into Iraq, dispersing the columns. In 1925, the squadron carried out further operations against forces led by Mahmud. In 1927, the squadron supported operations against Ahmed Barzani which resulted in the occupation of Barzan by Iraqi Levies, and the retreat of Ahmed Barzani to the hills.

Across the numerous occasions when 6 Squadron was stationed in Iraq, a total of twenty-five No. 6 Squadron men lost their lives and were buried in Iraq. Five of these men were buried in the Baghdad (North Gate) War Cemetery during 1920 and 1921 when the squadron was based at Baghdad West and three men were buried at the Habbaniya War Cemetery between 1952 and 1955 when 6 Squadron was based at RAF Habbaniya. The remaining 17 men died between May 1922 and July 1928 when the squadron was based at RAF Hinaidi, located in the southern suburbs of Baghdad, and they were all buried at the Hinaidi RAF (Peace) Cemetery on land that is still owned by the British Ministry of Defence. The name of the cemetery was later changed to the Ma'Asker Al Raschid RAF Cemetery and the site was initially maintained by the Imperial War Graves Commission and later the Commonwealth War Graves Commission, though the cemetery fell into neglect in the mid-1960s.

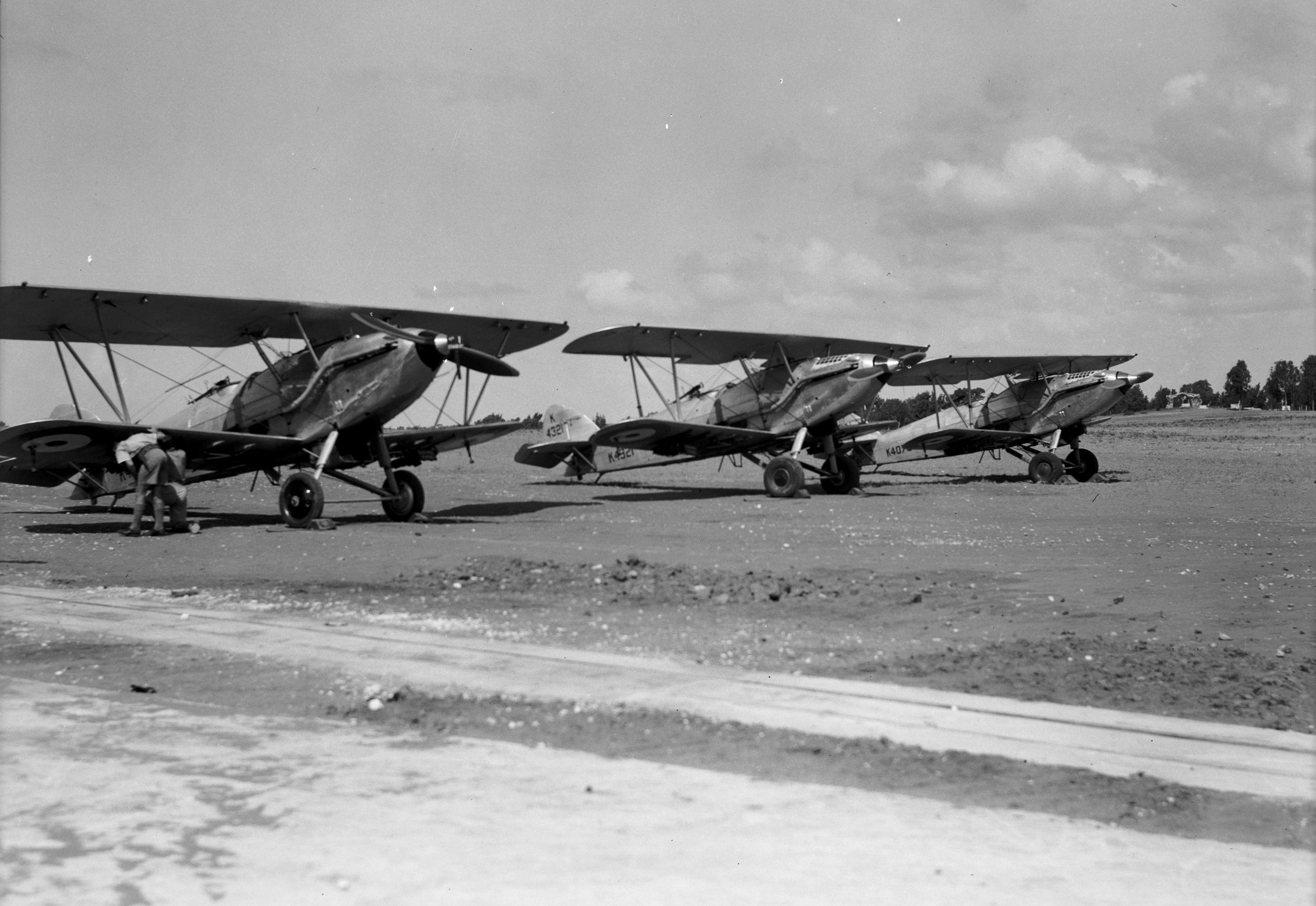
Hawker Hardy aircraft operating from RAF Ramleh airfield in the 1930s

In October 1929, 6 Squadron moved to RAF Ismailia in Egypt, with a detachment at RAF Ramleh, Mandatory Palestine. In April 1931, the squadron's role was re-assigned to that of a bomber squadron, while from June that year, it started to receive more modern Fairey Gordons, with the last Bristol Fighters being withdrawn by June 1932. In October 1935, the squadron reequipped with Hawker Hart bombers, with an additional flight receiving Hawker Demons (a fighter version of the Hart), and the squadron's Gordons being transferred to 14 and 47 Squadrons. The Demons were not kept for long, being transferred to 29 Squadron in January 1936. The outbreak of the 1936–1939 Arab revolt in Palestine in 1936 saw the whole of the squadron move to Ramleh, carrying out operations ranging from dropping leaflets and escorting trains and road convoys to bombing and strafing hostile forces. The main body of the squadron returned to Egypt in November 1936, with fighting in Palestine reducing. A resurgence of violence in Palestine saw the squadron return to Ramleh in November 1937, From January 1938, the squadron's Harts were replaced by Hawker Hardys (another, General Purpose, variant of the Hart), with the squadron continuing to be heavily deployed against the revolt through the rest of 1938 and well into 1939.

=== Second World War ===
The squadron added Gloster Gauntlet fighters and Westland Lysander army cooperation aircraft to its Hardys in August and September 1939 respectively, but the declaration of war against Germany on 3 September 1939 had little effect on the squadron at first, with internal security duties in Palestine remaining the squadron's priority. At the end of February 1940, the squadron was redesignated an army co-operation squadron. Hostilities with Italy broke out in June 1940, and in September 1940, the squadron deployed one flight of Lysanders to Egypt to work with the army, with the remainder of the squadron remained in Palestine. In February 1941, the whole squadron transferred to North Africa, moving to Barca in Libya, with a flight forward deployed at Agedabia The Lysander was unsuitable for operations when faced by modern fighters, and one flight was reequipped with Hawker Hurricanes at the start of March 1941.

When Operation Sonnenblume the Axis offensive in Libya the spring of 1941 caused the Allied forces to withdraw, the flights of 6 Squadron were forced to make a number of moves to avoid being overrun, and when Tobruk was besieged the squadron ended up inside the perimeter, carrying out tactical reconnaissance. The squadron suffered from spares shortages, while the airfield was subject to German shelling, and the squadron's aircraft were vulnerable to attack by German fighters when landing. Two of the squadron's three flights were ordered to evacuate in 19 April, while the remaining flight left Tobruk on 10 May. In June 1941, the squadron was equipped completely with Hurricanes, discarding its remaining Lysanders. At the end of June, the squadron was transferred to Tel Aviv for a rest.

In August 1941, the squadron, now equipped with Lysanders and Gloster Gladiator fighters, moved to Wadi Halfa in Sudan, with a detachment at Kufra in south-west Libya. On 26 September 1941, one of the Gladiators from Kufra intercepted an Italian Savoia-Marchetti SM.79, claiming it as possibly damaged. This was the last combat engagement by an RAF-flown Gladiator. A few Hurricanes were added in September 1941, and four Bristol Blenheims added in November that year. The squadron was withdrawn from operations again early in 1942, and carried out maintenance tasks until its next equipment arrived.

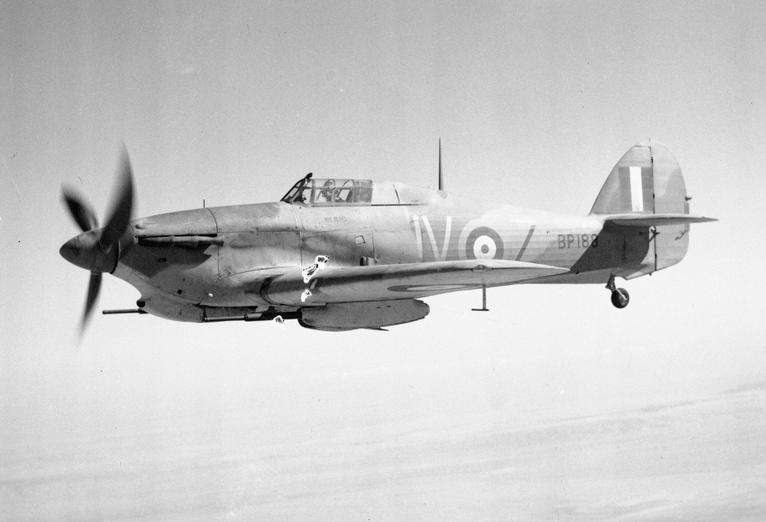
A No. 6 Squadron Hawker Hurricane Mk.IID over the Western Desert during 1942

In April 1942, the squadron moved to RAF Shandur to re-equip with the Hurricane Mk. IID, a specialist ground-attack version armed with two Vickers S 40 mm guns, designed for anti-armour operations. The squadron moved up to RAF Gambut on 4 June 1942 for operations, flying its first, unsuccessful combat operation with the Hurricane II.Ds on 7 June, while on 8 June it claimed one tank destroyed and several other vehicles damaged, at a cost of two Hurricanes shot down by anti-aircraft fire and another damaged. As the Hurricane IID was slow and relatively vulnerable to enemy attack, it was employed under tight conditions - requiring fighter escort and targets whose position was known, could be easily identified from the air and not protected by too much anti-aircraft fire were attacked - this allowed the aircraft to operate effectively while minimising casualties. The squadron took part in the Second Battle of El Alamein in October–November 1942, but in December, the squadron was temporarily withdrawn from its anti-armour role to fly shipping protection duties with Hurricane IICs.

The squadron returned to the anti-tank role on 22 February 1943, again equipped with the Hurricane IID. In March 1943, the squadron took part in the Battle of the Mareth Line. The squadron's attacks were effective, but losses were heavy. Fifteen Hurricanes from 6 Squadron were shot down between 22 and 26 March, with six shot down near El Hamma on 25 March. The vulnerability of the unarmoured Hurricane IID to ground fire when carrying out gun attacks led to 3-inch rockets being preferred and the squadron was withdrawn after the end of the fighting in North Africa until it could receive new equipment, which arrived in July 1943 as the Hurricane IV, which could be armed with rocket projectiles.

In February 1944, the squadron moved with its Hurricane Mk IVs to Grottaglie airfield, near Taranto, Italy. Moored Axis ships were attacked at Yugoslav harbours and the Dalmatian islands. They were strongly defended by anti-aircraft gunners on Siebel ferries, as the ships were being used to supply the German forces. Squadron detachments were also made to Bastia in Corsica, Araxos near Patras in Greece, Brindisi, and near Ancona. A fixed 44-gallon extra petrol tank under the port wing increased the Hurricanes' duration to almost three hours at 160 mph (260 km/h) cruising speed. The airfield on Vis was extensively used as an advanced base from May 1944 to February 1945, usually to top up tanks before each armed reconnaissance.

=== Post-Second World War/Cold War ===
In July 1945, the squadron returned to Palestine, as British forces faced an insurgency by Zionist forces, with duties including patrolling oil pipelines to deter sabotage attacks. The squadron was the last RAF combat unit to operate Hurricanes, and for a brief period four Spitfires due to a lack of Hurricanes. In October 1946, the squadron moved to RAF Nicosia in Cyprus, and in December that year, converted to Hawker Tempest Mk VIs. In September 1947, the squadron moved to RAF Shallufa in Egypt, and in November that year to Khartoum in Sudan, with detachments at Mogadishu in Somalia. In May 1948, the squadron moved to RAF Fayid in Egypt in order to cover the British withdrawal from Palestine. In August 1948, the squadron moved to RAF Deversoir, near Ismailia, Egypt. On 6 January 1949, as Israeli forces advanced into the Sinai Peninsula during the Arab–Israeli War, four Spitfires 208 Squadron were ordered to carry out a reconnaissance near the Israel–Egypt border, and all four were lost, one to Israeli ground fire and three shot down by Israeli Spitfires. After the four British Spitfires failed to return to base, four more 208 Squadron Spitfires were sent on a search mission for the missing aircraft, with eight Tempests from 6 Squadron and a further seven from 213 Squadron escorting the Spitfires. Four Israeli Spitfire IXs, attacked the British aircraft, and when they attempted to respond, it was found that 213 Squadron's aircraft's guns would not fire, while 6 Squadron's aircraft could not release their drop tanks. One 213 Squadron Tempest was shot down, with two more 213 Squadron and one six Squadron aircraft damaged.

In October 1949 it received de Havilland Vampire FB.5s. In January 1950, the squadron moved to RAF Habbaniya in Iraq with many moves back and forth between RAF Habbaniya and RAF Shaibah in Iraq, RAF Abu Sueir and RAF Deversoir in the Suez Canal Zone, RAF Nicosia in Cyprus, RAF Mafraq and RAF Amman in the Hashemite Kingdom of Jordan and detachments throughout the Middle East. While visiting Amman on 15 October 1950, No. 6 Squadron was awarded a Royal Standard by King Abdullah I of Jordan in recognition of the squadron's service in the Middle East since 1919. In February 1952 the squadron received Vampire FB.9s. In September 1952, three of the squadron's Vampires were deployed to Sharjah in response to the Buraimi dispute, when Saudi forces had occupied a village near Al-Buraimi in Oman. The aircraft flew low-level demonstration flights over villages in the region, and after a diplomatic agreement in October, returned to Habbaniya. A further increase in tension early in 1953 caused a larger detachment to be sent to Sharjah, which was later relieved by a detachment of Gloster Meteors from 208 Squadron. The squadron re-equipped with de Havilland Venom FB.1 at Amman in February 1954, the first RAF squadron outside Germany to receive the Venom. In June 1955, it was the first squadron to receive the improved Venom FB.4, and in August that year, four of the new aircraft were deployed on Operation Quick Return, a 10,000 mi (16,000 km) round trip to Cape Town in South Africa, which took 14 days, with 13 airfields visited.

On 6 April 1956, the squadron returned to Cyprus, operating from RAF Akrotiri. In November 1956, the squadron took part in the Suez Crisis, carrying out attacks from Akrotiri against Egyptian airfields from 1 November, losing a single Venom. The requirement to support the nations of the Baghdad Pact against potential aggression meant that the RAF's Cyprus-based Venoms had inadequate range, and it was decided to re-equip them with the English Electric Canberra B.2, which had been replaced by newer aircraft in RAF Bomber Command. A detachment was sent to RAF Coningsby to equip with the new aircraft, while much of the squadron's fighter-trained aircrew were posted away. The squadron's two Canberra-equipped flights returned to Akrotiri on 15 July and 1 August 1957 respectively. The squadron replaced its Canberra B.2s with Canberra B.6s (also ex-Bomber Command) in December 1959. In July 1961, when Iraqi threats to invade resulted in British forces being deployed to Kuwait, 6 Squadron was held at readiness to reinforce the forces in the Gulf if required. In January 1962, it received Canberra B.16s, equipped with improved navigational equipment and hardpoints under the wings for bombs and rockets, and also capable of delivering nuclear bombs by Toss bombing, with nuclear strike using the Red Beard nuclear bomb added to the squadron's duties. In August–September 1965, the squadron was temporarily deployed to RAF Labuan in Malaysia as one of a series of deployments to reinforce the Far East Air Force during the Indonesia–Malaysia confrontation. It continued to operate the Canberra from Akrotiri until 13 January 1969 when the squadron disbanded.

Having been located outside of the UK for 50 years, the squadron returned in 1969 and was the first to receive the Phantom FGR.2 at RAF Coningsby the same year, before re-equipping with the Jaguar GR.1 and T.2 at RAF Lossiemouth in 1974. The squadron then moved to RAF Coltishall, being declared operational in the tactical nuclear role with twelve aircraft and eight WE.177 nuclear bombs until 1994, when the squadron's nuclear role was terminated and the weapons withdrawn.

=== Post-Cold War ===
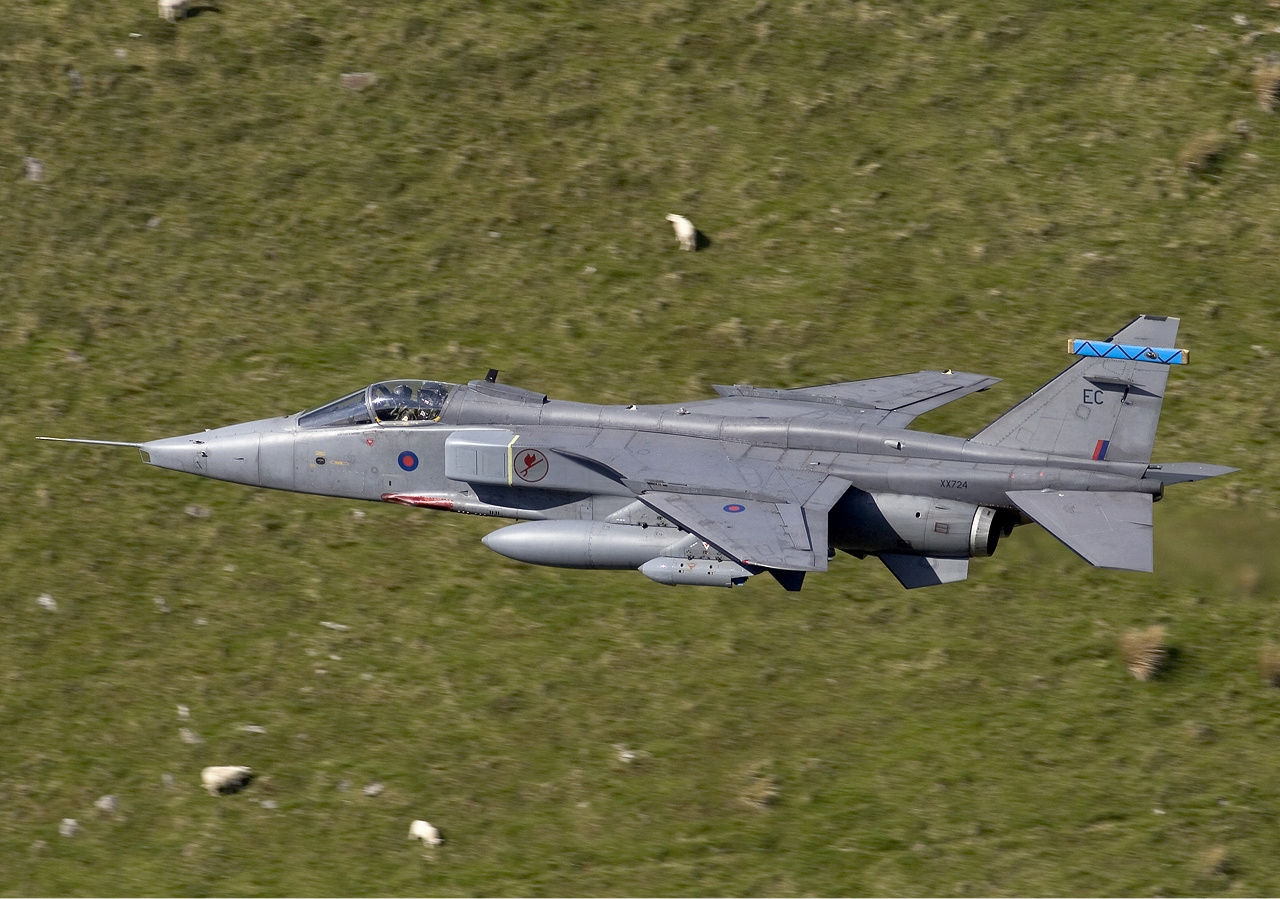
A No. 6 Squadron SEPECAT Jaguar GR3A in 2006

The squadron's aircraft were deployed to the Gulf as part of Operation Granby (Gulf War), for which it received battle honours, and later as part of the Northern No-Fly-Zone. The squadron deployed to Gioia del Colle Air Base in Italy for operations over Bosnia as part of Operation Deny Flight from April 1993. The squadron continued at RAF Coltishall in its non-nuclear role until Coltishall closed on 1 April 2006, and the squadron moved to RAF Coningsby.

The squadron was the last to fly the SEPECAT Jaguar, and was disbanded on 31 May 2007. The Jaguar's intended replacement in RAF service was the Eurofighter Typhoon. The RAF announced that No. 6 Squadron was to be the fourth operational front-line squadron equipped with the Typhoon and the first with Tranche 2 aircraft, initially scheduled to reform in 2008 at RAF Leuchars in Fife. However, this was delayed until 2010, with the squadron reforming at RAF Leuchars on 6 September 2010, when a closed standing-up ceremony was performed to mark the squadron's reforming, including the arrival of the new Typhoon aircraft in 6 Squadron colours from RAF Coningsby.

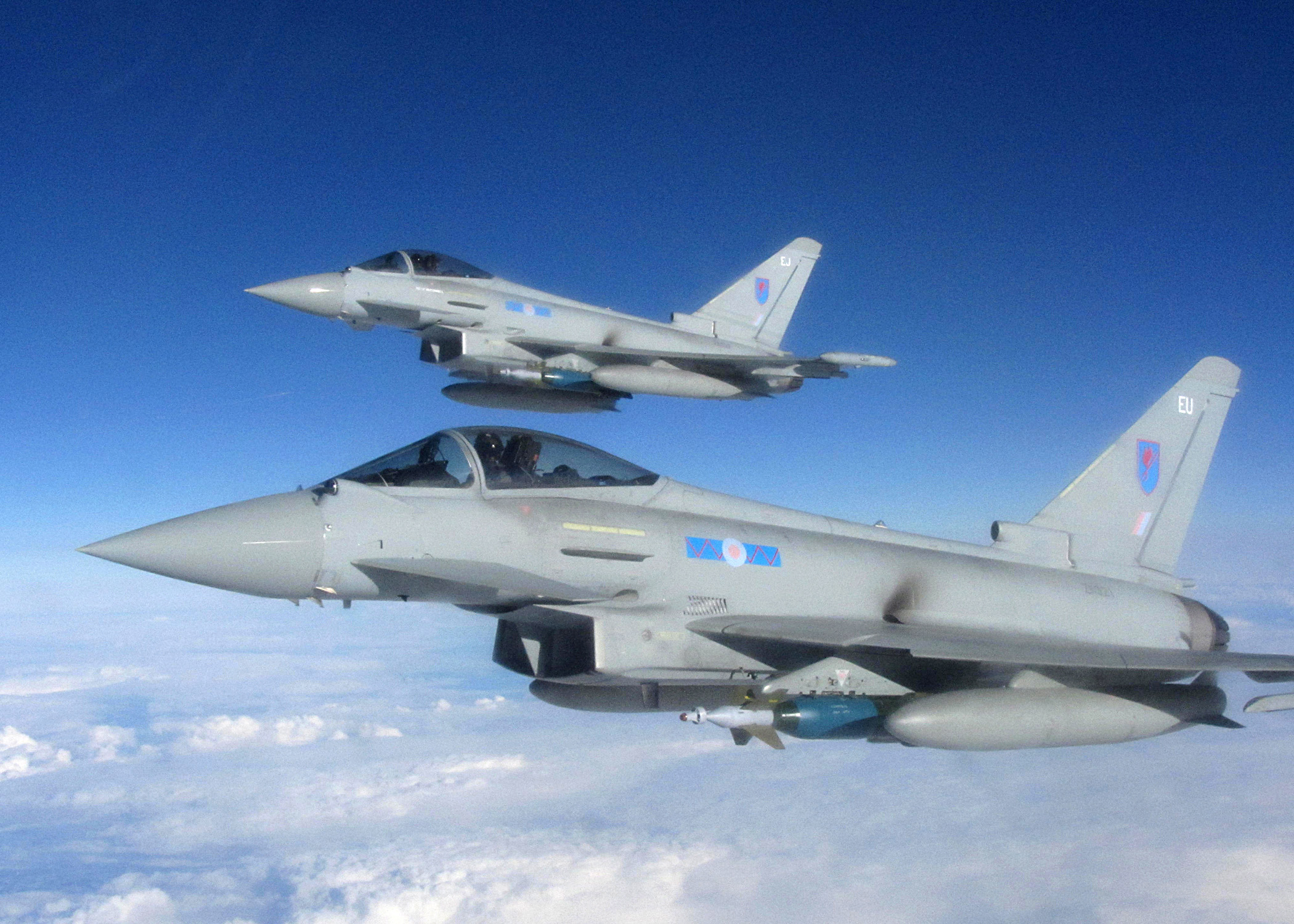
Two Eurofighter Typhoon FGR4 of No. 6 Squadron, with squadron specific codes "EJ" and "EU", March 2013

The squadron has taken over the role of Quick Reaction Alert for the north of the United Kingdom from No. 111 Squadron RAF, the RAF's last Panavia Tornado F.3 squadron, in March 2011. In November 2011 four Typhoons from No. 6 Squadron flew to RMAF Butterworth to participate in aerial war games for the 40th anniversary of the Five Power Defence Arrangements. In August 2013, several Typhoons from No. 6 were exercising with HMS Dragon and US fighters in the Gulf. In June 2014, the squadron began to move to its new home in RAF Lossiemouth.

The squadron participated in the 2018 missile strikes against Syria during the Syrian Civil War.

In March 2020, the squadron was awarded the right to emblazon a battle honour on its squadron standard, recognising its role in Bosnia during 1995.

The squadron attended Exercise Spears of Victory 23 during February 2023 at King Abdulaziz Air Base.

== Aircraft operated ==
Aircraft operated included:

- Farman MF.7 "Long Horn" and MF.11 "Short Horn" (1914)
- Royal Aircraft Factory B.E.2 variants (1914)
- Royal Aircraft Factory R.E.8 (1918)
- Bristol Scout (1915)
- Bristol F2B "Brisfit" (to 1931)
- Fairey Gordon
- Gloster Gauntlet
- Hawker Hart (1935)
- Hawker Demon (1935)
- Hawker Hardy (1938)
- Westland Lysander
- Gloster Gladiator
- Hawker Hurricane (1941)
- Hawker Hurricane IID — Famous "Tankbusting" variant (1942–1944)
- Hawker Hurricane IV — Ground Attack variant (1944–1946)
- Bristol Blenheim
- Supermarine Spitfire (1946)
- Hawker Tempest (1946–1949)
- de Havilland Vampire (1949)
- de Havilland Venom FB.4
- English Electric Canberra B.2, B.15, B.16 (1957–1969)
- McDonnell Douglas F-4M Phantom FGR.2 (1969–1974)
- SEPECAT Jaguar GR.3 (1974–2007)
- Eurofighter Typhoon FGR.4 (2007–present)

== Heritage and markings ==
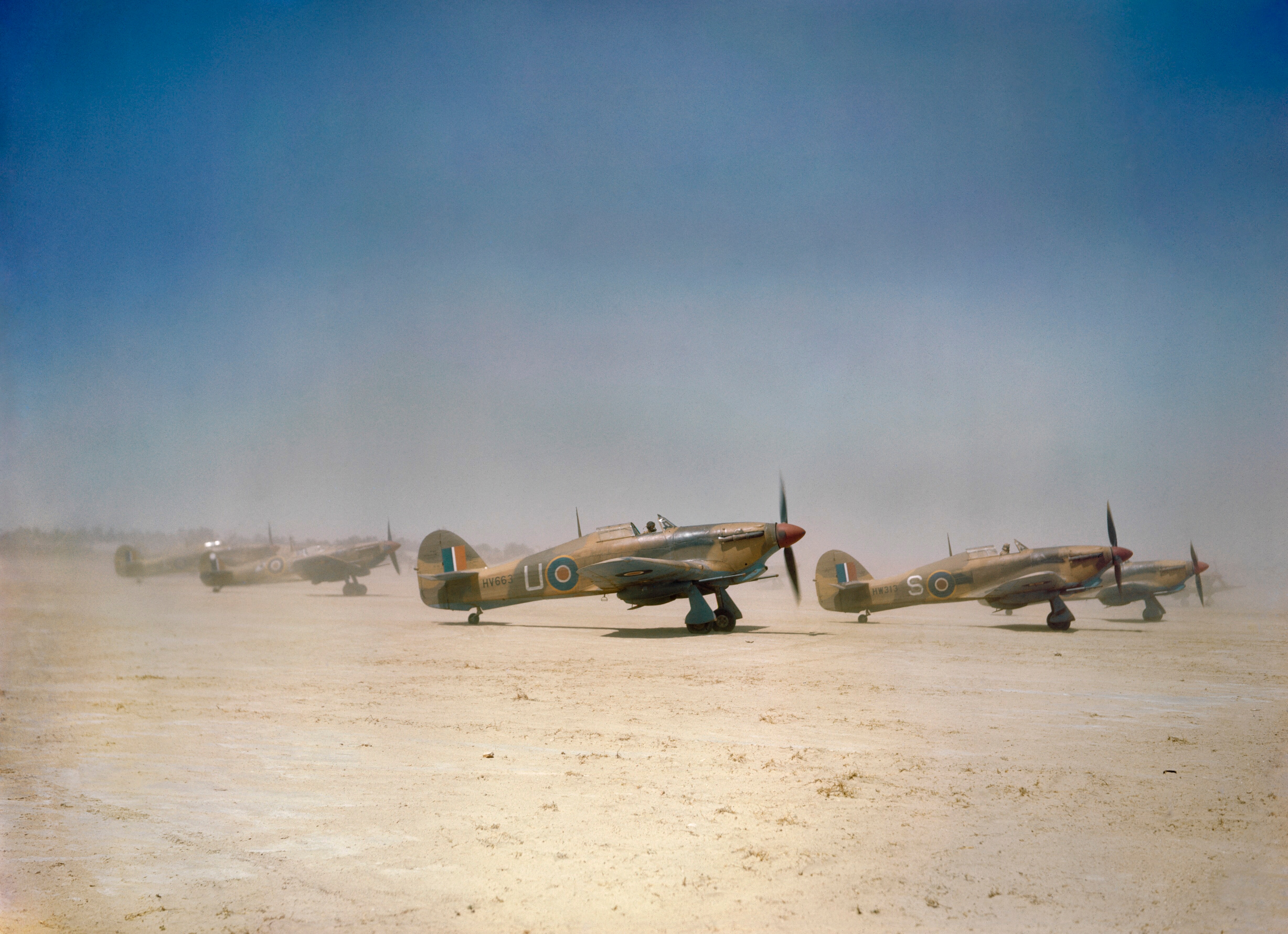
Several Hawker Hurricane Mk.IID of No. 6 Squadron departing Gabès Airfield in Tunisia for a tank-busting raid on 6 April 1943

=== Badge and motto ===
No. 6 Squadron's badge features an eagle, wings elevated, preying on a serpent. The badge was approved by King George VI in January 1938. An earlier unauthorised badge featured an eagle sitting within a figure 6.

The squadron's motto is Oculi Exercitus (Latin for 'The eyes of the army').

=== Markings ===
During the First World War, the squadron was allocated markings of three fuselage bands, which were black on clear doped fabric aircraft and white on dark painted machines, one each side of the aircraft's roundel and one on the rear fuselage just forward of the tailplane. These were carried from 1916 to March 1918. The squadron's operations in cooperation with the Royal Artillery during the First World War gave rise to the "Gunner's Stripe" used as a marking on the squadron's aircraft, consisting of a pale blue stripe with a superimposed red zig-zag, carried on either side of the fuselage roundel or on the tail.

=== Nickname ===
The squadron's nickname 'The Flying Tin Openers' originated during the North African campaign of the Second World War when the squadron operated the Hurricane Mk.IID and were known for carrying out low level attacks against German and Italian armoured vehicles and tanks. The nickname is reflected in the squadron's aircraft tail badge which features a tin opener.

=== Call signs ===
As of March 2025, aircraft operated by No. 6 Squadron use the following peacetime air traffic control call signs within UK airspace: Boxer, Cannon, Colt, Dread, Flak, Nasty, Panzer, Phantom, Ruin, Shocker, Tankbuster, Tempest, Turbo and Venom.

== Battle honours ==
No. 6 Squadron has received the following battle honours. Those marked with an asterisk (*) may be emblazoned on the squadron standard.

- Western Front (1914–1918)*
- Neuve Chappelle (1915)*
- Ypres (1915)*
- Loos (1915)*
- Somme (1916)*
- Ypres (1917)
- Amiens (1918)
- Hindenburg Line (1918)*
- Iraq (1919–1920)
- Kurdistan (1922–1924)
- Palestine (1936–1939)
- Egypt and Libya (1940–1943)*
- El Alamein (1942)*
- El Hamma (1940-43)*
- Italy (1944–1945)*
- South-East Europe (1944–1945)
- Gulf (1991)
- Bosnia (1995)

== Commanding officers ==
List of commanding officers
From	To	Name
January 1914	March 1915	Major John Becke
March 1915	December 1915	Major Gordon Shephard
December 1915	September 1916	Major Reginald Mills MC AFC
September 1916	June 1917	Major Arthur Barratt MC
June 1917	July 1918	Major Archibald James MC
July 1918	February 1920	Major George Pirie MC
13 February 1920	31 March 1920	S/Ldr W Sowrey
May 1920	April 1922	S/Ldr E A B Rice
April 1922	January 1924	S/Ldr Edye Rolleston Manning DSO MC
January 1924	November 1925	S/Ldr D S K Crosbie OBE
November 1925	November 1926	S/Ldr D F Stevenson DSO, MC
November 1926	January 1928	S/Ldr Cyril Lowe MC DFC
January 1928	February 1930	S/Ldr Claude Hilton Keith
February 1930	February 1931	S/Ldr C R Cox AFC
February 1934	January 1937	S/Ldr Herbert Massey DSO, MC
February 1940	September 1940	S/Ldr William Neil McKechnie
September 1940	April 1941	S/Ldr E R Weld
April 1941	February 1942	S/Ldr P Legge
February 1942	January 1943	W/Cdr R C Porteous DSO
January 1943	May 1943	S/Ldr D Weston-Burt DSO
May 1943	May 1944	W/Cdr A E Morrison-Bell DFC
May 1944	August 1944	S/Ldr J H Brown DSO, DFC
August 1944	November 1944	S/Ldr R H Langdon-Davies DFC
November 1944	July 1946	S/Ldr R Slade-Betts, DFC
August 1946	December 1946	S/Ldr C E Mould
December 1946	November 1947	S/Ldr C K Gray, DFC
November 1947	July 1950	S/Ldr Denis Crowley-Milling, DSO DFC & Bar
July 1950	November 1952	S/Ldr P A Kennedy DSO, DFC, AFC
November 1952	October 1954	S/Ldr E J Roberts
October 1954	November 1956	S/Ldr P C Ellis DFC
November 1956	July 1957	S/Ldr G P Elliott
May 1969	August 1970	W/Cdr David Harcourt-Smith
August 1970	December 1972	W/Cdr J E Nevill
December 1972	June 1974	W/Cdr B W Lavender
June 1974	Jul 1975	W/Cdr R J Quarterman
Jul 1975	Dec 1977	Wg Cdr N R Hayward
Dec 1977	Mar 1980	Wg Cdr G B Robertson
Mar 1980	Aug 1982	Wg Cdr M N Evans
Aug 1982	Dec 1984	Wg Cdr D W Bramley
Dec 1984	Jun 1987	Wg Cdr N A Buckland
Jun 1987	Dec 1989	Wg Cdr I Reilly
Dec 1989	Feb 1992	Wg Cdr (later Gp Capt) J Connolly AFC
Feb 1992	Jul 1994	Wg Cdr A D Sweetman
Jul 1994	Dec 1996	Wg Cdr I A Milne
Dec 1996	Jul 1999	Wg Cdr M J Roche
Jul 1999	Jul 2002	Wg Cdr R W Judson
Jul 2002	Jul 2004	Wg Cdr M J Seares MBE
Jul 2004	Apr 2006	Wg Cdr W A Cruickshank
Apr 2006	May 2007	Wg Cdr J M Sullivan
Sep 2010	Oct 2012	Wg Cdr R Dennis OBE
Oct 2012	Aug 2014	Wg Cdr M R Baulkwill
Aug 2014	Nov 2016	Wg Cdr J R E Walls DSO
Nov 2016	May 2019	Wg Cdr W D Cooper
May 2019	Sep 2021	Wg Cdr M D'Aubyn
Sep 2021	Sep 2023	Wg Cdr N J Rees OBE
Sep 2023	Sep 2025	Wg Cdr G Montgomery MBE
Sep 2025	Present	Wg Cdr D Wild

== See also ==
- List of Royal Air Force aircraft squadrons
- Armed forces in Scotland
- Military history of Scotland
