= Woods Cemetery =

WWI CWGC cemetery in Ypres, Belgium

Woods
- Commonwealth War Graves Commission
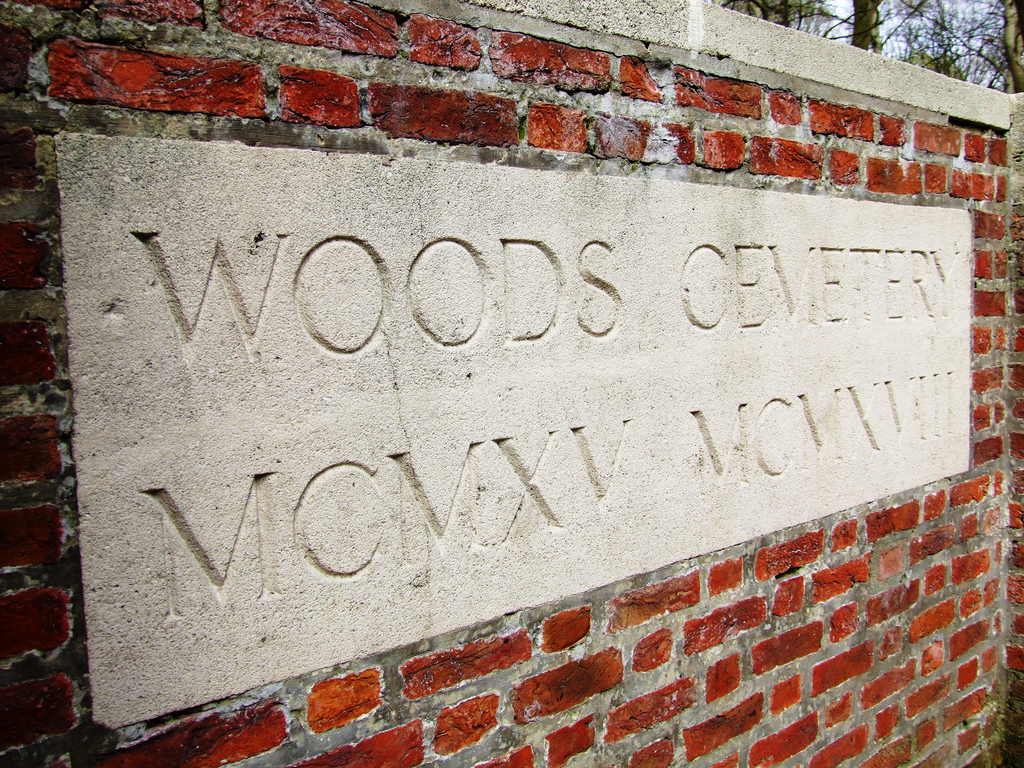
- Used for those deceased 1915–1918
- Established: April 1915
- Location: 50°49′21″N 02°54′55″E near Ypres, West Flanders, Belgium
- Designed by: Sir Edwin Lutyens
- Total burials: 326

Burials by nation
- Allies of World War I: United Kingdom: 202; Canada: 111; Australia: 3

Burials by war
- World War I: 326

UNESCO World Heritage Site
- Official name: Funerary and memory sites of the First World War (Western Front)
- Type: Cultural
- Criteria: i, ii, vi
- Designated: 2023 (45th session)
- Reference no.: 1567-FL20

Woods Cemetery is a Commonwealth War Graves Commission burial ground for the dead of the First World War located near The Bluff south of Ypres (Ieper) in Belgium on the Western Front.

== Foundation ==
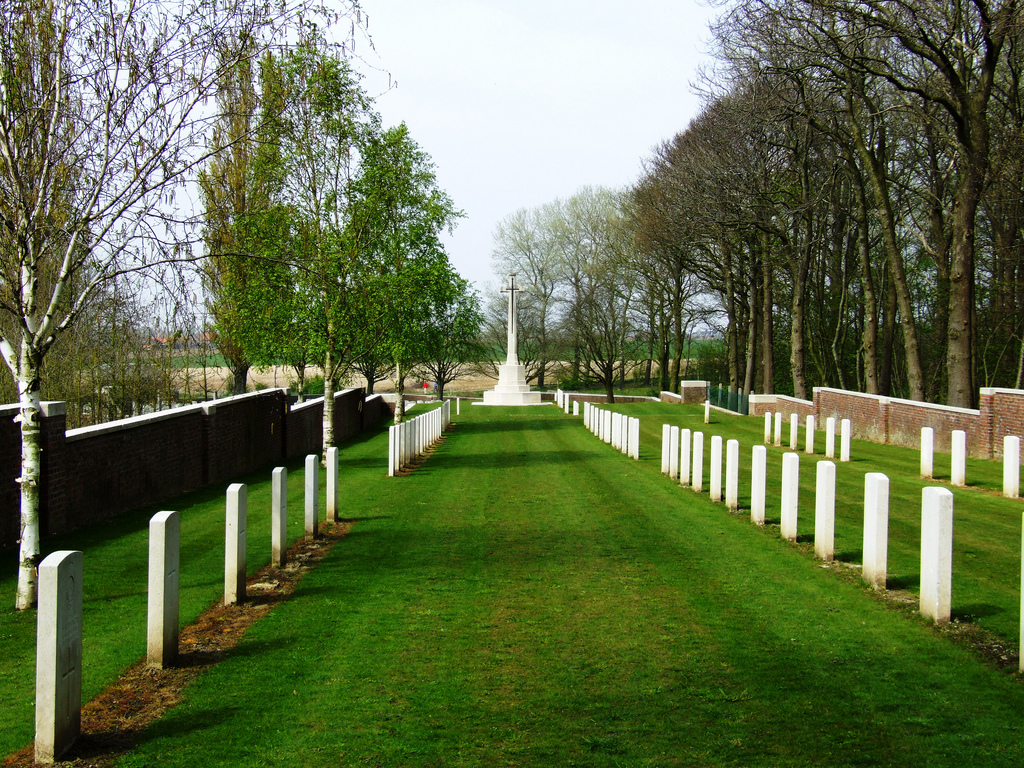
The Cross of Sacrifice or War Cross

The cemetery was made by the 1st Battalions of the Dorset and East Surrey Regiments in April 1915. It closed in September 1917. Many of the burials are from the London Regiment and the Canadian 2nd, 3rd and 10th Divisions. For much of the war, the front line ran just beyond the trees the cemetery is named for.

The cemetery was designed by Sir Edwin Lutyens. The cemetery grounds were assigned to the United Kingdom in perpetuity by King Albert I of Belgium in recognition of the sacrifices made by the British Empire in the defence and liberation of Belgium during the war.

== Other cemeteries on "The Bluff" ==
- First DCLI Commonwealth War Graves Commission Cemetery, The Bluff
- Hedge Row Trench Commonwealth War Graves Commission Cemetery
