= Herbert Massey =

RAF officer

Air Commodore Herbert Massey CBE DSO MC
- Born: 19 January 1898; Hilton, Derbyshire, England
- Died: 29 February 1976 (aged 78); Barnstaple, Devon, England
- Military career
- Allegiance: United Kingdom
- Branch: British Army (1915–18); Royal Air Force (1918–50)
- Service years: 1915–1950
- Rank: Air Commodore
- Commands: RAF Oakington (1942); RAF Abingdon (1940–42); No. 6 Squadron (1934–37)
- Conflicts: First World War; Arab Revolt in Palestine; Second World War
- Awards: Commander of the Order of the British Empire; Distinguished Service Order; Military Cross; Mentioned in Despatches (3)

Air Commodore Herbert Martin Massey, CBE, DSO, MC (19 January 1898 – 29 February 1976) was a senior officer in the Royal Air Force. He was the Senior British Officer at Stalag Luft III who authorised the "Great Escape".

== Flying career ==
Massey entered the Royal Military College, Sandhurst in 1915, and was commissioned as a second lieutenant into the Nottinghamshire and Derbyshire Regiment in April 1916. He soon after underwent flying training, and was posted as a pilot to No. 16 Squadron of the Royal Flying Corps from July. He was promoted temporary captain and made a flight commander in December 1916. On 4 February 1917, Massey was wounded and his observer killed when their aircraft was shot down by German ace Werner Voss.

Transferring to the newly created Royal Air Force in 1918, Massey continued his military career through the interwar period. He commanded No. 6 Squadron in operations during the Arab Revolt in Palestine, for which he was awarded the Distinguished Service Order, and was a station commander during the early years of the Second World War. He was officer commanding of No. 10 Operational Training Unit with temporary rank of group captain made permanent in 1942.

He was on a Short Stirling of No. 7 Squadron RAF during the second Thousand-bomber raid when it was shot down near the Dutch coast during a raid in night of 1/2 June 1942, and was captured by the Germans. Massey then became the Senior British Officer at Stalag Luft III, and authorised the "Great Escape" in March 1943. Massey had suffered severe wounds to the same leg in both wars and walked with a limp. There would be no escape for him but as Senior British Officer, he had to know what was going on. Massey had been a veteran escaper himself and had been in trouble with the Gestapo. His experience allowed him to offer sound advice to the X-Organisation.

Due to ill-health he was repatriated to the UK in 1944.

== Legacy ==
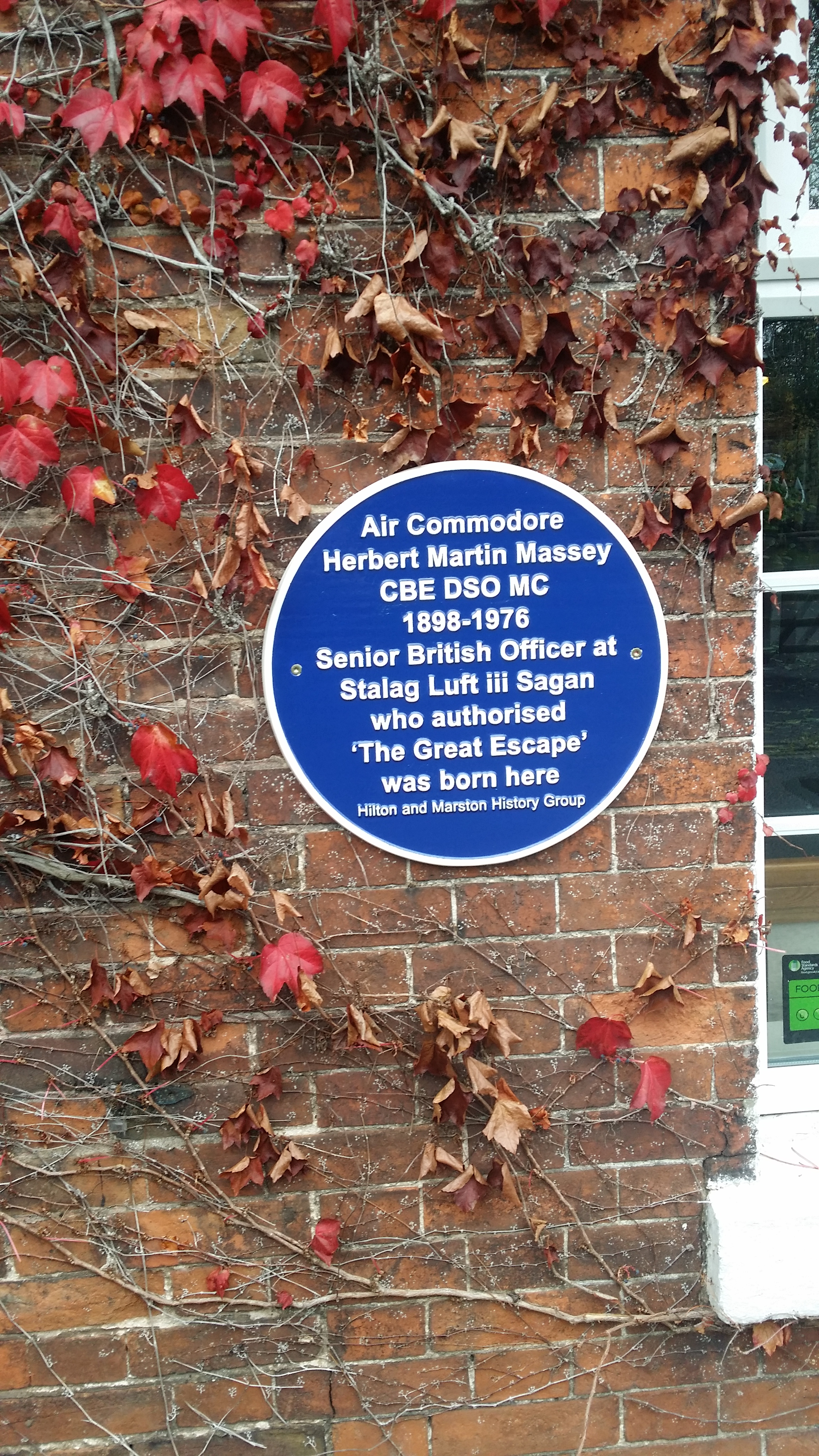
Massey's Blue plaque at Hilton House Hotel, Hilton.

After Massey's death in 1976, a memorial service in his honour was held on 22 May 1976 at St Clement Danes Church.

In the film The Great Escape (1963), a composite character, "Group Captain Ramsey" – played by James Donald – is based on both Massey and his successor as Senior British Officer at Stalag Luft III, Douglas Wilson (RAAF).

Massey is portrayed by Peter Dennis in the made-for-TV film The Great Escape II: The Untold Story (1988).

In 2016, a blue plaque was unveiled at the Hilton House Hotel where Massey was born, the first Blue Plaque in the village of Hilton.
