= Hilton House Hotel, Derby =

Historic building in Derby, England

Coordinates: 52.8724°N 1.6393°W

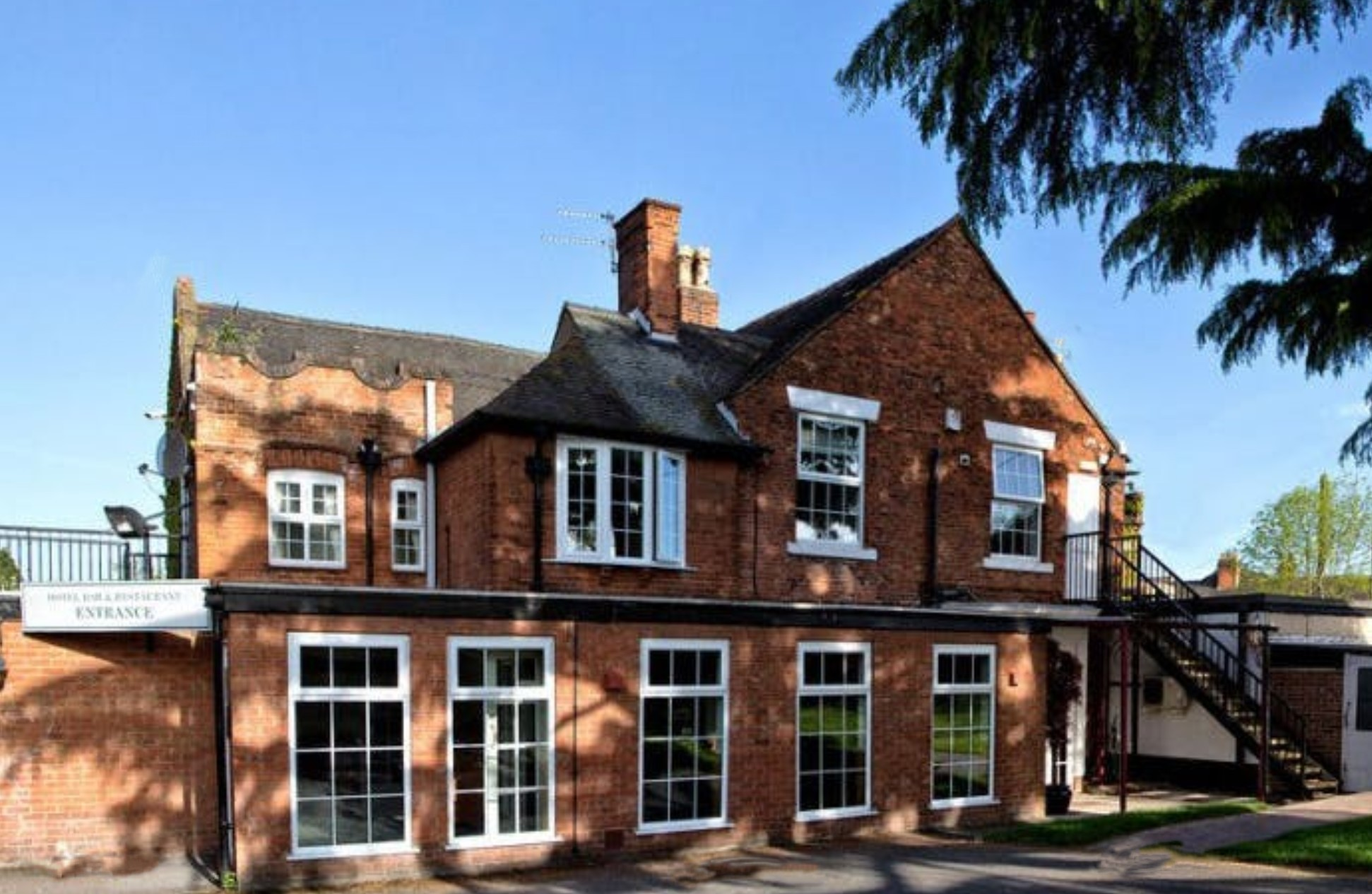
Hilton House

Hilton House Hotel, in Derby, England, is a building of historical significance. It is a Georgian house which was the ancestorial home of Herbert Martin Massey. He was the Senior British Officer at Stalag Luft III who authorised the "Great Escape". The hotel closed in February 2023. It reopened in February 2025 under the new name, 'The Hourglass, Hilton' (a sister location to 'The Hourglass, Tutbury', in Tutbury).

== Early owners ==
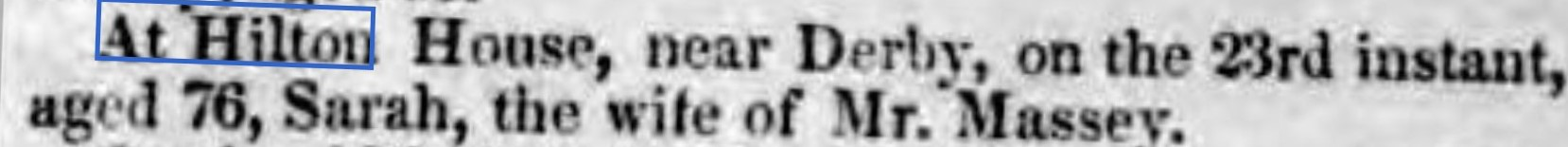
Death notice of Sarah Massey at Hilton House in 1849

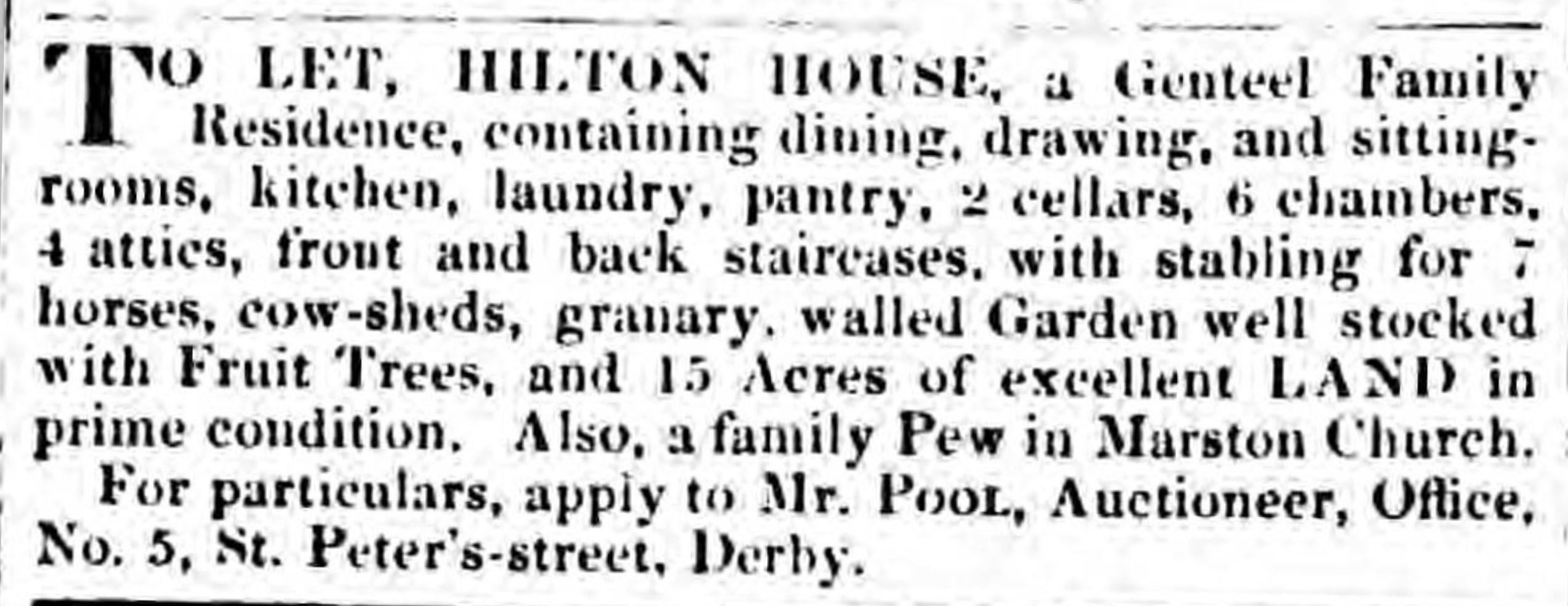
Rental notice for Hilton House in 1849

One of the early owners was Martin Massey (1773-1855) and his wife Sarah who were direct ancestors of Herbert Martin Massey. They owned the house in the early 1800s. Martin was the son of John Massey (1744-1814) who owned several properties in Hilton and lived in a house which was described in his Will as adjacent to what in those days was referred to as Worrilows Croft or Close. In 1797 Martin married Sarah Spor (1773-1849) who was the daughter of Joseph Spor of Foremark. The couple had two sons both of whom predeceased them.

Sarah died in 1849 at Hilton House. The death notice is shown. After her death Martin decided to rent the house to tenants and the rental notice is shown. He died in 1855 and was buried at St Marys Marston on Dove. As both his sons had died he left the house to his grandson William Martin Massey.

William Martin Massey (1831-1883) was the son of Joseph Spor Massey (1799-1845) who was an attorney. William was a commercial traveller and did not live at the house but instead continued to rent it to tenants for the next 25 years. One of these tenants was Samuel Ward (1806-1884), a merchant who lived there with his wife Mary for about ten years between 1868 and 1878.

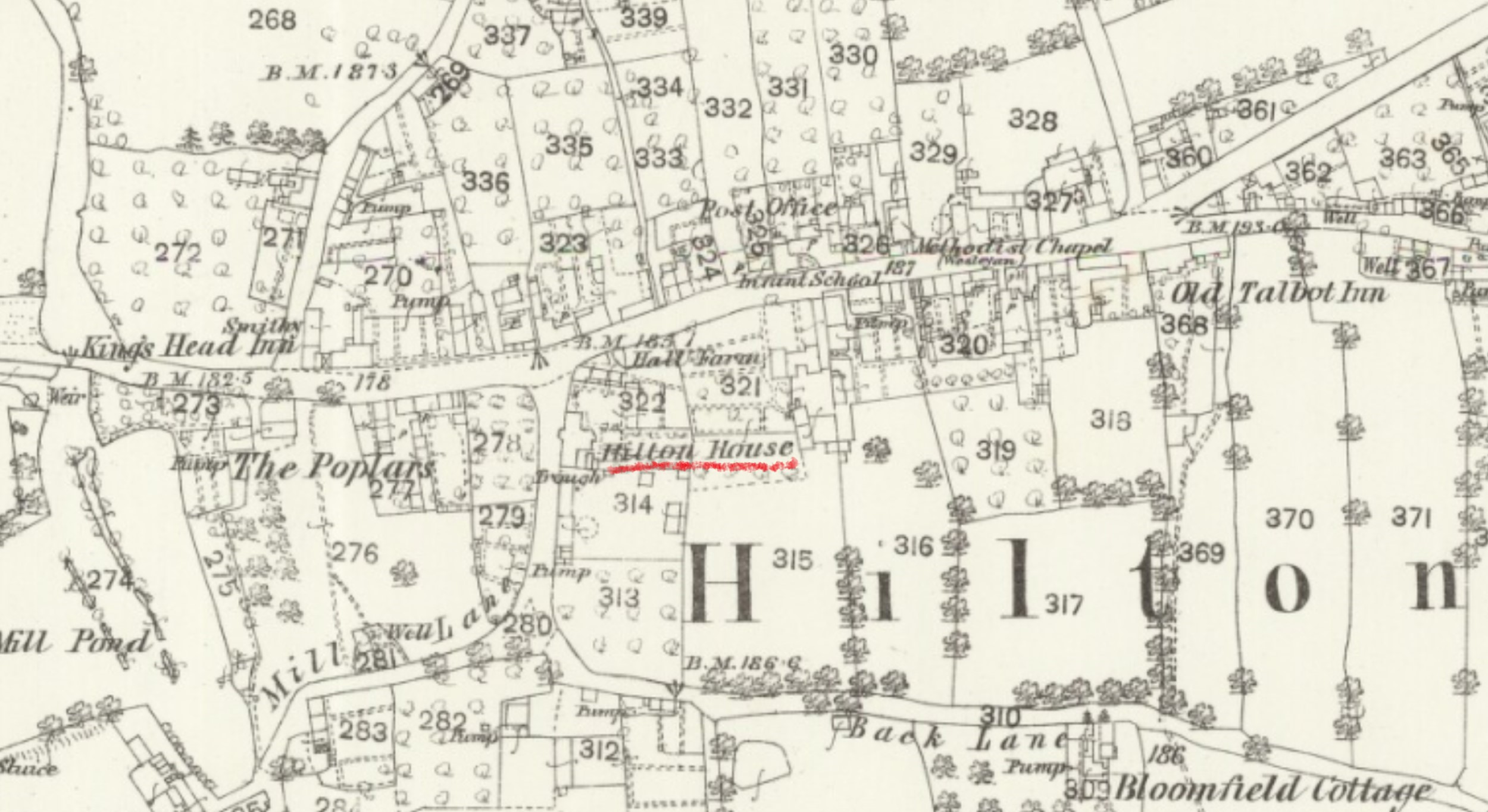
Map of Hilton in 1881

By about 1880 William decided to move into Hilton House. He is recorded in the 1881 Census as living there with his wife Sarah (nee Williamson) and two of his children including his eldest son Ernest Martin Massey who was then seventeen. William died in 1853 and Sarah and Ernest continued living at the house. Sarah Massey was the head of an employment agency for servants in Derby called “Mrs Massey's Agency” which had been started in 1845 by her mother-in-law. She is said to have made a great success of it “so that throughout the country Mrs Massey's became a household word and she became an authority on matters pertaining to Domestic Service”. The agency later became a general employment agency and still exists today as Massey's Agency in London. When Sarah died in 1892 Ernest inherited the property and the employment agency.

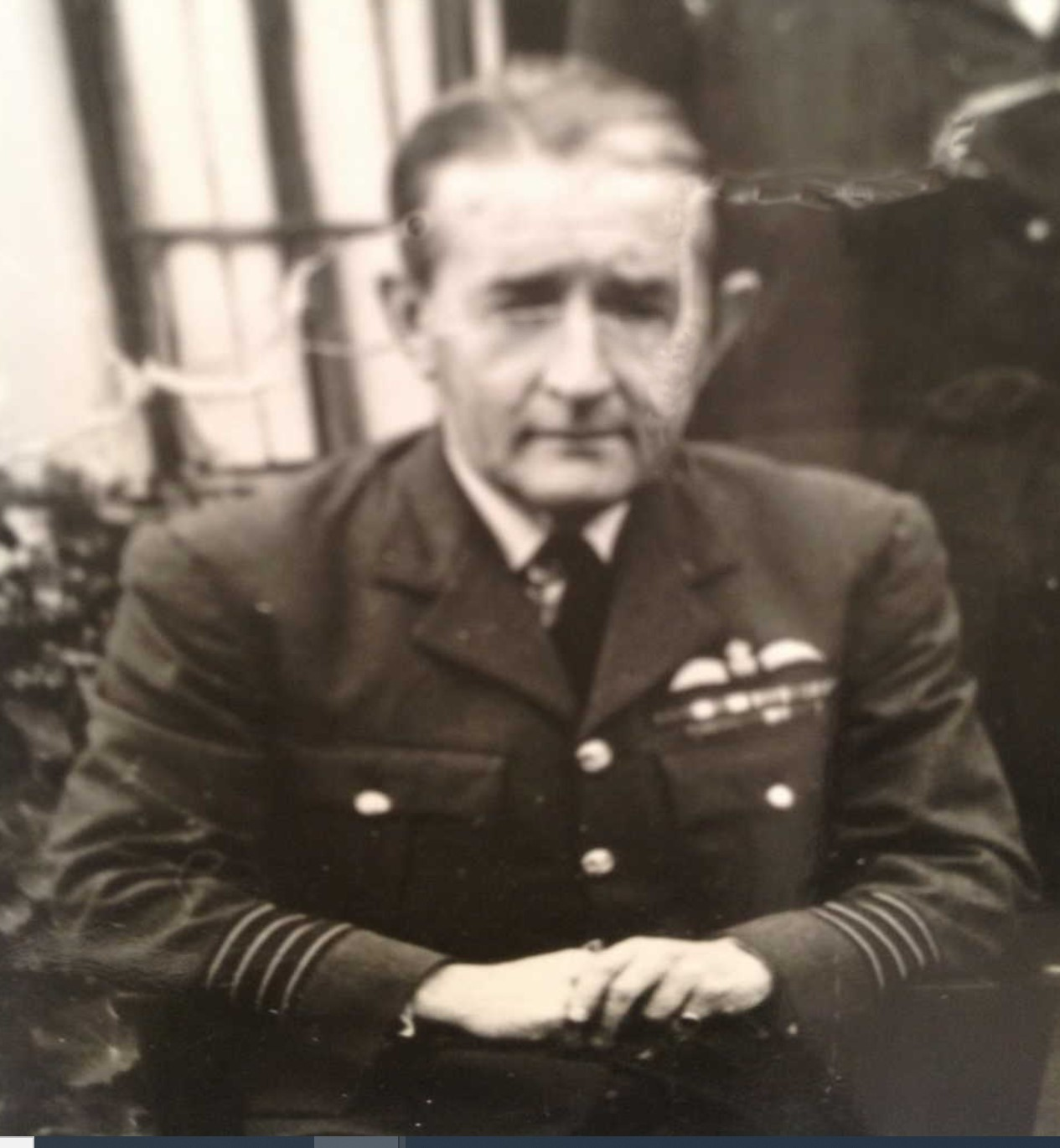
Air Commodore Herbert Martin Massey

Ernest Martin Massey (1863-1921) wanted to be an artist and had considerable talent as one of his paintings was shown in the 1895 The Exhibition of the Royal Academy of Arts. However he took over the running of the agency and continued its success. In 1895 he married Florence Lilian Warwick (1873-1956) who was the daughter of John Alfred Warwick of Derby. The couple had five daughters and two sons. Their eldest son was Herbert Martin Massey, the famous prisoner of Stalag Luft III.

Herbert Martin Massey (1898-1976) was born in Hilton House in 1898. He was educated as a child at the Spondon House Preparatory School and then later at the age of 16 he went to the Royal Military College at Sandhurst. In the following year he was an officer in the Nottingham and Derbyshire Regiment and entered the World War I. He was seriously injured when his plane was shot down by German ace flyer Werner Voss. However after the War he continued his flying career in the Royal Air Force. In 1936 he was again almost killed in Palestine during an incident for which he was awarded the Distinguished Service Order (DSO).

Over the next six years he rose through the ranks to Group Captain and then Air Commodore. Then in 1942 during World War II he was shot down over Holland. He was taken prisoner by the Germans and sent to Stalag Luft III. Here, he was the Senior British Officer and gained the admiration of his men by vigorously defending their rights. In 1944 he made the decision to authorise the Great Escape, the famous breakout from the prisoner of war camp. He did not join the escape himself as he was too badly wounded but it was to him the Germans first broke the news of the execution of fifty of those who had been recaptured. He was repatriated to Britain shortly afterwards and reported the war crime to the authorities which began the process of convicting the perpetrators after the war.

Meanwhile during this time Herbert's family continued their lives in Hilton House. His father Ernest died in 1921 and his mother Florence and sister Ruth took over the running of the employment agency. The Massey family decided to sell the house in 1933.

== Later residents ==
The next residents were Charles Andrew Newton (1877-1949) who was an engineer and his wife Marie Norah (nee Eastwood). Their son Lieutenant John Alan Newton (1919-1941) was killed during World War II in Saudi Arabia in 1941 and buried at Maali Commonwealth War Graves Cemetery, Yemen. His memorial inscription is shown at this reference. In 1944 the house was sold. It was sold again in 1949 and bought by Norman Cholerton and his wife Helena who lived there until about 1960.

Lieutenant Norman Edwin Cholerton (1917-1975) was the son of Joseph Roberts Cholerton of Duffield House near Derby. He entered the military forces at the age of 18. He became a Lieutenant in the Royal Artillery and in 1940 sailed for Singapore. Two years later he was captured by the Japanese in the Battle of Singapore and sent to a prisoner of war camp in Thailand. He is recorded as being in Camp 4 which was Kanburi – one of the famous camps because of its involvement in the building of the Burma Railway and the Bridge on the River Kwai. He returned to Derby after the War and in 1946 married Helena Mary Allen (1922-1991). Four years later he moved into Hilton house where he lived with his family for ten years. He then went to Wormsley Farm, Shirley Brailsford where he remained until his death in 1975.
