= 805 Naval Air Squadron =

Inactive flying squadron of the Royal Navy's Fleet Air Arm

- Squadron badge
- Active: 1940; 1941–1943; 1945–1948
- Disbanded: 1 July 1948
- Country: United Kingdom
- Branch: Royal Navy
- Type: Single-seat fighter squadron
- Role: Fleet fighter squadron
- Part of: Fleet Air Arm
- Home station: See Naval air stations section for full list.
- Mottos: Over sea and sand
- Engagements: World War II: Battle of Crete; Western Desert Campaign
- Battle honours: Crete 1941; Libya 1941-42

Commanders
- Notable commanders: Lieutenant Commander(A) M.F. Fell, RN

Insignia
- Squadron Badge Description: Barry wavy of four white and blue, base gold two palm trees proper (1943)
- Identification Markings: single letters (Fulmar/Buffalo/Martlet); 6A+ (Sea Gladiator); 5A+ then O5A+ (Seafire F Mk.15); O5A+ (Firefly); 101-118 (Seafire F Mk.17)
- Fin Carrier Code: O (Seafire F Mk.17)

805 Naval Air Squadron (805 NAS), also referred to as 805 Squadron, is an inactive Fleet Air Arm (FAA) naval air squadron of the United Kingdom’s Royal Navy (RN). It was last operational with the Royal Navy flying the Supermarine Seafire F Mk.17 fighter aircraft between April 1947 and June 1948 and last deployed in HMS Ocean.

The squadron was active during the Second World War and saw action over Crete and during the Western Desert Campaign. Intended to operate with Blackburn Roc, it properly formed with Fairey Fulmar and Brewster Buffalo. These were later augmented with Gloster Sea Gladiator and Hawker Hurricane. It then transitioned to Grumman Martlet and following a subsequent reformation the squadron flew Supermarine Seafire.

The squadron was reformed as 805 Squadron RAN in August 1948

== History ==
=== Seaplane fighter squadron (1940) ===
805 Naval Air Squadron was established at RNAS Donibristle (HMS Merlin), Fife, on 5 May 1940, as a Blackburn Roc seaplane fighter squadron intended for operations in Norway.

Following a conversion course at RNAS Donibristle, the initial crews relocated to RNAS Lee-on-Solent (HMS Daedalus), Hampshire, to commence training with 765 Naval Air Squadron, which additionally possessed several Blackburn Rocs equipped with floats. However, a week later, the strategy was scrapped, leading to the disbandment of the nascent squadron on 13 May.

=== Single-seat fighter squadron (1941-1943) ===
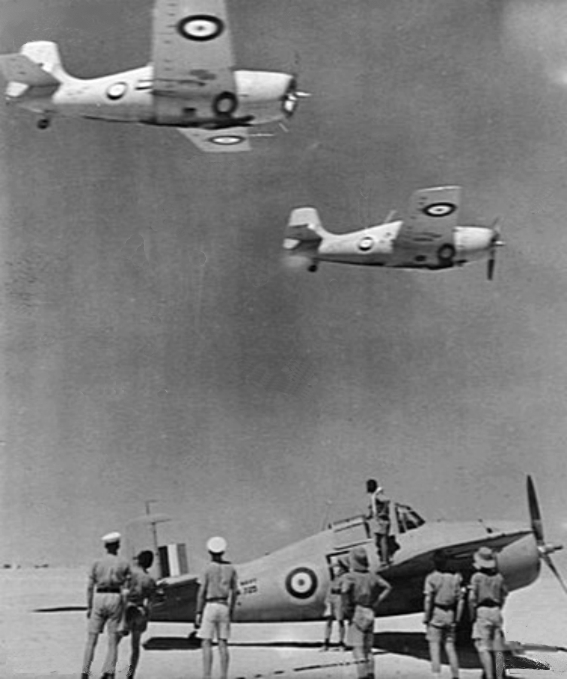
Martlet Mk III aircraft of 805 Naval Air Squadron in North Africa on 26 November 1941

On 15 November 1940, a group of aircraft and personnel intended for the newly formed 805 Squadron boarded the Explorer-class cargo ship MV Henry Stanley for their journey to West Africa. Upon arrival, the aircraft were assembled and tested on the hold covers before being lightered to the shore. Groups of up to five Fairey Fulmar aircraft subsequently flew across Africa, passing through Fort Lamy en route to Egypt, where they arrived between 13 December and 23 January 1941. The squadron was reformed on New Year’s Day 1941 at RN Air Section Aboukir, located at RAF Aboukir, North Africa. It operated with twelve aircraft, predominantly Fairey Fulmar Mk.I reconnaissance/fighter aircraft, along with a few Brewster Buffaloes, an American fighter aircraft.

Detachments were deployed aboard the aircraft carriers HMS Illustrious and HMS Eagle prior to the operations over Crete, conducting operations from the airfield at Maleme, Greece and supplemented by a number of Gloster Sea Gladiators. At RNAS Dekheila (HMS Grebe), Alexandria, Egypt, Royal Air Force (RAF) Hawker Hurricane fighter aircraft were utilised for a period; however, in July, the squadron transitioned to twelve Grumman Martlet, an American carrier-borne fighter aircraft, integrating into the temporary RN Fighter Squadron in the Western Desert, a provisional merger of 803, 805, and 806 Squadrons at Dekheila on the 2nd of August 1941 and subsequently served with the RAF's 264, 269, and 234 Wings.

The combined unit disbanded in February 1942; however, 805 Squadron remained operational in the Western Desert until it relocated to the Canal Zone at the conclusion of June to provide shipping protection. Shortly thereafter, it proceeded southward to Kenya, passing through Luxor, Wadi Halfa, Khartoum, Malakal, Juba, and Kismu, under the guidance of an RAF Lockheed Hudson. In December, the squadron was re-equipped with Grumman Martlet Mk IVs; however, several aircraft were lost during a failed attempt to relocate to Durban. Consequently, on 10 January 1943, the squadron was disbanded.

=== Seafire (1945-1948) ===
805 Naval Air Squadron was re-established in July 1945 at RNAS Machrihanish (HMS Landrail), Argyll and Bute, with twenty-five Supermarine Seafire L Mk.Is. In September, these aircraft were substituted with twenty-five Supermarine Seafire F Mk.XVs.

The Seafire F Mk.XV, which was the inaugural variant powered by the Rolls-Royce Griffon engine, made its maiden flight in February 1944. In addition to the incorporation of the Griffon VI engine, the Mk.XV was distinct from its predecessors due to its enhanced fuel capacity, featuring tanks located within the wings. Furthermore, the sting-type arrester hook became a standard feature. It commenced service with FAA squadrons in August 1945.

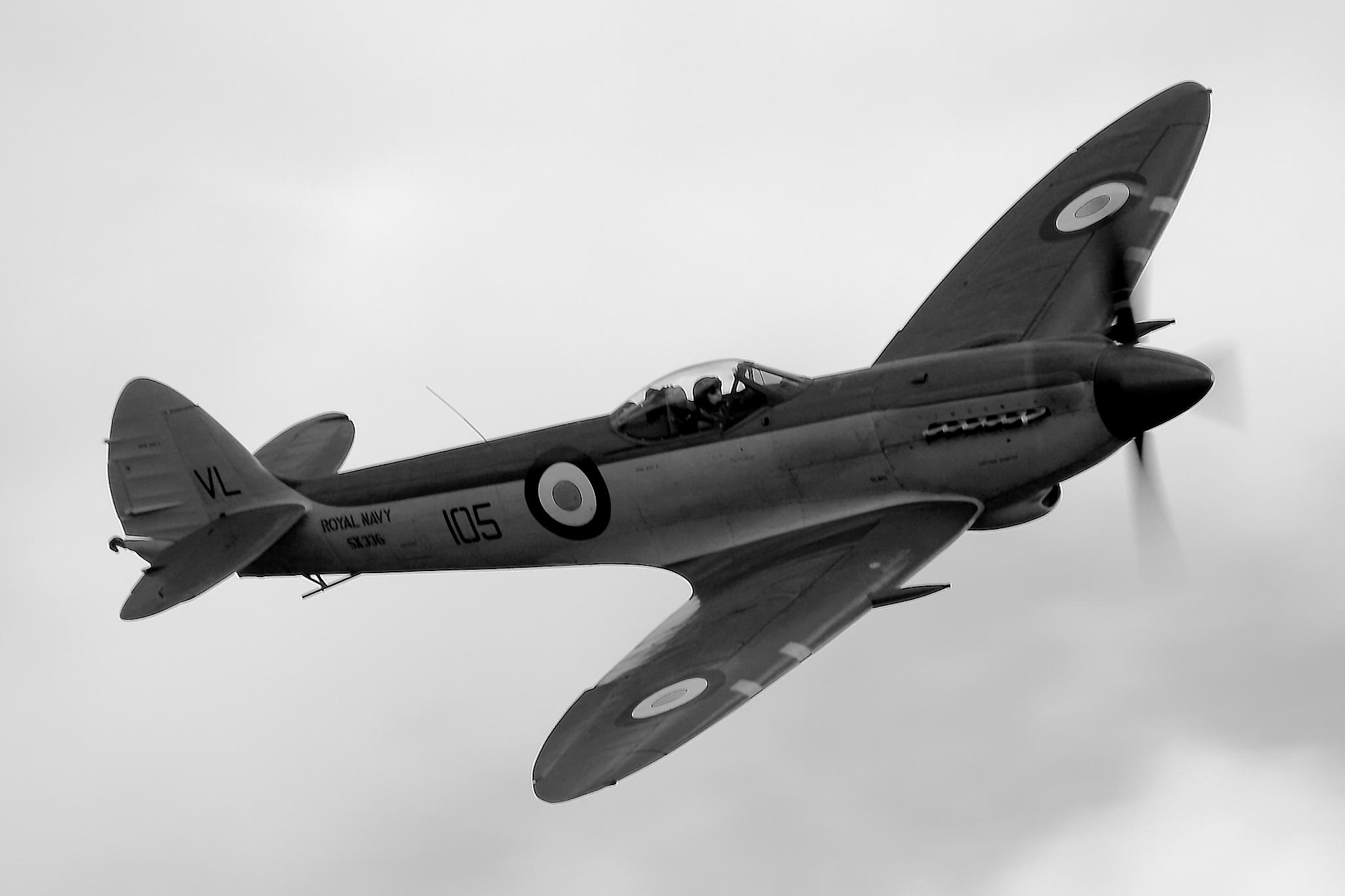
Seafire F Mk.17; an example of the type used by 805 NAS

This variant was for the squadron’s use with the 20th Carrier Air Group. It embarked in HMS Ocean in June and disembarked in August, at which point the Seafire F Mk.XVs were prohibited from landing on the deck due to technical issues. As a temporary solution, 805 Squadron utilised Fairey Firefly FR.Is as single-seat fighters for continued operations aboard HMS Ocean. Additionally, the Night Fighter Unit, equipped with four Firefly NF.Mk I night fighter aircraft, was attached for a duration of three months starting in November. More suitable equipment was received in April 1947, consisting of twelve Supermarine Seafire F Mk.17s.

The Seafire F Mk.17 represented an enhancement of the Mk.XV. It was characterised by a clear-view bubble hood and a cutaway rear fuselage. Additionally, a 33-gallon tank was installed in the rear fuselage. Furthermore, it featured a significantly reinforced long-stroke undercarriage. The squadron operated this variant until its disbandment at RNAS Eglinton (HMS Gannet), County Londonderry, in July 1948.

== Aircraft flown ==
The squadron has flown a number of different aircraft types:

- Blackburn Roc fighter aircraft (May 1940)
- Fairey Fulmar Mk.I reconnaissance/fighter aircraft (January - July 1941)
- Brewster Buffalo fighter aircraft (January - August 1941)
- Gloster Sea Gladiator biplane fighter aircraft (March - June 1941)
- Hawker Hurricane Mk I fighter aircraft (May - June 1941)
- Grumman Martlet Mk III fighter aircraft (June 1941 - December 1942)
- Grumman Martlet Mk II fighter aircraft (September 1942)
- Grumman Martlet Mk IV fighter aircraft (December 1942 - January 1943)
- Supermarine Seafire L Mk.III fighter aircraft (July - August 1945)
- Supermarine Seafire F Mk.XV fighter aircraft (August 1945 - August 1946)
- Fairey Firefly FR.I reconnaissance/fighter aircraft (August 1946 - April 1947)
- Fairey Firefly NF.Mk I night fighter aircraft (November 1946 - January 1947)
- Supermarine Seafire F Mk.17 fighter aircraft (April 1947 - June 1948)

== Battle honours ==
The battle honours awarded to 805 Naval Air Squadron are:

- Crete 1941
- Libya 1941-42

== Assignments ==
805 Naval Air Squadron was assigned as needed to form part of a number of larger units:

- 20th Carrier Air Group (March 1946 - July 1948)

== Naval air stations ==
805 Naval Air Squadron was active at various naval air stations of the Royal Navy and Royal Air Force stations, both within the United Kingdom and internationally. Additionally, it operated from a number of Royal Navy fleet carriers, as well as other airbases located abroad:

1940

- Royal Naval Air Station Donibristle (HMS Merlin), Fife, (4 - 7 May 1940)
- Royal Naval Air Station Lee-on-Solent (HMS Daedalus), Hampshire, (7 - 13 May 1940)
- disbanded - (13 May 1940)

1941 - 1943

- RN Air Section Aboukir, Egypt, (1 January - 5 February 1941)
  - Royal Naval Air Station Dekheila (HMS Grebe), Alexandria, Egypt, (Detachment 1 - 23 January 1941)
  - HMS Illustrious (Detachment 2 - 4 January 1941)
  - HMS Eagle (Detachment four aircraft 30 January 1941)
- Royal Naval Air Station Dekheila (HMS Grebe), Alexandria, Egypt, (5 - 18 February 1941)
  - RN Air Section Aboukir, Egypt, (Detachment three aircraft 11 - 15 February 1941)
  - Maleme Airfield, Crete, (Detachment three aircraft 15 - 18 February 1941)
- HMS Eagle (18 - 23 February 1941)
- RN Air Section Aboukir, Egypt, (23 - 24 February 1941)
- Royal Naval Air Station Dekheila (HMS Grebe), Alexandria, Egypt, (24 February - 6 March 1941)
  - Maleme Airfield, Crete, (Detachment three aircraft 21 February - 6 March 1941)
- Maleme Airfield, Crete, (6 March - 19 May 1941)
  - RN Air Section Aboukir, Egypt, (Detachment three aircraft 10 - 20 March 1941)
  - HMS Formidable (Detachment 16 - 18 March 1941)
  - RN Air Section Aboukir, Egypt, (Detachment four aircraft 18 - 21 March 1941)
  - HMS Formidable (Detachment four aircraft 21 - 28 April 1941)
- Royal Naval Air Station Dekheila (HMS Grebe), Alexandria, Egypt, (19 May - 22 July 1941)
  - Mersa Matruh Airfield, Egypt, (Detachment three aircraft 16 - 17 June 1941)
- Ma'aten Bagush, Egypt, (22 July - 2 August 1941)
- Royal Naval Air Station Dekheila (HMS Grebe), Alexandria, Egypt, (2 - 17 August 1941)
- Sidi Haneish North, Egypt, (17 - 31 August 1941)
- Royal Naval Air Station Dekheila (HMS Grebe), Alexandria, Egypt, (31 August - 6 September 1941)
- Sidi Haneish North, Egypt, (6 September - 14 November 1941)
- LG-109 - Landing Ground 109, Egypt, (14 - 19 November 1941)
- LG-123 - Fort Maddelena III, Libya, (19 - 24 November 1941)
- LG-128 - Landing Ground 128 Maddalena, Egypt, (24 - 25 November 1941)
- LG-123 - Fort Maddelena III, Libya, (25 November - 12 December 1941)
- Tobruk, Libya, (12 December - 7 January 1941)
- Ma'aten Bagush, Egypt, (7 - 26 January 1942)
- LG-05 - Sidi Barrani, Egypt, (26 January - 14 March 1942)
- Royal Naval Air Station Dekheila (HMS Grebe), Alexandria, Egypt, (14 March - 6 April 1942)
- Ma'aten Bagush, Egypt, (6 April - 31 May 1942)
- LG-20 - El Daba, Egypt, (31 May - 27 June 1942)
- Royal Naval Air Station Dekheila (HMS Grebe), Alexandria, Egypt, (27 - 29 June 1942)
- Royal Air Force El Gamil, Egypt, (29 June - 4 August 1942)
- Royal Air Force Fayid, Egypt, (4 - 22 August 1942)
- transit (22 - 27 August 1942)
- Nairobi, Kenya, (27 August - 10 January 1942)
- disbanded - (10 January 1943)

1945 - 1948

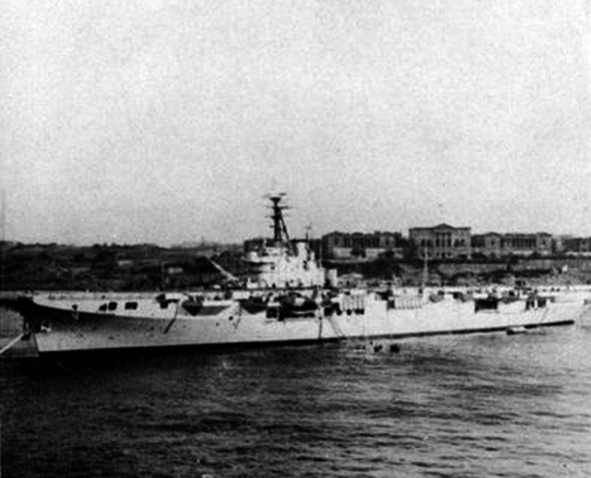
HMS Ocean at Malta, in 1948

- Royal Naval Air Station Machrihanish (HMS Landrail), Argyll and Bute, (1 July 1945 - 25 March 1946)
- Royal Naval Air Station Lee-on-Solent (HMS Daedalus), Hampshire, (25 March - 19 June 1946)
- HMS Ocean (19 June - 4 August 1946)
  - RN Air Section Gibraltar, Gibraltar, (Detachment 15 July - 1 August 1946)
- Royal Naval Air Station Hal Far (HMS Falcon), Malta, (4 August - 18 September 1946)
- HMS Ocean (18 September - 15 November 1946)
- Royal Naval Air Station Hal Far (HMS Falcon), Malta, (15 November - 27 December 1946)
- HMS Ocean (27 December 1946 - 15 March 1947)
- Royal Naval Air Station Hal Far (HMS Falcon), Malta, (15 March - 5 June 1947)
- HMS Ocean (5 June - 22 August 1947)
- Royal Naval Air Station Hal Far (HMS Falcon), Malta, (22 August - 2 October 1947)
- HMS Ocean (2 October - 11 November 1947)
- Royal Naval Air Station Hal Far (HMS Falcon), Malta, (11 November 1947 - 15 January 1948)
- HMS Ocean (15 January - 20 April 1948)
- Royal Naval Air Station Hal Far (HMS Falcon), Malta, (20 April - 7 May 1948)
- HMS Ocean (7 - 18 May 1948)
- Royal Naval Air Station Hal Far (HMS Falcon), Malta, (18 May - 14 June 1948)
- HMS Ocean (14 - 28 June 1948)
- Royal Naval Air Station Eglinton (HMS Gannet), County Londonderry, (28 June - 1 July 1948)
- disbanded - (1 July 1948)

== Commanding officers ==
List of commanding officers of 805 Naval Air Squadron:

1940

- Major R.C. Hay, RM, from 4 May 1940
- disbanded - 13 May 1940

1941 - 1943

- Lieutenant Commander A.F. Black, RN, from 1 January 1941
- Captain L.A. Harris, DSC, RM, from 27 July 1941
- Lieutenant E.A. Shaw, RN, from 31 August 1941
- Lieutenant Commander T.P. Coode, DSC, RN, from 5 May 1942
- Lieutenant Commander(A) M.F. Fell, RN, from 27 August 1942
- disbanded - 10 January 1943

1945 - 1948

- Lieutenant Commander(A) P.J. Hutton, DSC, RNVR, from 1 July 1945
- Lieutenant Commander P.E.I. Bailey, RN, from 28 September 1947
- disbanded - 1 July 1948

Note: Abbreviation (A) signifies Air Branch of the RN or RNVR.
