= List of North African airfields during World War II =

This is a partial list of British Landing Grounds (LG) in North Africa, used during World War II. There are over 250 known LGs. Not all of these were active airfields; some were depots, some were repair stations, and some were decoys. Some are still in use, and some were moved and upgraded by Americans to handle heavy bombers.

LG-176 through LG-186 were also numbered LG 1 through 10.

== Landing grounds ==
=== 001-099 ===
LG-number	Name	German name	Coordinate	RAF Squadrons	Notes
LG-01	Buq Buq		31°29′0″N 25°24′0″E		
LG-02	Sidi Barrani		31°35′05″N 25°57′0″E	14, 22, 33, 39, 55, 80, 112, 113, 127, 203, 208, 237 & 274	
LG-03	Sidi Barrani Satellite		31°34′0″N 25°56′0″E		
LG-04	Sidi Barrani West		31°34′0″N 25°53′0″E		
LG-05	X-LG		31°32′05″N 26°01′0″E	18, 30, 39, 203, 213, 221, 252, 272 & 459	
LG-06	Y-LG		31°23′0″N 26°37′0″E	112 & 237	
LG-07	Z-LG (Matruh West)	Bir El Astas	31°20′0″N 26°51′0″E	47, 112, 213, 238, 250, 272, 274, 294 & 459	
LG-08	Mersa Matruh		31°20′0″N 27°12′05″E	47, 74, 127, 335, 336 & 451	
LG-09	Bir Koriayim		30°58′0″N 28°12′0″E	11, 37, 38, 108, 148, 162 & 462	
LG-10	Gerawala		31°11′0″N 27°21′0″E	208, 237, 272 & 335	
LG-11	Qasaba		31°10′05″N 27°27′0″E	6, 14, 30, 33, 45, 73, 208 & 451	
LG-12	Sidi Haneish North	Haggag el Quasaba East	31°09′05″N 27°32′0″E; 31°08′30″N 27°31′15″E	33, 213, 229, 238, 250 & 450	
LG-13	Sidi Haneish South	Zimlet El Thalaba	31°07′05″N 27°31′0″E; 31°06′30″N 27°30′30″E	73, 80, 92, 145, 238, 250, 274 & 335	
LG-14	Maaten Bagush	Zawyet Harun	31°09′0″N 27°39′05″E; 31°09′10″N 27°39′20″E	3, 30, 31, 113, 162, 208, 213 & 216	
LG-15	Maaten Bagush satellite Bir Zimla?	Bir Abu Smeit	31°06′0″N 27°44′0″E	14, 39, 55, 127, 145 & 238	
LG-16	Fuka satellite (Fukah)	Abu Haggag	31°06′0″N 27°49′0″E; 31°06′10″N 27°48′50″E	39 & 45	
LG-17	Fuka Main		31°04′0″N 27°57′0″E	39 & 55	
LG-18	Fuka South		31°03′0″N 27°56′0″E	80	
LG-19	Fuka East		31°04′0″N 27°57′05″E		
LG-20	Qotafiyah I	Sanyet Turbiya	31°04′0″N 28°18′0″E; 31°04′0″N 28°19′30″E	73, 127, 213, 238 & 335	
LG-21	Qotafiyah III		30°59′0″N 28°17′0″E	14, 55, 73, 92, 145 & 601	
LG-22	Daba Satellite		31°05′0″N 28°27′0″E		
LG-23	Turbiya		31°02′0″N 28°28′0″E		
LG-24	Daba South		30°56′0″N 28°12′0″E		
LG-25	Sidi Abdel Rahman		30°56′0″N 28°43′0″E		
LG-26	El Imayid		30°44′0″N 29°16′0″E		
LG-27	El Hamman		30°48′0″N 29°27′0″E		
LG-28	Burg el Arab		30°53′5″N 29°32′0″E	208	
LG-29	Amiriya		30°58′0″N 29°49′0″E	29, 30, 33, 47, 80, 84, 94, 112, 117, 208, 216, 250, 267 & 274	
LG-30	Amiriya Satellite		30°58′0″N 29°50′0″E		
LG-31	Ikingi		31°0′0″N 29°47′0″E		
LG-32	Dekheila		31°08′0″N 29°48′0″E	73, 74, 80, 89, 145, 213 & 335	
LG-33	Aboukir North		31°18′0″N 30°04′0″E		RAF Aboukir Bay?
LG-34	Aboukir		31°18′05″N 30°03′40″E	29, 56, 64, 80, 94, 112, 123, 142, 145, 208, 237, 252, 1294, 451, 603 & 651	
LG-35	Bir Hooker		30°22′0″N 30°26′0″E; 30°25′30″N 30°21′0″E		
LG-36	Khatbara		30°21′0″N 30°47′0″E		
LG-37	El Hamman South		30°47′0″N 29°27′0″E	6, 80, 127, 274 & 335	
LG-38	El Hamman East		30°48′0″N 29°30′0″E		
LG-39	Burgh El Arab South		30°51′5″N 29°33′0″E	73, 145, 203, 208, 221 & 459	
LG-40	Bahig South		30°53′0″N 29°37′0″E	459	
LG-41	Bahig East		30°55′0″N 29°40′0″E		
LG-42	El Naheidat				
LG-43	Bir Kenayis		31°01′0″N 26°48′0″E	80 & 208	
LG-44	Wadi Natrun ?		30°26′0″N 30°21′0″E		
LG-45	Landing Ground 45		30°11′0″N 30°05′0″E		
LG-46	Landing Ground 46		30°13′0″N 29°58′0″E		
LG-47	Landing Ground 47		30°15′0″N 29°47′0″E		
LG-48	Landing Ground 48		30°16′0″N 29°41′0″E		
LG-49	Landing Ground 49		30°18′0″N 29°35′0″E		
LG-50	Landing Ground 50		30°21′0″N 29°23′0″E		
LG-51	Landing Ground 51		30°26′0″N 29°14′0″E		
LG-52	Landing Ground 52		30°26′0″N 28°59′0″E		
LG-53	Landing Ground 53		30°40′0″N 27°55′0″E		
LG-54	Landing Ground 54		30°40′0″N 27°51′0″E		
LG-55	Landing Ground 55		30°36′0″N 27°50′0″E		
LG-56	Landing Ground 56		30°41′0″N 27°49′0″E		
LG-57	Landing Ground 57		30°46′0″N 27°51′0″E		
LG-58	Landing Ground 58		30°43′0″N 27°46′0″E		
LG-59	Landing Ground 59		30°41′0″N 27°43′0″E		
LG-60	Landing Ground 60	Bir el Quseir	30°49′0″N 27°33′0″E; 30°42′0″N 27°33′0″E	38 & 148	
LG-61	Landing Ground 61		30°42′0″N 27°39′0″E		
LG-62	Landing Ground 62		30°53′0″N 27°36′0″E		
LG-63	Landing Ground 63		30°42′0″N 27°27′0″E		
LG-64	Landing Ground 64		30°41′0″N 27°24′0″E		
LG-65	Landing Ground 65		30°46′0″N 27°25′0″E		
LG-66	Siwa North		29°21′5″N 25°31′0″E	6 & 208	
LG-67	Siwa Town		29°11′0″N 25°31′0″E	6 & 208	
LG-68	Bagush Waterloo	Abar-Nimeir	31°07′0″N 27°47′0″E	113	
LG-69	Bir Basur		29°54′0″N 25°55′0″E		
LG-70	Landing Ground 70		31°09′0″N 26°32′0″E		
LG-71	Landing Ground 71		31°11′0″N 26°32′0″E		
LG-72	Landing Ground 72		29°30′0″N 26°23′0″E		
LG-73	Bir Fuad		30°26′0″N 26°28′0″E		
LG-74	Landing Ground 74		31°06′0″N 26°32′0″E		
LG-75	Landing Ground 75		31°12′0″N 26°04′0″E	6, 14, 33, 45, 70, 84, 112, 113, 208, 213, 237, 250, 260, 450 & 451	
LG-76	Landing Ground 76	Bir el malla	31°10′0″N 26°05′0″E; 31°10′0″N 26°03′0″E	11, 14, 33, 37, 73, 112, 145, 213, 238, 250, 260 & 450	
LG-77	Landing Ground 77		30°45′0″N 29°26′0″E		
LG-78	Landing Ground 78		31°07′0″N 25°32′0″E		
LG-79	Landing Ground 79		31°24′0″N 25°31′0″E	55, 112 & 208	
LG-80	Landing ground 80		31°23′0″N 25°22′0″E		
LG-81	Landing Ground 81		31°24′0″N 25°24′0″E	45	
LG-82	Landing Ground 82		30°28′0″N 30°16′0″E		
LG-83	Landing Ground 83		30°28′5″N 30°12′5″E		
LG-84	Landing Ground 84		30°28′5″N 30°13′5″E		
LG-85	Landing Ground 85		30°47′0″N 29°51′5″E	33, 73, 80, 213, 260, 335 & 601	
LG-86	Landing Ground 86	Bir Abu Ogos II	30°51′5″N 29°52′0″E	22, 39, 55, 162 & 223	
LG-87	Landing Ground 87		30°50′0″N 29°52′5″E	47 & 221	
LG-88	Landing Ground 88		30°59′5″N 29°51′5″E	14, 127 & 274	
LG-89	Landing Ground 89		30°49′0″N 29°55′5″E	6, 47, 73, 127, 221 & 274	
LG-90	Landing Ground 90		30°51′5″N 29°54′5″E	213 & 451	
LG-91	Landing Ground 91		30°52′0″N 29°54′0″E	6, 38, 52, 112, 162, 203, 250, 252, 294, 450, 454, 458, 459 & 603	
LG-92	Landing Ground 92		30°54′0″N 29°51′0″E	80, 127, 145, 238, 274 & 601	
LG-93	Landing Ground 93		31°00′0″N 29°48′0″E	229	
LG-94	Landing Ground 94		30°59′0″N 29°47′5″E		
LG-95	Landing Ground 95 Ikingi		30°59′0″N 29°46′5″E	55	
LG-97	Landing Ground 97		30°48′5″N 29°57′0″E	14 & 260	
LG-98	Landing Ground 98		30°47′5″N 29°55′5″E	14, 55 & 223	
LG-99	Landing Ground 99		30°48′5″N 29°54′5″E	55, 221 & 223	

=== 100-186 ===
LG-number	Name	German name	Coordinate	Squadrons	Notes
LG-100	Wadi Natrun	Wadi El Natrun	30°26′0″N 30°21′0″E; 30°27′30″N 30°17′0″E	55 & 208	
LG-101	Landing Ground 101	Haggag el Quasaba west	31°06′0″N 27°31′0″E	33, 74, 203, 213, 238, 250, 260 & 450	
LG-102	Landing Ground 102	Abar El Afan	31°06′0″N 27°33′05″E; 31°06′45″N 27°34′0″E	6, 30, 80, 112, 229, 250 & 450	
LG-103	Landing Ground 103		31°03′0″N 27°46′0″E	80, 94, 208 & 274	
LG-104	Qotafiyah II	Sanyet El Qutaifiya	31°02′5″N 28°16′5″E; 31°02′30″N 28°18′0″E	11, 40, 70, 104, 148, 162, 208, 272 & 335	
LG-105	El Daba		31°00′0″N 28°28′0″E	74, 108, 238 & 274	
LG-106	Landing Ground 106		30°58′0″N 28°39′0″E	6, 37, 70, 74, 104, 108, 112, 148, 237, 238, 250, 450 & 451	
LG-107	Giarabub		29°46′0″N 24°32′0″E	33 & 113	
LG-108	Giarabub No. 2		29°35′0″N 24°41′0″E	6, 33 & 113	
LG-109	Landing Ground 109		31°01′0″N 25°51′0″E	80, 94, 250 & 260	
LG-110	Landing Ground 110		30°59′5″N 25°57′0″E	94, 112, 250 & 274	
LG-111	Landing Ground 111	Bir umm Gilwakh	31°00′0″N 25°58′0″E	80, 229 & 274	
LG-112	Landing Ground 112		30°51′5″N 25°56′0″E	208 & 237	
LG-113	Landing Ground 113		30°46′5″N 26°03′5″E		
LG-115	Landing Ground 115		31°04′0″N 27°38′0″E	73, 94, 112 & 260	
LG-116	Landing Ground 116		31°04′5″N 27°41′0″E	11, 14, 84, 113 & 223	
LG-117	Landing Ground 117	Bir Abu Sheheima	31°03′0″N 27°44′0″E; 31°04′20″N 27°44′20″E	38	
LG-118	El Thalata		31°08′0″N 25°50′0″E		
LG-119	Landing Ground 119		29°42′0″N 24°35′0″E		
LG-120	Landing Ground 120		29°16′0″N 25°46′0″E		
LG-121	Landing Ground 121		31°32′0″N 26°11′5″E	30, 80, 134, 223, 238, 335 & 336	
LG-122	Landing Ground 122		30°55′0″N 25°06′0″E	112 & 250	
LG-123	Fort Maddelena III		30°53′5″N 24°52′7″E	80, 208, 229, 238 & 250	
LG-124	Fort Maddelena Esc Scegga		30°52′5″N 24°57′5″E	94, 260 & 274	
LG-125	Landing Ground 125		30°18′5″N 22°54′0″E	33, 113, 213 & 238	
LG-126	Landing Ground 126		30°43′5″N 25°05′0″E		
LG-127	Landing Ground 127		30°58′0″N 25°10′0″E		
LG-128	Landing Ground 128		30°52′0″N 25°50′0″E	80, 208, 237 & 451	
LG-130	Landing Ground 130		30°56′5″N 25°55′0″E	274	
LG-131	Landing Ground 131		31°04′5″N 25°19′5″E	208 & 451	
LG-132	Landing Ground 132	Gasr el Abid	31°06′5″N 24°53′5″E; 31°07′30″N 24°53′20″E	237 & 451	
LG-133	Landing Ground 133		30°55′0″N 25°13′5″E	80	
LG-134	Landing Ground 134		31°06′5″N 24°28′5″E	208	
LG-135	Landing Ground 135		31°07′0″N 24°17′5″E		
LG-136	Landing Ground 136		31°04′5″N 24°14′5″E		
LG-137	Landing Ground 137		31°06′5″N 24°10′5″E		
LG-138	Landing Ground 138		30°52′0″N 25°12′0″E		
LG-139	Gambut No.1 Main	Gambut	31°52′5″N 24°29′5″E; 31°52′30″N 24°29′30″E	see article	
LG-140	Bir El Baheira 1		a31°48′0″N 24°44′5″E	37 & 70	
LG-141	Gasr el Arid		31°45′07″N 24°33′7″E	73, 94, 208, 260 & 274	
LG-142	Gambut No.2		31°51′05″N 24°32′5″E	see article	
LG-143	Gambut No.3		31°50′05″N 24°36′5″E	221, 272 & 459	
LG-144	El Adem No. 1		31°52′0″N 23°55′5″E	see article	
LG-145	Tobruk No. 2/El Gubbi East		32°02′7″N 23°57′3″E	6, 39, 45, 46, 55, 73, 80, 203, 208, 223, 238, 250, 252 & 451	
LG-146	Tobruk No. 3/El Gubbi West		32°02′8″N 23°54′3″E	6, 39, 45, 46, 55, 73, 80, 203, 208, 223, 238, 250, 252 & 451	
LG-147	Bu Amud	Bu Amud	31°56′05″N 24°10′5″E; 31°56′30″N 24°10′30″E	6, 11, 14, 39, 45, 46, 55, 73, 80, 89, 94, 108, 123, 134, 203, 229, 237 & 336	
LG-148	Sidi Azeiz	Sidi Azeis	31°40′2″N 24°53′7″E; 31°40′0″N 24°54′0″E	see article	
LG-149	Gazala No.1		32°10′7″N 23°21′2″E	33, 45, 55, 73, 80, 94, 112, 216, 229, 238, 250, 260, 274 & 450	
LG-150	Gazala No.2		32°08′5″N 23°25′4″E	33, 45, 55, 73, 80, 94, 112, 216, 229, 238, 250, 260, 274 & 450	
LG-151	Landing Ground 151		30°49′0″N 29°22′0″E		Unused by Axis forces.
LG-152	Gazala No.3		32°08′2″N 23°27′0″E	33, 45, 55, 73, 80, 94, 112, 216, 229, 238, 250, 260, 274 & 450	
LG-153	Sidi Rezegh		31°48′5″N 24°08′0″E	94, 208 & 260	
LG-154	Landing Ground 154		30°46′5″N 29°50′5″E	33, 145, 213, 238 & 601	
LG-155	Landing Ground 155		31°07′0″N 25°59′0″E	73, 145, 213, 238 & 601	
LG-156	Gambut No.4 Comms		31°54′0″N 24°25′5″E	see article	
LG-157	El Adem No.2		31°50′5″N 23°56′0″E	see article	
LG-158	Gambut No.6		31°50′0″N 24°39′0″E	see article	
LG-159	Gambut No.5		31°52′0″N 24°25′5″E	see article	
LG-160	Landing Ground 160		31°25′7″N 23°23′0″E		
LG-161	Baltet El Atasc		31°29′5″N 23°29′0″E		
LG-162	Landing Ground 162		31°25′7″N 23°23′0″E		
LG-163	Landing Ground 163		31°24′5″N 24°26′0″E	208	
LG-164	Sidi Aziez No.2 West		31°41′5″N 24°48′0″E		
LG-165	Landing Ground 165 (Bir el Regal)		31°30′1″N 21°45′5″E	274	
LG-166	Landing Ground 166		31°07′0″N 25°31′0″E		
LG-167	Bir El Baheira 2		31°48′0″N 24°50′5″E	148 & 462	
LG-170	Bir El Gobi Gubbi?		31°30′5″N 24°04′5″E	6, 39, 45, 46, 55, 73, 80, 203, 208, 223, 238, 250, 252 & 451	
LG-171	Landing Ground 171		30°56′0″N 29°31′0″E		
LG-172	Landing Ground 172		30°46′5″N 29°29′0″E	6, 33, 127, 145, 213 & 238	
LG-173	Landing Ground 173		30°52′5″N 29°51′5″E	92, 145, 264, 335 & 601	
LG-174	Landing Ground 174		30°52′0″N 29°56′0″E		
LG-175	Landing Ground 175		30°55′0″N 29°55′0″E	112, 417 & 450	
LG-176	Landing Ground 176 LG1		28°26′0″N 21°45′5″E		
LG-177	Landing Ground 177 LG2		27°52′0″N 21°57′0″E		
LG-178	Landing Ground 178 LG3		27°20′0″N 22°08′0″E		
LG-179	Landing Ground 179 LG4		26°46′0″N 22°20′0″E		
LG-180	El Maezil LG5		26°13′0″N 22°31′0″E		
LG-181	Bir Dacar LG6		25°39′0″N 22°45′0″E		
LG-182	Landing Ground 182 LG7		25°05′0″N 22°57′0″E		
LG-183	Landing Ground 183 LG7 new		25°16′0″N 22°55′0″E		
LG-184	Landing Ground 184 LG8		24°39′0″N 23°07′0″E		
LG-185	Landing Ground 185 LG9		23°32′0″N 23°50′0″E		
LG-186	Landing Ground 186 LG10		22°51′0″N 24°15′0″E		

Landing ground designations LG-187 to LG-200 were unused.

=== 201-251 ===
LG-number	Name	German name	Coordinate	Squadrons	Notes
LG-201	El Gamil		31°17′0″N 32°14′0″E		now Port Said Airport
LG-202	El Cap		30°56′0″N 32°18′0″E	208	
LG-203	Ballah		30°44′5″N 32°16′0″E		
LG-204	Ismailia		30°36′5″N 32°15′0″E		now Ismailia Air Base
LG-206	Abu Sueir North		30°34′0″N 32°06′0″E	203	
LG-207	El Qassasin		30°36′N 32°01′E; 30°35′30″N 32°00′15″E	55, 203, 223, 318 & 450	
LG-208	Bilbeis (Mahsma)		30°25′0″N 31°36′0″E	459	now Bilbays Air Base
LG-209	Deversoir (Suez Road No.2) (Kilo 61)		30°25′0″N 32°20′0″E	55 & 223	now Abu Sultan Air Base
LG-210	El Firdam		30°37′5″N 32°15′5″E		
LG-211	Fayid		30°19′49″N 32°16′11″E		now Fayid Air Base
LG-212	Kasfareet		30°15′5″N 32°25′0″E		
LG-213	Kabrit		30°15′0″N 32°29′0″E		now Kibrit Air Base
LG-214	Shandur		30°11′0″N 32°32′0″E		
LG-215	Shallufa		30°03′5″N 32°32′5″E		
LG-216	Suez		29°59′0″N 32°33′0″E		
LG-217	Suez Road No. 4		30°04′0″N 32°02′0″E		
LG-218	Heliopolis		30°06′0″N 31°19′0″E		
LG-219	Matariyah (Payne) (Kilo 8)		30°08′0″N 31°24′0″E	73, 127, 137, 213, 336, 601 & 680	now Cairo International Airport
LG-220	El Khanka		30°11′50″N 31°22′04″E	213, 216, 272 & 274	
LG-221	Helwan		29°50′0″N 31°19′0″E		
LG-222	Fayoum Road (Kilo 17)		29°51′0″N 31°04′0″E	40, 46 & 134	
LG-223	El Rus Wasta	El Rus	29°21′0″N 31°05′0″E; 29°21′0″N 31°05′10″E		
LG-224	Cairo West Air Base (Kilo 26)	Gebel el mansuriya	30°07′0″N 30°55′0″E; 30°07′15″N 30°54′45″E	14, 37, 39, 46, 70, 76, 104, 267, 450 & 454	
LG-225	El Teiriya		30°37′0″N 30°42′0″E		
LG-226	Gianaclis		30°54′0″N 30°06′0″E	38, 203 & 459	
LG-227	Maryut		31°10′0″N 29°57′0″E	47, 203, 454 & 459	
LG-228	Nekhl		29°53′0″N 33°45′0″E		
LG-229	Idku		31°16′5″N 30°14′5″E	274	
LG-230	Ras Gharib		28°19′5″N 33°06′0″E		
LG-231	Hurghada Abu Mingar		27°10′0″N 33°49′0″E		
LG-233	Luxor	Luxor	25°41′0″N 32°42′0″E; 25°40′30″N 32°42′20″E		
LG-234	Abu Zenima		29°03′0″N 33°06′0″E		
LG-235	HMS Grebe		31°08′0″N 29°48′0″E		
LG-236	El Arish		31°04′0″N 33°50′0″E		
LG-237	Landing Ground 237 (Kilo 40)		30°10′5″N 30°48′5″E	40, 104, 108, 148, 462	
LG-238	Ras El Bar	El Malaqa	31°31′5″N 31°50′0″E		
LG-239	Safaga new		26°48′0″N 33°56′0″E		
LG-240	Abu Zenima South		28°58′5″N 33°13′0″E		
LG-241	Zafarana		29°06′0″N 32°39′0″E		
LG-242	Landing Ground 242		29°19′0″N 31°05′0″E		
LG-243	Samalut		28°18′0″N 30°36′0″E		
LG-245	Almaza		30°05′5″N 31°21′5″E		
LG-246	Edfu		24°59′0″N 32°54′0″E		
LG-247	El-Tor		28°13′5″N 33°38′0″E		
LG-248	Assiut		27°09′5″N 31°00′0″E		
LG-249	Aswan	Assuan	24°03′0″N 32°54′5″E		
LG-251	Shallufa Satellite		30°06′5″N 32°31′0″E	221	

== Other landing grounds ==
Evidently assigned by other commands:

LG-number	Name	German name	Coordinate	RAF Squadrons	Notes
LG 416	Deir ez-Zor Airport		35°17′0″N 40°11′0″E		
LG 426	Palmyra Airport		34°33′5″N 38°18′0″E		
LG 500	—		33°07′0″N 41°25′0″E		
LG 504	Ain Zalah				
LG 549	Baghdad West		33°15′45″N 44°14′04″E		
LG 589	H-2 Air Base		32°55′46″N 039°44′38″E		
LG 598	Kufra West		24°08′0″N 22°58′0″E		

- Bir Terfawi 22°55′0″N 28°53′0″E
- Eight Bells Hills 22°46′59″N 26°16′12″E
- Big Carin 26°28′10″N 25°01′22″E

== Airfields in Palestine Mandate ==
Airfield	Years active	Location	Fate
RAF Muqeible	1917-42	32°30′11″N 035°17′21″E	Disused
RAF St Jean	1942	32°56′32.81″N 035°06′30.60″E	Disused
RAF Aqir	1939-48	31°50′22.10″N 34°49′18.64″E	Tel Nof Airbase
RAF Ein Shemer	1942-48	32°26′12.9″N 35°0′2.15″E	Ein Shemer Airfield
RAF Gaza	1917-46	31°28′41″N 34°29′40″E	Disused
RAF Haifa	1931-48	32°48′34″N 35°02′35″E	Haifa Airport
RAF Lydda	1938-48	32°00′41″N 034°53′18″E	Lod Airbase then Ben Gurion Airport
RAF Petah Tiqva	1941-48	32°04′0″N 34°56′0″E	Disused
RAF Qastina	1942-48	31°45′45.00″N 34°43′38.00″E	Hatzor Airbase
RAF Ramat David	1941-48	32°39′59.77″N 035°10′59.97″E	Ramat David Airbase
RAF Ramleh	1918-47	31°55′01″N 34°52′23″E	Disused
Sde Dov Airport	1938-2019	32°6′38.99″N 34°46′46.01″E	Disused
RAF Beit Daras	1941-49	31°44′12″N 34°41′54″E	Disused
RAF El Bassa		33°04′16″N 35°07′25″E	Betzet
RAF Machanaim	1943-48	32°58′51″N 35°34′18″E	Rosh Pina Airport
RAF Megiddo		32°35′50″N 35°13′43″E	Megiddo Airfield
RAF Amman		31°58′19″N 35°59′24″E	Amman Civil Airport, Jordan
RAF Mafraq	1920-1957	32°21′31″N 36°15′07″E	King Hussein Air Base, Jordan
RAF Zerqa		32°6′22″N 36°9′36″E	Dawsons Field, Jordan

== See also ==
- Colonial aviation in Africa
- Desert Air Force
- Advanced Landing Ground
- List of former Royal Air Force stations
- List of Royal Air Force aircraft squadrons
- Western Desert Campaign
- Operation Crusader
- First Battle of El Alamein
- Frontier Wire (Libya)
- Long Range Desert Group
- Tragedy at Kufra
