= No. 37 Squadron RAF =

Defunct flying squadron of the Royal Air Force

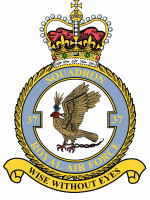
- Active: 15 April 1916 – May 1916, 15 September 1916 – 1 July 1919, 26 April 1937 – 31 March 1946, 15 April 1946 – 1 April 1947, 14 September 1947 – 7 September 1967
- Country: United Kingdom
- Motto: "Wise without eyes"
- Battle honours: Home Defence, 1916–18*: Norway 1940: Dunkirk*: Channel & North Sea, 1939–40: Fortress Europe, 1940*: Malta, 1940–42*: Greece, 1941*: El Alamein*: Italy, 1943–45*: South-East Europe, 1943–45* Honours marked with an asterisk are those emblazoned on the Squadron Standard

Insignia
- Squadron badge heraldry: A hawk hooded, belled and fessed, wings elevated and addorsed
- Squadron codes: 37 April 1937 – April 1939; FJ April 1939 – September 1939; LF September 1939 – March 1946

No. 37 Squadron was a Royal Flying Corps (RFC) fighter squadron during the First World War, a Royal Air Force bomber squadron during the Second World War, and performed maritime reconnaissance in the years 1947–67.

== History ==
=== First World War ===
No. 37 Squadron of the Royal Flying Corps was formed at RFC Orfordness, Suffolk, on 15 April 1916 as an experimental squadron, but it was disbanded a month later when it was absorbed back into the experimental station at Orfordness. On 15 September of that year, it was re-formed, with its headquarters at Woodham Mortimer, and detachments at Rochford, Stow Maries and Goldhanger, all in Essex. The squadron operated a mixture of aircraft, including B.E.2s, B.E.12s and F.E.2bs. Its responsibilities included defending London against aerial attack, both by German Zeppelins at night and by aircraft during the day.

As a result of the start of large-scale attacks by German Gotha bombers, the squadron received several Sopwith 1½ Strutters in May 1917, with better performance than its existing aircraft, which struggled to catch the Gothas, and Sopwith Pup fighters were also received to counter the Gothas, although by August, the Pups had been withdrawn to form new Home Defence squadrons. On the night of 16/17 June 1917, one of the squadron's B.E.12s, flown by Lieutenant Pierce Watkins, attacked the Zeppelin L48, which caught fire and crashed. While the airship was also attacked almost simultaneously by an F.E.2 and a DH.2 from the Orfordness experimental station, Watkin was officially given sole credit for shooting down L48. In August the squadron (together with 50 Squadron) experimented with using radio equipped B.E.12s to report on the movements of enemy aircraft, to allow the daytime Gotha raids to be tracked.

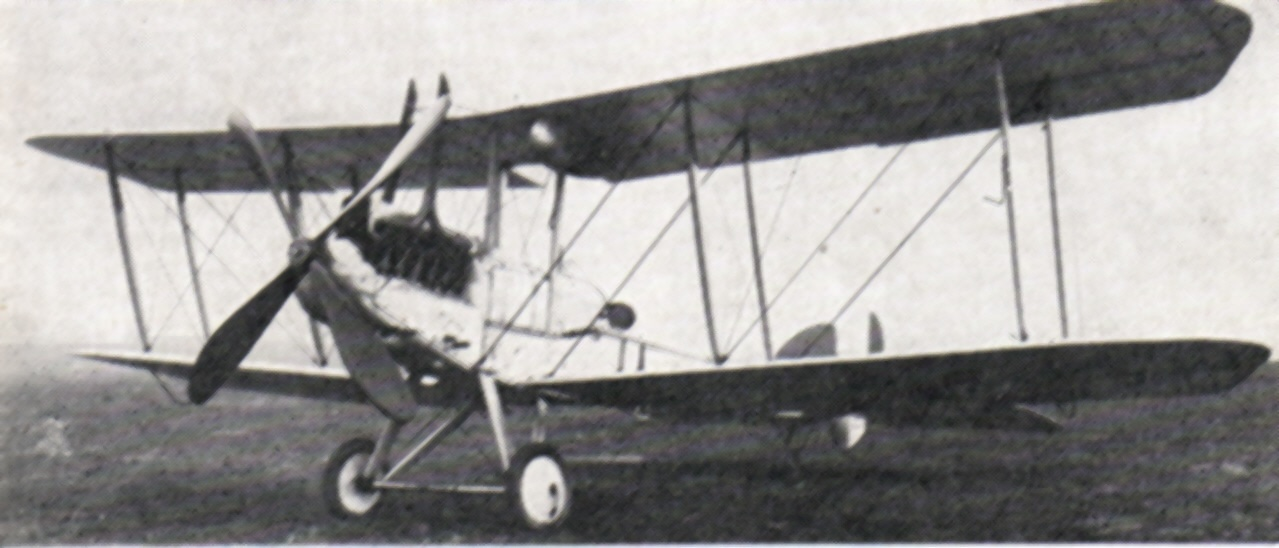
Royal Aircraft Factory B.E.12, circa 1916

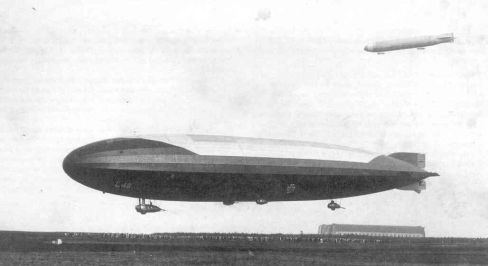
Zeppelin L 48, shot down by a 37 sqdn B.E.12 flown by Lt. Watkins, 1917

The squadron became part of the new Royal Air Force on 1 April 1918. As it was assigned to patrol to the north of London where attacks were less likely, it retained its obsolete B.E.12s well into 1918, receiving its first modern S.E.5s in May. In October 1918, the squadron re-equipped with Sopwith Camels and in December replaced these by Sopwith Snipes. The squadron moved to Biggin Hill in March 1919 and in July 1919 it was renumbered as No. 39 Squadron RAF.

=== Bomber squadron ===
In April 1937, the squadron was re-formed as No. 37 (Bomber) Squadron at RAF Feltwell in Norfolk, East Anglia from a nucleus provided by No. 214 Squadron RAF, equipped with the Handley Page Harrow heavy bomber. It re-equipped with Vickers Wellingtons in May 1939, retaining them at the outbreak of World War II, when it formed part of 3 Group. The squadron flew its first operational mission of the war on 3 September 1939, an unsuccessful armed reconnaissance mission by six Wellingtons to the Schillig Roads to search for German warships. On 18 December 1939, No. 37 Squadron contributed six aircraft to a sortie by 24 Wellingtons against shipping in the Heligoland Bight. The formation came under heavy attack by German fighters, with five out of 37 Squadron's six Wellingtons shot down, with 21 men killed. In total, twelve Wellingtons were shot down.

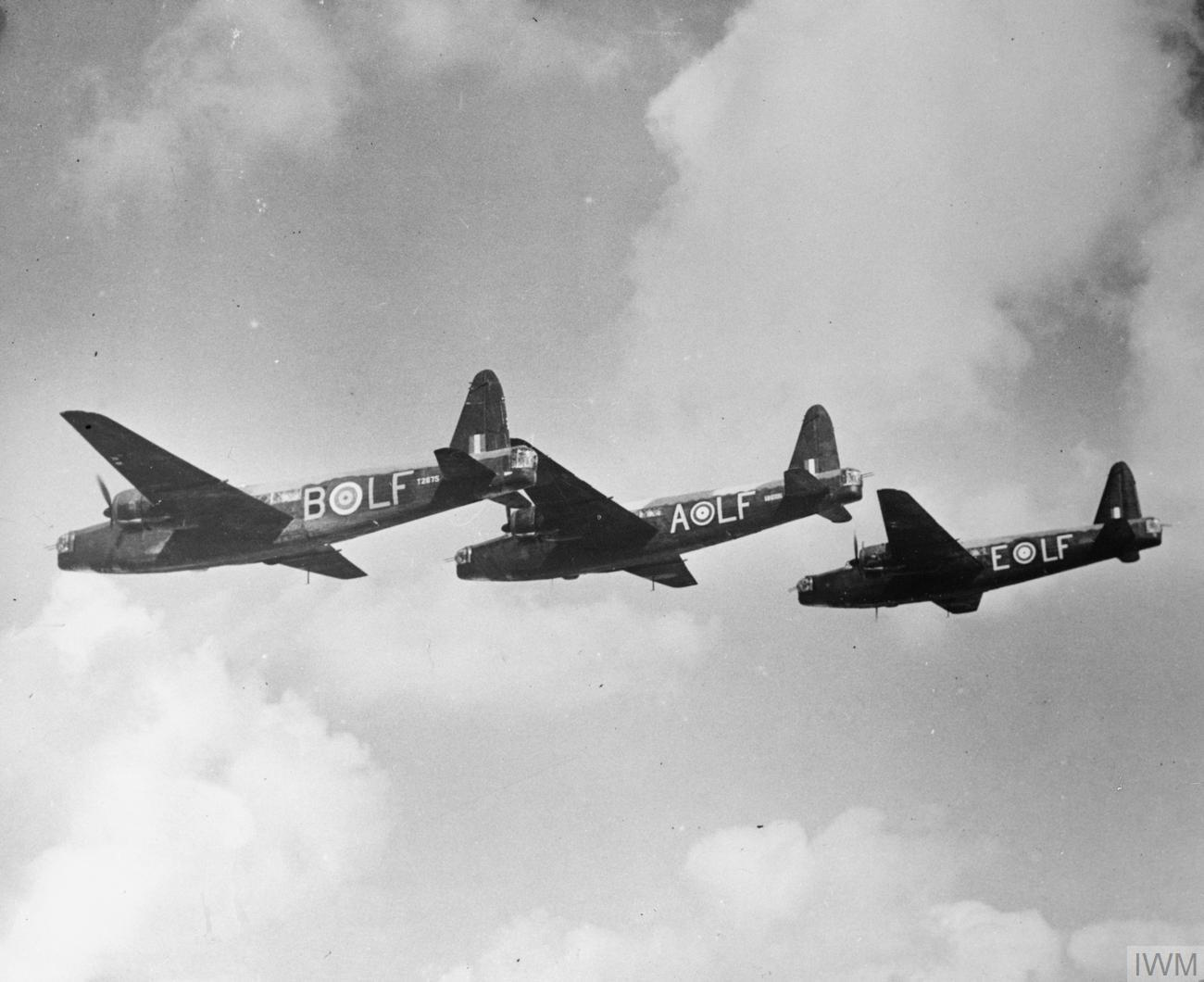
Three Vickers Wellington Mark ICs of No. 37 Squadron RAF based at Shallufa, Egypt, flying in formation, 1940–43

In November 1940, the squadron moved to the Middle East, with the squadron's aircraft being flown via Malta, from where they flew a few missions before arriving in Egypt on 14 November, with one of its crews claiming an Italian seaplane shot down on the ferry flight from Malta to Egypt. The squadrons ground crew were sent to Egypt by ship, being ferried from Gibraltar to Alexandria aboard the cruiser HMS Manchester, which took part in the Battle of Cape Spartivento on 27 November and came under air attack the next day before reaching Egypt and disembarking the squadron's personnel. The Wellingtons of 37 Squadron, together with the other two Egypt-based Wellington squadrons, 38 and 70 Squadrons, were deployed in support of Operation Compass, the British offensive against Italian forces in the Western Desert from 8/9 December, operating against airfields used by the Italians.

In February 1941 No. 37 Squadron was transferred to Greece to support Greek resistance to the Italian invasion. It was used to attack targets in Albania and Italy, and also for supply dropping to Greek troops. Following the German invasion of Greece in April 1941, the squadron's Wellingtons were used to carry out attacks on Bulgaria, but by 17 April the German advance forced the squadron to be evacuated back to Egypt. On 1 May 1941, a detachment of eight Wellingtons from No. 37 Squadron were deployed to RAF Aqir in Palestine as a response to Iraqi threats to the British airbase at Habbaniya, and the next day took part in bombing raids against Iraqi positions outside Habbaniya in the opening moves of the Anglo-Iraqi War. The detachment moved to Shaibah in Iraq later that day, and continued to raid Iraqi positions and airfields for the next few days. The remainder of the squadron, meanwhile, continued to fly raids against German and Italian airfields in southern Greece and the Dodecanese. The Iraqi-based detachment returned to Egypt on 12 May. Following the German invasion of Crete, the squadron flew in support of the defenders of the island until its fall. From 18 June the RAF's Egypt-based Wellington squadrons, including No. 37, carried out attacks on Aleppo and Beirut as part of the Syria–Lebanon campaign. The squadron continued to attack targets in Greece and North Africa (such as ports like Benghazi and Derna) and from November 1941, operated increasingly against airfields in preparation for Operation Crusader.

On 27 December 1941, as part of a re-organisation of the RAF's Egypt based-bomber force, No. 37 Squadron joined the newly established 231 (Bomber) Wing, based at RAF Shallufa and part of 205 Group. From January 1942, the squadron was reinforced by aircraft and aircrew from 458 Squadron RAAF, whose aircraft had been flown from the Britain to Egypt via Gibraltar and Malta and on arrival had been split between 37, 70, 104, 108 and 148 Squadrons. In February 1942, part of the squadron was detached to Malta, with six aircraft arriving at RAF Luqa on 21 February and seven more on 22 February. On the night of 1/2 March, Malta-based Wellingtons of the squadron attacked Tripoli harbour, hitting and damaging the 5324 GRT freighter Monginevro. On the night of 2/3 March, 10 of the Squadron's Wellingtons raided Palermo, sinking the 5945 GRT German freighter Rhur, and badly damaging the 6600 GRT German freighter Cuma, the Italian 5365 GRT steamer Securitas and the Italian torpedo boat Partenope. On 4 March, Cuma's cargo of ammunition exploded, sinking Cuma and Securitas and damaging many more ships. In total 42 vessels were sunk or damaged during the raid on 2/3 March or the explosion on 4 March. Losses were heavy, however, and by 18 March the detachment had been virtually wiped out by German attacks and accidents. Only one Wellington was still airworthy and could be flown back to Egypt. In April that year the squadron was forward deployed to LG-09, (between El Daba and Fuka) to reduce the range to the squadron's main targets, but the advance of German and Italian forces after the Battle of Gazala forced the squadron to be withdrawn to the Nile Delta in June. During the Second Battle of El Alamein, the British bomber force, including 37 Squadron, continued to attack the key port of Tobruk as a priority, while also attacking enemy airfields and concentrations of troops and vehicles on the El Alamein battlefield. After the Allied victory in the battle, the squadron was moved westwards to aid attacks on the supply lines of the retreating German and Italian forces, moving first to El Daba and then in late November to Kambut in Eastern Libya.

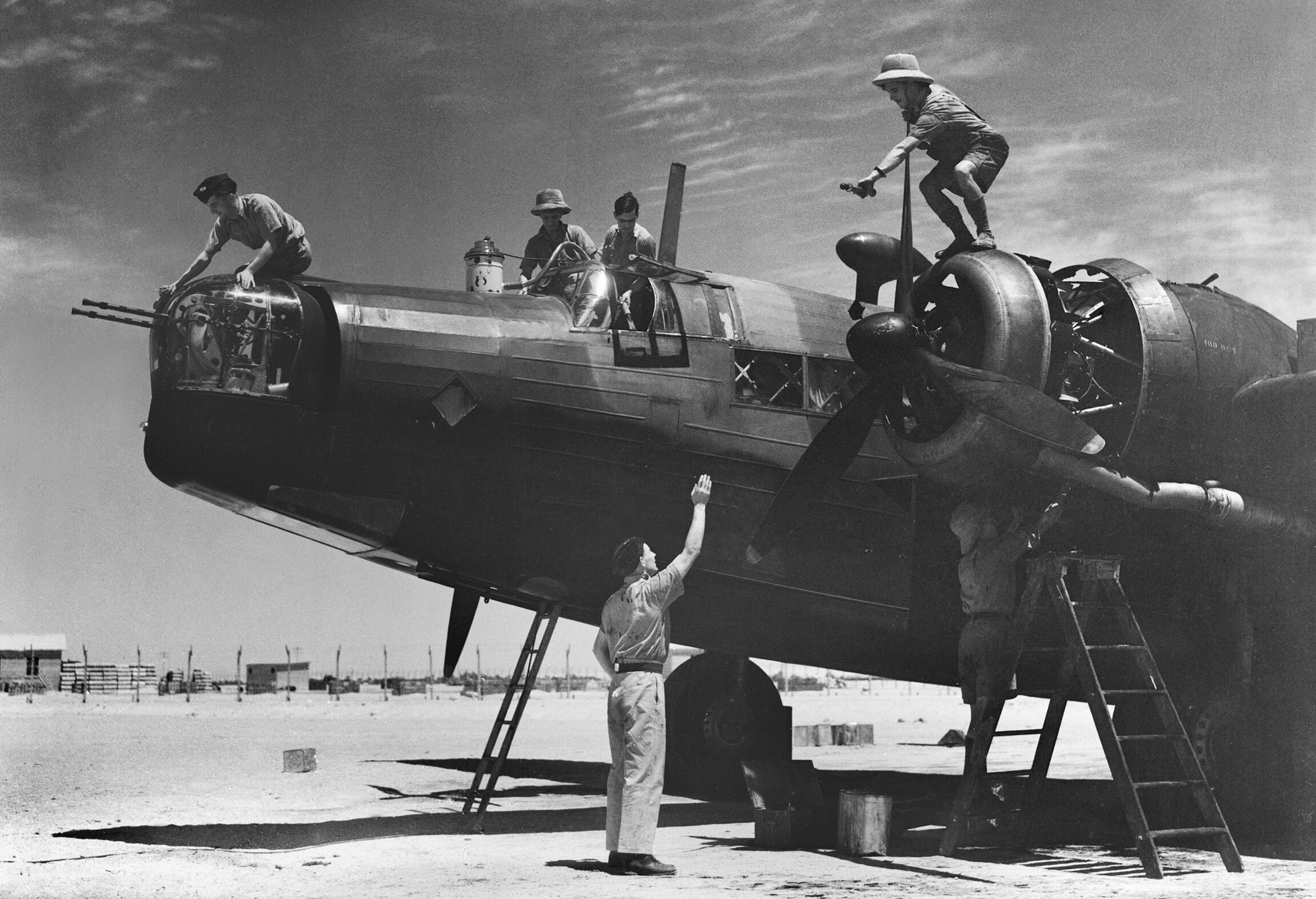
Groundcrew servicing a Vickers Wellington Mark IC at Shallufa, Egypt, 1940–43

In February 1943, the squadron moved to Gardabia in Tunisia, replacing its elderly Wellington Ic aircraft with more powerful and better performing Wellington Xs. On 18 February, 37 Squadron, together with most of the rest of the RAF's night bomber force in the Mediterranean and American day bombers, joined the newly established Northwest African Strategic Air Force. While designated as a Strategic force, the distance to strategic targets from the airfields in North Africa meant that they were at first mainly employed on tactical operations. The squadron flew operations against targets in Sicily during the Allied invasion of that island in July–August 1943.

In December 1943, the squadron moved to southern Italy, settling at Foggia Tortorella (Foggia 2) later that month, sharing the base with USAAF B17 Fortresses of the 99th Bombardment Group. The Wellingtons were replaced by Consolidated Liberators from November 1944, with the squadron flying its last mission with Wellingtons on 13 December 1944. Operations included bombing raids against targets in Northern Italy and the Balkans, together with supply drops to Yugoslav Partisans and dropping mines on the River Danube to disrupt German shipping. No. 37 Squadron flew its last missions of the Second World War on the night of 25/26 April 1945, against marshalling yards North West of Salzburg, Austria.

As part of a complex sequence of consolidation after the war, No. 37 Squadron moved to Aqir on 2 October 1945, moving again to Shallufa in Egypt in December, disbanding there on 31 March 1946. Meanwhile 614 Squadron, flying Handley Page Halifax and B-24 Liberators from Amendola Airfield, Italy, was disbanded, with elements of it temporarily renumbered as 214 Squadron (flying Lancasters from RAF Fayid in Egypt), until it was reconstituted again, as No. 37 Squadron on 15 April 1946. This version of No. 37 Squadron was disbanded just 12 months later on 1 April 1947.

=== Maritime reconnaissance ===
The squadron reformed again at Ein Shemer Airfield in Palestine on 14 September 1947, as a maritime reconnaissance squadron equipped with Lancaster GR3s and with responsibility for patrols over the Eastern Mediterranean, and in particular the location of ships carrying Jewish illegal immigrants to Palestine. In May 1948, at the time of the British withdrawal from Palestine, the squadron moved to RAF Luqa in Malta, coming under the control of AHQ Malta.

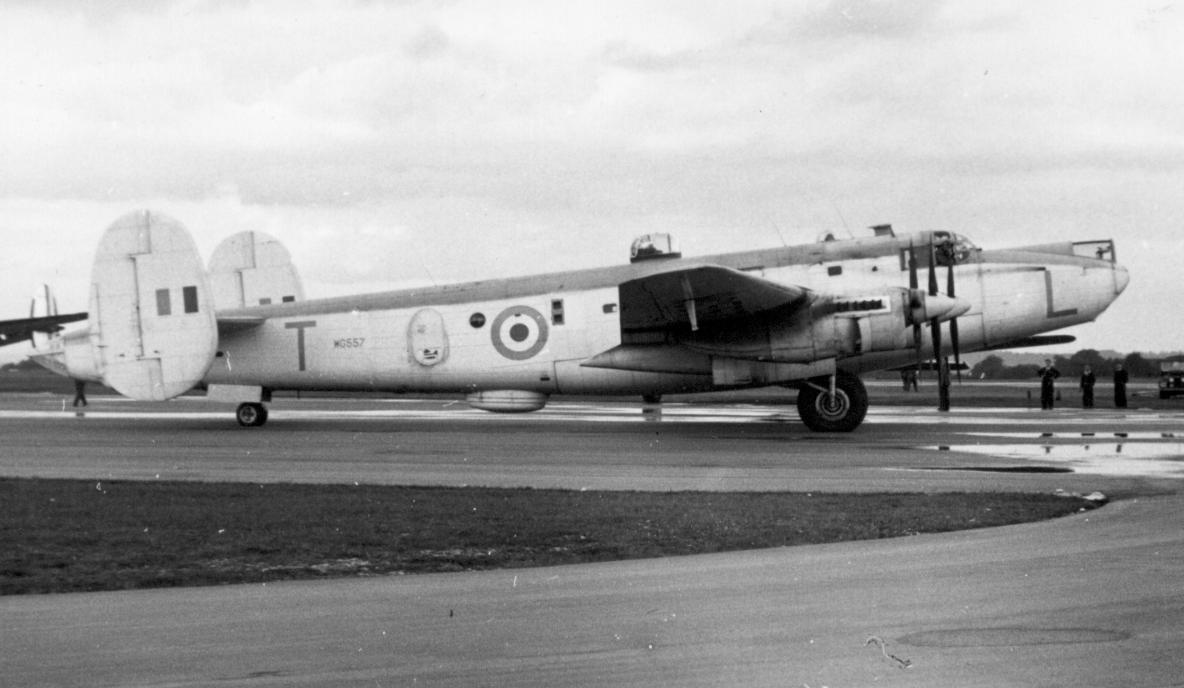
Avro Shackleton MR.2, 1955

In May–August 1953 the squadron replaced its Lancasters with Avro Shackleton MR.2s. It flew in support of the Anglo-French invasion of Egypt in 1956 (the Suez Crisis), and in July 1957 the squadron moved to RAF Khormaksar in Aden, for patrols over the Red Sea and Indian Ocean, with a secondary role of air support, including bombing fortified positions and strafing using the Shackleton's nose-mounted guns in counterinsurgency operations during the Aden Emergency. A detachment was based at Bahrain in an attempt to stop gun running from Oman. In 1961 the squadron flew in support of Operation Vantage, the British response to Iraqi threats against Kuwait, and from 1966, as a result of Rhodesia's Unilateral Declaration of Independence, supplied regular detachments to Mahajanga in Madagascar as part of the Beira Patrol, a British blockade of ships carrying oil to Rhodesia via Mozambique. No. 37 Squadron disbanded at Khormaksar on 7 September 1967.

The colours of No. 37 Squadron are in All Saints' Church, Stamford.

== See also ==
- London Air Defence Area
