= Y18 =

Y18 may refer to:

== Train stations ==
- Hōzanji Station, in Ikoma, Nara, Japan
- Kishinosato Station, in Nishinari-ku, Osaka, Japan
- Motoyama Station (Mitoyo), in Mitoyo, Kagawa, Japan
- Nigata Station, in Kure, Hiroshima, Japan
- Touqianzhuang metro station, in Taipei, Taiwan
- Yūrakuchō Station, in Chiyoda, Tokyo, Japan

== Other uses ==
- Y-18 Le Vallon Advanced Landing Ground in France
- Youth Bandy World Championship
