= No. 458 Squadron RAAF =

Royal Australian Air Force squadron

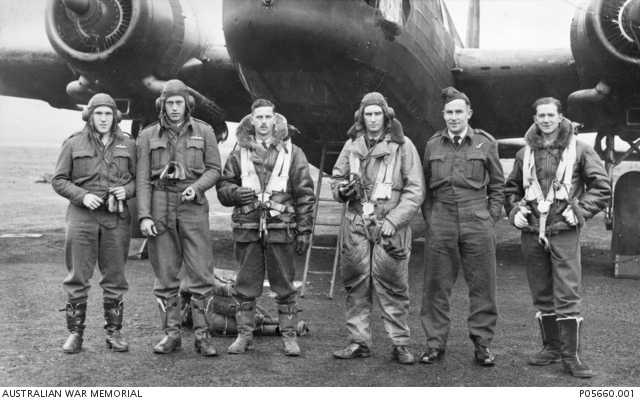
- Crew from No. 458 Squadron in front of their aircraft, December 1941
- Active: 8 July 1941 – 9 June 1945
- Country: Australia
- Allegiance: United Kingdom
- Branch: Royal Australian Air Force
- Role: Bomber; Maritime patrol
- Part of: No. 1 Group RAF, Bomber Command; RAF Middle East Command
- Mottos: We find and destroy
- Battle honours: Fortress Europe, 1940–1944; France and Germany, 1944–1945; South-East Europe, 1942–1945; Mediterranean, 1940–1943; Sicily, 1943; Italy, 1943–1945

Insignia
- Squadron Codes: FU (Sep 1941 – Mar 1942); MD (Oct 1942 – Apr 1943)

Aircraft flown
- Bomber: Vickers Wellington

No. 458 Squadron RAAF was a Royal Australian Air Force squadron that operated during World War II. It was formed in Australia under Article XV of the Empire Air Training Scheme. The squadron flew various versions of Vickers Wellington bombers, first in Europe and later in the Middle East. It was disbanded in mid-1945, following the conclusion of hostilities in Europe.

== History ==
=== Over Europe ===
No. 458 Squadron was formed at Williamtown, New South Wales, on 8 July 1941 as an Article XV squadron under the terms of the Empire Air Training Scheme. Consisting of only ground staff, the squadron departed for the United Kingdom in August to join other personnel assembled at RAF Holme-on-Spalding Moor, where the squadron was officially established as No. 458 (Bomber) Squadron on 25 August 1941. From the outset, the squadron drew personnel from many different countries, with many coming from Britain, Canada and New Zealand, as well as Australia.

Equipped with Wellington Mk.IV bombers, No. 458 Squadron formed part of No. 1 Group RAF of Bomber Command. It participated in its first operational sortie on 20/21 October, when ten of its aircraft joined in night attacks made against the ports of Emden, Antwerp and Rotterdam. Further attacks were made against industrial targets in France and Germany over the course of several months as part of a strategic bombing campaign. In addition, the Wellingtons were involved in mine-laying operations along enemy occupied coasts. In late 1941, No. 458 Squadron provided a flight to help raise the newly formed No. 460 Squadron RAAF. At the end of January 1942 the squadron was withdrawn from Bomber Command to serve in the Middle East.

=== Middle East and Mediterranean ===
The relocation to Middle East Command was, in the words of historian Steve Eather, "chaotic". Air and ground crews were separated as the latter went by sea, while the aircraft were flown out to the Middle East by their crews. While refuelling in Malta, many of the squadron's aircraft were re-allocated to other squadrons, and as a result many crews had to wait in Malta for transport on to Egypt. The move also resulted in the loss of the squadron's commanding officer, who was shot down by German aircraft while en route. It was May by the time that the ground crew reached Egypt, and when they arrived, many were re-allocated to other squadrons, and they too were re-allocated to various units, servicing a variety of aircraft from Royal Air Force and the United States Army Air Forces. Many of the aircrews suffered similarly, being temporarily detached to various squadrons including: Nos. 37, 70, 104, 108, and 148 Squadrons RAF.

On 1 September 1942, the No. 458 Squadron was re-constituted at Shallufa, in Egypt, and began a new life of maritime patrols, convoy escorts and mine laying operations, once again flying Wellington bombers. In this role, the squadron deployed a number of detachments to various locations around the Middle East. On 30 March 1943, No. 458 Squadron was transferred from El Shallufa to LG. 91, also in Egypt. They continued anti-shipping operations after this and in the middle of 1943 the squadron's crews were responsible for sinking or damaging many ships, including an Italian cruiser and a destroyer. In June, the squadron deployed to Tunisia. This was followed by a further move to Bone, in Algeria, in October 1943, from where further maritime operations were flown, including anti-submarine patrols, which resulted in several attacks. The squadron sank its first U-boat in mid-May, when U-731 was attacked by a Wellington based at Alghero, on Sardinia. In August, the squadron flew bombing missions in support of Operation Dragoon, in southern France. Further moves came in September 1944, with the squadron relocating to Foggia Airfield, in Italy, and deploying detachments to Falconara and Rosignano in Italy and La Vallon, in France.

The squadron's final move came on 26 January 1945 when it was re-established at RAF North Front, Gibraltar. As a result of the Allied liberation of France, and the continued advance of Allied forces in Italy, there were few targets for the squadron in the Mediterranean any more; as a result the squadron was re-tasked to patrol from Gibraltar across the western Atlantic to escort Allied convoys and search for German U-boats. These duties occupied the squadron until the end of the war in May 1945. No. 458 Squadron disbanded shortly thereafter on 9 June 1945 at Gibraltar. Losses during the war amounted to 141 personnel being killed, of whom 65 were Australian.

== Aircraft operated ==
No. 458 Squadron operated the following aircraft:

From	To	Aircraft	Version
August 1941	January 1942	Vickers Wellington	Mk.IV
February 1942	April 1942	Vickers Wellington	Mk.Ic
October 1942	November 1942	Vickers Wellington	Mk.Ic
October 1942	September 1943	Vickers Wellington	Mk.VIII
June 1943	May 1944	Vickers Wellington	Mk.XIII
February 1944	June 1945	Vickers Wellington	Mk.XIV

== Squadron bases ==
No. 458 Squadron operated from the following bases and airfields:

From	To	Base	Remark
8 July 1941	7 August 1941	Williamtown, New South Wales, Australia	
7 August 1941	25 August 1941	en route to the UK	
25 August 1941	February 1942	RAF Holme-on-Spalding Moor, Yorkshire	
February 1942	March 1942	en route to the Middle East	Dispersed upon arrival
1 September 1942	30 March 1943	Shallufa, Egypt	re-establishment
30 March 1943	18 June 1943	LG.91, Egypt	Dets. at RAF Luqa, Malta and Blida, Algeria
18 June 1943	9 October 1943	Protville I, Tunisia	
9 October 1943	25 March 1944	Bone Airfield, Algeria	Dets. at Blida, Algeria; RAF Luqa, Malta; Grottaglie Airfield, Italy; Ghisonaccia Airfield, Corsica; Borizzo Airfield, Sicily and Réghaïa, Algeria
25 March 1944	3 September 1944	Alghero Airfield, Sardinia	
3 September 1944	29 January 1945	Foggia Airfield, Italy	Dets. at Falconara Airfield, Italy; Rosignano Airfield, Italy and La Vallon Airfield, France
29 January 1945	9 June 1945	RAF North Front, Gibraltar	

== Commanding officers ==
No. 458 Squadron was commanded by the following officers:

From	To	Name
1 September 1941	15 February 1942 (MIA)	Wing Commander N.G. Mulholland, DFC
15 February 1942	1 June 1943	Squadron Leader L.L. Johnston
1 June 1943	27 September 1943	Lieutenant Colonel Bruce McKenzie SAAF)
27 September 1943	1 July 1944	Wing Commander J. Dowling
1 July 1944	9 June 1945	Wing Commander R.C. MacKay, DFC

== Notes ==
=== Bibliography ===
- Bowyer, Michael J.F.; Rawlings, John D.R. (1979). Squadron Codes, 1937–56. Cambridge, UK: Patrick Stephens. ISBN 0-85059-364-6.
- Delve, Ken (1994). The Source Book of the RAF. Shrewsbury, Shropshire, UK: Airlife Publishing. ISBN 1-85310-451-5.
- Eather, Steve (1995). Flying Squadrons of the Australian Defence Force. Weston Creek, Australian Capital Territory: Aerospace Publications. ISBN 1-875671-15-3.
- Flintham, Vic; Thomas, Andrew (2003). Combat Codes: A Full Explanation and Listing of British, Commonwealth and Allied Air Force Unit Codes Since 1938. Shrewsbury, Shropshire, UK: Airlife Publishing. ISBN 1-84037-281-8.
- Halley, James J. (1988). The Squadrons of the Royal Air Force & Commonwealth 1918–1988. Tonbridge, Kent, UK: Air Britain (Historians). ISBN 0-85130-164-9.
- Jefford, C.G. (2001). RAF Squadrons: A Comprehensive Record of the Movement and Equipment of all RAF Squadrons and Their Antecedents Since 1912. Shrewsbury, Shropshire, UK: Airlife Publishing. ISBN 1-84037-141-2.
- Moyes, Philip J.R. (1976) [1964]. Bomber Squadrons of the RAF and Their Aircraft. London: Macdonald and Jane's (Publishers). ISBN 0-354-01027-1.
- Rawlings, John D.R. (1982). Coastal, Support and Special Squadrons of the RAF and Their Aircraft. London: Jane's Publishing Company. ISBN 0-7106-0187-5.
