= No. 651 Squadron AAC =

No. 651 Squadron AAC No. 651 Squadron RAF
- Squadron badge
- Active: 1 August 1941 – 1 September 1957 (RAF); 1957 – present
- Country: United Kingdom
- Branch: British Army
- Type: Flying squadron
- Part of: 1 Regiment
- Motto(s): Dirige (Latin for 'Direct') – as in "direct towards/pointing the way"

Insignia
- Squadron badge heraldry: A seashell fired
- Squadron codes: MA (1944 – 45, HQ Flight); MB (1944 – 45, 'A' Flight); MC (1944 – 45, 'B' Flight); MD (1944 – 45, 'C' Flight)

No. 651 Squadron Army Air Corps, is an aircraft squadron of the British Army, originally formed as No. 651 Squadron Royal Air Force in Italy and North Africa during the Second World War, and afterwards in Egypt. Numbers 651 to 663 Squadrons of the RAF were air observation post units which had both Army and RAF personnel. The pilots, drivers and signallers were in the Royal Artillery whilst the adjutants, technical staff and equipment officers came from the RAF. Air observation posts were used primarily for artillery spotting, but occasionally for liaison and other duties. Their duties and squadron numbers were transferred to the Army with the formation of the Army Air Corps on 1 September 1957.

== History ==
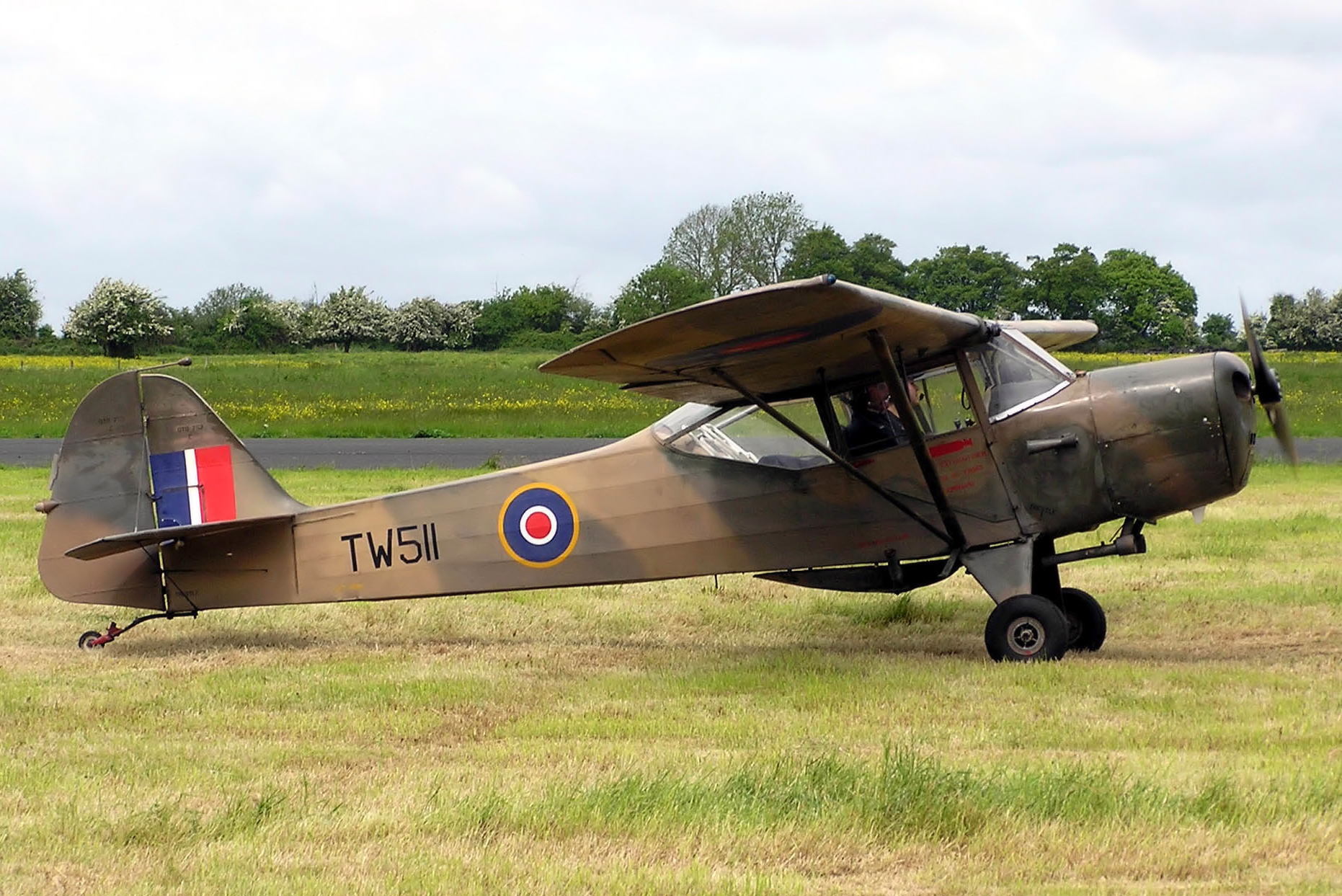
An Auster AOP.5

No 651 Squadron was formed at RAF Old Sarum, Wiltshire, on 1 August 1941. It went into action in November 1942, during Operation Torch in North Africa. It later served in North Africa, Italy and finally Egypt from 1945 where it remained until 1 November 1955. On that same day, No. 657 Squadron RAF was re-numbered to 651 Squadron at RAF Middle Wallop, it now flew Sycamore helicopters as well as Austers.

No. 1908 Independent Air Observation Post Flight was formed within 651 Squadron previously 'A' Flight along with No. 1909 Air Observation Post Flight which was formed within 651 Squadron previously 'B' Flight.

On 1 September 1957, the squadron was transferred to the Army Air Corps and became No. 651 Squadron AAC.

On 1 April 2019, 651 Squadron and its aircraft, the Britten-Norman Defender and Britten-Norman BN-2 Islander, were transferred to the Royal Air Force as part of ISTAR Force in No. 1 Group based at RAF Waddington. 651 Squadron continued to operate the aircraft until they were retired from service on 30 June 2021. On 1 August 2021, 651 Squadron transferred back to the Army as part of 1 Regiment AAC.

== Aircraft operated ==
Aircraft operated by no. 651 Squadron RAF, data from
From	To	Aircraft	Variant
August 1941	July 1942	Taylorcraft	Plus C
September 1941	October 1941	Taylorcraft	Plus D
October 1941	December 1941	Stinson Vigilant	Mk.I
February 1942	September 1942	Taylorcraft	Plus C.2
July 1942	October 1943	Auster	Mk.I
August 1943	December 1944	Auster	Mk.III
May 1944	October 1945	Auster	Mk.IV
December 1944	June 1947	Auster	Mk.V
November 1949	February 1952	Auster	Mk.V
March 1947	October 1955	Auster	AOP.6
November 1949	March 1952	Auster	AOP.5
November 1955	September 1957	Bristol Sycamore	HC.11
November 1955	September 1957	Auster	AOP.6

== Airfields used ==
UK
Base	Arrival	Notes	Next Base	Arrival	Notes	Next Base	Arrival	Notes	Next Base	Arrival	Notes
RAF Old Sarum	1 August 1941	Formed	RAF Dumfries	31 July 1942		RAF Kidsdale	11 August 1942		Gourock	30 October 1942	En route to North Africa

North Africa (Algeria, Tunisia and Libya)
Base	Arrival	Notes	Next Base	Arrival	Notes	Next Base	Arrival	Notes	Next Base	Arrival	Notes
Algiers	13 November 1942	Algeria	RAF Bone	17 November 1942	Algeria	Béja	11 December 1942	Tunisia	Souk el Arba	12 January 1943	Tunisia
Medjez el Bab	19 April 1943	Tunisia	La Marsa	14 May 1943	Tunisia	Sfax	22 May 1943	Tunisia	Sousse	25 May 1943	Tunisia
RAF Castel Benito	4 June 1943	Libya	Sousse	9 June 1943	Tunisia						

Italy and Austria
Base	Arrival	Notes	Next Base	Arrival	Notes	Next Base	Arrival	Notes	Next Base	Arrival	Notes
Syracuse	19 July 1943	Sicily	Lentinti	14 August 1943	Italy	3727N 1500E	5 August 1943	Italy	Lentinti	14 August 1943	Italy
Scordia	1 September 1943	Sicily	Vibo Valentine	17 September 1943	Italy	Firmo	21 September 1943	Italy	Gioia del Colle	24 September 1943	Italy
Altamura	27 September 1943	Italy	Canosa	30 September 1943	Italy	San Severo	2 October 1943	Italy	Torremaggiore	10 October 1943	Italy
Serracapriola	1 November 1943	Italy	Vastro	8 November 1943	Italy	Bari	7 March 1944	Italy	Paglieta	6 April 1944	Italy
San Vito	9 June 1944	Italy	Roseto degli Abruzzi	20 June 1944	Italy	Torre de Palme	23 June 1944	Italy	Fermo	29 June 1944	Italy
Recanati	3 July 1944	Italy	San Bernadino	21 July 1944	Italy	Monte Marciano	29 July 1944	Italy	Fabriano	19 August 1944	Italy
Pergola	25 August 1944	Italy	Fossombrone	29 August 1944	Italy	Morciano	5 September 1944	Italy	Serravalle	25 September 1944	Italy
4402N 1230E	4 October 1944	Italy	Santa Arcangelo	15 October 1944	Italy	Cesena	29 October 1944	Italy	Forlì	16 November 1944	Italy
Porto San Elpidio	24 January 1945	Italy	Forlì	28 February 1945	Italy	Villa Broochi	6 March 1945	Italy	4428N 1214E	31 March 1945	Italy
4424N 1202E	12 April 1945	Italy	4431N 1204E	15 April 1945	Italy	Montesanto	24 April 1945	Italy	Ferrara	27 April 1945	Italy
Padua	1 May 1945	Italy	Udine	4 May 1945	Italy	Klagenfurt	10 May 1945	Austria			

Middle East
Base	Arrival	Notes	Next Base	Arrival	Notes	Next Base	Arrival	Notes	Next Base	Arrival	Notes
Gorizia	7 October 1945	Italy	RAF Aboukir	9 November 1945	Egypt	RAF Ismailia	10 November 1945	Egypt	RAF Ramleh	2 February 1946	Mandatory Palestine
RAF Petah Tikva	10 July 1946	Mandatory Palestine	RAF Qastina	1 June 1947	Mandatory Palestine	RAF Petah Tikva	11 February 1948	Mandatory Palestine	Sarafand	28 April 1948	Mandatory Palestine
RAF Fayid	12 May 1948	Egypt	RAF Castel Benito	26 August 1948	Libya	RAF Ismailia	15 November 1951	Egypt		Disbanded	1 November 1955

Back in the UK
Base	Arrival	Notes	Next Base	Arrival	Notes
RAF Middle Wallop	1 November 1955	Reformed	RAF Feltwell	4 April 1957	Disbanded - 1 September 1957.

== Army Air Corps ==
- Locations and notes: Formerly No. 651 Light Aircraft Squadron AAC
- RAF Feltwell (1958)
  RAF Debden (- 1 Mar 1961)
  Middle Wallop (1960 - 64)
  RAF Nicosia (1964)
  Middle Wallop (1964 - 66

== See also ==
- List of Army Air Corps aircraft units
- List of Royal Air Force aircraft squadrons
