= RAF Gambut =

Abandoned military airfields in Libya

RAF Gambut
- Kambut in Libya
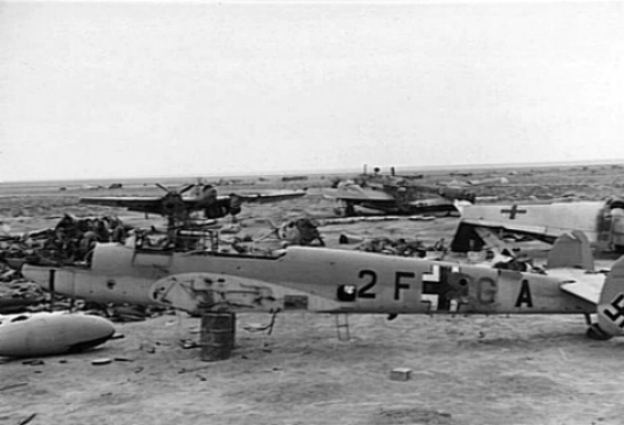
- Abandoned German aircraft at Gambut after its recapture by the Allies (December 1941)

Site information
- Operator: Luftwaffe (1941–1942); Regia Aeronautica (1939-1942); Royal Air Force (1942–1944); United States Army Air Forces
- Controlled by: Ninth Air Force (1942–43)

Location
- Location in Libya RAF Gambut (Mediterranean)
- Coordinates: 31°57′04″N 024°30′14″E

Site history
- In use: 1941–1944
- Battles/wars: World War II: Western Desert campaign

RAF Gambut (or RAF Kambut) is a complex of six abandoned military airfields in Libya, located about 5 kilometres (3 mi) north-northeast of the village of Kambut, and 50 kilometres (31 mi) east-south-east of Tobruk. During World War II, the complex was an important facility, used by the Royal Air Force and many RAF squadrons were temporarily based there.

== History ==
Gambut was an airfield of Regia Aeronautica. Axis forces re-captured Gambut on 17 June 1941, after the Battle of Tobruk. This was a significant blow to the Allies as the airfield had been used to provide air-support to the Allied forces in the Siege of Tobruk. The airfield saw use by the Luftwaffe until its recapture by the New Zealand 4th Infantry Brigade on 25 November.

Today the remains of the airfields – deteriorating under the desert sands – are no longer visible on aerial photographs.

== Airfields at Gambut ==
This station consisted of six airfields known as Gambut 1 (LG139), this being the main airfield, Gambut 2 (LG142), Gambut 3 (LG143), Gambut West/Gambut 4 (LG156), Gambut 5 (LG159) and Gambut 6 (LG158).

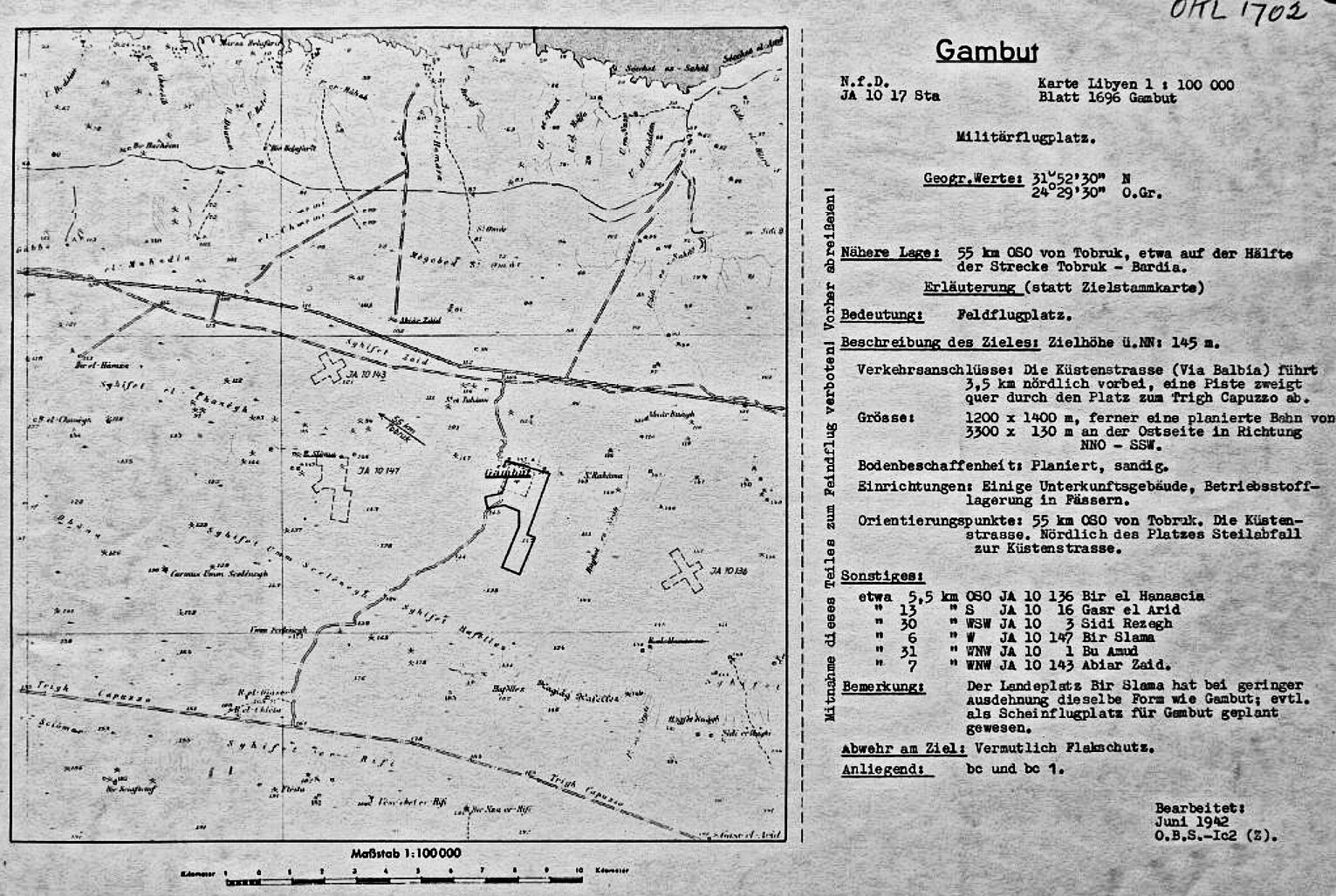
Captured 1942 German Luftwaffe map of the airfield complex

RAF Designation	No. Designation	Location
Gambut Main (No.1)	LG-139	31°52′5″N 24°29′5″E
Gambut No. 2	LG-142	31°51′5″N 24°32′5″E
Gambut No. 3	LG-143	31°50′5″N 24°36′5″E
Gambut Comms No. 4	LG-156	31°54′0″N 24°25′5″E
Gambut No. 5	LG-159	31°52′0″N 24°25′5″E
Gambut No. 6	LG-158	31°50′0″N 24°39′0″E

== Major units assigned ==
Commonwealth air forces (RAF except where stated.)

Gambut Main (No.1)

Units

- Squadrons

6, 11, 14, 33, 38, 45, 46, 47 55, 73, 80, 84 108, 112, 113, 145, 148, 162, 203, 208, 227, 229, 237, 238, 250, 252, 274, 294, 450 (RAAF), 454 (RAAF)

- HQ, 239 Wing (1 Mar – 17 Jun 1942, 14–15 Nov 1942)
- HQ, 243 Wing (May – 20 Jun 1942)
- HQ, 233 Wing (14–18 Nov 1942)
- HO, 223 Wing (SAAF)

Gambut (No.2)

Units

- Squadrons

73, 112, 250, 274, 450 (RAAF)

- HQ, 233 Wing (22 May – 28 Jun 1942)

Gambut (No.3)

Units

- Squadrons

14, 73, 117, 250, 294, 454 (RAAF), 459 (RAAF), 603

- HQ, 235 Wing (3 Dec 1942 – 29 Feb 1944)

Gambut West

Units

- Squadrons

73, 92, 145, 208, 213, 238, 601

- HQ, 285 Wing (14–20 Nov 1942)

United States Army Air Forces

- 12th Bombardment Group (North American B-25 Mitchell)
  - 434th Bombardment Squadron 17 December 1942 – 16 February 1943
- 93d Bombardment Group 16–25 February 1943 (Consolidated B-24 Liberator)
  - 409th Bombardment Squadron 16 Dec 1942 – 25 February 1943
- 376th Bombardment Group 10–25 February 1943 (B-24 Liberator)
- 57th Fighter Group 13–20 November 1942 (Curtiss P-40 Warhawk)

== See also ==
- List of North African airfields during World War II
