= RAF Shallufa =

Former Royal Air Force base in Egypt

RAF Shallufa
- قاعدة شلوفة الجوية
- Shallufa, Suez Governorate in Egypt
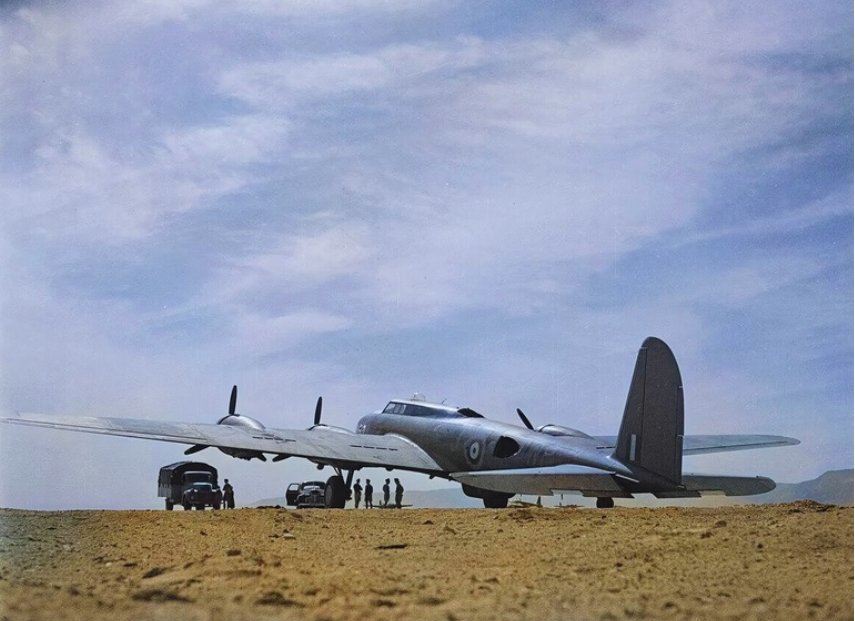
- Boeing Fortress I, 1941.

Site information
- Owner: Air Ministry
- Operator: Royal Air Force
- Controlled by: Near East Air Force

Location
- Shown within Egypt
- Coordinates: 30°03′10″N 32°32′30″E

Site history
- Built: 1918; 108 years ago
- In use: 1918 - 1955
- Battles/wars: Mediterranean and Middle East theatre of World War II

Airfield information
Runways
Direction	Length and surface
N/S	2,273 metres (7,457 ft) Asphalt
NW/SE	1,371 metres (4,498 ft) Asphalt
NE/SW	1,143 metres (3,750 ft) Asphalt
E/W	1,143 metres (3,750 ft) Asphalt

Royal Air Force Shallufa or more commonly RAF Shallufa (LG-215) is a former Royal Air Force station located in Suez Governorate, Egypt.

== History ==
In 1918, Shallufa Aerodrome was established. It was placed under the Disposal and Liquidation Commission on 4 July, 1922. It was also named Armament Training Station. At the outbreak of World War II in Egypt, Shallufa Aerodrome was opened as a RAF station on 22 January, 1940, gaining the title RAF Shallufa. It was closed and reopened numerously, which included closure on 30 January, 1942, and reopening on 20 May, 1943. The station was place under administration by the No. 203 Group RAF beginning in 20 May of that year. On 1 December, 1944, the station was closed, and was reopened on 15 February, 1945. On 15 September, 1945, station was placed under administration by the No. 205 Group RAF.

From 1942 - 1944, RAF Shallufa hosted the No. 5 Middle East Torpedo (Training) School, and trained several Chinese aircrew. The airfield had four asphalt runways and was operated by the Near East Air Force. RAF Shallufa had a satellite airfield at 30°06′5″N 32°31′0″E, and was designated as LG-252 and named Shallufa North. The No. 221 Squadron RAF was based there from 11 August 1942, until 22 August 1942, when it relocated to RAF Shallufa.

=== Post-war ===
No. 104 Squadron disbanded at Shallufa on 1 April 1947.

In July 1947, Operation Sunray was introduced into the training programme of the Bomber Command, with RAF Shallufa serving as the primary host base. At the beginning of each month, six aircraft from one station alternating between 1 and 3 groups, would depart for a monthlong attachment to the base. By conducting long-range and bombing range training, the operation provided bomber squadrons with practice in mobility, live bombing, air firing, and exercises with fighter squadrons. In January 1948 and again in June-July 1948, the No. 35 Squadron RAF had a detachment at RAF Shallufa for Operation Sunray, using the Avro Lancaster B.I.

On 1 November, 1950, RAF Shallufa began operating as a medium bomber base and operational training base for the Bomber Command. It provided training to the command, and Mosquito marker elements were assigned for target marking. Additionally, bombing range factories were built at Shallufa North. On 31 October, 1954, RAF Shallufa was closed and its station headquarters was disbanded. In 1955, a ceremonial flag handover of the base by Prime Minister Nasser was held.

== Layout ==
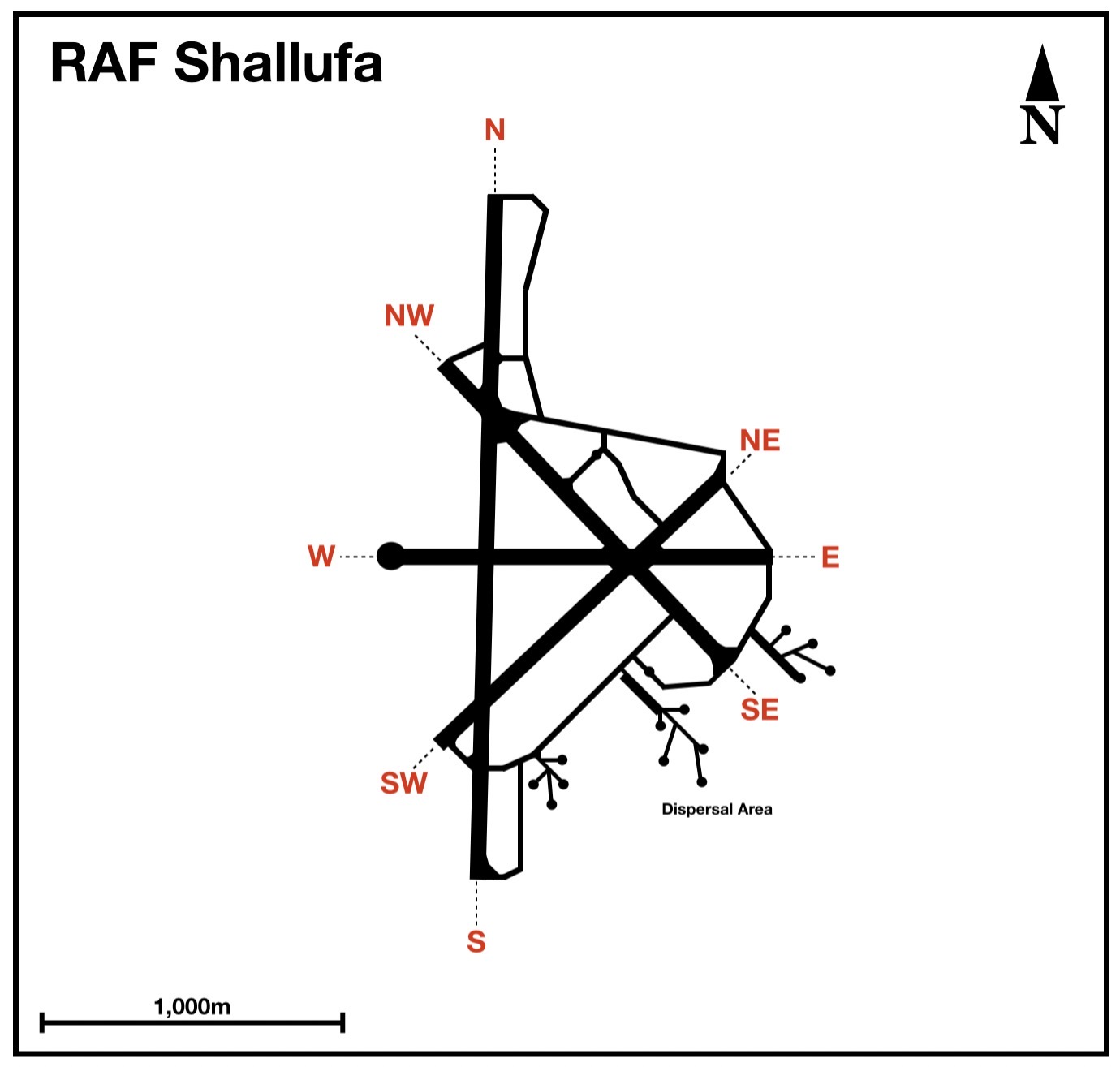
A modern diagram of RAF Shallufa.

The runways were lighted with electric cables. The airfield had an air traffic control tower, a 14-bed infirmary, shops and an administrative building. On site was two installed steel hangars, a swimming pool, and a cinema. For refueling purposes, Shallufa had a capacity of 86,000 gallons of Aviation Gas and 28,920 gallons of jet fuel. While not related to the airfield, nearby was a speedway commonly used by the people who were stationed there.

== Units ==
The following units based at RAF Shallufa:

Royal Air Force

- No. 20 Training Depot Station between 2 August and November 1918 then May 1919 and 24 June 1919
- No. 17 Training Depot Station between May 1919 and 25 July 1919
- No. 37 Squadron RAF initially between 17 December 1940 and 27 April 1942 with the Vickers Wellington IC
- No. 38 Squadron RAF between 18 December 1940 and 28 February 1943 with the Wellington IC, II & VIII
- Detachment from No. 90 Squadron RAF between August and October 1941 with the Boeing Fortress I
- Detachment from No. 76 Squadron RAF between October 1941 and September 1942 with the Handley Page Halifax II
- Detachment No. 220 Squadron RAF between 1 December 1941 and 2 May 1942 with the Fortress I
- No. 162 Squadron RAF between 6 January and 12 April 1942 with the Wellington IC
- No. 40 Squadron RAF between 23 June and 20 August 1942 with the Wellington IC
- No. 39 Squadron RAF between 2 October 1942 and June 1943 with the Bristol Beaufort II
- No. 458 Squadron RAAF between 1 September 1942 and 30 March 1943 with the Wellington IC & VIII
- No. 221 Squadron RAF between 11 August 1942 and 1 February 1943 with the Wellington VIII
- Detachment from No. 14 Squadron RAF between February and June 1943 with the Martin Marauder I
- Detachment from No. 252 Squadron RAF between December 1943 and January 1944 with the Bristol Beaufighter XI
- Detachment No. 351 (Jugoslav) Squadron RAF between July and September 1944 with the Hawker Hurricane IIC
- No. 46 Squadron RAF between 13 and 21 December 1944 with the de Havilland Mosquito XII

Non-flying and support units

- No. 63 Repair & Salvage Unit - 10 Nov 1942
- No. 5 (Middle East) Training School, July 1942 — March 1944
- Carrier Pigeon Service Unit, January 1943 — April 1943
- No. 1 Mobile Service Unit (Torpedo), January 1943 — April 1943
- No. 3 Mobile Service Unit (Torpedo), January 1943 — April 1943
- No. 39 Squadron, Ground Party, January 1943 — February 1943
- HQ, No. 245 (Naval Co-operation) Wing (20 Feb - 15 Apr 1943)
- No. 14 RAF Mobile Servicing Unit (Torpedo), 16 April 1943 - 1 December 1944
- Middle East Armament School, 1 May 1943 - 9 October 1945
- No. 39 Royal Navy Personnel Transit Centre, 3 May 1944 - August 1945
- No. 75 Operational Training Unit, 9 February 1945 - 25 June 1945
- No. 1342 Rocket Projectile Training Flight, February 1945 - 15 April 1945
- No. 1343 Conversion Flight, March 1945 - 12 September 1945

=== Post-war units ===
The following units that were based at RAF Shallufa after World War II:

Royal Air Force

- No. 37 Squadron RAF between 12 December 1945 and 31 March 1946 with the Consolidated Liberator VI then between 16 September 1946 and 1 April 1947 with the Avro Lancaster B.7, then as detachment between September 1947 and March 1948 with the Lancaster MR.3
- No. 70 Squadron RAF initially between 12 December 1945 and 31 March 1946 with the Liberator VI then between 17 September 1946 and 1 April 1947 with the Lancaster B.1(FE)
- Detachment from No. 620 Squadron RAF between March and June 1946 with the Halifax A.7
- No. 104 Squadron RAF between 1 July 1946 and 1 April 1947 with the Lancaster B.7(FE) Disbanded on 1 April 1947.
- No. 37 Squadron RAF between 16 September 1946 and 1 April 1947 with the Avro Lancaster B.7, then as detachment between September 1947 and March 1948 with the Lancaster MR.3
- No. 6 Squadron RAF between 5 September and 26 November 1947 with the Hawker Tempest F.6
- No. 213 (Ceylon) Squadron RAF between 3 September and 22 October 1947 with the Tempest F.6
- Detachment from No. 82 (United Provinces) Squadron RAF between October 1947 and November 1948 with the Lancaster PR.1
- No. 32 Squadron RAF between 4 January 1951 and 27 January 1952 with the de Havilland Vampire FB.5

Non-flying and support units

- No. 21201 Air Ministry Experimental Station, 15 September 1947
- Mediterranean and Middle East Communication Squadron, 25 October 1947 - 27 October 1947
- No. 5 Maintenance Repair Unit, 1 December 1947 - 15 January 1948
- No. 9 Mobile Parachute Servicing Unit, 12 January 1948
- Middle East Air Force Target Towing Unit, 1 January 1950 - 15 January 1952
- Middle East Air Force Instrument Training Flight, 5 June 1950 - 15 January 1952

== Accidents & incidents ==
- On 21 February 1943, a Martin Marauder took off at Shallufa to attack ships. However the aircraft was gunned down and six fatalities were reported.
- On 12 January 1949, a four engine aircraft during training dived and crashed near the airfield with nine fatalities reported. The cause of this crash was a faulty right elevator that detached.
- On 22 October 1951, a de Havilland Vampire did a crash-landing on the runway in which the pilot was unfortunately killed.

== See also ==
- List of North African airfields during World War II
