= Landing Ground 174 =

WWII Airfield in Egypt

Landing Ground 174
- Part of Ninth Air Force

Site information
- Type: Military airfield
- Controlled by: United States Army Air Forces

Location
- Coordinates: 30°45′44.08″N 029°07′15.33″E

Site history
- Built: 1942
- In use: 1942

Location of Landing Ground 174, Egypt

Landing Ground 174 is an abandoned World War II military airfield in Egypt, east of El Alamein, about 80 km southwest of Alexandria.

It was used by the Ninth Air Force of the United States Army Air Forces during the Western Desert Campaign by the British Eighth Army, which the 57th Fighter Group, flew P-40 Warhawks from on 16 September-5 November 1942.

Close examination of aerial photography of the hard desert about 10 miles east of El Alamein shows some evidence of disturbance which could indicate where it existed.

== See also ==
- List of North African airfields during World War II
