= Bilbays Air Base =

Bilbays Air Base
- قاعدة بلبيس الجوية
- Bilbeis, Sharqia Governorate in Egypt

Site information
- Type: Air Base
- Owner: Ministry of Defense (Egypt)
- Operator: Egyptian Air Force

Location
- Shown within Egypt
- Coordinates: 30°23′42″N 031°36′05″E

Site history
- Built: 1985
- In use: 1985 - present

Airfield information
- Elevation: 27 metres (89 ft) AMSL
Runways
Direction	Length and surface
04/22	3,470 metres (11,385 ft) Asphalt
09L/27R	1,475 metres (4,839 ft) Asphalt
09R/27L	2,500 metres (8,202 ft) Asphalt
17L/35R	2,975 metres (9,760 ft) Asphalt
17R/35L	1,515 metres (4,970 ft) Asphalt

Bilbays Air Base is an Egyptian Air Force airbase located near Bilbeis, Sharqia Governorate, Egypt. It was formerly RAF Bilbeis, a Royal Air Force station operational during the Second World War.

The air base is home to the Egyptian Air Academy that operates No. 3 & 5 Squadrons which flies the Grob G 115EG as part of 101 Air Brigade, along with No. 28 and 29 Squadrons which flies the Hongdu K-8E as part of the 201 Air Wing and No. 54 Squadron which flies the Aérospatiale SA342L Gazelle as part of 301 Air Wing.

Former RAF units

- Detachment from No. 31 Squadron RAF between September 1941 and February 1942 with the Douglas DC-2
- No. 117 Squadron RAF between 3 November 1941 and 5 July 1943 with the de Havilland DH.86 Express, Lockheed Hudson VI, Lockheed Lodestar and the Douglas DC-3
- No. 162 Squadron RAF between January 1942 and 4 April 1943 with the Vickers Wellington IC, Bristol Blenheim IV & V
- No. 267 Squadron RAF between 18 August 1942 and 9 January 1943 with the Lodestar, Messerschmitt Bf 109F, Hudson IV & VI and the DC-3

== See also ==
- List of North African airfields during World War II
