= RAF Aboukir =

Former Royal Air Force station near Alexandria, Egypt

RAF Aboukir RAF Aboukir Bay
- Egyptian Arabic: ابو قير
- Abu Qir, Alexandria Governorate in Egypt
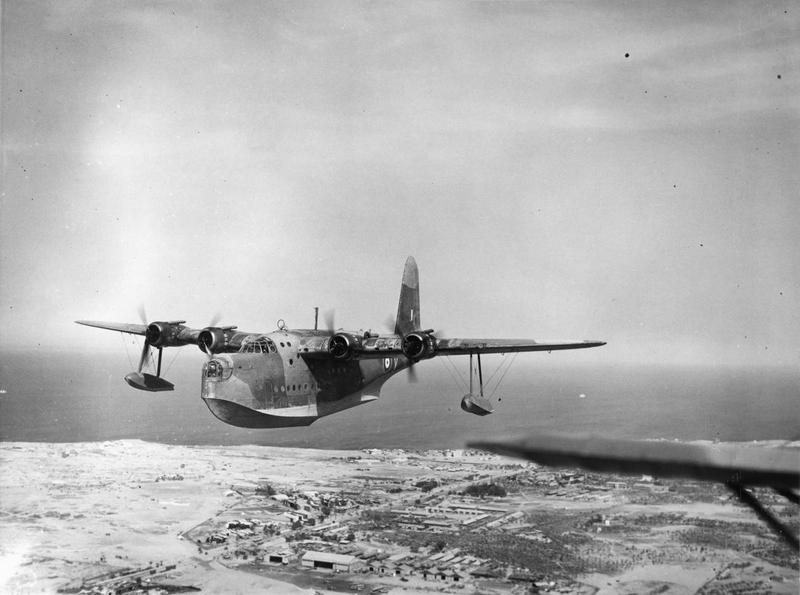
- A Short Sunderland flying over RAF Aboukir after taking off from RAF Aboukir Bay

Site information
- Type: Royal Air Force station
- Code: LG-34
- Owner: Air Ministry
- Operator: Royal Air Force
- Controlled by: RAF Middle East

Location
- Shown within Egypt
- Coordinates: 31°18′05″N 030°03′40″E

Site history
- Built: 1916
- In use: 1916-1947

Garrison information
- Past commanders: Group Captain Tulloch

Airfield information
- Elevation: −5 metres (−16 ft) AMSL
Runways
Direction	Length and surface
00/00	Concrete

Royal Air Force Aboukir or more simply RAF Aboukir is a former Royal Air Force station located 6.6 miles (10.6 km) northwest of Kafr El-Dawar and 7.2 miles (11.6 km) east of Alexandria, Egypt. Between 1916 and 1947 a number of units and squadrons were based there, including the central depot for RAF Middle East until 12 November 1939.

There were two RAF stations near Aboukir: RAF Aboukir was located inland and RAF Aboukir Bay located on the seafront and used by seaplanes.

== History ==
The bases was used by the following squadrons:

- Aboukir
  - No. 29 Squadron RAF between 6 August 1936 and 12 September 1936 with Fairey Gordon light bombers.
  - No. 56 Squadron RAF reformed here on 1 February 1920 with the Sopwith Snipe with a detachment at San Stephano until August 1923. However 56 Squadron was disbanded on 23 September 1922.
  - No. 64 Squadron RAF from 1 August 1936 with the Hawker Demon until 16 August 1936 when the squadron moved to the United Kingdom.
  - No. 80 Squadron RAF between 10 June 1919 and 1 February 1920 when the squadron disbanded, the squadron flew the Snipe.
  - No. 94 Squadron RAF between August and October 1944 as a detachment with the Supermarine Spitfire VB.
  - No. 112 Squadron RAF from 22 April 1941 and 31 May 1941 as a detachment with Hawker Hurricane I.
  - No. 123 (East India) Squadron RAF between 19 June 1942 and 19 July 1942 with the Spitfire VB.
  - No. 142 Squadron RAF from 13 October 1935 and 26 October 1935 with the Hawker Hart.
  - No. 145 Squadron RAF was formed here on 15 May 1918 before moving to Abu Sueir on 1 June 1918.
  - No. 208 Squadron RAF as a detachment between 18 April 1936 and 28 September 1938 with the Hawker Demon.
  - No. 237 (Rhodesia) Squadron RAF as a detachment between 25 February 1944 and 19 April 1944 with the Spitfire VC & IX.
  - No. 252 Squadron RAF between 6 February 1945 and 10 February 1945 with the Bristol Beaufighter X.
  - No. 294 Squadron RAF as a detachment between 29 March 1944 and 6 June 1945 with Vickers Wellington IC.
  - No. 451 Squadron RAAF between 12 May 1941 and 1 July 1941 with the Hurricane I.
  - No. 603 (City of Edinburgh) Squadron AAF between 21 December 1942 and 25 January 1943 with no aircraft.
  - No. 651 Squadron RAF between 9 and 10 November 1945 with the Taylorcraft Auster V .
- Aboukir Bay
  - No. 204 Squadron RAF between 27 September and 22 October 1935 with the Supermarine Southampton II and Supermarine Scapa
  - No. 228 Squadron RAF between 19 July and 13 September 1940 with the Short Sunderland I
  - No. 230 Squadron RAF between May 1940 and 3 July 1942 with the Sunderland I/II/III
    - No. 2 Yugoslav (floatplane) Squadron between May 1941 and April 1942 with the Dornier Do 22 and Rogožarski SIM-XIV-H

The bases was also used by a number of different units during its lifetime:

- Headquarters 20th (Reserve) Wing RFC between 25 July 1916 and 31 May 1917.
- RAF Depot, Middle East between 7 October and 12 November 1939.
- No. 103 Maintenance Unit RAF between 12 November 1939 and 30 October 1946.

== Current use ==
The site is un-recognizable and is used for farming.

== See also ==
- List of former Royal Air Force stations
- List of North African airfields during World War II
