= El Daba Airfield Complex =

Airport in Egypt

RAF El Daba Landing Ground 105

Location
- Coordinates: 30°59′59″N 028°27′59″E

Site history
- Built: 1939
- In use: 1939-1943

Location of RAF El Daba

El Daba Airfield Complex was a military cluster of airfields used during World War II located approximately 4.6 kilometres south-southeast of the village. El Daba was a pre–World War II airfield, one of a number of DLGs created in the Western Desert of Egypt after the Munich Crisis of the late 1930s. During World War II, it was used as a military airfield by the British Royal Air Force and the United States Army Air Forces during the North African campaign against Axis forces, and by the Luftwaffe.

== History ==
Airfields of the El Daba Complex

=== Mumin Busak Airfield ===
On 2-3 July, 1942, the first Luftwaffe and Regia Aeronautica squadrons arrived at Mumin Busak Airfield. It composed of a natural desert surface landing ground with 4 level and graded landing strips. On 2 July, 1942, the I. Gruppe of Jadgeschwader 27 arrived, and flew multiple combat missions in support of the Axis-led Battle of El Alamein. The squadron included fighter ace Günter Steinhausen, who claimed multiple Allied aircraft during missions flown from the airfield. Jagdgeschwader 27 had also based its headquarters at Mumin Busak Airfield, with a total of 4 Bf 109 fighters out of the 92 assigned to the headquarters. Throughout the first half of July 1942, the airfield operated as a forward fighter base by the Luftwaffe.

However, immediately after occupation, daily attacks were launched by Allied bombers and fighter-bombers beginning on 4 July. On 5 July, an Allied low-level attack destroyed one Bf 109 F-4 of the III./JG 27, and one C.202 fighter from the 6° Gruppo CT, both of which were on the ground. On 6 July, it was bombed and strafed by Kittyhawks, destroying one Bf 109 F-4 and one C.202 on the ground. On 13 July, the airfield was bombed again, rendering one Bf 109 F-4 unserviceable. On 4-5 November, 1942, El Daba Airfield Complex was re-captured by advancing British and Commonwealth troops.

=== El Daba Süd ===
El Daba Süd, designated as LG-24, operated as a satellite landing ground. It consisted of a natural hard sand and clay surfaced landing ground measuring 1145 x 730 meters, which would become unserviceable after rain. Fuel and ammunition were brought in from the main airfield when needed and there were dispersal space for aircraft.

=== El Daba West ===
El Daba West, designated as LG-22, operated as a satellite landing ground.

== Facilities ==
The four airstrips within the landing ground at Mumin Busak Airfield included W/E measuring 1600 meters long and 200 meters wide, WNW/ESE measuring 2700 metres long and 200 meters wide, N/S measuring 2400 meters long and 200 meters wide, and SW/NE measuring 2000 meters long and 200 meters wide. All of which were levelled and graded, and aircraft dispersal covered a large area due to the expansive flat terrain.

== Units ==
Royal Air Force Squadrons which used the airfield between 1939 and 1943 were No's 30, 33, 45, 73, 74 113, 211.

USAAF Ninth Air Force units which used the airfield were:

- 57th Fighter Group, 5–8 November 1942, P-40 Warhawk

After the war, El Daba appears to have been closed about 1946. Today, the area is heavily used by agriculture. There is no evidence of the airfield's existence.

== British Coordinates ==
- LG-105 31°00′0″N 28°28′0″E

== See also ==
- List of North African airfields during World War II
