= RAF Beit Daras =

Former Royal Air Force station in Israel

RAF Beit Daras
- Bayt Daras, in Israel
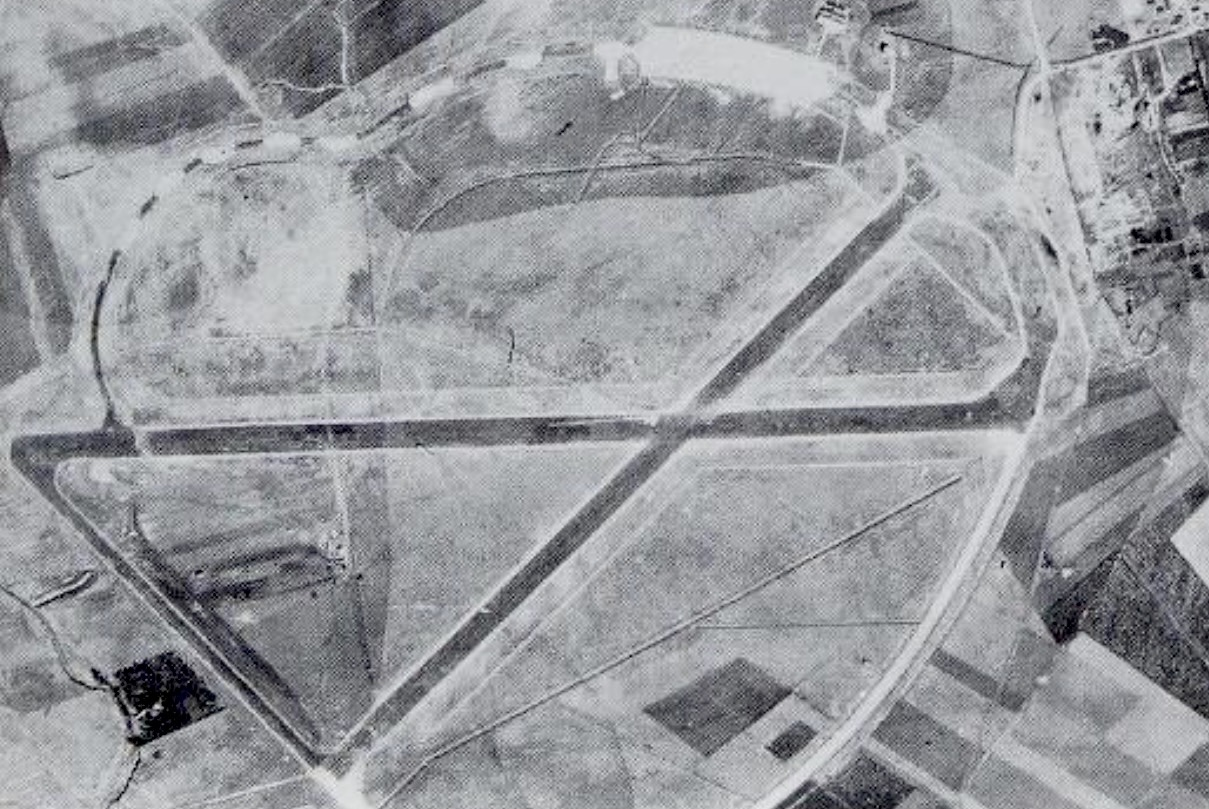
- Aerial photograph of Beit Daras Airfield, at the time of operation as a satellite airfield under the nearby RAF Qastina.

Site information
- Owner: Air Ministry
- Operator: Royal Air Force

Location
- Shown within Israel
- Coordinates: 31°44′10″N 34°41′57″E

Site history
- Built: 1941
- In use: 1941 - 1949
- Fate: Demolished

Airfield information
- Elevation: 100 metres (328 ft) AMSL
Runways
Direction	Length and surface
NW/SE	1,827.8 metres (5,997 ft) Asphalt
N/W	1,508.76 metres (4,950 ft) Asphalt

Royal Air Force Beit Daras or more simply RAF Beit Daras is a former Royal Air Force station located in Bayt Daras, Mandatory Palestine (now Israel). It was established in 1941 for use by the Royal Air Force, and it was later used by the Israeli Air Force as an emergency landing ground following post-war abandonment.

== History ==
RAF Beit Daras was built in 1941 by the Royal Air Force in the British Mandate Palestine. The airfield operated as a satellite under RAF Qastina. It was used by RAF de Havilland Mosquito bombers for supply flights. The 66th Fighter Squadron was based at RAF Beit Daras between 8 June and 5 July 1942, primarily playing a defense role. After World War II, the airfield was abandoned by the RAF.

=== Post-war ===
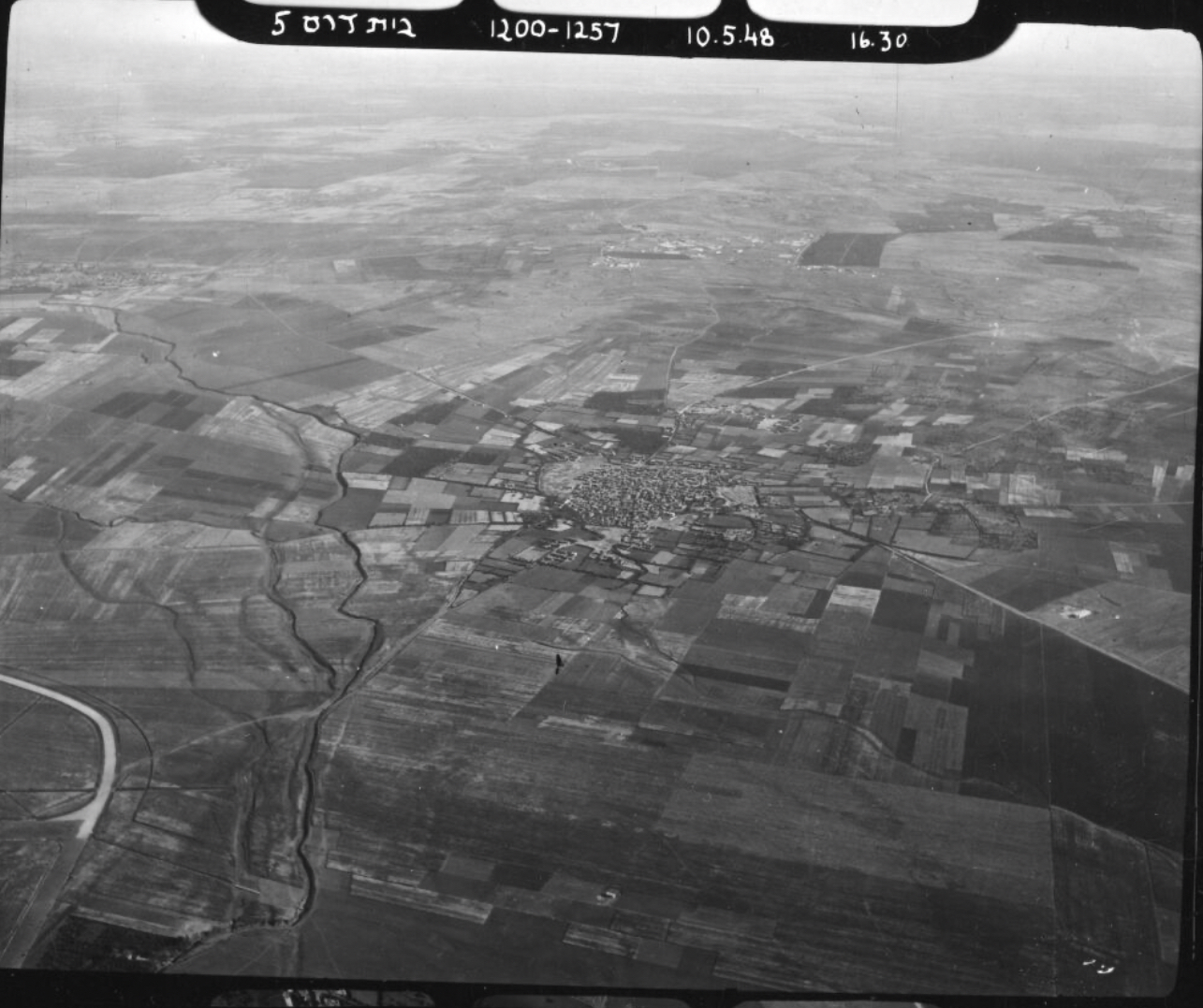
An aerial photograph taken in 1948, shows the runway of RAF Beit Daras in the lower left corner.

During the 1948 Palestine war, by April, the Haganah had begun to lack armed manpower beyond what was needed for defense. Subsequently, the paramilitary organisation underwent reorganisation in battalion and brigade formations. What followed was the covert Czechoslovak Arms Deal. Beit Daras Airfield was briefly reactivated with the temporary installation of facilities. On the night of 31 March 1948, a chartered American Douglas C-54 Skymaster originating from Czechoslovakia landed at Beit Daras Airfield. The flight airlifted 40 MG 34 machine guns, 200 rifles, and 160,000 bullets. Its cargo was unloaded and handed over to the nearest settlement, and took off for Prague after two hours. The mission would effectively become the first flight of Operation Balak, which was done in part of the arms deal. This prepared the Haganah for a military operation due to launch on April 6, which led to additional airlifts taking place elsewhere.

Eventually, the airfield was operated by the Israeli Air Force as an emergency landing ground for occasional manoeuvre.

Afterwards, the airfield was used as a one-time minor civil airfield known as Kiryat Gat or El-Faluja. Currently, there are no remnants of the airfield.

== Layout ==
On-site was two wooden hangars, two asphalt runways (NW/SE, 1,827 meters, N/W, 1,508 meters), and also a nearby power plant.

== Units ==
The followings units based at RAF Beit Daras at one point.

USAAF

- 66th Weapons Squadron, 19 August 1942 - 16 September 1942
- 66th Fighter Squadron between 8 June and 5 July 1942

RAF

- No. 1434 (Photographic Survey) Flight RAF between 24 May and 1 July 1943, when the flight was disbanded
- HQ, No. 283 (Airborne Forces) Wing, 1 Feb 1946 - 17 Jan 1947.

== In popular culture ==
- Beit Daras Airfield was featured in suspense and medical fiction novel, Joe's Trial: An Almost True Story, written by Moses Brand.
