= Kambut =

Kambut كمبوت Gambut
- Village
- Location in Libya
- Coordinates: 31°54′19″N 24°28′53″E
- Country: Libya
- District: Butnan

Population (2006)
  - Total: 5,292
- Time zone: UTC+2 (EET)

Kambut, sometimes is known as Gambut, is a village in eastern Libya, some 50 km (31 mi) east of Tobruk. It is a site of an old military airfield in World War II.

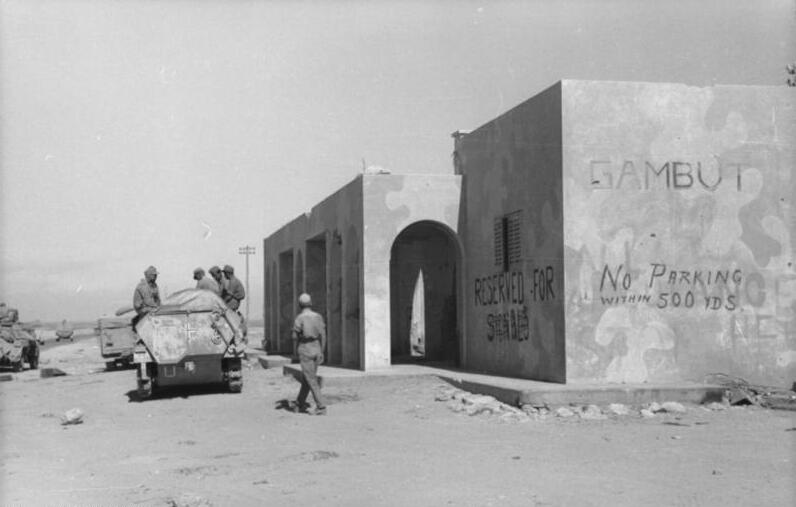
German soldiers in Kambut, 1942.
