= RAF Petah Tiqva =

RAF Petah Tiqva
- Kfar Sirkin, Central District in Israel

Site information
- Type: Royal Air Force station
- Owner: Air Ministry
- Operator: Royal Air Force
- Controlled by: RAF Mediterranean and Middle East

Location
- Shown within Israel
- Coordinates: 32°05′16″N 034°54′59″E

Site history
- Built: 1941
- In use: 1941 - 1948

Airfield information
- Elevation: 33 metres (108 ft) AMSL
Runways
Direction	Length and surface
02/20	1,285 metres (4,216 ft) Asphalt
10/28	1,340 metres (4,396 ft) Asphalt
14/32	1,260 metres (4,134 ft) Asphalt

Royal Air Force Petah Tiqva better known as RAF Sirkin or Camp Sirkin is a former Royal Air Force station located northwest of Kfar Sirkin, Central District, Israel. After the end of their mandate over Palestine and the withdrawal of the British in May 1948, the airbase was taken over by the Israeli Air Force and served as their first Flight Academy until 1955.

== Units ==
The following squadrons were here at some point:

- No. 6 Squadron RAF between 3 and 28 September 1945 with the Hawker Hurricane IV
- No. 14 Squadron RAF between 7 July and 10 August 1941 with the Bristol Blenheim IV
- No. 32 Squadron RAF between 27 September 1945 and 15 March 1946 with the Supermarine Spitfire IX
- No. 208 Squadron RAF between 13 August 1945 and 12 March 1946 with the Spitfire IX
- No. 651 Squadron RAF between 10 July 1946 and 28 April 1948 with the Taylorcraft Auster V

Units:

- No. 74 Operational Training Unit RAF between 20 September 1943 and 16 July 1945 with the Hurricane, North American Harvard and Spitfire
- No. 285 (Strategic Reconnaissance) Wing RAF between 2 September and 30 September 1945
- No. 1906 AOP Flight RAF between 26 June and 24 July 1947 with the Auster V
- No. 1907 AOP Flight RAF between 26 June and August 1947 with the Auster V
- No. 1908 AOP Flight RAF initially between 31 December 1946 and 1 June 1947, then between 11 February and 28 April 1948 with the Auster V
- No. 1909 AOP Flight RAF between 30 June and August 1947 with the Auster V
- No. 1910 AOP Flight RAF between 11 February and 28 April 1948 with the Auster V

== See also ==
- List of former Royal Air Force stations
