= Maaten Bagush =

Coordinates: 31°10′21″N 27°40′10″E

Maaten Bagush (Ma'aten Baggush) was a vast transit camp on the Mediterranean shore, near the Baggush Box ~50 km east of Mersa Matruh, Egypt. It was used by the British Forces during World War II.
