= La Vallon Airfield =

Abandoned airfield in France

La Vallon Airfield (Y-18)

- Rhône-Alpes Region, France La Vallon Airfield (France)

Site information
- Type: Military airfield
- Controlled by: United States Army Air Forces

Location
- Coordinates: 43°37′28.09″N 004°55′46.91″E

Site history
- Built: 1944
- In use: 1944

La Vallon Airfield is an abandoned World War II military airfield in France. It is located 13 km north of Istres in Bouches-du-Rhône.

La Vallon was an all-weather temporary sod airfield built by USAAF XII Engineer Command. The runway was 7,800 feet (2,400 m) in length, 300 feet (91 m) wide, and aligned 13/31. The airfield was equipped with an access road was built to the existing road infrastructure; a dump for supplies, ammunition, and gasoline drums, along with a drinkable water and minimal electrical grid for communications and station lighting. Tents were used for billeting and also for support facilities.

Designated as an Advanced Landing Ground Y-18 it was turned over to the United States Army Air Force Twelfth Air Force on 30 August 1944. The 417th Night Fighter Squadron used the airfield 12 September 1944 – 5 April 1945, flying Bristol Beaufighters. In addition, the 415th Night Fighter Squadron flew Bristol Beaufighters from the airfield 1–25 September 1944.

When the Americans pulled out in April 1945, the airfield was dismantled by engineers and returned to agriculture. An outline of the airfield remains as agricultural fields in aerial photos today.

== See also ==
- Advanced Landing Ground
