= No. 211 Group RAF =

Former Royal Air Force operations group

No. 211 (Offensive Fighter) Group ~~No. 211 (Medium Bomber) Group~~
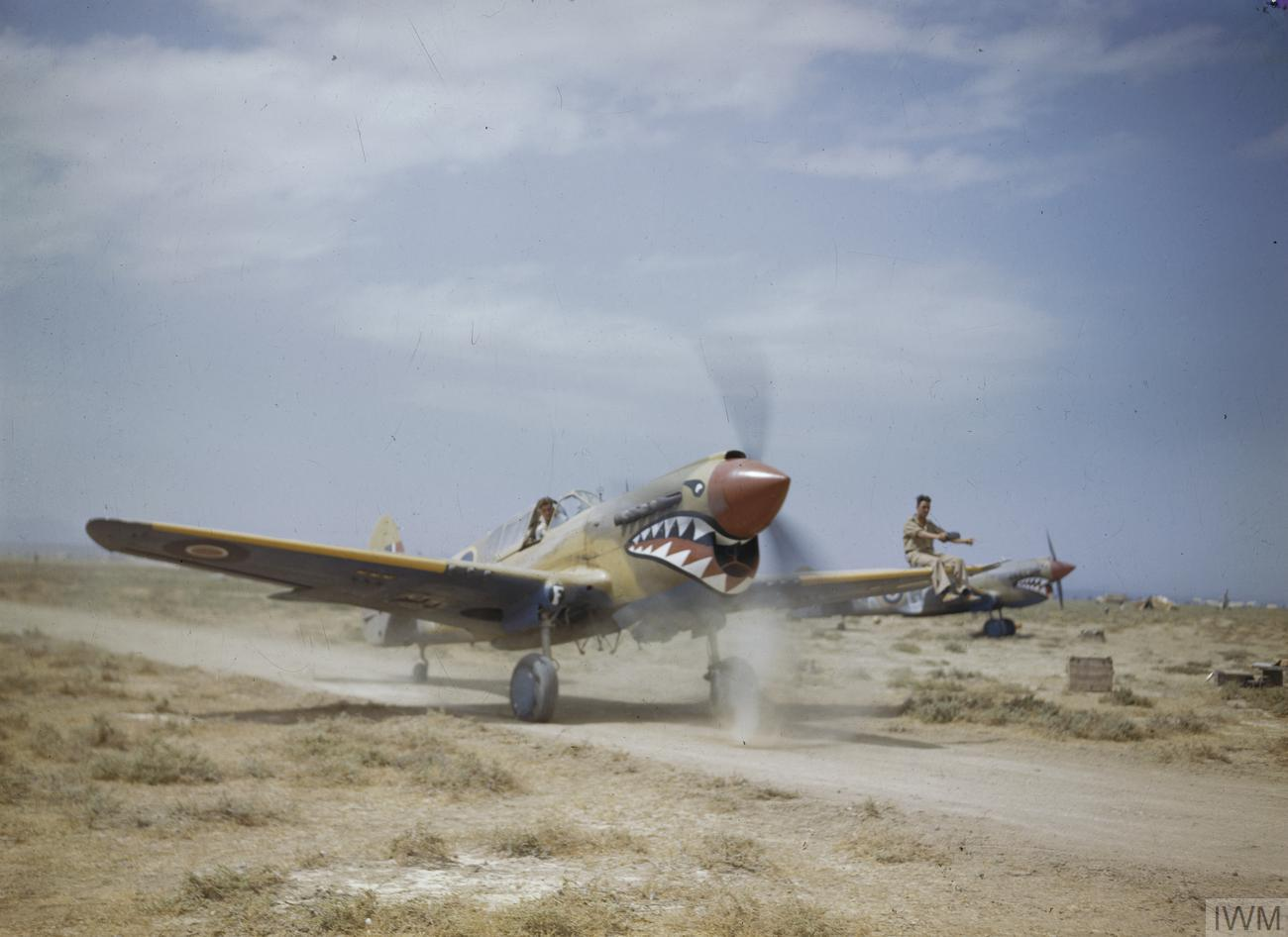
- A Kittyhawk of No. 112 Squadron, (No. 239 Wing) 211 Group at Medenine, Tunisia in 1943.
- Active: 10 December 1941 – 3 February 1942; 12 March 1942 - 17 September 1943
- Disbanded: 3 February 1942
- Country: United Kingdom
- Branch: Royal Air Force
- Type: Royal Air Force group
- Part of: Air Headquarters Western Desert (1941 - 1942); RAF Middle East Command (1942 - 1943)
- Royal Air Force Ensign

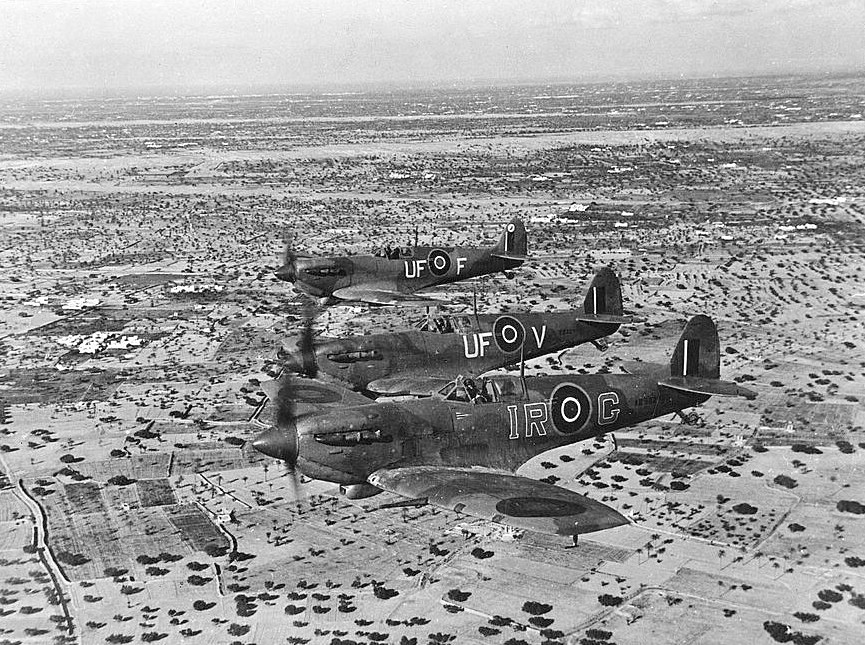
Spitfires of No. 244 Wing in early 1943.

No. 211 Group RAF (211 Gp) is a former Royal Air Force group which disbanded in September 1943. It initially formed in December 1941, then disbanded in February 1942. The group immediately reformed in March 1942 as No. 211 (Offensive Fighter) Group within RAF Middle East Command.

== History ==
No 211 Group or No. 211 (Medium Bomber) Group was a Group of the Royal Air Force (RAF) formed on 10 December 1941 by renaming Nucleus Group Western Desert. The group was officially disbanded from 3 February 1942 to 12 March 1942, although some references refer to some of its original squadrons during this period as being with 211 Group. On 12 March 1942, the group reformed as No. 211 (Offensive Fighter) Group, seemingly with its headquarters at El Adem Airfield near Benghazi. Air Commodore Richard Atcherley assumed command of the group on 11 April 1943. At this time, 211 Group was the principle fighter force of the Desert Air Force (DAF) commanded by Air Vice-Marshal Harry Broadhurst, and DAF was a sub-command of Air Marshal Sir Arthur Coningham's Northwest African Tactical Air Force (NATAF).

The group included many units from the South African Air Force (SAAF), as well as several from the Royal Australian Air Force (RAAF) and the United States Army Air Forces (USAAF), with one each from the Hellenic Air Force and Royal Canadian Air Force. Many personnel from other British Commonwealth air forces also served in RAF, SAAF, RAAF and RCAF units, under the British Commonwealth Air Training Plan and related arrangements.

Throughout the North African Campaign, the medium bomber and fighter squadrons of Air Headquarters Western Desert, also known at various times of the campaign as Air Headquarters Libya, Western Desert Air Force, or DAF, were primarily assigned to either 211 Group or No. 212 (Fighter Control) Group (later No. 212 (Fighter) Group).

== Order of battle 1942 and 1943 ==
Group assignments for squadrons during the campaigns in Egypt, Libya, and Tunisia are for the period from July 1942 to 10 July 1943 when the Allies invaded Sicily (Operation Husky).

Squadrons of Nos. 211 & 212 Groups July 1942 – July 1943
| No. 212 Group July 1942 | Nos. 211 & 212 Groups 27 October 1942 | No. 211 Group 10 July 1943 |
|---|---|---|
| No. 233 Wing RAF/7 Wing SAAF: 2 Squadron SAAF (Kittyhawk); 4 Squadron SAAF (Tomahawk & Kittyhawk); 5 Squadron SAAF (Tomahawk); No. 260 Squadron RAF (Kittyhawk) | No. 233 Wing [211 Group]: No. 2 Squadron SAAF (16 x Kittyhawks I, II & III); No. 4 Squadron SAAF (16 x Kittyhawks I, II & III); No. 5 Squadron SAAF (16 x Tomahawks); No. 260 Squadron RAF (16 x Kittyhawks I & IIb) | No. 7 Wing SAAF: No. 2 Squadron SAAF, Spitfire; No. 4 Squadron SAAF, Spitfire; No. 5 Squadron SAAF, Kittyhawk; See No. 239 Wing |
| 7 Wing SAAF: No. 80 Squadron RAF (Hurricane); No. 127 Squadron RAF (Hurricane); No. 274 Squadron RAF (Hurricane); No. 335 (Greek) Squadron (Hurricane) | No. 7 Wing SAAF [No. 212 Group] No. 80 Squadron SAAF (16 x Hurricane IIc); No. 127 Squadron SAAF (16 x Hurricane IIb); No. 274 Squadron SAAF (16 x Hurricane IIb); No. 335 (Greek) Squadron (16 x Hurricane IIb) | |
| No. 239 Wing RAF: No. 3 Squadron RAAF (Kittyhawk); No. 112 Squadron RAF (Kittyhawk); No. 250 Squadron RAF (Kittyhawk); No. 450 Squadron RAAF (Kittyhawk) | No. 239 Wing [211 Group] - No. 112 Squadron RAF (16 x Kittyhawk IA); No. 250 Squadron RAF (16 x Kittyhawk IIA); No. 260 Squadron RAF (16 x Tomahawks); 66th Fighter Squadron (USAAF) (18 x P-40F Warhawks) | No. 239 Wing RAF No. 3 Squadron RAAF, Kittyhawk; No. 112 Squadron RAF, Kittyhawk; No. 250 Squadron RAF, Kittyhawk; No. 260 Squadron RAF, Kittyhawk; No. 450 Squadron RAAF, Kittyhawk |
| No. 244 Wing RAF: No. 73 Squadron RAF (Hurricane); No. 145 Squadron RAF (Spitfire V); No. 601 Squadron RAF (Spitfire V) | No. 244 Wing RAF [211 Group]: No. 73 Squadron RAF (16 x Tomahawks IIb); No. 92 Squadron RAF (16 x Spitfires Vc); No. 145 Squadron RAF (16x Spitfires Vb); No. 601 Squadron RAF (16x Spitfires Vb) | No. 244 Wing 1 Squadron SAAF, Spitfire; No. 92 Squadron RAF, Spitfire; No. 145 Squadron RAF, Spitfire; No. 417 Squadron RCAF, Spitfire; No. 601 Squadron RAF, Spitfire |
| No. 243 Wing RAF: No. 1 Squadron SAAF (Hurricane); No. 33 Squadron RAF (Hurricane); No. 213 Squadron RAF (Hurricane); No. 238 Squadron RAF (Hurricane) | No.243 Wing RAF [No. 212 Group]: No.1 Squadron SAAF (16 x Hurricane IIc); No. 33 Squadron RAF (16 x Hurricane IIc); No. 213 Squadron RAF (16 x Hurricane IIb); No. 238 Squadron RAF (16 x Hurricane IIb) | No. 322 Wing RAF; Colin Falkland Gray (RNZAF): No. 81 Squadron RAF, Spitfire; No. 152 Squadron RAF, Spitfire; No. 154 Squadron RAF, Spitfire; No. 232 Squadron RAF, Spitfire; No. 242 Squadron RAF, Spitfire |
| Other: No. 6 Squadron RAF (Hurricane IID) 7 Squadron SAAF (Hurricane IID) 40 Squadron SAAF (Hurricane) 60 Squadron SAAF (Maryland/Baltimore) No. 208 Squadron RAF (Tomahawk & Hurricane); - | Other Squadrons: No. 6 Squadron RAF (16x Hurricane IID); 7 Squadron SAAF (16 x Hurricane IID); 64th Fighter Squadron (USAAF) (18 x P-40F Warhawks); 65th Fighter Squadron (USAAF) (18 x P-40F Warhawks) | No. 324 Wing RAF No. 43 Squadron RAF, Spitfire; No. 72 Squadron RAF; No. 93 Squadron RAF, Spitfire; No. 111 Squadron RAF, Spitfire; No. 243 Squadron RAF, Spitfire - |
| Other Units: 1 Squadron RAAF (DH. 86); No. 2 PRU RAF (Spitfire IV); No. 437 Flight RAF (Maryland/Baltimore) | No. 212 Group was assigned to: Air H.Q. Air Defences Eastern Mediterranean and 211 Group was assigned to: Air H.Q. Western Desert in February 1943. | Other: No. 6 Squadron RAF, Hurricane; 57th Fighter Group USAAF (P-40); 64th Fighter Squadron; 65th Fighter Squadron; 66th Fighter Squadron; 79th Fighter Group USAAF (P-40); 85th Fighter Squadron; 86th Fighter Squadron; 87th Fighter Squadron |

Notes

SAAF – South African Air Force, RAAF – Royal Australian Air Force, RCAF – Royal Canadian Air Force; RNZAF -Royal New Zealand Air Force; PRU- Photographic Reconnaissance Unit; Sqns=Squadrons.

^The 57th Fighter Group USAAF had the 64th, 65th, and 66th; and the 79th Fighter Group USAAF had the 85th, 86th, and 87th Fighter Squadrons. For Operation Husky, the 57th and 79th Groups, No. 239 Wing, and some other units, made up the Rear Headquarters of DAF in Tripoli, Libya while the rest of 211 Group (Nos 244, 322, & 324 Wings) made up the Advanced Headquarters of DAF on the island of Malta.

== Operations ==
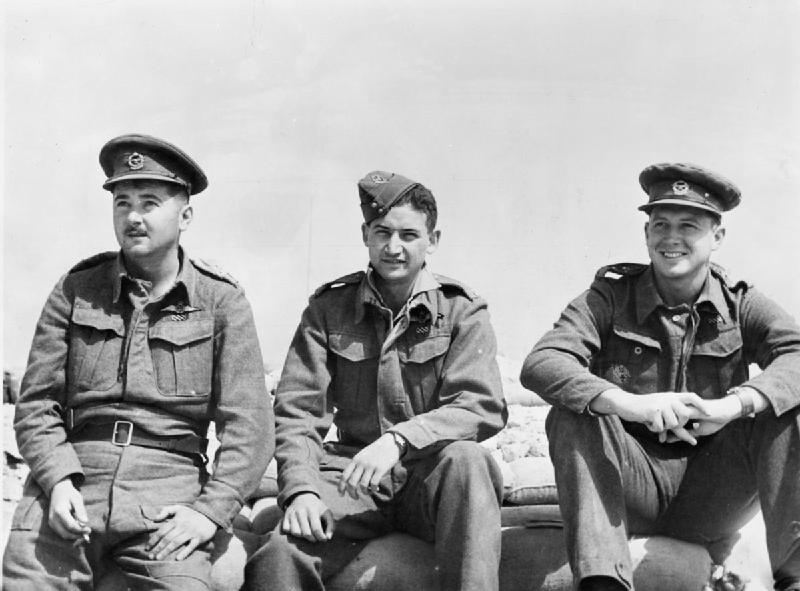
March/April 1942, Landing Ground 121, Egypt. Lieutenant Robin Pare (left), Major John "Jack" Frost (centre) and Captain Andrew Duncan (right) of No. 5 Squadron SAAF, Desert Air Force. All three had been killed or were missing in action by the end of June. Frost, the squadron commander, was the highest scoring ace in an SAAF unit during World War II.

Spitfires of No. 92 Squadron RAF and P-40F Warhawks of the 64th Fighter Squadron USAAF flew top cover for the P-40F Warhawks of the 65th and 66th Fighter Squadron and 314th Fighter Squadron (attached from the 324th Fighter Group), during the Palm Sunday Massacre of 18 April 1943. The three USAAF Warhawk Squadrons destroyed approximately 70 Axis aircraft that day.
