= Desert Air Force =

Allied tactical air unit during World War II

- Ensign of the Royal Air Force
- Founded: 21 October 1941
- Country: United Kingdom; South Africa; Australia
- Role: Tactical air force
- Size: over 1,500 combat aircraft (late 1942)
- Part of: RAF Middle East Command
- Engagements: Second World War

Commanders
- Notable commanders: Arthur Coningham; Harry Broadhurst; William Dickson

The Desert Air Force (DAF), also known chronologically as Air Headquarters Western Desert, Air Headquarters Libya, the Western Desert Air Force, and the First Tactical Air Force (1TAF), was an Allied tactical air force created from No. 204 Group RAF under RAF Middle East Command in North Africa in 1941 to provide close air support to the British Eighth Army against Axis forces. Throughout the Second World War, the DAF was made up of squadrons from the Royal Air Force (RAF), the South African Air Force (SAAF), the Royal Australian Air Force (RAAF), the United States Army Air Forces (USAAF) and other Allied air forces.

In October 1941, the Western Desert Air Forces had 16 squadrons of aircraft (nine fighter, six medium bomber and one tactical reconnaissance) and fielded approximately 1,000 combat aircraft by late 1941. By the time of the Second Battle of El Alamein, the DAF fielded 29 squadrons (including nine South African and three USAAF units) flying Boston, Baltimore and Mitchell medium bombers; Hurricane, Kittyhawk, Tomahawk, Warhawk and Spitfire fighters and fighter-bombers. There were over 1,500 combat aircraft, more than double the number of aircraft the Axis could field.

== History ==
Prior to the establishment of the Desert Air Force, several RAF formations operated in North Africa. On 3 September 1939, RAF Middle East Command—under Air Chief Marshal Sir William Mitchell, Air Officer Commanding-in-Chief Middle East—comprised four separate commands: for Egypt (designated Middle East), RAF Iraq, Mediterranean at Malta, and RAF Aden (No. 8, No. 203, and No. 94 Squadrons). Mitchell handed over to Air Vice Marshal Sir Arthur Longmore in early May 1940. When Italy declared war in June 1940, Longmore had just 29 squadrons numbering less than 300 aircraft in the four commands detailed above.

=== AHQ Egypt ===
On 10 June 1940, RAF bomber squadrons in AHQ Egypt—under the direction of No. 202 Group RAF—totalled five squadrons of Bristol Blenheims, one of Vickers Valentias and one of Bristol Bombays. The Valentia and Bombay could be used as troop transports or medium bombers.

- HQ 202 Group, Ma'aten Bagush
  - No. 250 Wing RAF, Ismailia
    - No. 30 Squadron RAF, Blenheim, Ismailia
    - No. 55 Squadron RAF, Blenheim, Fuka
    - No. 113 Squadron RAF, Blenheim, Ma'aten Bagush
  - No. 253 Wing RAF, Advanced HQ Ma'aten Bagush
    - No. 45 Squadron RAF, Blenheim, Fuka
    - No. 211 Squadron RAF, Blenheim, Daba
  - No. 70 (Bomber-Transport) Squadron RAF, Valentia, Helwan
  - No. 216 (Bomber-Transport) Squadron RAF, Bombay, Heliopolis

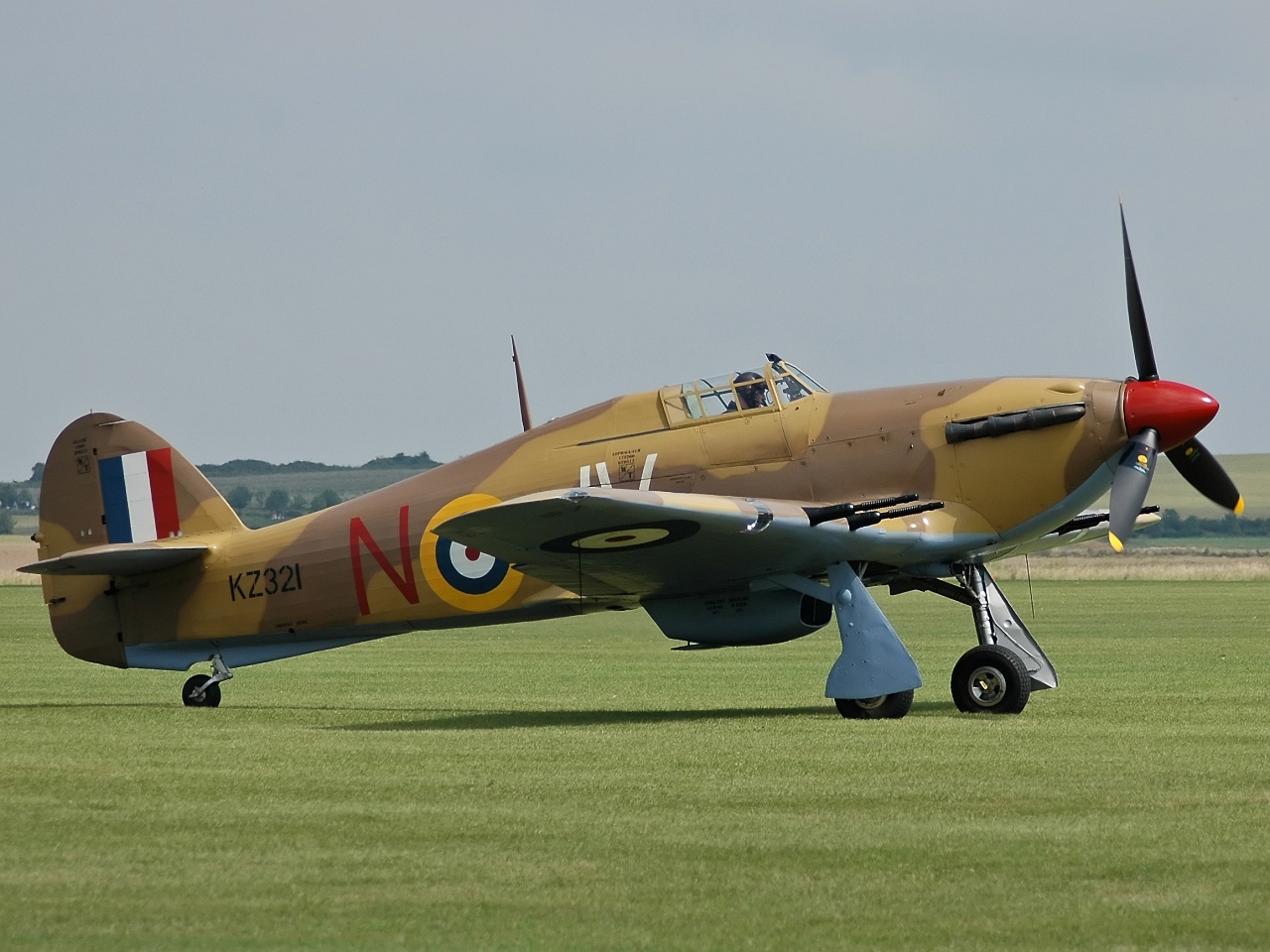
Hawker Hurricane in desert camouflage paint scheme

AHQ Sudan had 254 Wing with No. 14, No. 223 and No. 47 squadrons, AHQ Aden had No. 8, No. 11, and No. 39 squadrons, and No. 84 Squadron RAF was at Shaibah in Iraq with Blenheims.

Prior to the Italian invasion of Egypt, under Air Commodore Raymond Collishaw, the RAF in Egypt—which comprised nine squadrons—focused its activities on ground support, reconnaissance, and only when necessary aerial combat with the Italian Regia Aeronautica. The force at Collishaw's disposal consisted of No. 33, No. 80, and No. 112 Squadrons with Gloster Gladiators, No. 208 Squadron RAF with Westland Lysanders, four Blenheim squadrons (No.s 30, 55, 113, and 211) and No. 216 Squadron RAF with Bombays. With this small force, the RAF had to "equate its attempt to dominate the front line with avoidance of unnecessary losses". Aggressive actions induced a "defensive mentality among the Italians", aided by expedients such as using the single Hawker Hurricane in the Middle East, rapidly switched between landing grounds, to provide an exaggerated picture of British strength in the eyes of Italian reconnaissance aircraft. There were occasional single successes as well; on 17 August 1940, Gladiators covering the Mediterranean Fleet shot down eight Savoia-Marchetti SM.79 bombers without loss.

The force in the Middle East was clearly too small, reinforcement by sea was a 14,000-mile trip that required three months to complete, and reinforcement via the Western Mediterranean was hardly practical due to the ranges involved, which only bombers could achieve. Thus, an alternate reinforcement route began to be pioneered via Takoradi in the Gold Coast, from which new aircraft were received by sea, assembled, test flown, and ferried across Africa to Khartoum, a route first pioneered by Air Vice-Marshal Arthur Coningham in 1925. By this and other means, by the end of November 1940 the RAF in Egypt had been bolstered by No. 73 and No. 274 Squadrons with Hurricanes and No. 37 and No. 38 Squadrons with Vickers Wellingtons, as well as several South African Air Force squadrons, ready for the beginning of Operation Compass. During Compass, "the squadrons of Hurricanes, Lysanders, and Blenheims ... strove hard to keep pace [with the ground forces], often landing after a combat sortie at a more advanced strip than from which they had set out."

On 19 April 1941, RAF No. 204 Group was created under the command of Air Commodore Raymond Collishaw and consisted of:

- No. 73 Squadron (Hurricanes) at Tobruk
- No. 274 Squadron (Hurricanes) at Gerawla
- No. 14 Squadron (Blenheim IVs and Marauders) at Burg el Arab
- Detachment of No. 39 Squadron (Marylands) at Maaten Baggash
- Detachment of No. 24 Squadron SAAF (Marylands) at Fuka
- No. 45 Squadron (Blenheim IVs) at Fuka
- No. 55 Squadron (Blenheim IVs) at Zimla
- No. 6 Squadron (Hurricanes and Lysanders) at Tobruk.

On 30 July 1941, Collishaw handed over No. 204 Group to Coningham. Later that year, RAF Middle East Command came under the command of Air Marshal Sir Arthur Tedder. On 21 October 1941, Air Headquarters Western Desert was created by upgrading 204 Group to command status.

Three wings operated in North Africa at first, 258 and 269 Wings operated over the front line and 262 Wing defended the Nile Delta. On 20 January 1942, the command was renamed Air Headquarters Libya; however, on 3 February it reverted to its former name of the Air Headquarters Western Desert.

=== Western Desert Air Force ===
A.H.Q. Western Desert organisation from 18 November 1941 to 19 May 1942.

A.H.Q. Western Desert – Maaten Bagush

- No. 30 Squadron (Hurricanes)
- No. 33 Squadron (Hurricanes)
- No. 60 Squadron SAAF (Marylands)
- No. 80 Squadron (Hurricanes)
- No. 113 Squadron (Blenheim Fighters)
- No. 223 Squadron (Marylands)
- No. 272 Squadron (Beaufighter)
- No. 805 Squadron FAA (Martlets)
- No. 815 Squadron FAA (Swordfish and Albacores)
- No. 826 Squadron FAA (Albacores)

253 Wing

- No. 208 Squadron (Hurricanes)
- No. 237 (Rhodesia) Squadron (Hurricanes)
- No. 451 Squadron RAAF (Hurricanes)

258 Wing

- No. 2 Squadron SAAF (Tomahawks)
- No. 3 Squadron RAAF (Tomahawks)
- No. 4 Squadron SAAF (Tomahawks)
- No. 112 Squadron (Tomahawks)
- No. 250 Squadron (Tomahawks)
- RN Squadron (Marine Tomahawks)

261 Wing

- No. 11 Squadron (Blenheims)
- No. 12 Squadron SAAF (Marylands)
- No. 21 Squadron SAAF (Marylands)
- No. 24 Squadron SAAF (Bostons)

262 Wing

- No. 1 Squadron SAAF (Hurricanes)
- No. 94 Squadron SAAF (Hurricanes)
- No. 229 Squadron (Hurricanes)
- No. 238 Squadron (Hurricanes)
- No. 260 Squadron (Hurricanes)
- No. 274 Squadron (Hurricanes)

270 Wing

- No. 8 Squadron (Blenheims)
- No. 14 Squadron (Blenheims)
- No. 45 Squadron (Blenheims)
- No. 55 Squadron (Blenheims)
- No. 84 Squadron (Blenheims)
- French Squadron Lorraine (Blenheims)

Western Desert Air Force (WDAF) was organised on 27 October 1942 as:

Subordinated to General Headquarters RAF Middle East (GHQ RAF Middle East)

- No. 3 South African Air Force (SAAF) Bomber Wing
  - 12 Squadron SAAF (24 × Martin Marylands)
  - 21 Squadron SAAF (24 × Martin Baltimores I, II & III)
  - 24 Squadron SAAF (24 × Douglas Boston III)
- No. 232 Bomber Wing
  - No. 55 Squadron RAF (24 × Baltimores I, II & III)
  - No. 223 Squadron RAF (24 × Baltimores I, II & III)
  - 82nd Bombardment Squadron USAAF (12 × Mitchell B-25C)
  - 83rd Bombardment Squadron USAAF (12 × Mitchell B-25C)
  - 434th Bombardment Squadron USAAF (12 × Mitchell B-25C)
- No. 285 Reconnaissance Wing
  - No. 2 PRU Squadron RAF (Photo Reconnaissance) (Spitfire VB)
  - 40 Squadron SAAF (Tactical Reconnaissance) (18 × Hurricane I/II/A/B)
  - 60 Squadron SAAF (Photo Reconnaissance) (12 × Marylands)
  - No. 208 Squadron RAF (Tactical Reconnaissance) (18 × Hurricane IIA/B)
  - No. 1437 Flight RAF (Strategic Reconnaissance) (8 × Baltimores I, II & III)

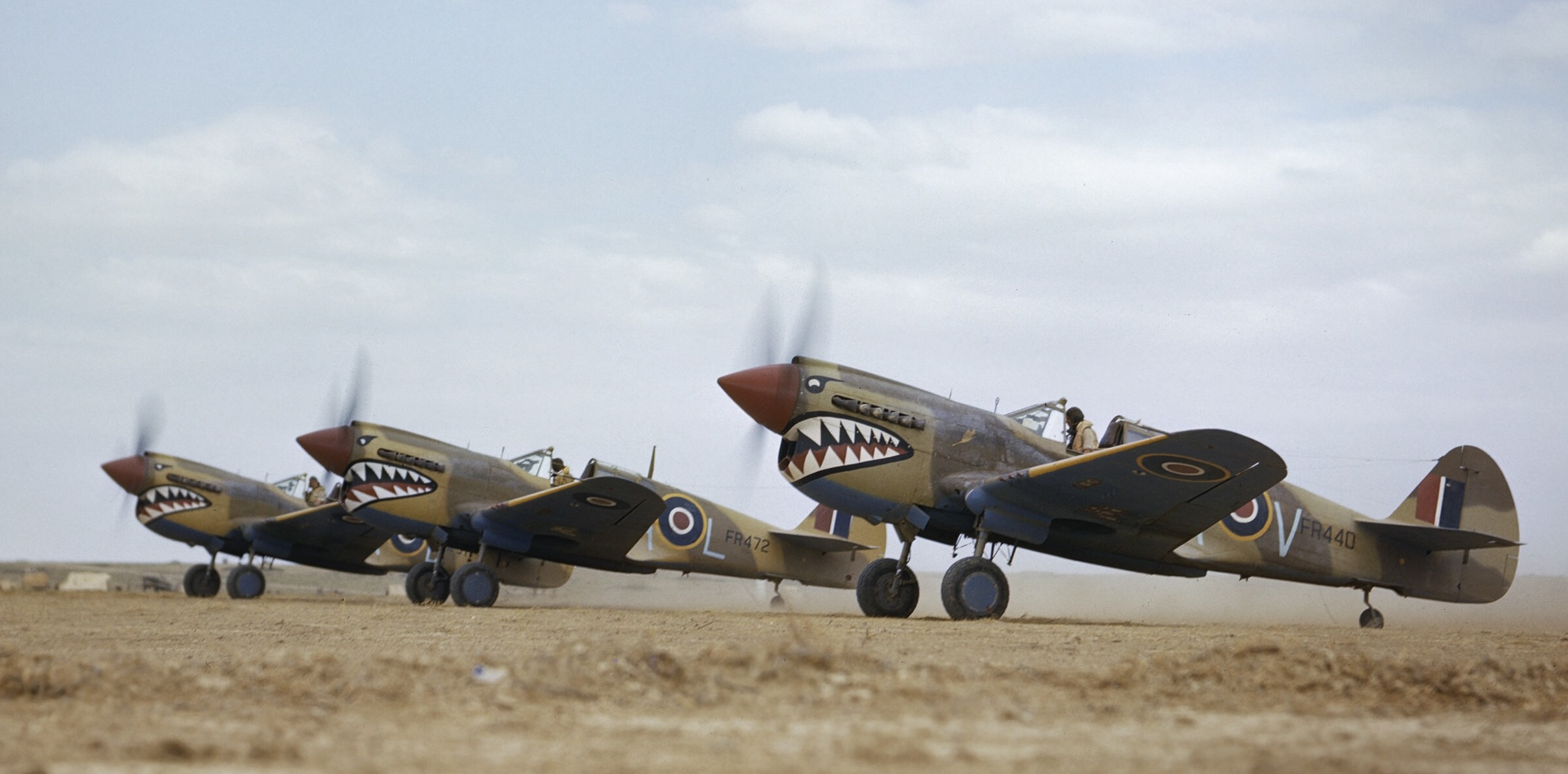
Kittyhawks of No. 112 Squadron RAF prepare to take off in Tunisia.

- No. 211 Group
  - 7 Squadron SAAF (anti-tank) (16 × Hurricane IID)
  - No. 6 Squadron RAF (anti-tank) (16 × Hurricane IID)
  - 64th Fighter Squadron USAAF (25 × P-40F Warhawks)
  - 65th Fighter Squadron USAAF (25 × P-40F Warhawks)
  - No. 233 Wing
    - 2 Squadron SAAF (16 × Kittyhawks I, II & III)
    - 4 Squadron SAAF (16 × Kittyhawks I, II & III)
    - 5 Squadron SAAF (16 × Tomahawks)
    - No. 260 Squadron RAF (16 × Kittyhawks I & IIb)
  - No. 239 Wing
    - No. 3 Squadron RAAF (16 × Kittyhawk I, II & III)
    - No. 112 Squadron RAF (16 × Kittyhawk IA)
    - No. 250 Squadron RAF (16 × Kittyhawk IIA)
    - No. 450 Squadron RAAF (16 × Kittyhawk)
    - 66th Fighter Squadron USAAF (25 × P-40F Warhawks)
  - No. 244 Wing
    - No. 145 Squadron RAF (16 × Spitfires Vb)
    - No. 601 Squadron RAF (16 × Spitfires Vb)
    - No. 73 Squadron RAF (16 × Hurricane IIc)
    - No. 92 Squadron RAF (16 × Spitfires Vb/c)
- No. 212 Group
  - No. 243 Wing
    - 1 Squadron SAAF (16 × Hurricane IIc)
    - No. 33 Squadron RAF (16 × Hurricane IIc)
    - No. 213 Squadron RAF (16 × Hurricane IIc)
    - No. 238 Squadron RAF (16 × Hurricane IIc)
  - No. 7 Wing
    - No. 80 Squadron RAF (16 × Hurricane IIc)
    - No. 127 Squadron RAF (16 × Hurricane IIb)
    - No. 335 (Greek) Squadron RAF (16 × Hurricane IIb)
    - No. 274 Squadron RAF (16 × Hurricane IIb)
  - Early in 1943 that squadron was renamed No. 462 Squadron RAAF (note Australian) despite mainly British personnel.
  - The squadron was disbanded in June 1943 but a new Australian 462 Squadron was formed late in 1943 with mainly Australian personnel.

US Desert Air Task Force

(Part of United States Army Middle East Air Force but with exception of 81st Bombardment Squadron, under WDAF operational control):

- 57th Fighter Group USAAF
  - 64th, 65th, and 66th Fighter Squadrons with P-40F Warhawks detached to RAF (see above).
- 12th Bombardment Group USAAF
  - 82nd, 83rd, and 434th Bombardment Squadrons with B-25C Mitchells detached to RAF (see above).
  - 81st Bombardment Squadron not detached to RAF
- Air Ambulance Squadron
- 835th Aviation Engineer Battalion

=== Allied restructuring ===
In January 1943, British Prime Minister Winston Churchill, American President Franklin D. Roosevelt, and their staffs reorganised the Allied air forces in the North African and Mediterranean Theater of Operations (MTO) at the Casablanca Conference. The Western Desert Air Force became a sub-command of Coningham's Northwest African Tactical Air Force (part of Northwest African Air Forces) in February 1943 and Air Vice Marshal Harry Broadhurst became its Air Officer Commanding. On 18 February 1943, the Mediterranean Air Command (MAC) was established with Air Chief Marshal Sir Arthur Tedder in charge of all Allied air forces in the Mediterranean Theater of Operations (MTO). When the Allied forces invaded Sicily (Operation Husky) on 10 July 1943, Desert Air Force (DAF) was created by simply renaming Western Desert Air Force. For Operation Husky, DAF contained Advanced and Rear elements.

Advanced Headquarters, Desert Air Force,
No. 211 (Offensive Fighter) Group with Spitfires:

No. 244 Wing	No. 322 Wing	No. 324 Wing
1 Squadron SAAF	No. 81 Squadron	No. 72 Squadron (RAF)
No. 92 Squadron (RAF)	No. 154 Squadron (RAF)	No. 93 Squadron (RAF)
No. 417 Squadron (RCAF)	No. 232 Squadron (RAF)	No. 111 Squadron (RAF)
No. 601 Squadron (RAF); Sqn. Ldr. Stanisław Skalski	No. 242 Squadron (RAF)	No. 152 Squadron (RAF)
No. 145 Squadron (RAF) Polish Fighting Team P.F.T. Flight "C" "Skalski Circus"	No. 43 Squadron (RAF)	No. 243 Squadron (RAF)

Other Advanced units included:

- 40 Tactical Reconnaissance Squadron, SAAF (Spitfires)
- 1/2 No. 600 Squadron (TEF/N) operating on Malta under A.O.C. Malta (Beaufighters)
- No. 325 Wing RAF (Beaufighters)
  - 1/2 No. 600 Squadron
  - No. 153 Squadron (TEF/N) operating from North Africa

Rear Headquarters, Desert Air Force. Operating from Tripoli Area

No. 239 Wing RAF (Kittyhawks)	57th Fighter Group USAAF (P-40s)	79th Fighter Group USAAF (P-40s)
No. 3 Squadron RAAF	64th Squadron	85th Squadron
No. 112 Squadron RAF	65th Squadron	86th Squadron
No. 450 Squadron RAAF	66th Squadron	87th Squadron
No. 250 Squadron RAF		
No. 260 Squadron RAF

- No. 285 Wing RAF (Reconnaissance)
  - No. 1437 Flight RAF (SR) (Baltimores)
  - 60 Squadron SAAF
  - No. 682 Squadron RAF

(60 and 682 were Photographic Reconnaissance (PR) squadrons assigned from the Northwest African Photographic Reconnaissance Wing)

- Other RAF units
  - No. 6 Squadron (TD) (Hurricane IIDs)
  - No. 249 Air Transport Wing

DAF continued to provide close tactical support to the British Eighth Army as a subordinate element of NATAF. MAC was disbanded in December 1943 and reorganised into the Mediterranean Allied Air Forces (MAAF) which absorbed NAAF, RAFM, and possibly some units of RAFME. DAF, still under Broadhurst, became a component of the Mediterranean Allied Tactical Air Force (MATAF) under Major General John K. Cannon. The successful tactical air support of ground forces in Egypt and Libya pioneered by Tedder and Coningham was the model for the establishment of NAAF at the Casablanca Conference and the tri-force (strategic, coastal, tactical) elements of this air interdiction model were retained in the new MAAF structure which generally persisted until the end of the Second World War. DAF existed until 30 June 1946, when it was renamed the Advanced AHQ Italy.

== Aircraft ==
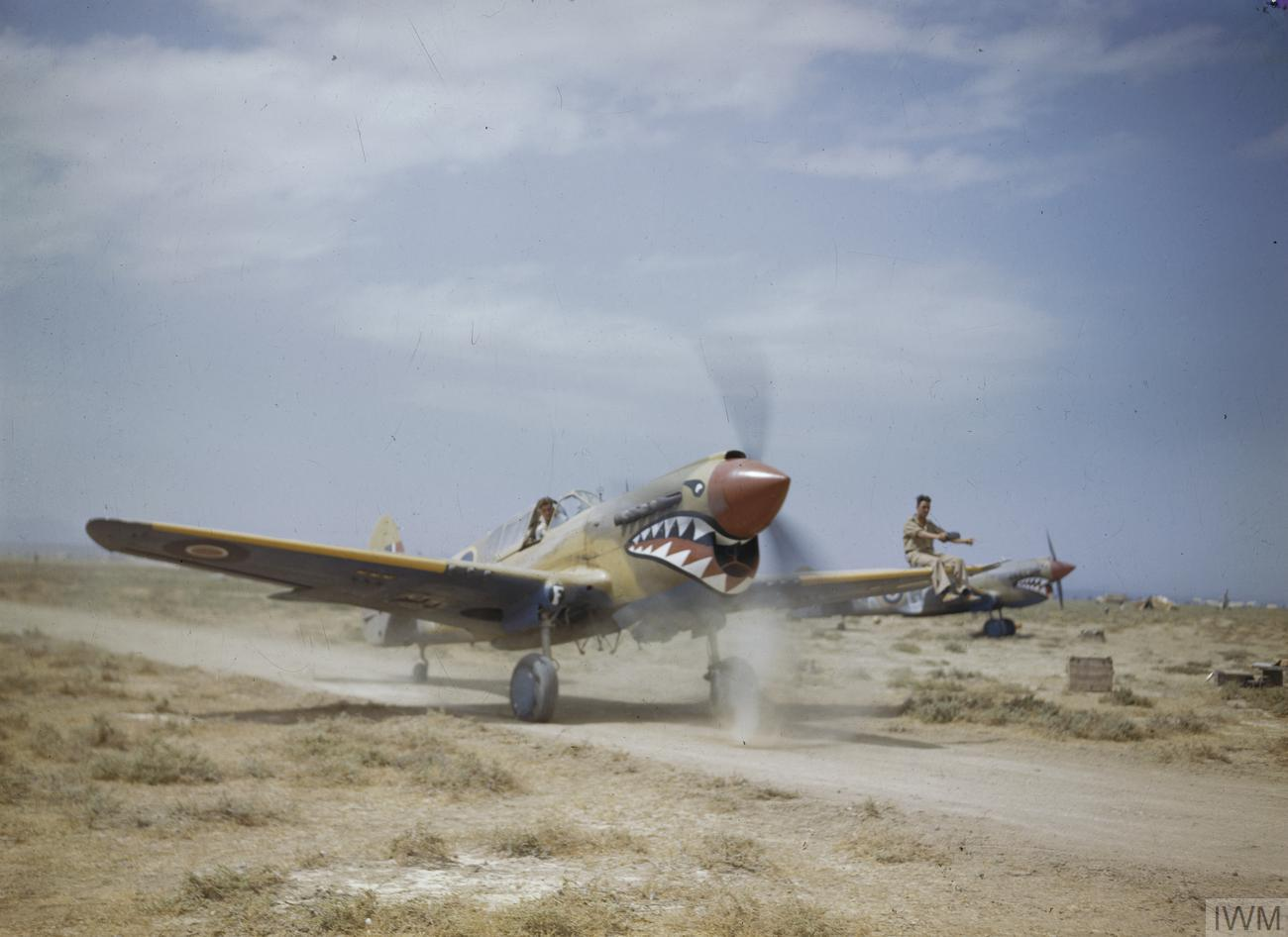
1943, A Kittyhawk from No. 112 Squadron RAF, taxiing through scrub at Medenine, Tunisia. The squadron was the first in any air force to use the "shark mouth" logo on P-40s.

The air defence of Britain always received priority and the DAF was generally equipped with older aircraft types. Initially equipped with obsolete types like the Gloster Gladiator biplane fighter and the Bristol Blenheim light bomber, the DAF made a good showing against the equally obsolete Italian Air Force. After the direct threat to Britain receded, newer types were assigned to the DAF, such as the Hawker Hurricane and Douglas Boston medium bomber in 1941.

US-built P-40 Tomahawks/Kittyhawks also went to the DAF as it was unsuited to European operations which were generally fought at much higher altitudes and against more formidable opposition. The P-40 was used initially as an air superiority fighter but it was also adapted (and found to be ideally suited) to ground attack missions.

The DAF always outnumbered its Axis opponents and concentrated on long-range interdiction and direct tactical Eighth Army support. Unfortunately, these tactics meant that the faster Messerschmitt Bf 109s of Jadgdeschwader 27 usually had the advantage of height and surprise over the low-level, slow-flying DAF fighters and losses were correspondingly high. In 1942, the DAF reorganised its tactics and introduced better aircraft. Spitfires were eventually used for air superiority, becoming operational in August 1942, which allowed the DAF to gain air superiority.

The DAF adapted the Luftwaffe concept of tactical air support by using fighter-bombers linked via radio to "Forward air controllers" attached to Army units. The DAF improved the concept by introducing "cab ranks" of fighter-bombers in the air waiting to be called on. The DAF provided air support to the Eighth Army until the end of the war, fighting over Egypt, Libya, Tunisia, Sicily and mainland Italy. The tactical concepts which had proven so successful in the latter part of the North African campaign were adopted with even greater success during the Invasion of Europe in 1944.

== Personnel ==
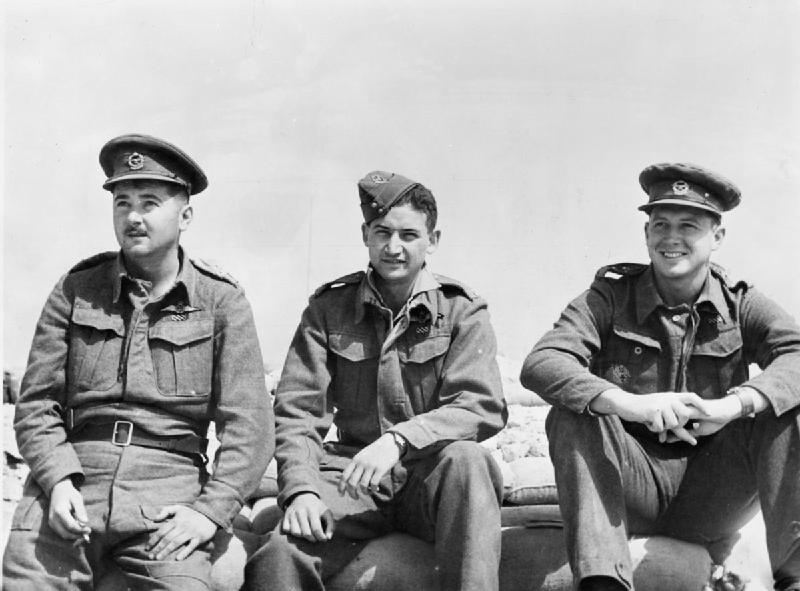
March/April 1942, Landing Ground 121, Egypt. Lieutenant Robin Pare (left), Major John "Jack" Frost (centre) and Captain Andrew Duncan (right) of 5 Squadron SAAF, Desert Air Force. All three were killed or missing in action by the end of June. Frost, the squadron commander, was the highest scoring ace in an SAAF unit during the Second World War.

The SAAF provided over a dozen squadrons to the DAF. This was their main theatre of operations, as the South African government had decided their military should not operate outside Africa. Between April 1941 and May 1943, the 11 squadrons of the SAAF flew almost 34,000 sorties and claimed 342 enemy aircraft destroyed.

The Australian contribution included fighter and bomber squadrons, including No. 3 Squadron RAAF, which arrived in North Africa in late 1940 and served with the DAF until the closing stages of the war in Europe. By that time, 3 Sqn had the most substantial service record of any DAF squadron, including the greatest number of kills (217 claims). Many Australian pilots also flew with RAF or SAAF squadrons in the DAF.

Many exiles from Occupied Europe—especially Polish airmen— flew in DAF squadrons. No. 112 Squadron RAF was largely made up of Poles and in 1943, the Polish Fighting Team ("Skalski's Circus") was attached to No. 145 Squadron RAF.

From July 1942, the United States Army Middle East Air Force (USAMEAF, Major-General Lewis H. Brereton) attached USAAF personnel from the 57th Fighter Group and 12th Bombardment Group to DAF fighter and bomber units, as "observers". This was technically a violation of the Arnold-Portal-Towers agreement, which included a stipulation that American personnel should serve only in US units. From mid-September, the P-40 Warhawk squadrons of the 57th FG and the B-25 squadrons of the 12th BG were officially attached to DAF units. On 12 November 1942, USAMEAF was dissolved and replaced by the 9th Air Force, although some US units remained with Commonwealth formations for some time.

British and Commonwealth personnel who served with the DAF were awarded the Africa Star campaign medal with the clasp 'North Africa 1942–43', denoted by a silver rosette when only ribbons were worn.

== Commanders ==
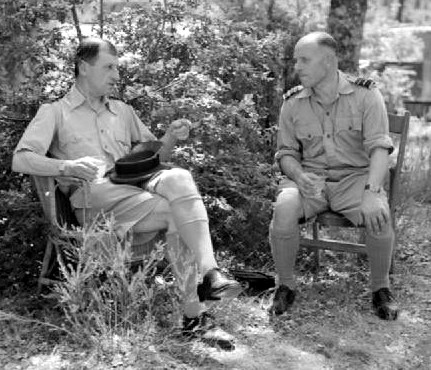
Air Chief Marshal Sir Charles Portal, Chief of the Air Staff, in conversation with Air Vice-Marshal William Dickson, AOC Desert Air Force, 28 August 1944

The following were the air officers commanding either the Air Headquarters Western Desert or the Desert Air Force:

- AHQ Western Desert
  - 21 October 1941 Air Vice-Marshal Arthur Coningham (also AOC AHQ Libya)
  - 31 January 1943 Air Vice-Marshal Harry Broadhurst
- Desert Air Force
  - 10 July 1943 Air Vice-Marshal Broadhurst
  - 6 April 1944 Air Vice-Marshal William Dickson
  - 3 December 1944 Air Vice-Marshal Robert Foster
  - 30 August 1945 Air Commodore Colin Falconer

== See also ==
- Balkan Air Force
- List of North African airfields during World War II
- List of Royal Air Force commands
