= 86th Fighter-Interceptor Squadron =

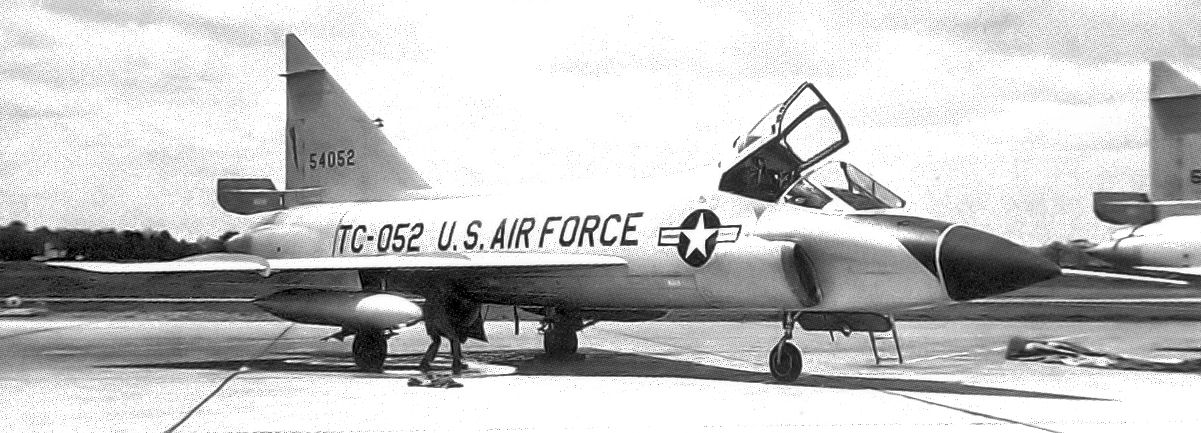
- Convair TF-102A Delta Dagger, AF Ser. No. 55-4052, of the 86th Fighter-Interceptor Squadron
- Active: 1942–1947; 1952–1960
- Country: United States
- Branch: United States Air Force
- Type: Fighter-Interceptor
- Role: Air Defense
- Engagements: Mediterranean Theater of Operations
- Decorations: Distinguished Unit Citation

Insignia
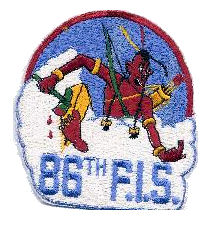
- Patch including the 86th Fighter-Interceptor Squadron Emblem

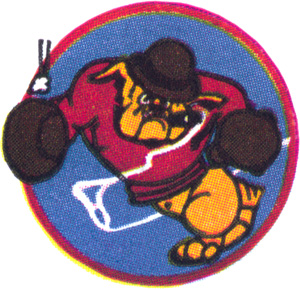
- 86th Fighter Squadron emblem

The 86th Fighter-Interceptor Squadron is an inactive United States Air Force unit. Its last assignment was with the 79th Fighter Group at Youngstown Air Force Base, Ohio, where it was inactivated on 1 March 1960.

The squadron was first activated shortly after the United States entered World War II as the 86th Pursuit Squadron. As the 86th Fighter Squadron It saw combat in the Mediterranean Theater of Operations and earned two Distinguished Unit Citations. After the end of the war it became an element of the occupation forces until returning to the United States, where it was inactivated in 1947.

It was activated once again to replace an Air National Guard squadron that had been mobilized for the Korean War and carried out the air defense of the Great Lakes area for the next eight years.

== History ==
=== World War II ===
The squadron was first activated in early 1942 at Dale Mabry Field, Florida as the 86th Pursuit Squadron, one of the original three squadrons of the 79th Pursuit Group. Its initial cadre was drawn from the 56th and 81st Fighter Groups. The squadron was redesignated the 86th Fighter Squadron in May 1942. The unit trained in the United States, then moved to Egypt by sea via Brazil in October–November 1942, where it became part of Ninth Air Force.

The squadron trained with P-40 Warhawks while moving westward in the wake of the British drive across Egypt and Libya to Tunisia. By escorting bombers, attacking enemy shipping, and supporting ground forces, the 86th took part in the Allied operations that defeated Axis forces in North Africa, captured Pantelleria, and conquered Sicily. The squadron was awarded a Distinguished Unit Citation (DUC) for its support of British Eighth Army during that period, March–August 1943.

The squadron became part of Twelfth Air Force in August 1943 and continued to support the British Eighth Army by attacking troop concentrations, gun positions, bridges, roads, and rail lines in southern Italy. It operated in the area of the Anzio beachhead from January to March 1944. The unit participated in the drive on Rome from March to June 1944, and converted to P-47 Thunderbolts during that time. It flew escort and strafing missions in southern France during August and September 1944, and afterward returned to Italy and engaged in interdiction and close air support operations in northern Italy. The 86th received a second DUC for numerous missions flown at minimum altitude in intense flak to help pierce the enemy line at the Santerno River in Italy in April 1945. Squadron pilots were credited with twenty-eight victories over enemy aircraft during World War II.

The squadron remained overseas as part of United States Air Forces in Europe after the war as part of the occupation forces. It was transferred, without personnel and equipment, to the US in June 1947 and inactivated on 15 July 1947.

=== Cold War Air Defense ===
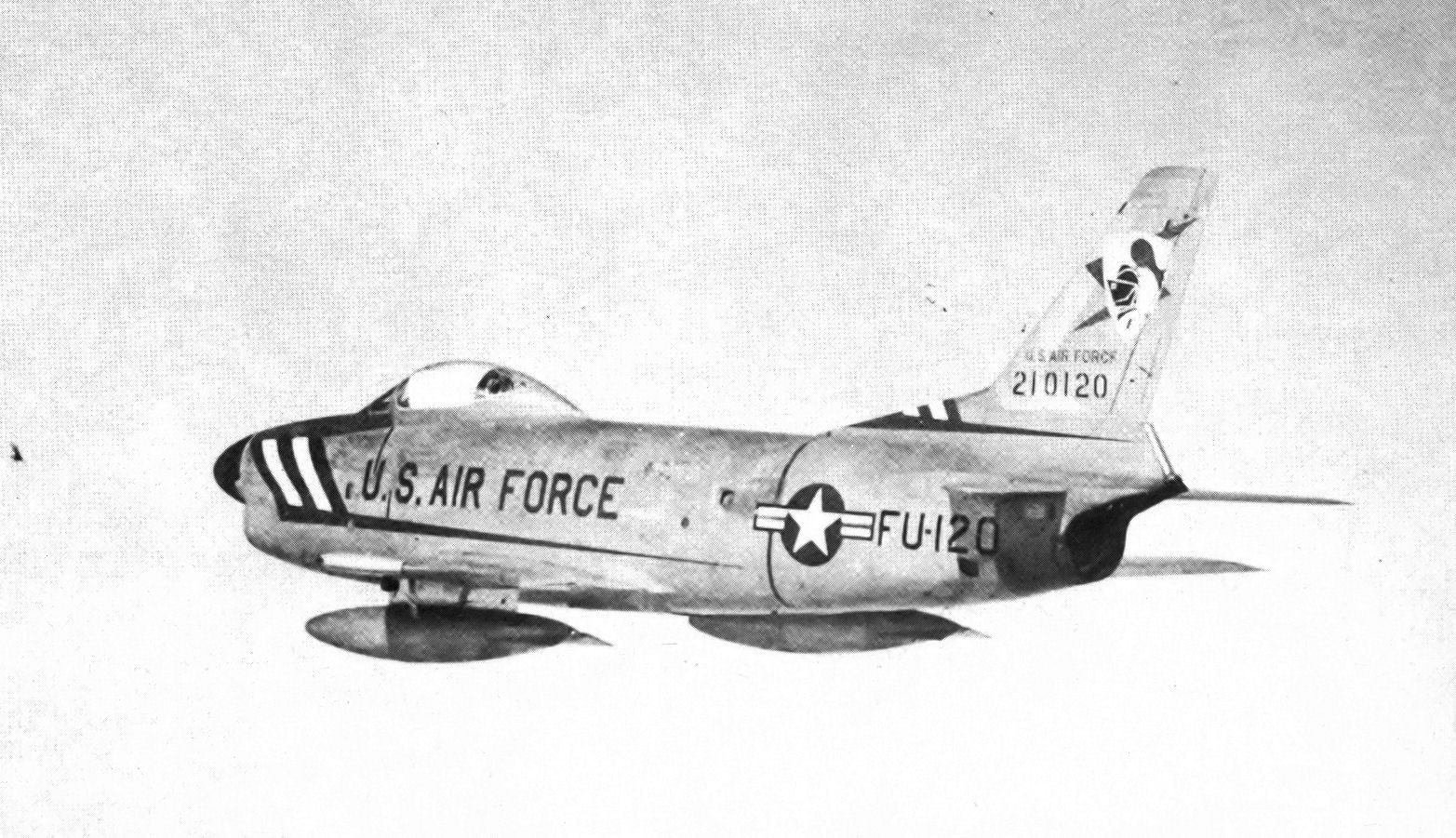
North American F-86D Sabre 52-10120, at Youngstown Airport, Ohio, 1955

The squadron was redesignated the 86th Fighter-Interceptor Squadron and activated in November 1952 at Youngstown Municipal Airport, where it replaced the federalized 166th Fighter-Interceptor Squadron, which was released to the Ohio Air National Guard. As an element of Air Defense Command (ADC) it was responsible for air defense of the Great Lakes area, initially with the Republic F-84 Thunderjets it inherited from the 166th.

Three months later ADC reorganized it dispersed fighter bases and the 86th Fighter-Interceptor Squadron was assigned to the 502d Air Defense Group, which assumed control of ADC operational and support elements at Youngstown. In July the squadron upgraded to radar equipped and rocket armed North American F-86D Sabres at Youngstown.

In August 1955 ADC implemented Project Arrow, which was designed to bring back on the active list the fighter units which had compiled memorable records in the two world wars. At Youngstown, the squadron's World War II headquarters, the 79th Fighter Group assumed the personnel and equipment of the 502d Air Defense Group, which was simultaneously inactivated.

In September 1957 the 86th traded its Sabres for AIM-4 Falcon armed Convair F-102 Delta Dagger aircraft equipped with data link for interception control through the Semi-Automatic Ground Environment system. The Air Force transferred command of Youngstown MAP from ADC to Continental Air Command on 1 March 1960 and the 79th Fighter Group and its components inactivated that date.

== Lineage ==
- Constituted as the 86th Pursuit Squadron (Interceptor) on 13 January 1942

Activated on 9 February 1942
Redesignated 86th Fighter Squadron (Single Engine) on 15 May 1942
Inactivated on 15 July 1947

- Redesignated 86th Fighter-Interceptor Squadron on 11 September 1952

Activated on 1 November 1952
Inactivated on 1 March 1960

=== Assignments ===
- 79th Pursuit Group (later Fighter Group), 9 February 1942 – 15 July 1947
- 4708th Defense Wing, 1 November 1952
- 502d Air Defense Group, 16 February 1953
- 79th Fighter Group, 18 August 1955 – 1 March 1960

=== Stations ===
- Dale Mabry Field, Florida, 9 February 1942
- Morris Field, North Carolina, 1 May 1942
- Hillsgrove Army Air Field, Rhode Island, 23 June 1942 – 28 September 1942
- Egypt 18 November 1942 (Note: The squadron was located at Alexandria by 1 January 1943. "Abstract, History of 79th Ftr Gp CY 1943". Air Force History Index.)
- Al Amirya (Landing Ground LG-174), Egypt 19 November 1942
- Gazala, Libya (Landing Ground LG-150), 24 January 1943
- Daraugh North Landing Ground Libya, 7 February 1943
- Castel Benito Airdrome, Libya, 27 March 1943
- Causeway Airdrome, Tunisia 13 March 1943
- Sidi El Hani Landing Ground, Tunisia, 17 April 1943
- El Haouaria Airfield, Tunisia, 2 June 1943
- Bou Grara Airfield, Tunisia, 6 June 1943
- Causeway Airdrome, Tunisia 14 June 1943
- Malta, c. 4 July 1943
- Syracuse, Sicily, Italy c. 18 July 1943
- Cassibile Landing Ground, Sicily, Italy, 26 July 1943
- Palagonia Landing Ground, Sicily, Italy, 30 July 1943
- Isole Landing Ground, Sicily, Italy, 13 September 1943
- Pisticci Landing Ground, Italy, 24 September 1943
- Penny Post Landing Ground, Italy 26 September 1943
- Madna Airfield, Italy, c. 19 November 1943
- Capodichino Airport, Italy, 16 January 1944
- Pomigliano Airfield, Italy, 1 May 1944
- Serragia Airfield, (Note: The 79th group moved to Corsica by ship.) Corsica 20 June 1944
- St. Raphael/Frejus Airfield (Y-12), France c. 25 August 1944
- Valance Airfield (Y-23), France, 30 September 1944 (Note: The group history identifies this field as "Bron Airdrome".)
- Iesi Airfield, Italy, 4 October 1944
- Fano Airfield, Italy, 5 December 1944
- Cesenatico Airfield, Italy, 21 March 1945
- AAF Station Hoersching (later Hoersching Air Base), Austria, 26 July 1945 – 25 June 1947
- Langley Field, Virginia, 25 June 1947 – 15 July 1947
- Youngstown Municipal Airport, Ohio, 1 November 1952 – 1 March 1960

=== Aircraft ===
- Curtiss P-40 Warhawk, 1942–1944
- Republic P-47 Thunderbolt, 1944–1947
- Republic F-84C Thunderjet, 1952–1953
- North American F-86D Sabre, 1953–1957
- Convair F-102 Delta Dagger, 1957–1960

=== Awards and campaigns ===
Award streamer	Award	Dates	Notes
	Distinguished Unit Citation	March 1943 – 17 August 1943	86th Fighter Squadron, North Africa and Sicily
	Distinguished Unit Citation	16 April 1945 – 20 April 1945	86th Fighter Squadron, Italy

Campaign Streamer	Campaign	Dates	Notes
	Air Combat, EAME Theater		86th Fighter Squadron
	Egypt-Libya		86th Fighter Squadron
	Tunisia		86th Fighter Squadron
	Sicily		86th Fighter Squadron
	Naples-Foggia		86th Fighter Squadron
	Anzio		86th Fighter Squadron
	Rome-Arno		86th Fighter Squadron
	Southern France		86th Fighter Squadron
	Northern Apennines		86th Fighter Squadron
	Po Valley		86th Fighter Squadron
	World War II Army of Occupation	2 May 1945 – 25 June 1947	86th Fighter Squadron
