= 87th Flying Training Squadron =

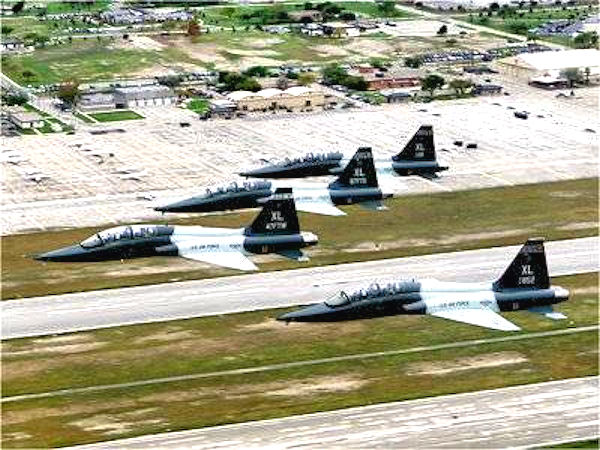
- 87th Flying Training Squadron T-38s flying over Laughlin AFB
- Active: 1917-1918; 1935-1936; 1942-1947; 1952-1955; 1956-1985; 1990 – present
- Country: United States
- Branch: United States Air Force
- Role: Pilot Training
- Part of: Air Education and Training Command; 19th Air Force; 47th Flying Training Wing; 47th Operations Group
- Garrison/HQ: Laughlin Air Force Base
- Nickname: Skeeters (World War II)
- Motto: Vigilantia est Pax Latin Vigilance is Peace
- Engagements: World War II; *North African Campaign; *Operation Husky * Operation Avalanche; *Italian Campaign; *Operation Dragoon
- Decorations: Distinguished Unit Citation; Air Force Outstanding Unit Award

Commanders
- Current commander: Lt Col Johnathan Radtke

Insignia
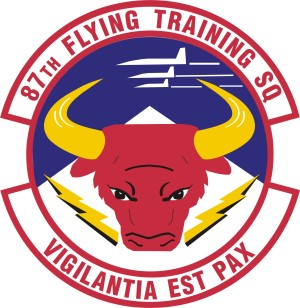
- 87th Flying Training Squadron emblem (approved 12 February 1969)

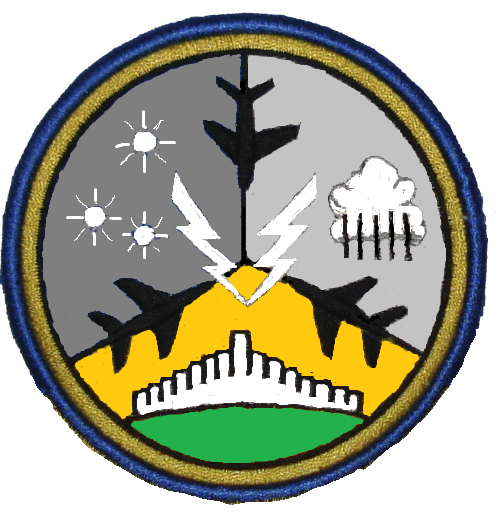
- 87th Fighter-Interceptor Squadron emblem (approved 16 July 1956

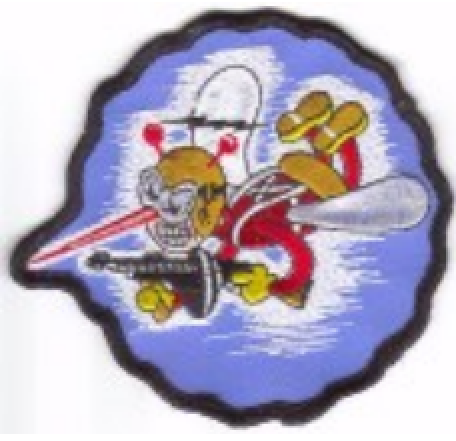
- 87th Fighter Squadron emblem

The 87th Flying Training Squadron is part of the United States Air Force 47th Flying Training Wing based at Laughlin Air Force Base, Texas. It operates T-38 Talon aircraft conducting flight training.

The squadron is one of the oldest in the United States Air Force, its origins dating to 18 August 1917 when it was organized at Selfridge Field, Mount Clemens, Michigan as a pilot training Squadron during World War I. The squadron saw combat during World War II, and became part of Air Defense Command, later Aerospace Defense Command and finally Tactical Air Command during the Cold War.

== History ==
=== World War I ===
It was activated as the 87th Aero Squadron. the 87th saw brief service in the 1910s and again in the 1930s.

=== World War II ===
It was reactivated in 1942 when it was transferred to North Africa to fight against Germany's Afrika Korps. Following the German defeat and withdrawal from North Africa the 87th participated in the Allied Invasion of Sicily and Invasion of Italy and subsequent drive up the Italian Peninsula. During the Allied offensive in Italy the squadron was briefly dispatched to support the invasion of Southern France in 1944. Following the war the 87th was stationed in Austria for a short time before its return to the United States and inactivation.

=== Air Defense Command ===
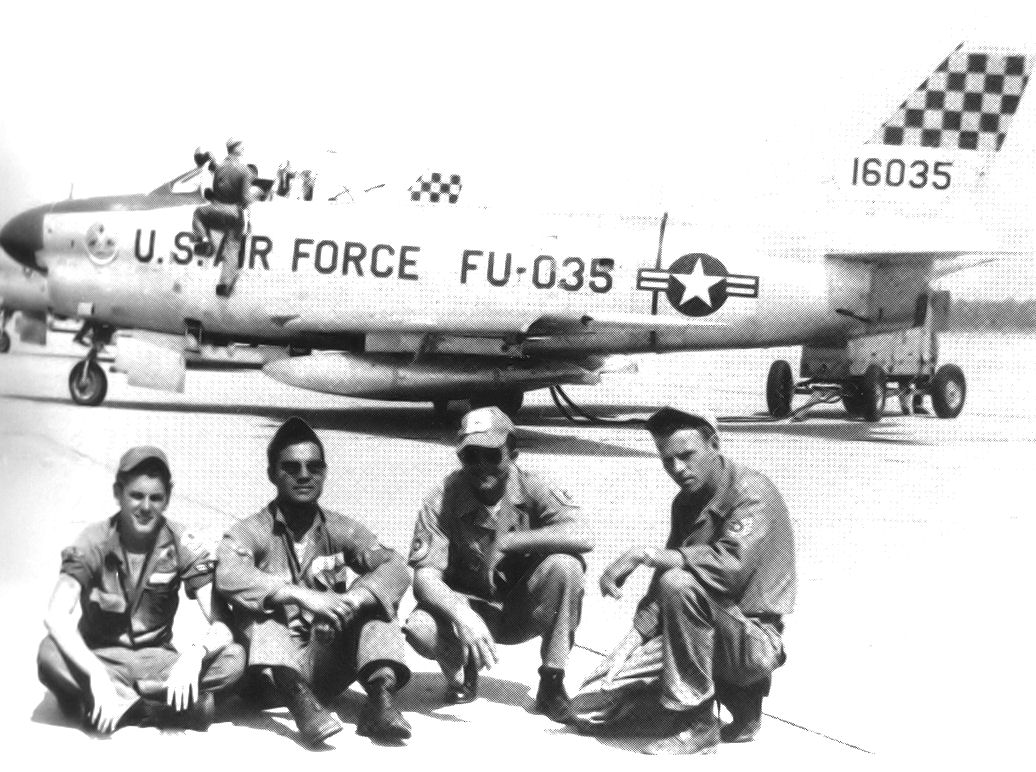
87th FIS F-86D Sabre 51-6035 at Lockbourne AFB in 1956

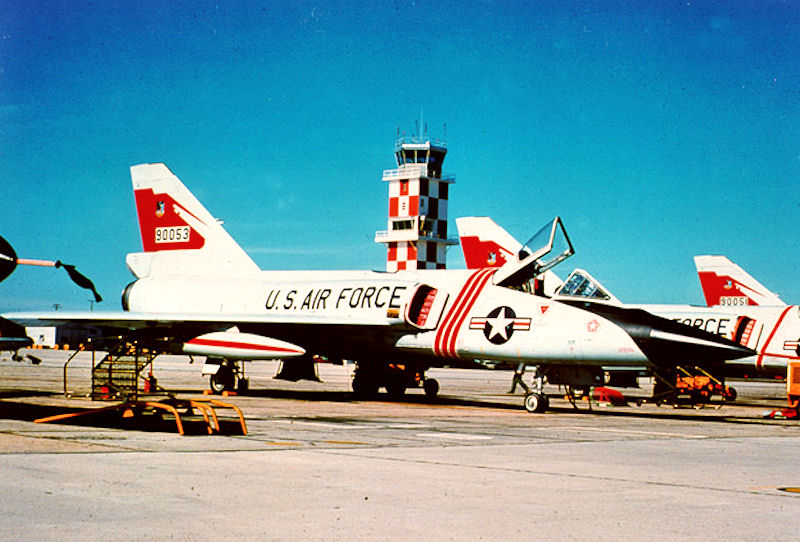
87th FIS F-106s on the flightline at K. I. Sawyer AFB in 1976 (Note: Note the American Revolution Bicentennial Celebration logo on the nose of 59-53)

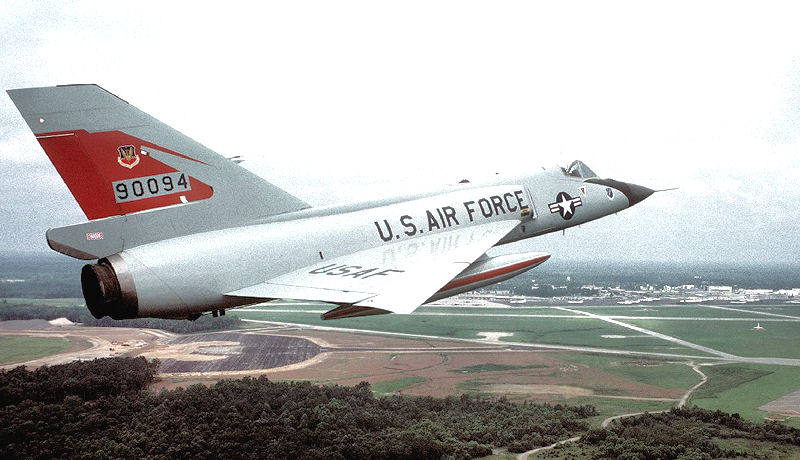
F-106 59-0094 in flight in the early 1980s (Note: Note the Tactical Air Command emblem on the tail, replacing the squadron emblem)

The 87th was again activated at Sioux City Municipal Airport, Iowa in 1952 to provide air defense of the central United States. Equipped with the North American F-51D Mustang, it was later equipped with the North American F-86D Sabre in 1953 prior to being reassigned to USAFE, stationed at RAF Bentwaters, England in 1954 assisting in the air defense of the United Kingdom.

It was returned to CONUS in 1956 at Lockbourne Air Force Base, Ohio with an air defense mission over the Ohio Valley. It was uas upgraded to the North American F-86L Sabre in 1957, an improved version of the F-86D which incorporated the Semi Automatic Ground Environment, or SAGE computer-controlled direction system for intercepts; upgraded again in 1960 to the supersonic Convair F-102 Delta Dagger interceptor.

The 87th was re-equipped with new McDonnell F-101B Voodoo supersonic interceptor, and the F-101F operational and conversion trainer in 1960. The two-seat trainer version was equipped with dual controls, but carried the same armament as the F-101B and were fully combat-capable. On 22 October 1962, before President John F. Kennedy told Americans that missiles were in place in Cuba, the squadron dispersed one-third of its force, equipped with nuclear tipped missiles to Clinton County Air Force Base at the start of the Cuban Missile Crisis. These planes returned to Lockbourne after the crisis.

The F-101Bs were transferred to the Air National Guard in 1968 and the squadron moved to Duluth International Airport, Minnesota. At Duluth, was upgraded to the Convair F-106 Delta Darts. During this period the squadron became known for its ability to perform cold weather operations.

The squadron was again moved to K. I. Sawyer Air Force Base, Michigan in 1971. Inactivated in 1985 after budget cuts forced the cancellation of its scheduled conversion to the McDonnell Douglas F-15 Eagle.

=== Flying training ===
The squadron was reactivated in 1990 and its mission changed to providing flight training. Today the squadron operates Northrop T-38 Talon aircraft providing training to pilot students on track to operate fighters or bombers.

== Lineage ==
87th Aero Squadron

- Designated as the 87th Aero Squadron and organized, on 18 August 1917

Redesignated Squadron B, Park Field on 25 July 1918

- Demobilized on 1 December 1918
- Reconstituted and consolidated on 1 December 1936 with 87th Pursuit Squadron as the 87th Pursuit Squadron

87th Pursuit Squadron

- Constituted as the 87th Pursuit Squadron on 19 February 1935
- Organized on 1 March 1935
- Inactivated 1 September 1936
- Disbanded on 1 January 1938
- Reconstituted and consolidated on 21 March 1979 with 87th Fighter-Interceptor Squadron as the 87th Fighter-Interceptor Squadron

87th Flying Training Squadron

- Constituted as the 87th Pursuit Squadron (Interceptor) on 13 January 1942

Redesignated 87th Pursuit Squadron (Interceptor) (Twin Engine) on 31 January 1942

- Activated on 9 February 1942

Redesignated 87th Fighter Squadron (Twin Engine) on 15 May 1942
Redesignated 87th Fighter Squadron, Single Engine on 21 August 1944

- Inactivated on 15 July 1947

Redesignated 87th Fighter-Interceptor Squadron on 11 September 1952

- Activated on 1 November 1952
- Inactivated on 8 September 1955
- Activated on 8 April 1956
- Inactivated on 1 October 1985

Redesignated 87th Flying Training Squadron on 9 Feb 1990

- Activated on 2 Apr 1990

=== Assignments ===
- III Corps Observation Group, 18 August 1917 – 1 December 1918
- 20th Pursuit Group (attached to Air Corps Tactical School, 1 March 1935 – 1 September 1936
- 79th Pursuit Group (later 79th Fighter Group), 9 February 1942 – 15 July 1947
- 31st Air Division, 1 Nov 1952
- 521st Air Defense Group, 16 Feb 1953
- Third Air Force. 21 December 1954 – 8 September 1955
- 58th Air Division, 8 April 1956
- 30th Air Division, 1 September 1958
- Detroit Air Defense Sector, 8 April 1959
- 34th Air Division, 1 April 1966
- 343d Fighter Group, 30 September 1968
- 23d Air Division, 28 August 1970
- 21st Air Division, 1 August 1981
- 24th Air Division, 23 September 1983 – 1 October 1985
- 47th Flying Training Wing, 2 April 1990
- 47th Operations Group, 15 December 1991 – present

=== Stations ===
- Kelly Field, Texas, 18 August 1917
- Selfridge Field, Michigan, September 1917
- Park Field, Tennessee, December 1917 - 1 December 1918
- Maxwell Field, Alabama, 1 March 1935 – 1 September 1936
- Dale Mabry Field, Florida, 9 February 1942
- Morris Field, North Carolina, 1 May 1942
- Rentschler Field, Connecticut, 25 June 1942 – 28 September 1942
- LG 174, Egypt, 12 November 1942
- Gazala (LG 150), Libya, 24 January 1943
- Darraugh North Landing Ground, Libya, c. 7 February 1943
- Castel Benito Airport, Libya, c. 27 February 1943
- Causeway Airfield, Tunisia, 13 March 1943
- Malta, 4 July 1943
- Sicily, 17 July 1943
- Southern Italy, 15 September 1943
- Salsola Airfield, Italy, 4 October 1943
- Madna Airfield, Italy, 17 November 1943
- Capodichino Airport, Italy, 17 January 1944
- Pomigliano Airfield, Italy, 1 May 1944
- Serragia Airfield, Corsica, France, 11 June 1944
- Saint Raphael-Frejus Airfield (Y-12), France, 22 August 1944
- Valence Airfield (Y-23), France, 1 September 1944
- Iesi Airfield, Italy, 4 October 1944
- Fano Airfield, Italy, 6 December 1944
- Cesenatico Airfield, Italy, 21 March 1945
- Horsching Airfield, Austria, 27 July 1945
- Langley Field, Virginia, 25 June 1947 – 15 July 1947
- Sioux City Municipal Airport, Iowa, 1 November 1952
- RAF Bentwaters, England, 13 December 1954 – 8 September 1955
- Lockbourne Air Force Base, Ohio, 8 April 1956
- Duluth International Airport, Minnesota, 30 Sep 1968
- K.I. Sawyer Air Force Base, Michigan, 1 May 1971 – 1 Oct 1985
- Laughlin Air Force Base, Texas, 2 Apr 1990 – present

=== Aircraft ===
- Curtiss P-40 Warhawk (1942–1944)
- Republic P-47 Thunderbolt (1944–1947)
- North American F-51D Mustang (1952–1953)
- North American F-86D Sabre Interceptor (1953–1955, 1956–1957)
- North American F-86L Sabre Interceptor (SAGE) (1957–1958)
- Convair F-102 Delta Dagger (1958–1960)
- McDonnell F-101B Voodoo (1960–1968)
- Convair F-106 Delta Dart (1968–1985)
- Northrop T-38 Talon (1990–present)

== See also ==
- List of American Aero Squadrons
