= 85th Test and Evaluation Squadron =

85th Test and Evaluation Squadron

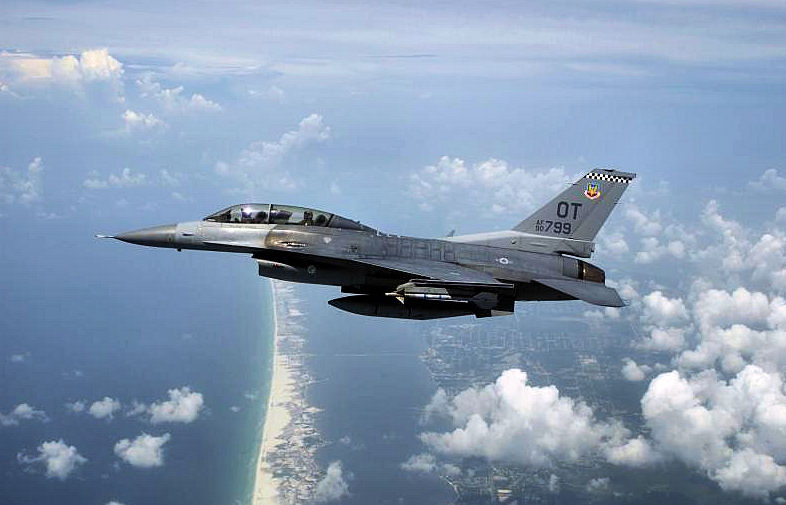
- 85th Squadron F-16D Fighting Falcon over the northwest Florida coastline during an evaluation mission in 2004 (Note: Aircraft is General Dynamics F-16D Block 40K Fighting Falcon 90-0799.)
- Active: 1942–1947; 1952–1959; 1971–present
- Country: United States
- Branch: United States Air Force
- Role: Weapon system testing and evaluation
- Part of: Air Combat Command
- Garrison/HQ: Eglin Air Force Base, Florida
- Nickname: Flying Skulls (World War II)
- Motto: The Globe's Greatest (1953–1959)
- Engagements: Mediterranean Theater of Operations
- Decorations: Distinguished Unit Citation; Air Force Outstanding Unit Award

Insignia
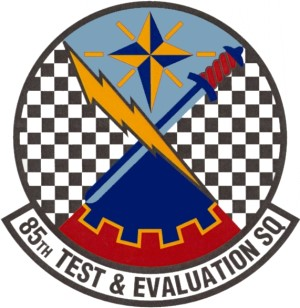
- 85th Test and Evaluation Squadron emblem (Note: Approved 8 August 1984, modified 26 May 1987. Description: On a disc divided per saltire, Light Blue, checky Black and White, Blue, checky Black and White a sword bendwise sinister point to base blade per Pale Blue and Light Blue, grip Red detailed Black guard and pommel Blue, surmounted by a Yellow lightning flash bendwise fimbriated Black, in chief a Yellow polestar shaded Blue radiant of six and in base an arc of Red arch embattled and crenelled Yellow all within a narrow Black border. On a disc divided per saltire, Light Blue, checky Black and White, Blue, checky Black and White a sword bendwise sinister point to base blade per Pale Blue and Light Blue, grip Red detailed Black guard and pommel Blue, surmounted by a Yellow lightning flash bendwise fimbriated Black, in chief a Yellow polestar shaded Blue radiant of six and in base an arc of Red arch embattled and crenelled Yellow all within a narrow Black border.)

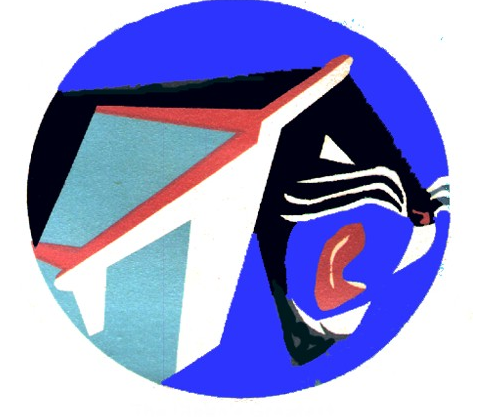
- 85 Fighter-Interceptor Sq emblem (Note: Approved 7 August 1953. Description: On a disc a futuristic aircraft red and white, passing through a light blue background into a dark blue background, in front of a snarling cat black, eye white whiskers white, nose tipped white, tongue red.)

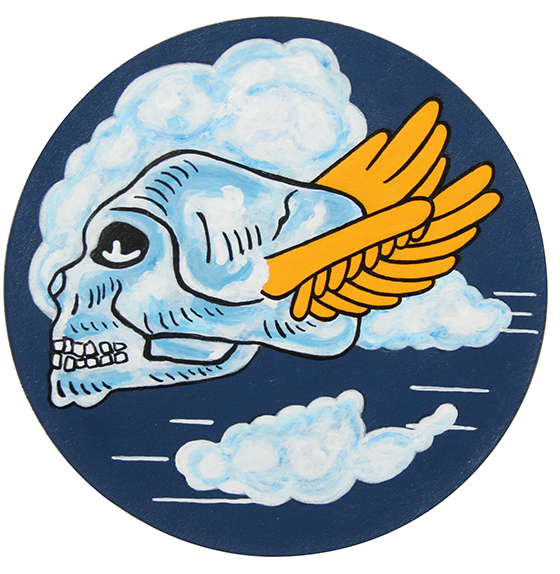
- 85th Fighter Squadron emblem (Note: Approved 26 August 1942.)

The 85th Test and Evaluation Squadron is part of the 53d Wing at Eglin Air Force Base, Florida. It conducts testing and evaluation for the F-15 Eagle, F-15E Strike Eagle, and F-16 Fighting Falcon airframes.

== Mission ==
The 85th Test and Evaluation Squadron is responsible for conducting operational test and evaluation, tactics development, and programs for F-15C, F-15E, F-15EX, and F-16CM aircraft. It uses specially instrumented aircraft to test and evaluate current and future weapons, the newest air-to ground munitions, air-to-air missiles, electronic warfare systems, and associated components and avionics.

The squadron provides operational fighter expertise to United States Air Force Headquarters, Department of Defense agencies, and the aerospace industry in developing future aircraft and in employment techniques and concepts. The 85th focuses on air-to-air missile employment and tactics, suppression and destruction of enemy air defenses and lethal precision engagement.

== History ==
=== World War II ===
Activated on 9 February 1942. Moved to Egypt, October–November 1942, and became part of Ninth Air Force.

Trained with Curtiss P-40 Warhawks's while moving westward in the wake of the British drive across Egypt and Libya to Tunisia. Although many of the unit's pilots flew combat missions with other organizations, the 79th group itself did not begin operations until March 1943. By escorting bombers, attacking enemy shipping, and supporting ground forces, took part in the Allied operations that defeated Axis forces in North Africa, captured Pantelleria, and conquered Sicily.

Assigned to Twelfth Air Force in August 1943 and continued to support British Eighth Army by attacking troop concentrations, gun positions, bridges, roads, and rail lines in southern Italy. Operated in the area of the Anzio beachhead, January–March 1944. Participated in the drive on Rome, March–June 1944, and converted to P-47 Thunderbolts during that time. Flew escort and strafing missions in southern France during August and September 1944, and afterward engaged in air interdiction and close air support operations in northern Italy.

Remained overseas as part of United States Air Forces in Europe after the war as part of the occupation force. Transferred, without personnel and equipment, to the US in June 1947. Inactivated on 15 July 1947.

=== Air Defense Command ===
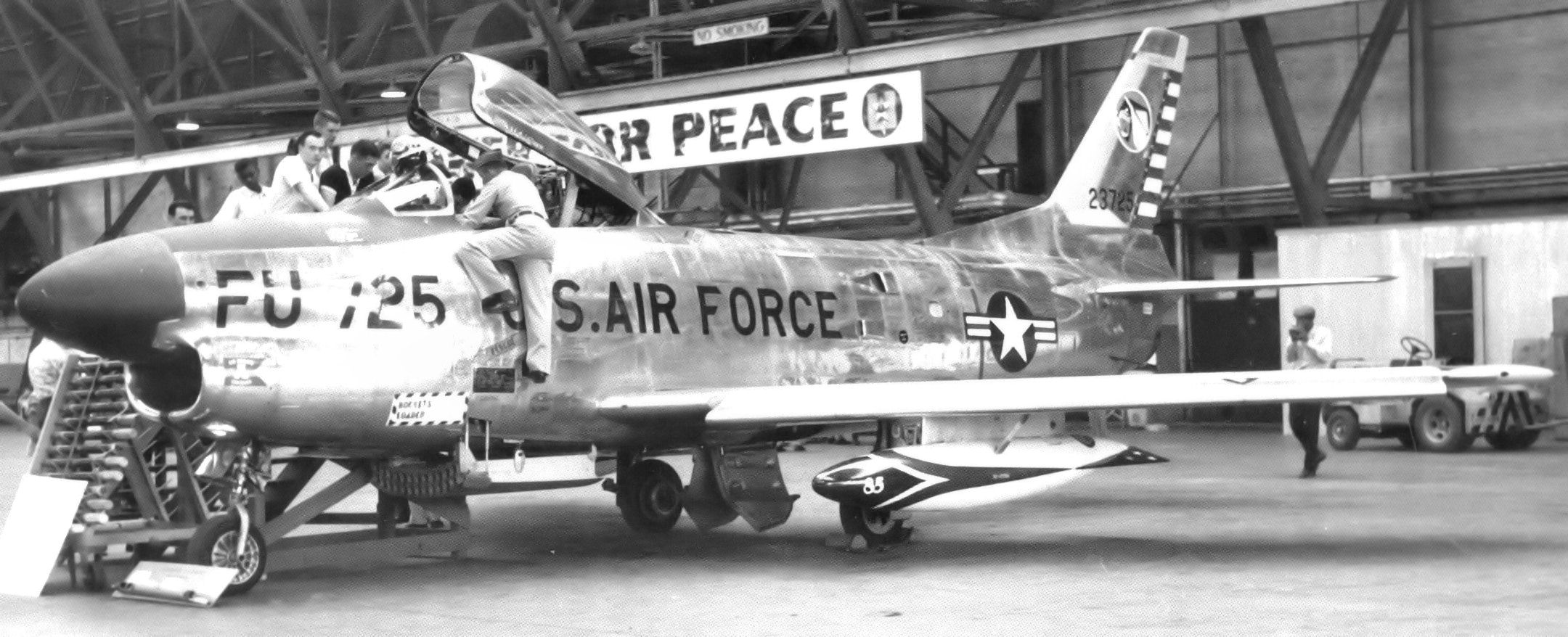
85th Fighter-Interceptor Squadron F-86D Sabre (Note: Aircraft is North American F-86D-40-NA Sabre, serial 52-3725 Photo taken in May 1957.)

Reactivated in 1952 as part of Air Defense Command as an air defense squadron, initially equipped with F-51D Mustang fighters at Scott Air Force Base, Illinois with a mission for the air defense of St Louis and the western Ohio River Valley. Re-equipped in January 1953 with F-86D Sabre Interceptors. In 1957 began re-equipping with the North American F-86L Sabre, an improved version of the F-86D which incorporated the Semi Automatic Ground Environment, or SAGE computer-controlled direction system for intercepts. The service of the F-86L destined to be quite brief, since by the time the last F-86L conversion was delivered, the type was already being phased out in favor of supersonic interceptors, inactivated on 1 March 1960.

== Lineage ==
85th Fighter-Interceptor Squadron

- Constituted as the 85th Pursuit Squadron (Interceptor) on 13 January 1942

Activated on 9 February 1942
Redesignated 85th Pursuit Squadron (Interceptor) (Twin Engine) on 31 January 1942
Redesignated 85th Fighter Squadron (Twin Engine) on 15 May 1942
Redesignated 85th Fighter Squadron on 10 September 1942
Redesignated 85th Fighter Squadron, Single Engine on 21 August 1944
Inactivated on 15 July 1947

- Redesignated 85th Fighter-Interceptor Squadron on 11 September 1952

Activated on 1 November 1952
Inactivated on 1 July 1959

- Consolidated on 15 December 1991 with the 4485th Test Squadron as the 4485th Test Squadron

85th Test and Evaluation Squadron

- Designated as the 4485th Test Squadron and activated on 12 April 1971.
- Consolidated on 15 December 1991 with the 85th Fighter-Interceptor Squadron

Redesignated 85th Test and Evaluation Squadron on 1 December 1991

=== Assignments ===
- 79th Pursuit (later, 79th Fighter) Group, 9 February 1942 – 15 July 1947
- 33d Air Division, 1 November 1952
- 20th Air Division, 1 March 1956 – 1 July 1959
- USAF Tactical Air Warfare Center, 12 April 1971
- 4443d Test and Evaluation Group (later 79th Test and Evaluation Group, 53d Test and Evaluation Group), 1 August 1988 – Present

=== Bases stationed ===
- Dale Mabry Field, Florida, 9 February 1942
- Morris Field, North Carolina, 1 May 1942
- East Boston Airport, Massachusetts, 23 June 1942
- Bedford Municipal Airport, Massachusetts, 1 July 1942 – 28 September 1942
- Kasfareet Landing Ground, Egypt (LG-212), 12 November 1942
- Gazala Landing Ground, Libya (LG-149), 24 January 1943
- Sidi el Hani Landing Ground, Tunisia, 27 April 1943
- Causeway Landing Ground, Tunisia, 2 June 1943
- RAF Valletta, Malta, 6 July 1943
- Syracuse Airfield, Sicily, Italy, 18 July 1943
- Cassabile Landing Ground, Sicily, Italy, 26 July 1943
- Palagonia Landing Ground, Sicily, Italy, 30 July 1943
- Isole Landing Ground, Crotone, Italy, 15 September 1943
- Salsola Airfield, Italy, 5 October 1943
- Madna Airfield, Italy, 19 November 1943
- Capodichino Airport, Italy, 16 January 1944
- Pomigliano Airfield, Pomigliano d'Arco, Italy, 30 April 1944
- Serragia Airfield, Corsica, France, 11 June 1944
- Saint Raphaël-Frejus Airport, France (Y-12), 22 August 1944
- Valence, France (Y-23), 30 September 1944
- Iesi Airfield, Italy, 5 October 1944
- Fano Airfield, Italy, 5 December 1944
- Cesenatico Airfield, Italy, 24 March 1945
- Hörsching Airfield, Austria, 26 July 1945 –
- Langley Field, Virginia, 25 June 1947 – 15 July 1947
- Scott Air Force Base, Illinois, 1 November 1952 – 1 July 1959
- Eglin Air Force Base, Florida, 12 April 1971 – Present

== Aircraft operated ==
- P-40 Warhawk (1942–1944)
- P-47 Thunderbolt (1944–1947)
- F-51 Mustang (1952–1953)
- F-86D Sabre Interceptor (1953–1957)
- F-86L Sabre Interceptor (SAGE) (1957–1959)
- F-4 Phantom II (1971 – )
- RF-4 Phantom II (1971 – )
- A-10 Thunderbolt II (1977 – present)
- F-15 Eagle (1976 – present)
- F-15E Strike Eagle (1988 – present)
- F-16 Fighting Falcon (1978 – present)
- F-15EX Eagle II (2021–present)

== See also ==
- List of North African airfields during World War II
- Advanced Landing Ground
