= 502d Air Defense Group =

Disbanded United States Air Force organization

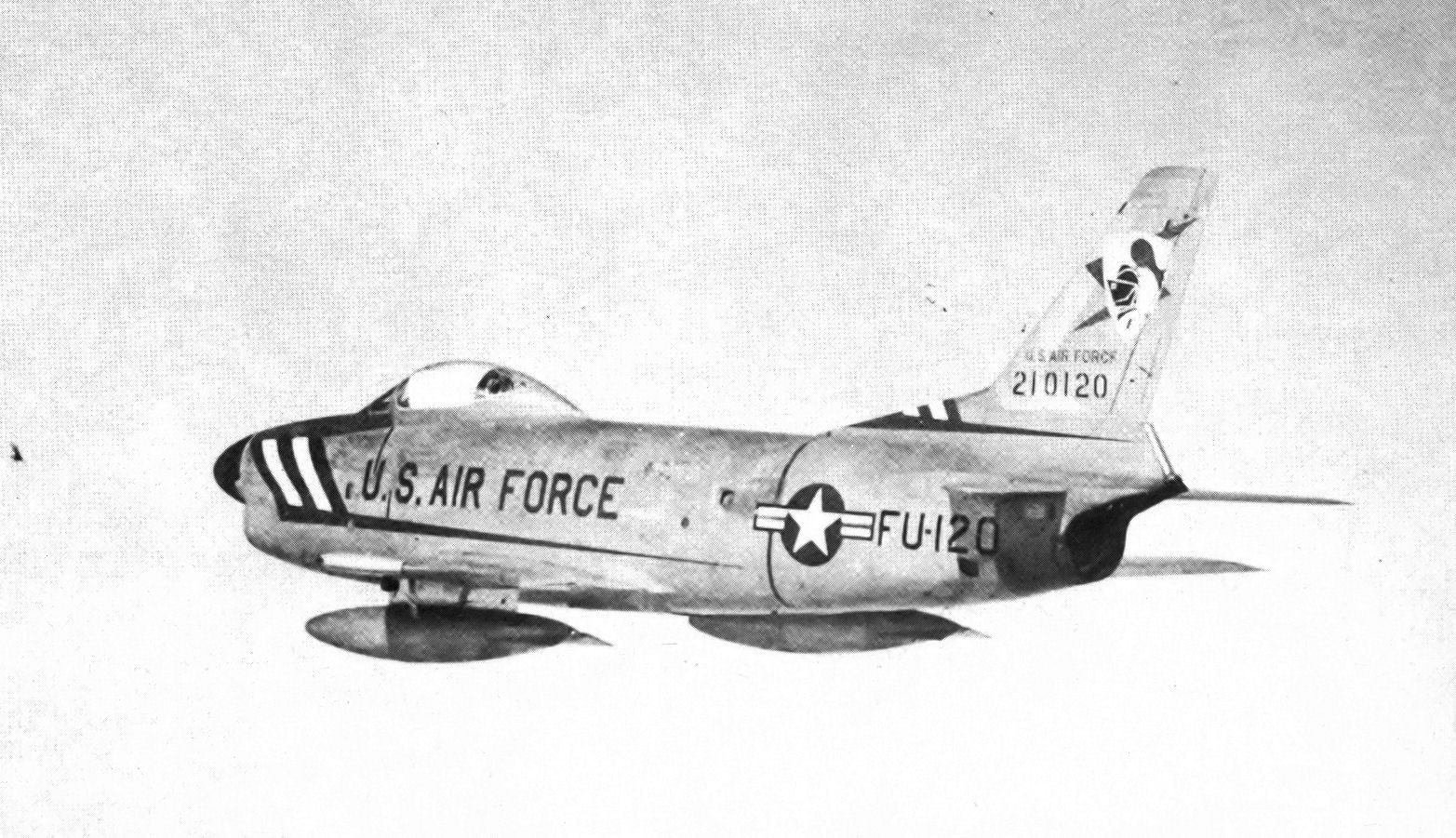
- F-86D Sabre of the Group's 86th FIS stationed at Youngstown Municipal Airport, Ohio (Note: Aircraft is North American F-86D-50-NA Sabre, serial 52-10120 Baugher, Joe (29 March 2023). "1952 USAF Serial Numbers". Joe Baugher.)
- Active: 1945; 1953-1955
- Country: United States
- Branch: United States Air Force
- Type: Fighter interceptor
- Role: Air defense

The 502d Air Defense Group is a disbanded United States Air Force organization. Its last assignment was with Air Defense Command (ADC)'s 4708th Air Defense Wing, at Youngstown Municipal Airport, Ohio. It was inactivated on 18 August 1955.

The group was originally activated as a support group at the end of World War II and provided logistics and administrative support for the 404th Fighter Group in Germany until returning to the United States, where it was inactivated.

The group was activated once again in 1953, when ADC established it as the headquarters for a dispersed fighter-interceptor squadron and the medical, aircraft maintenance, and administrative squadrons supporting it. It was replaced in 1955 when ADC transferred its mission, equipment, and personnel to the 79th Fighter Group in a project that replaced air defense groups commanding fighter squadrons with fighter groups with distinguished records during World War II.

== History ==
=== World War II ===
The group was activated as the 502d Air Service Group toward the end of World War II shortly after V-E Day in a reorganization of Army Air Forces (AAF) support groups in which the AAF replaced service groups that included personnel from other branches of the Army and supported two combat groups with air service groups including only Air Corps units. It was designed to support a single combat group. Its 920th Air Engineering Squadron provided maintenance that was beyond the capability of the combat group, its 744th Air Materiel Squadron handled all supply matters, and its Headquarters & Base Services Squadron provided other support. The group supported the 404th Fighter Group in Germany in 1945 until returning to the US for inactivation. The group was disbanded in 1948.

=== Cold War ===
During the Cold War, the group was redesignated as the 502d Air Defense Group, reconstituted and activated at Youngstown Municipal Airport in 1953 to provide air defense of Pittsburgh, western Pennsylvania and eastern Ohio area. It was assigned the 86th Fighter-Interceptor Squadron, which was already stationed at Youngstown Municipal Airport, flying Republic F-84 Thunderjets. as its operational component. The 86th had previously been assigned directly to the 4708th Defense Wing. In July 1953, the 86th replaced its F-84s with Folding-Fin Aerial Rocket armed and radar equipped North American F-86 Sabres. The group replaced the 88th Air Base Squadron as USAF host unit at Youngstown. It was assigned three squadrons to perform its support responsibilities. It was inactivated and replaced by 79th Fighter Group (Air Defense) in 1955 as part of Air Defense Command's Project Arrow, which was designed to bring back on the active list the fighter units which had compiled memorable records in the two world wars. The group was disbanded again in 1984.

== Lineage ==
- Constituted as 502nd Air Service Group on 16 December 1944

Activated on 1 June 1945
Inactivated c. 9 November 1945
Disbanded on 8 October 1948

- Reconstituted on 21 January 1953 and redesignated 502d Air Defense Group

Activated on 16 February 1953
Inactivated on 18 August 1955
Disbanded on 27 September 1984

=== Assignments ===
- Unknown 1945 (Note: Probably IX Air Force Service Command until return to US, then Third Air Force)
- 4708th Defense Wing (later 4708th Air Defense Wing), 16 February 1953 - 18 August 1955

=== Stations ===
- AAF Station Fritzlar (Y-86), Germany, 1 Jun 1945 - c. July 1945<
- Flak Kaserne, Stuttgart, Germany ca. July 1945 - c. 20 September 1945
- Unknown, October 1945 - c. 9 November 1945
- Youngstown Municipal Airport, Ohio, 16 February 1953 - 18 August 1955

=== Components ===
- 86th Fighter-Interceptor Squadron, 16 February 1953 - 18 August 1955
- 502nd Air Base Squadron, 16 February 1953 – 18 August 1955
- 502nd Materiel Squadron, 16 February 1953 – 18 August 1955
- 502nd Medical Squadron (later 502nd USAF Infirmary), 16 February 1953 – 18 August 1955
- 744th Air Materiel Squadron, 1 Jun 1945 – c. 9 November 1945
- 920th Air Engineering Squadron, 1 Jun 1945 – c. 9 November 1945

=== Aircraft ===
- Republic F-84C Thuderjet, 1953
- North American F-86D Sabre, 1953–1955

=== Commanders ===
- Lt Col. Benjamin P. Rambo, 1 June 1945 – 1945
- Unknown, 1945 – c. 9 Nov 1945
- Unknown, 16 February 1953 – 18 August 1955

=== Awards and campaigns ===
Service Streamer	Service	Dates	Notes
	World War II Army of Occupation	9 May 1945-c. 20 September 1945	501st Air Service Group

== See also ==
- Aerospace Defense Command Fighter Squadrons
- List of F-86 Sabre units
