= 53rd Test and Evaluation Group =

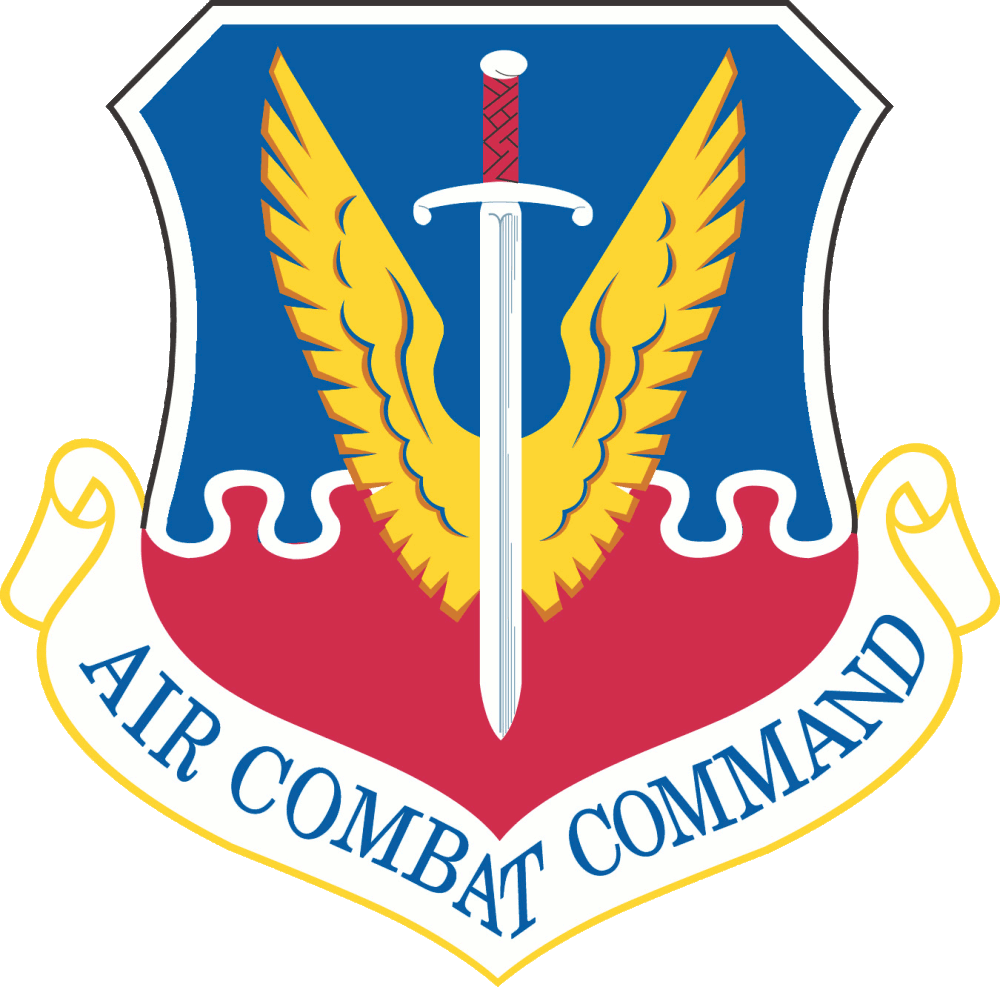
53rd Test and Evaluation Group

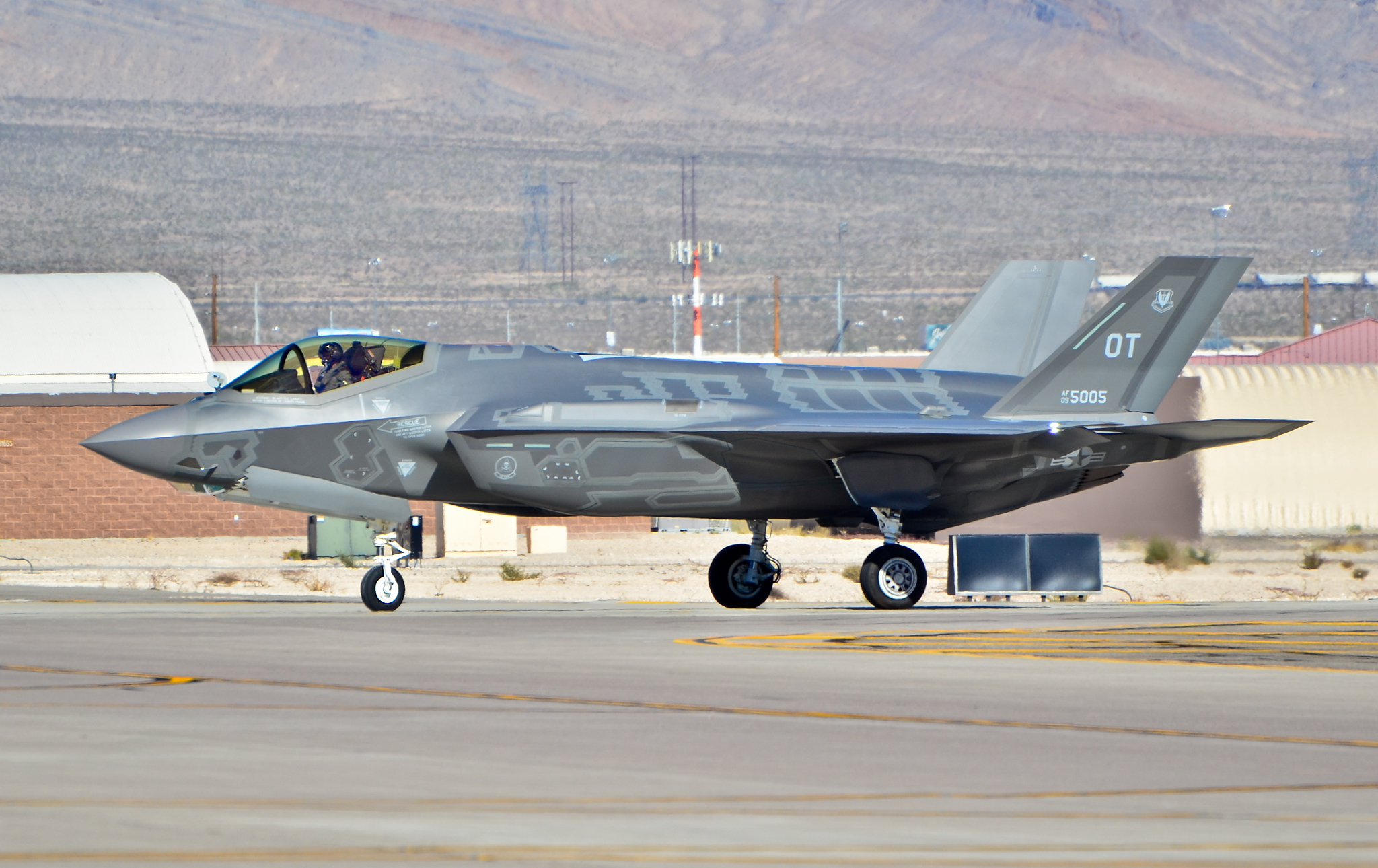
- 31 TES F-35A Lightning II (Note: Aircraft is Lockheed Martin F-35A Lightning II, serial 09-5005, taken at Nellis Air Force Base, Nevada.)
- Active: 1942–1947, 1955–1960, 1988–present
- Country: United States
- Branch: United States Air Force
- Role: Test and evaluation
- Part of: Air Combat Command
- Garrison/HQ: Nellis AFB
- Engagements: Mediterranean Theater of Operations World War II Army of Occupation
- Decorations: Distinguished Unit Citation; Air Force Outstanding Unit Award; Air Force Organizational Excellence Award

Insignia
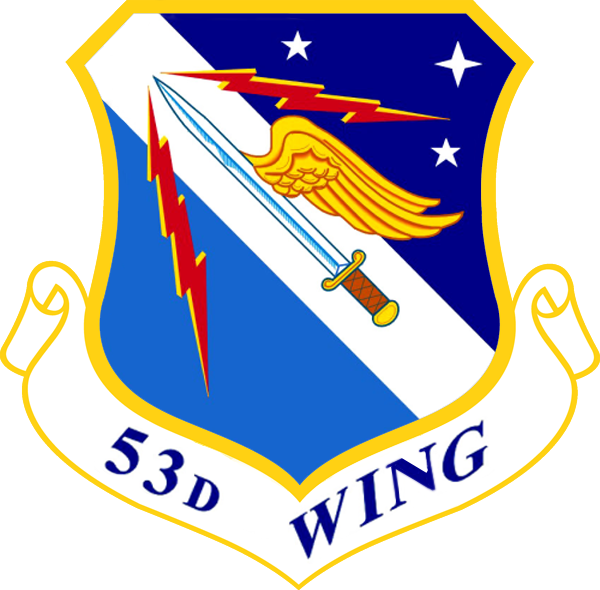
- 53rd Wing Emblem (Note: The group uses this emblem with the group designation on the scroll when assigned to the 53rd Wing Bailey, Factsheet 53 Test & Evaluation Group.)

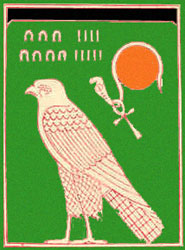
- 79th Fighter Group emblem (Note: Apparently, never officially approved. Maurer, Combat Units, p. 145. The blue stripe at top represent the sky, the hieroglyphic numbers display the group's number and the falcon headed Egyptian god, Horus is the central figure. Lind, Frontispiece.)

Aircraft flown
- Attack: A-10
- Bomber: B-1, B-2, B-52
- Fighter: F-15C & E, F-16, F-22
- Multirole helicopter: HH-60
- Reconnaissance: MQ-1, RQ-4, U-2

The 53rd Test and Evaluation Group is a group of the United States Air Force. It is a part of the 53rd Wing, and is headquartered at Nellis AFB, Nevada.

The Group was originally activated in 1942 as the 79th Pursuit Group (Interceptor), becoming the 79th Fighter Group (Single Engine) a few months later. Later that year it moved overseas to Egypt, where it was assigned to Ninth Air Force and participated in combat in the Mediterranean Theater of Operations in Egypt, Libya, Tunisia and Italy until April 1945. After the end of World War II, it became part of the Army of Occupation until it was inactivated in 1947.

The group was activated again in 1955 as the 79th Fighter Group (Air Defense) as part of a program of Air Defense Command (ADC) to replace its air defense groups with fighter units with distinguished records in World War II. It provided air defense of the Great Lakes region until it was inactivated in 1960.

In 1988, Tactical Air Command activated the 4443rd Test and Evaluation Group as an operational test unit at Eglin AFB, an Air Force Systems Command (AFSC) base that was home to AFSC's Armament Center. In December 1991, as the USAF eliminated its Major Command controlled (MAJCON) four-digit units, the 79th was consolidated with the 4443rd, and the combined unit was designated the 79th Test and Evaluation Group. In 1998, as a result of USAF policy that subordinate groups carry the same number as their parent wing, the 79th TEG was inactivated and replaced by the newly constituted 53rd Test and Evaluation Group. In 1999, the unit moved from Eglin AFB to Nellis AFB, Less than two years later, USAF consolidated the 79th and 53rd TEGs to provide one continuous history to its weapons test and evaluation group.

The unit consists of seven squadrons, two detachments, and a named flight. Its mission is to manage the flying activities of the 53rd wing at Barksdale, Beale, Creech, Dyess, Edwards, Eglin, Nellis, and Whiteman Air Force bases.

== Units ==
The group consists of seven squadrons, two direct detachments, and a named flight. These units perform tactical development, operational tests, and evaluations for Air Combat Command. In addition, the group assists the Air Force Operational Test and Evaluation Center with testing and operating the YAL-1 Airborne Laser, MQ-9, and F-35A.

=== Squadrons ===
- 31st Test and Evaluation Squadron
- 49th Test and Evaluation Squadron
- 72d Test and Evaluation Squadron
- 85th Test and Evaluation Squadron
- 88th Test and Evaluation Squadron
- 337th Test and Evaluation Squadron
- 417th Test and Evaluation Squadron
- 418th Test and Evaluation Squadron
- 422d Test and Evaluation Squadron
- 556th Test and Evaluation Squadron

=== Detachments ===
The group includes three detachments which are not part of the regular squadron structure:

- Detachment 1 – Based at Edwards AFB, Detachment 1 performs operational test.
- Detachment 2 – Based at Beale AFB, Detachment 2 performs evaluations of the Lockheed U-2 and RQ-4 Global Hawk and train personnel in the operation of the equipment.
- Detachment 3 – Based at Nellis AFB, Detachment 3 trains and evaluates aircrews in the use of Foreign Materiel Exploitations for the Air Force Materiel Command.

=== Named flights ===
The group includes one named flight:

- Combat Search and Rescue Combined Test Force – Based at Nellis AFB, the CSAR Combined Test Force currently operates the HH-60G Pave Hawk helicopter and Guardian Angel Weapons System in an attempt to consolidate all combat search and rescue operation efforts.

== History ==
=== World War II ===
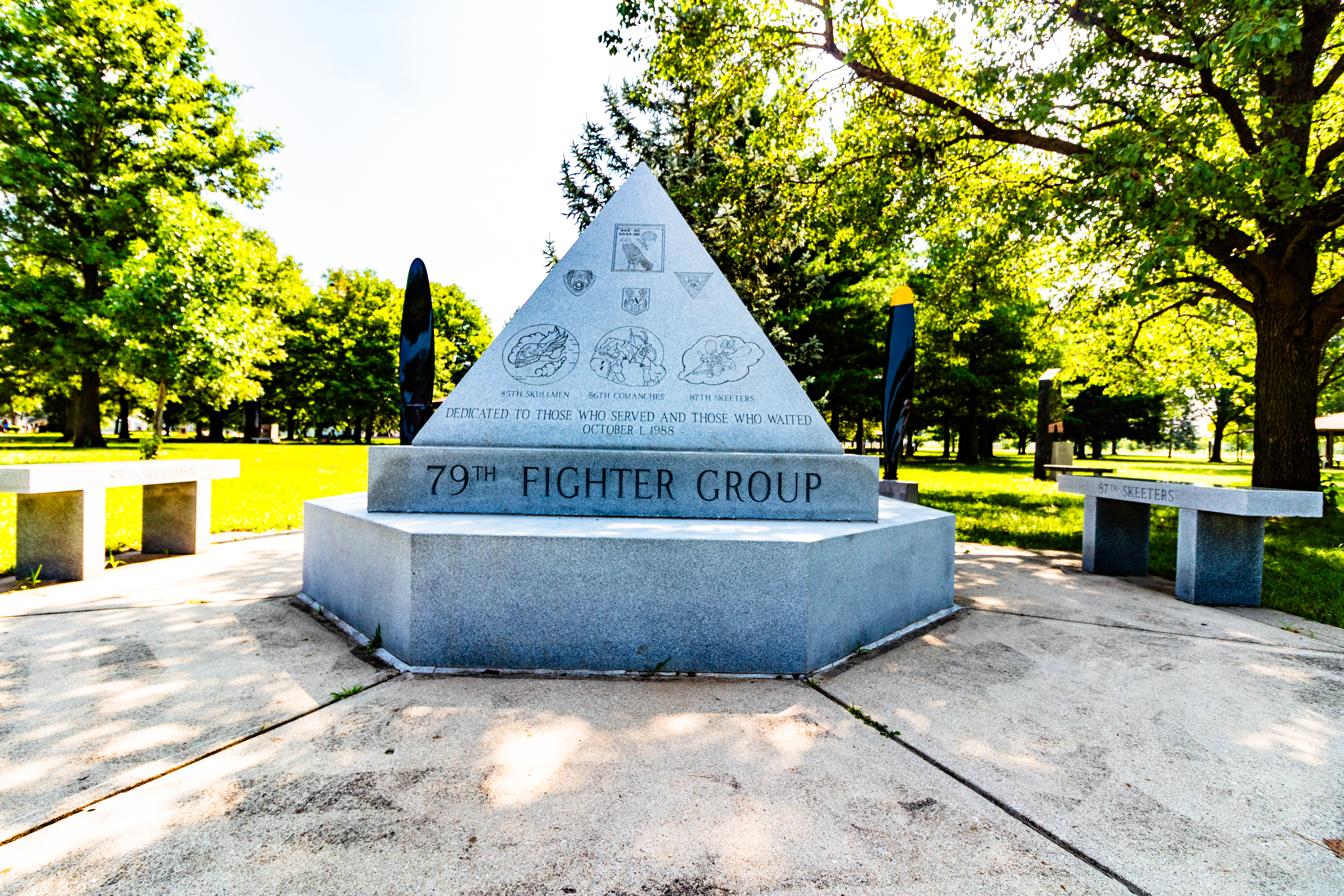
79th Fighter Group Monument at the National Museum of the United States Air Force

The group was constituted as 79th Pursuit Group (Interceptor) on 13 January 1942 and activated at Dale Mabry Field, Florida on 9 February 1942, drawing its personnel from the 56th and 81st Fighter Groups. its original squadrons were the 85th, 86th, and 87th Pursuit Squadrons. The group was redesignated the 79th Fighter Group (Single Engine) in May 1942. The group trained in the United States, then moved to Egypt by sea via Brazil in October–November 1942, where it became part of Ninth Air Force.

The group trained with P-40 Warhawks's while moving westward in the wake of the British drive across Egypt and Libya to Tunisia. Although many of the group's pilots flew combat missions with other organizations, the 79th group itself did not begin combat operations until March 1943. By escorting bombers, attacking enemy shipping, and supporting ground forces, the 79th took part in the Allied operations that defeated Axis forces in North Africa, captured Pantelleria, and conquered Sicily. The group was awarded a Distinguished Unit Citation (DUC) for its support of British Eighth Army during that period, March–August 1943.

The group was assigned to Twelfth Air Force in August 1943 and continued to support the British Eighth Army by attacking troop concentrations, gun positions, bridges, roads, and rail lines in southern Italy. It operated in the area of the Anzio beachhead, from January to March 1944. The group participated in the drive on Rome, from March to June 1944, and converted to P-47 Thunderbolts during that time. It flew escort and strafing missions in southern France during August and September 1944, and afterward returned to Italy and engaged in interdictory and close support operations in northern Italy. The group received a second DUC for numerous missions flown at minimum altitude in intense flak to help pierce the enemy line at the Santerno River in Italy in April 1945.

79th Ftr Gp

Aerial Victories	Number	Note
Group Hq	1
85th Fighter Squadron	28
86th Fighter Squadron	26	(Note: Newton & Senning gives figure as 25.99 due to one victory shared by three pilots credited as .33 to each.)
87th Fighter Squadron	41.5
Group Total	96.5

The group remained overseas as part of United States Air Forces in Europe after the war as part of the occupation force. It was transferred, without personnel and equipment, to the US in June 1947 and inactivated on 15 July 1947.

=== Air Defense Command ===
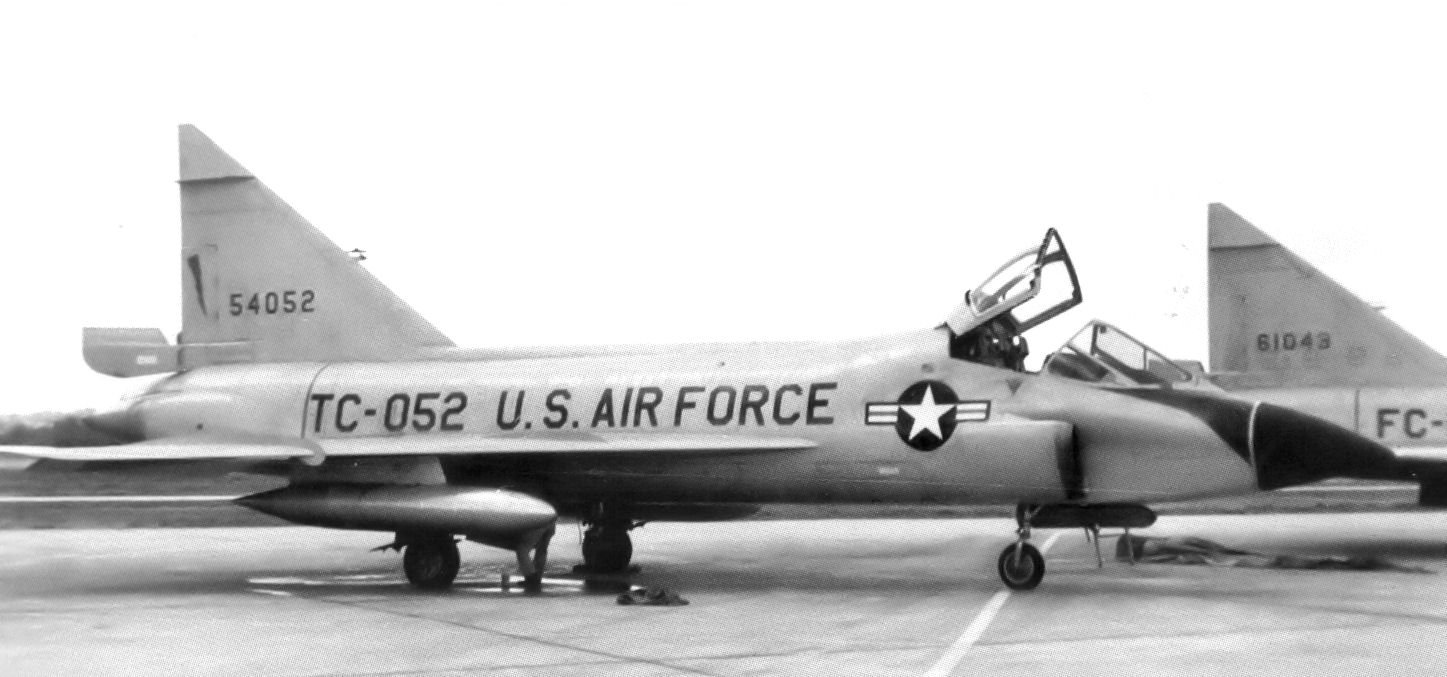
TF-102 of the 86th FIS at Youngstown MAP

The group was redesignated the 79th Fighter Group (Air Defense), assigned to ADC and activated on 18 August 1955 at Youngstown MAP, Ohio as part of ADC's Project Arrow, which was designed to bring back on the active list the fighter units which had compiled memorable records in the two world wars. At Youngstown, the group assumed the personnel and equipment of the 502nd Air Defense Group, which was simultaneously inactivated. The group provided air defense over eastern Ohio as part of 30th Air Division of ADC's Central Air Defense Force and acted as the host unit for the Air Force portion of Youngstown MAP. The 79th was assigned several support organizations to fulfill this responsibility. One of the group's original components, the 86th Fighter-Interceptor Squadron (FIS), flying radar equipped and rocket armed North American F-86D Sabres was already stationed at Youngstown and transferred from the 502nd.

In September 1957 the 86th FIS traded its Sabres for Convair F-102 Delta Dagger aircraft equipped with data link for interception control through the Semi-Automatic Ground Environment system. The Air Force transferred command of Youngstown MAP from ADC to Continental Air Command on 1 March 1960 and the 79th Fighter Group and its components inactivated that date.

== Lineage ==
79th Test and Evaluation Group

- Constituted as 79th Pursuit Group (Interceptor) on 13 January 1942

Activated on 9 February 1942
Redesignated 79th Fighter Group (Single Engine) in May 1942
Inactivated on 15 July 1947

- Redesignated as 79th Fighter Group (Air Defense) on 20 June 1955

Activated on 18 August 1955
Inactivated on 1 March 1960

- Redesignated 79th Tactical Fighter Group on 31 July 1985 (remained inactive)
- Redesignated 79th Test and Evaluation Group on 1 December 1991
- Consolidated with 4443rd Test and Evaluation Group on 15 December 1991

Inactivated on 20 November 1998

- Consolidated on 25 June 2000 with 53rd Test and Evaluation Group as 53rd Test and Evaluation Group

4443rd Test and Evaluation Group

- Designated as 4443rd Test and Evaluation Group and activated on 1 July 1988
- Consolidated with 79th Test and Evaluation Group on 15 December 1991 as 79th Test and Evaluation Group

53rd Test and Evaluation Group

- Constituted as 53rd Test and Evaluation Group and activated on 20 November 1998
- Consolidated on 25 June 2000 with 79th Test and Evaluation Group

== Assignments ==
- Third Air Force, 9 February 1942
- I Fighter Command, 22 June 1942
- Boston Fighter Wing, 1 August 1942 – 28 September 1942
- Ninth Air Force, 18 November 1942 (attached to No. 7 Wing, South African Air Force (SAAF) from 21 February 1943)
- IX Fighter Command, 24 February 1943 (remained attached to No. 7 Wing, SAAF until ca. 2 June 1943, attached to XII Air Support Command to 14 June 1943, No. 7 Wing SAAF)
- Twelfth Air Force, 21 August 1943 (attached to Northwest African Tactical Air Force (NWATAF))
- XII Air Support Command, 1 September 1943 (remained attached to NWATAF)
- 57th Bombardment Wing, 1 November 1943 – 1 January 1944 (remained attached to NWATAF until 17 January 1944, attached to 64th Fighter Wing 18 January 1944 – 10 February 1944 and 27 February 1944 – 20 April 1944, 87th Fighter Wing 11 June 1944 – 19 September 1944)
- XII Fighter Command, 20 September 1944 (attached to 64th Fighter Wing 20 September 1944 – 30 September 1944
- Twelfth Air Force, 1 October 1944 (attached to Desert Air Force 1 October 1944 – 9 May 1945, XXII Tactical Air Command, 12 May 1945 – 7 June 1945
- 70th Fighter Wing, 31 July 1945
- Tactical Air Command, 25 June 1947 – 15 July 1947
- 4708th Air Defense Wing, 18 August 1955
- 30th Air Division, 8 July 1956
- Detroit Air Defense Sector, 1 April 1959 – 1 March 1960
- USAF Tactical Air Warfare Center (later USAF Air Warfare Center, 53rd Wing), 1 July 1988 – 20 November 1998, 20 November 1998 – present

== Components ==
- 85th Pursuit Squadron (later 85th Fighter Squadron, 4485th Test and Evaluation Squadron, 85th Test and Evaluation Squadron): 9 February 1942 – 15 July 1947, 1 August 1988 – present
- 86th Pursuit Squadron (later 86th Fighter Squadron, 86th Fighter-Interceptor Squadron): 9 February 1942 – 15 July 1947; 18 August 1955 – 1 March 1960
- 87th Pursuit Squadron (later 87th Fighter Squadron): 9 February 1942 – 15 July 1947
- 99th Fighter Squadron: 16 October 1943 – 1 April 1944 (Attached)
- 316th Fighter Squadron: 15 March 1943 – 21 May 1943 (Attached)

Support Units

- 79th USAF Infirmary (later 79th USAF Dispensary), 18 August 1955 – 1 March 1960
- 79th Air Base Squadron, 18 August 1955 – 1 March 1960
- 79th Consolidated Aircraft Maintenance Squadron, ca. 8 July 1957 – 1 March 1960
- 79th Materiel Squadron, 18 August 1955 – 1 March 1960

Test Units

- 31st Test and Evaluation Squadron, 15 April 1993 – present

Edwards Air Force Base, California

- 49th Test Squadron (later 49th Test and Evaluation Squadron), 15 April 1993 – present

Barksdale Air Force Base, Louisiana

- 72nd Test and Evaluation Squadron, 20 November 1998 – present
- 337th Test and Evaluation Squadron, 14 May 2004 – 1 May 2021

Dyess Air Force Base, Texas

- 417th Test and Evaluation Squadron, 24 April 2018 – present

Edwards Air Force Base, California

- 422nd Test and Evaluation Squadron, 1 August 1997 – present

Nellis Air Force Base, Nevada

- 4486th Fighter Weapons Squadron, 1 October 1988 - 30 November 1991
- HH-60G Combined Test Force (later 88th Test and Evaluation Squadron), 1 October 2002 – present

== Stations ==
- Dale Mabry Field, Florida, 9 February 1942
- Morris Field, North Carolina c. 1 May 1942
- Hillsgrove Army Air Field, Rhode Island ca. 22 June 1942
- Bedford Army Air Field, Massachusetts 2 July – 28 September 1942
- Egypt 18 November 1942 (Note: Located at Alexandria by 1 January 1943 No byline. "Abstract, History 79 Fighter Group, Jan-Dec 1943". Air Force History Index.)
- Al Amirya (Landing Ground LG-174), Egypt 19 November 1942
- Gazala, Libya (Landing Ground LG-150), 14 January 1943
- Daraugh North Landing Ground Libya, 7 February 1943
- Castel Benito Airdrome, Libya, 27 March 1943
- Causeway Airdrome, Tunisia 13 March 1943
- Sidi El Hani Landing Ground, Tunisia, 17 April 1943
- El Haouaria Airfield, Tunisia, 2 June 1943
- Bou Grara Airfield, Tunisia, 6 June 1943
- Causeway Airdrome, Tunisia 14 June 1943
- Syracuse, Sicily, Italy 16 July 1943
- Cassibile Landing Ground, Sicily, Italy, 26 July 1943
- Palagonia Landing Ground, Sicily, Italy, 30 July 1943
- Isole Landing Ground, Sicily, Italy, 13 September 1943
- Pisticci Landing Ground, Italy, 24 September 1943
- Penny Post Landing Ground, Italy 26 September 1943
- Salsola Airfield (Foggia No. 3), Italy 4 October 1943
- Madna Airfield, Italy 19 November 1943
- Capodichino Airport, Naples, Italy, 15 January 1944 (Note: Part of the group remained behind at Madna.)
- Pomigliano Airfield, Italy 1 May 1944 – 17 June 1944
- Serragia Airfield, Corsica 20 June 1944
- St. Raphael/Frejus Airfield (Y-12), France c. 25 August 1944
- Valance Airfield (Y-23), France, 30 September 1944 (Note: The group history identifies this field as "Bron Airdrome".)
- Iesi Airfield, Italy c. 4 October 1944
- Fano Airfield, Italy c. 5 December 1944
- Cesenatico Airfield, Italy 20 March 1945
- AAF Station Hoersching (later Hoersching Air Base), Austria, 22 July 1945 – 25 June 1947
- Langley Field, Virginia, 25 June 1947 – 15 July 1947
- Youngstown Municipal Airport, Ohio, 18 August 1955 – 1 March 1960
- Eglin AFB, Florida, 1 July 1988
- Nellis AFB, Nevada, 17 June 1999 – present

== Awards and Campaigns ==
Award streamer	Award	Dates	Notes
	Distinguished Unit Citation	March 1943-17 August 1943	79th Fighter Group, North Africa and Sicily
	Distinguished Unit Citation	16 April 1945–20 April 1945	79th Fighter Group, Italy
	Air Force Outstanding Unit Award	1 April 1989-31 March 1991	4443rd Test & Evaluation Group (later 79th Test & Evaluation Group)
	Air Force Outstanding Unit Award	1 June 1994-31 May 1996	79th Test & Evaluation Group
	Air Force Outstanding Unit Award	1 June 1998-31 May 2000	79th Test & Evaluation Group (later 53rd Test & Evaluation Group)
	Air Force Organizational Excellence Award	1 January 1992-31 December 1993	79th Test and Evaluation Group

Campaign Streamer	Campaign	Dates	Notes
	Air Combat, EAME Theater		79th Fighter Group
	Egypt-Libya		79th Fighter Group
	Tunisia		79th Fighter Group
	Sicily		79th Fighter Group
	Naples-Foggia		79th Fighter Group
	Anzio		79th Fighter Group
	Rome-Arno		79th Fighter Group
	Southern France		79th Fighter Group
	Northern Apennines		79th Fighter Group
	Po Valley		79th Fighter Group
	World War II Army of Occupation	2 May 1945 – 25 June 1947	79th Fighter Group

== Aircraft ==
- Curtiss P-40 Warhawk, 1942
- Republic P-47 Thunderbolt, 1942–1945
- North American F-86D Sabre, 1955
- Convair F-102A Delta Dagger, 1955–1960
- Fairchild Republic A-10 Thunderbolt II
- Rockwell B-1 Lancer
- Boeing B-52 Stratofortress
- McDonnell Douglas F-15 Eagle C & E
- General Dynamics F-16 Fighting Falcon
- Lockheed Martin F-22 Raptor
- Sikorsky HH-60 Pave Hawk
- General Atomics MQ-1 Predator

Additionally, the group has flying hours assigned to the B-2 Spirit bomber, RQ-4 Global Hawk, and Lockheed U-2.

== See also ==
- 53rd Wing
- List of United States Air Force Groups
- United States Air Force
- Aerospace Defense Command Fighter Squadrons
