= Iesi Airfield =

Abandoned World War II airfield in Italy

Iesi Airfield
- Part of Twelfth Air Force

Site information
- Type: Military airfield
- Controlled by: United States Army Air Forces

Location
- Coordinates: 43°32′30″N 013°16′20″E

Site history
- Built: 1944
- In use: 1944

Location of Iesi Airfield, Italy

Iesi Airdrome was an abandoned World War II military airfield in central Italy, which was located near Jesi, in the province of Ancona in Marche.

It was an all-weather temporary field built by the United States Army Air Force XII Engineer Command using a graded earth compacted surface, with a prefabricated hessian (burlap) surfacing known as PHS. PHS was made of an asphalt-impregnated jute which was rolled out over the compacted surface over a square mesh track (SMT) grid of wire joined in 3-inch squares. Pierced Steel Planking was also used for parking areas, as well as for dispersal sites, when it was available. In addition, tents were used for billeting and also for support facilities; an access road was built to the existing road infrastructure; a dump for supplies, ammunition, and gasoline drums, along with a drinkable water and minimal electrical grid for communications and station lighting. The main runway was oriented in a NE / SW configuration 210' x 3060 of tarmacadam plus extension of 105 x 2800. The field was set up with a connection perimeter track 45' x 3300 and equipted with 50 double hardstands.

Once completed it was turned over for use by the Twelfth Air Force 79th Fighter Group from October though December 1944, flying combat operations with P-40 Warhawks.

When the 79th moved out the airfield was closed. Today, the location of the airfield is buried under a local industrial area
