= Frejus Airport =

Frejus Airport Advanced Landing Ground (ALG) Y-12
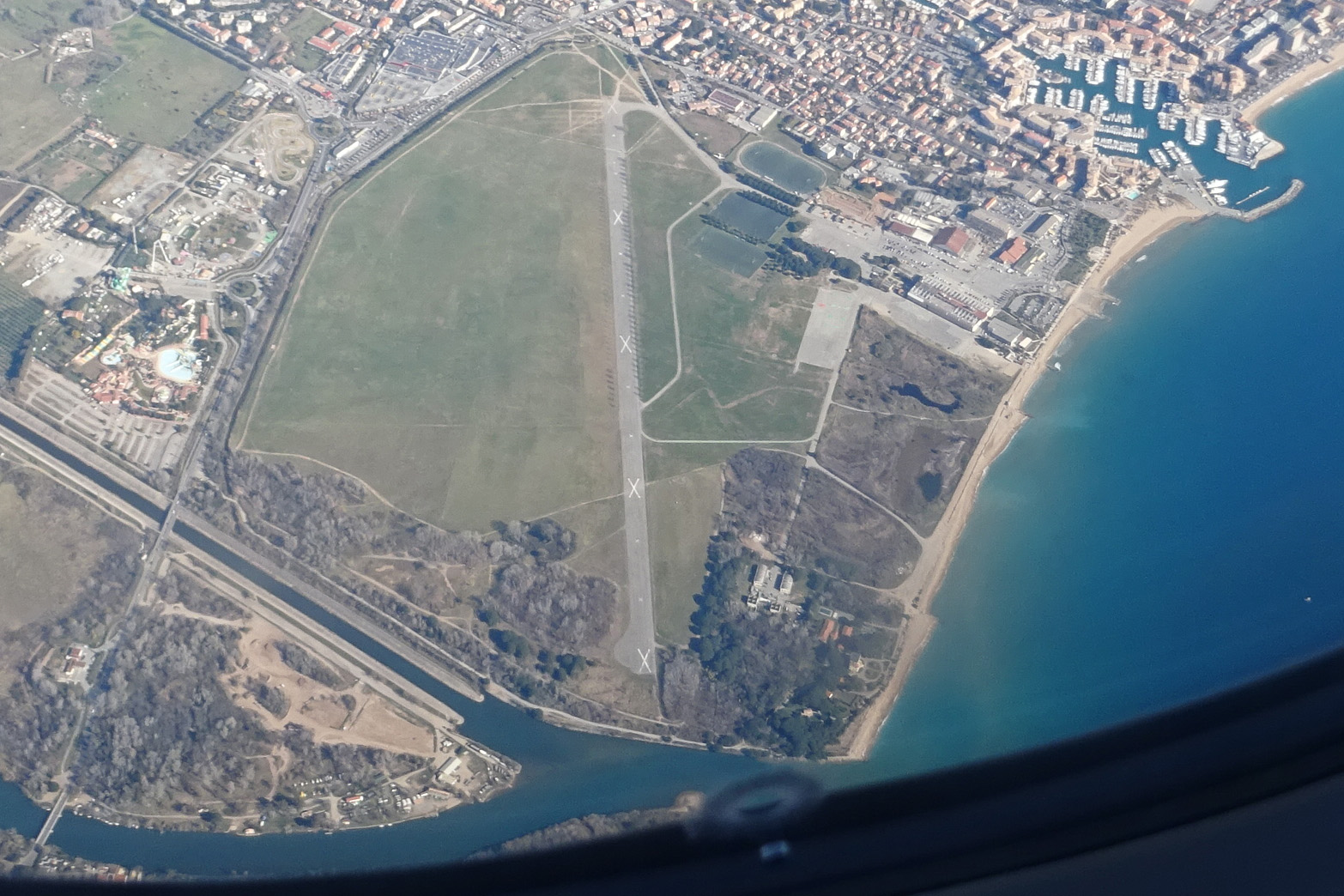
- Aerial view of Frejus Airport (closed at this time), March 2019
- IATA: FRJ; ICAO: LFTU

Summary
- Airport type: Closed
- Location: Frejus, France
- Elevation AMSL: 13 ft / 4 m
- Coordinates: 43°25′02″N 006°44′08″E

Map
- Location of Frejus Airport

Runways
| Direction | Length | | Surface |
| Direction | ft | m | Surface |
|---|---|---|---|
| 01/19 | 3,500 | 1,060 | asphalt |

Frejus Airport (IATA: FRJ) is a former airport in France, located in FREJUS (Departement du Var, Provence-Alpes-Côte d'Azur); 430 miles southeast of Paris.

The airport today is closed, but appears to be well-maintained. Now it is used as a sport complex and contains facilities for, among others football, rugby, running, and basketball.

== History ==
Frejus Airport was built before World War I as a grass naval airfield. The airfield opened on 28 March 1912 with the first official test flight of a Canard Voisin. It continued to be used for test flights. For the tests a new unit was established called the CEPA (Commission d'Etudes Pratiques d'Aéronautique or the Commission for the Practical Study of Aviation). The CEPA's mascotte was the head of a Sioux in the shape of a question mark. In its long history of naval aviation, the raid by Roland Garros on 23 September 1913 between Frejus and Bizerte is noteworthy.

During World War I the number of Navy (French: Aeronavale) aircraft grew from about thirty to over a thousand. After the armistice of the Great War, many flight test centers were closed, but Fréjus remained open.

Throughout the 1920s and 1930s Fréjus played a major role in testing new aircraft for the aéronavale. The first expansion of the center occurred in 1923, and by 1924 the airfield consisted of 9 hangars and a starting track for land-based aircraft. The CEPA participated in the first French aircraft carrier trials in the 1920s. Throughout the 1920s and 1930s multiple land-, sea-, and carrier aircraft types were tested. The second expansion was begun in 1931, growing to 156 hectares, the size it would remain until dissolution in 1995. The bases most memorable hangar (Caquot) was built in 1935

After the Battle of France in May and June 1940, Frejus was part of Italian-occupied France, and airport operations were suspended. However, the Italian Royal Air Force (Regia Aeronautica Italiana) did not use the airfield.

On 15 August 1944, United States Army parachute units, which included the 4th, 5th and 6th parachute battalions and 1st Indian Army Pathfinders, dropped into southern France between Frejus and Cannes as part of Operation Dragoon. Their objective was to capture the area, destroy all enemy positions, and hold the ground until the United States Seventh Army came ashore. Frejus Airport was seized from the Italian and German forces in the area and came under American control. Twelfth Air Force combat engineers arrived at the airport with the amphibious forces and laid out a 6000' sod runway, aligned east–west (08/26), making the airport operational for combat aircraft by 26 August. It was designated as Advanced Landing Ground "Y-12 St. Raphael/Frejus".

The 79th Fighter Group flew P-47 Thunderbolt combat operations from the airfield against the retreating German and Italian forces from Frejus until mid-October 1944. Once the combat unit moved out, Frejus became a transport airfield, supporting C-47 Skytrain resupply and also casualty evacuation flights, until being returned to French control on 20 November 1944.

After the war, an asphalt runway was laid down north–south and the airport operated under ICAO code LFTU until 1999. The runway and taxiway appear to be in very good condition, but are marked with large X's to indicate the closure of the air field. No evidence of wartime use remains.

== See also ==
- Advanced Landing Ground
