= Cervia Air Base =

Cervia Air Base

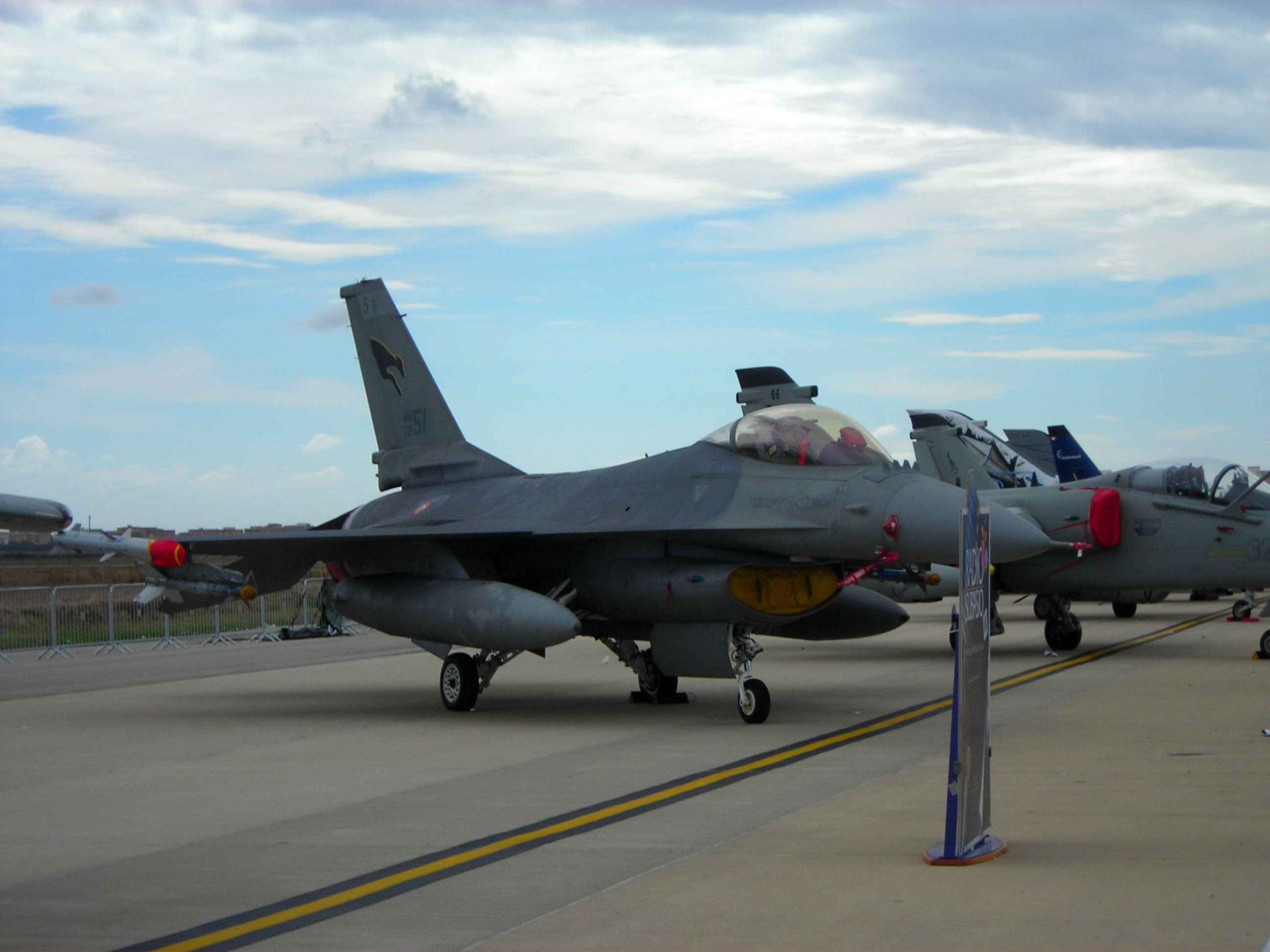
- F-16-ADF of the Italian Air Force
- IATA: none; ICAO: LIPC

Summary
- Airport type: Military
- Location: Cervia, Italy
- Elevation AMSL: 18 ft (5.5 m)
- Coordinates: 44°13′27″N 012°18′26″E

Map
- Location of airport in Italy

Runways
Direction	Length		Surface
Direction	m	ft	Surface
12/30	3,050	10,007	Asphalt
- Source: DAFIF

Cervia Air Base (ICAO: LIPC) is an air base of the Italian Air Force (Aeronautica Militare). It is located in northern Italy, approximately 6 km (3.2 NM) southwest of Cervia, in the province of Ravenna (Emilia-Romagna). It was the home of the 5th Fighter Wing, which flew leased US Air Force Lockheed Martin F-16 Falcon. It is also a NATO air base and is visited by other NATO air forces on a routine basis. After Italy returned the leased F-16 to the US Air Force the 5th Fighter Wing was disbanded and in its place the 1st Special Air Brigade moved to Cervia. Along with the 1st Special Air Brigade arrived the 15th CSAR Wing - the Italian air force's Combat Search and Rescue wing.

== History ==
During World War II the airfield was used by the United States Army Air Force Twelfth Air Force 79th Fighter Group, flying combat operations with P-47 Thunderbolts. The 79th used the airfield from 20 March until July 1945. The airfield was also used by the RAF's 112 Squadron late in World War II, from February 1945 to May 1945. The 15 Squadron SAAF also used this air field from December 1944 until May 1945.

== Facilities ==
The air base resides at an elevation of 5 m above mean sea level. It has one runway designated 12/30 with an asphalt surface measuring 3,050 by 45 metres (10,007 ft × 148 ft).

== See also ==
- List of airports in Italy
