= Serragia Airfield =

Abandoned military airfield in France

Serragia Airfield
- Part of Twelfth Air Force

Site information
- Type: Military airfield
- Controlled by: United States Army Air Forces

Location
- Location of Serragia Airfield, France
- Coordinates: 42°29′15″N 009°30′00″E

Site history
- Built: 1942
- In use: 1942-1944

Serragia Airfield is an abandoned military airfield in France, located approximately 26 km west-southwest of Porto-Vecchio on Corsica. Its last known use was by the United States Army Air Force Twelfth Air Force in 1944.

After the forced withdrawal of German forces from Corsica in September 1943, elements of the Twelfth Air Force 57th Bombardment Wing were moved to the island. Serragia Airdrome was taken over by the USAAF in July 1944 and used as a forward-base of operations for B-25 Mitchell bomber attacks against northern Italy and Southern France, in support of Operation Dragoon, the invasion of Southern France.

Known units assigned to the airfield were:

- 319th Bombardment Group, 21 September 1944 – 1 January 1945, B-25 Mitchell
- 27th Fighter Group, July–August 1944, P-40 Warhawk, P-47 Thunderbolt
- 79th Fighter Group, June, 1944 to August, 1944, P-47

The units remained on Corsica until early 1945 when enemy targets became out of range of the Mitchells. The airfield was closed by the Americans on 25 January and dismantled after the war, and today there are little or no remains of it other than the remnants of its main runway and disturbed areas where the airfield once was.
