= James Victor Gascoyne =

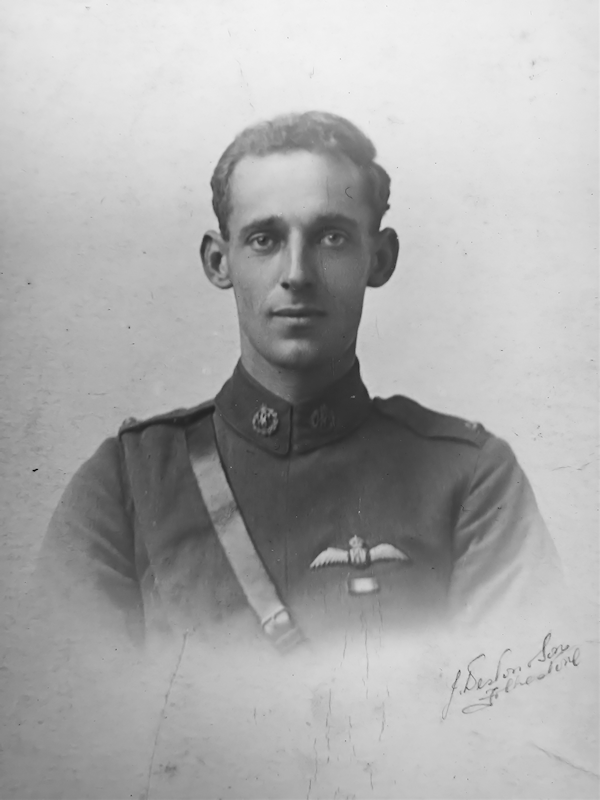
- Born: 25 May 1892; Royston, Hertfordshire, England
- Died: 1976 (aged 83–84); Taunton Deane, Somerset, England
- Military career
- Allegiance: United Kingdom
- Branch: British Army; Royal Air Force
- Service years: 1913–1921; 1940-c.1945
- Rank: Lieutenant
- Nickname: Gas
- Units: No. 3 Squadron RFC; No. 92 Squadron RAF
- Awards: Distinguished Flying Cross

Lieutenant James Victor Gascoyne DFC (25 May 1892 – 1976) was an English World War I flying ace credited with five aerial victories.

== Biography ==
Gascoyne was born in Royston, Hertfordshire, and joined the Royal Flying Corps in 1913, before the start of the First World War, as one of its earliest recruits.

In August 1914, he was assigned to No. 3 Squadron RFC in France as a member of the ground crew. After learning to fly in late 1917 at Lilbourne, Northamptonshire, he was granted a temporary commission as a second lieutenant on 19 July 1918, and joined No. 92 Squadron, based at Serny, in early August 1918. The squadron was commanded by Arthur Coningham, and equipped with S.E.5a fighters. In October and November 1918 Gascoyne accounted for five enemy aircraft, and was awarded the Distinguished Flying Cross.

On 1 August 1919 Gascoyne was granted a permanent commission in the Royal Air Force with the rank of lieutenant, but resigned from the RAF on 25 October 1921.

=== World War II ===
Gascoyne returned to military service during the Second World War, being granted a commission "for the duration of hostilities" in the Royal Air Force Volunteer Reserve as a pilot officer on probation on 4 September 1940. He was confirmed in his appointment and promoted to the war substantive rank of flying officer on 4 September 1941. On 1 January 1943 he was promoted to flight lieutenant, and on 1 January 1944 received a mention in despatches.

Gascoyne died in Taunton Deane, Somerset, in 1976.

== Citation for Distinguished Flying Cross ==
2nd Lieut. James Victor Gascoyne.
During the months of October and November this officer has accounted for five enemy machines, and during recent operations he has displayed splendid daring and great skill in attacking enemy troops, etc. On 9 November, although he was wounded in the head early in the attack and his machine was badly shot about, 2nd Lieut. Gascoyne made a most successful attack on the enemy from a height of 100 feet, obtaining three direct hits and inflicting heavy casualties.

== List of aerial victories ==
Confirmed victories are numbered and listed chronologically. Unconfirmed victories are denoted by "u/c" and may or may not be listed by date.

| No. | Date/time | Aircraft | Foe | Result | Location | Notes |
|---|---|---|---|---|---|---|
| 1 | | | | | | |
| 2 | | | | | | |
| 3 | 23 October 1918 @ 13:00 hours | SE.5a | DFW two-seater | Destroyed | South of Pont du Nord | Victory shared with James Robb, William Reed, Evander Shapard, Thomas Stanley Horry, and four other pilots |
| 4 | 27 October 1918 @ 07:35 hours | SE.5a | German two-seater | Destroyed | Two miles east of Le Quesnoy | Shared victory |
| 5 | 29 October 1918 @ 16:05 hours | SE.5a | DFW two-seater | Destroyed | Favril | Victory shared with Oren Rose, two other pilots |
