= William Reed (RAF officer) =

William Ernest Reed
- Born: 23 March 1896; Jarrow, South Tyneside, England
- Died: 15 December 1952; Kidderminster, Worcestershire
- Military career
- Allegiance: United Kingdom
- Branch: British Army; Royal Air Force
- Rank: Captain
- Units: Royal Engineers; No. 19 Squadron RFC; No. 92 Squadron RAF
- Awards: Distinguished Flying Cross; Mentioned in Despatches

Captain William Ernest Reed, DFC (23 March 1896 – 15 December 1952) was an English World War I flying ace credited with nine aerial victories. He continued in military service until 1938.

== Early life ==
William Ernest Reed was born at Jarrow, Tyneside, on 23 March 1896.

== World War I ==
Reed first served as a corporal in the Tyne Electrical Engineers, before being commissioned as a second lieutenant in the Durham Fortress Engineers on 25 June 1915. Both were Royal Engineers units of the Territorial Force, engaged in coastal defence works in the north-east.

On 5 September 1916 Reed was seconded for duty in the Royal Flying Corps, and was appointed a flying officer the same day. He was posted to No. 19 Squadron, and claimed his first aerial victory while on a bomber escort mission, on 14 April 1917. He scored again eight days later, but was wounded by ground fire in the process. On 10 May 1917 Flight magazine reported Reed as wounded in action. A week later, Flight noted that Reed had been mentioned in despatches.

On 1 July 1917 he was promoted to lieutenant, with precedence from 1 June 1916, in the Royal Engineers, while remaining seconded to the RFC.

On 1 April 1918 Reed was appointed a temporary captain "whilst so employed" to serve as a flight commander in the newly formed No. 92 Squadron. He scored seven aerial victories with them between August and October, but was wounded again on 3 November 1918. His exploits earned him the Distinguished Flying Cross, which would not be gazetted until 8 February 1919. His citation read:

Lieutenant (Acting-Captain) William Ernest Reed.

"A brilliant and skilful scout leader. On 29th October, although seriously handicapped by clouds, he led a successful patrol over the enemy lines. Attacking a large formation of enemy machines, his own formation accounted for five, he himself destroying one and driving down another out of control. In addition to these he has to his credit three other enemy aircraft."

== List of aerial victories ==
Combat record
No.	Date/time	Aircraft/ Serial No.	Opponent	Result	Location	Notes
1	14 April 1917 @ 1200 hours	Spad (A6753)	German reconnaissance aircraft	Driven down out of control	Douai	
2	22 April 1917 @ 0715 hours	Spad (B1563)	Albatros reconnaissance aircraft	Set afire; destroyed	South of Quiéry-la-Motte	Reed wounded in action by ground fire
3	25 August 1918 @ 1115 hours	SE.5a (D6959	Fokker D.VII	Destroyed	South of Armentières	
4	5 September 1918 @ 1100 hours	SE.5a (D6959)	Fokker D.VII	Destroyed	Southwest of Cambrai	
5	23 October 1918 @ 1300 hours	SE.5a (C1142)	DFW reconnaissance aircraft	Destroyed	South of Pont-du-Nord	Shared with James Robb, Evander Shapard, James Victor Gascoyne, Thomas Stanley Horry, and four other pilots
6	23 October 1918 @ 1330 hours	SE.5a (C1142)	DFW reconnaissance aircraft	Destroyed	Northeast of Englefontaine	
7	29 October 1918 @ 0930 hours	SE.5a (C1142)	Fokker D.VII	Driven down out of control	Northeast of Forêt de Mormal	
8	29 October 1918 @ 1030 hours	SE.5a (C1142)	Fokker D.VII	Destroyed	East of Le Quesnoy	
9	29 October 1918 @ 1030 hours	SE.5a (C1142)	Fokker D.VII	Driven down out of control	East of Le Quesnoy	

== Post-war career ==
On 25 March 1921 Reed relinquished his temporary commission in the Royal Air Force, upon his appointment into the Territorial Force; he retained the courtesy rank of captain. On 11 April was commissioned as a lieutenant in the 50th (Northumbrian) Divisional Engineers (Territorial Force).

Between 24 May and 8 July 1921 he served as a temporary lieutenant in the Defence Force, a unit "formed to help maintain law and order, and to render any necessary assistance in protecting those employed on carrying on the essential services of the country, without which the people of the country might starve", during the industrial unrest around the 1921 miner's strike. On 7 October 1921 he was promoted to captain in the 50th (Northumbrian) Divisional Engineers. He eventually resigned his commission on 15 October 1938.

== Bibliography ==
- Shores, Christopher F.; Franks, Norman & Guest, Russell F. (1990). Above the Trenches: a Complete Record of the Fighter Aces and Units of the British Empire Air Forces 1915–1920. London, UK: Grub Street. ISBN 978-0-948817-19-9.
