= Pietrasiak =

Pietrasiak is a Polish surname. It is a patronymic surname derived from the given name Pietras, a diminutive from the given name Pietr, 'Peter'. Archaic feminine forms: Pietrasiakowa (by husband), Pietrasiakówna (by father). Notable people with the surname include:

- Adolf Pietrasiak (1916–1943), Polish fighter pilot and officer
- Dariusz Pietrasiak (born 1980), Polish footballer
