= Earl Frederick Crabb =

- Born: March 27, 1899; Delhi, Ontario, Canada
- Died: October 18, 1986 (aged 87); Tamarac, Florida, USA
- Military career
- Allegiance: Canada; United Kingdom; United States
- Branch: Royal Flying Corps; U.S. Forest Service; U.S. Army Air Corps
- Rank: Lieutenant
- Unit: No. 92 Squadron RAF
- Awards: Distinguished Flying Cross
- Other work: Bush pilot between wars and after World War II; served in World War II

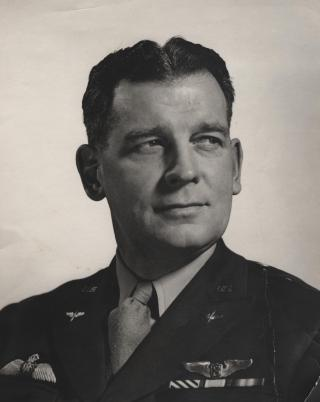
Earl Frederick Crabb

Lieutenant (later Major) Earl Frederick Crabb (March 27, 1899 – October 18, 1986) was a World War I flying ace credited with six aerial victories. After World War I, he was an aviation pioneer and bush pilot. He returned to military aviation during World War II. He flew as a commercial pilot until he was 72 years old.

== World War I ==
Crabb served in 92 Squadron under the command of fellow ace and future Air Marshal Arthur Coningham. Crabbe flew a Royal Aircraft Factory SE.5a to score all six of his victories. They took place between 22 July and 29 October 1918. Crabbe downed five German Fokker D.VII fighters and a DFW reconnaissance plane; the latter kill was shared with fellow ace Thomas Stanley Horry and another pilot.

Crabb was awarded a Distinguished Flying Cross on 8 February 1919.

== Between the wars ==
Crabb remained in aviation after war's end. He barnstormed. He flew air mail from Boston and New York to Detroit during the 1920s. In the early 1930s, he was the first pilot hired by the U.S. Forest Service in Maine.

== World War II and beyond ==
Crabb returned to duty for World War II as a major, joining the U.S. Army Air Corps and serving in Training Command. After his discharge in 1945, he returned to his civilian flying job. He retired as Chief Pilot with the Forest Service at age 65, circa 1964. He continued to fly as a commercial pilot until about 1971.
