= Brian Kingcome =

British flying ace (1917–1994)

Charles Brian Fabris Kingcome
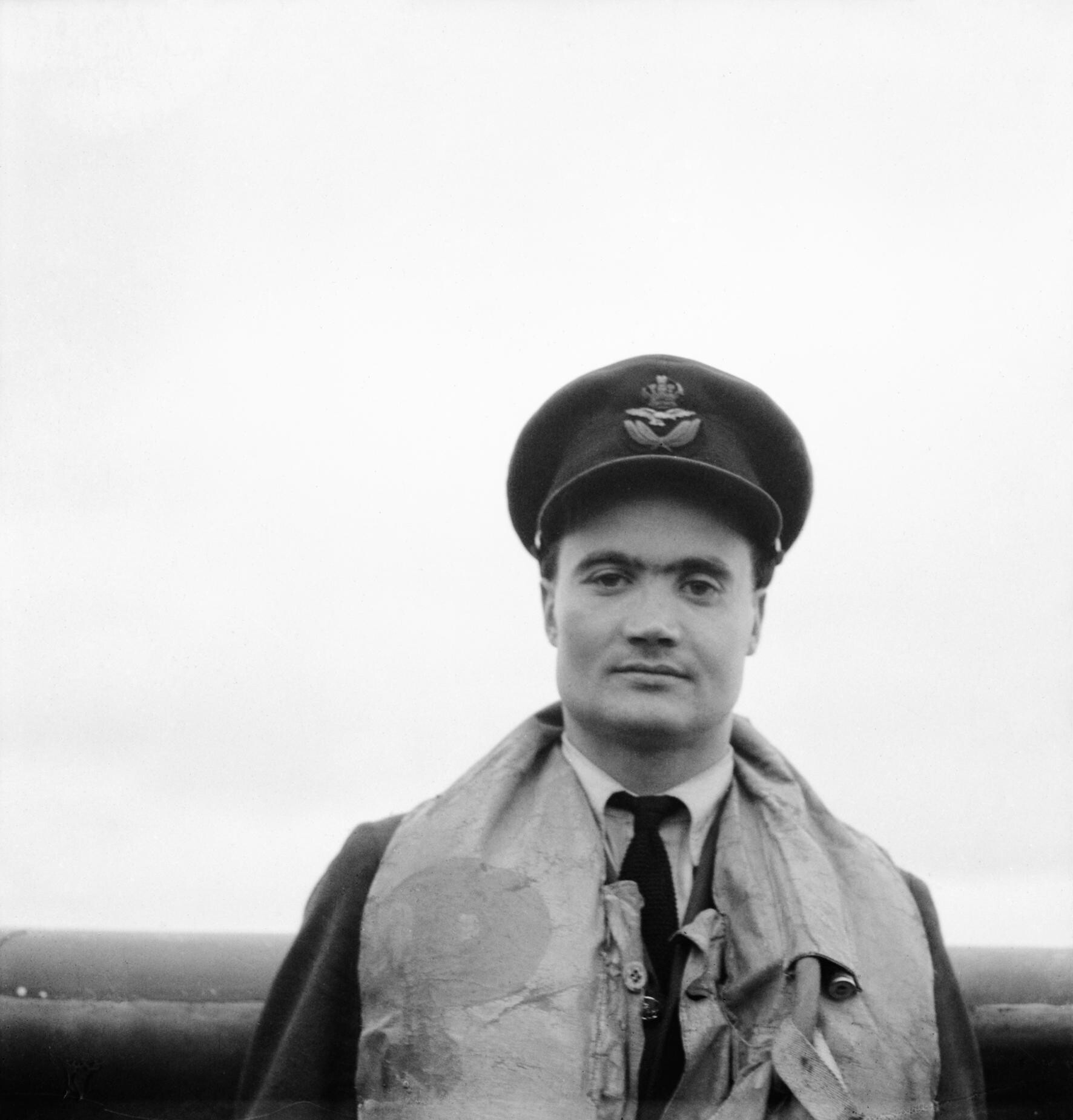
- Wing Commander Kingcome, Commanding Officer of No. 92 Squadron, at Biggin Hill, Kent, in June 1942
- Born: 31 May 1917; Calcutta, Bengal Presidency, British Raj (now Kolkata, West Bengal, India)
- Died: 14 February 1994 (aged 76)
- Military career
- Allegiance: United Kingdom
- Branch: Royal Air Force
- Service years: 1936–1954
- Rank: Group Captain
- Commands: No. 324 Wing RAF; No. 244 Wing RAF; No. 72 Squadron RAF; No. 92 Squadron RAF
- Conflicts: Second World War: Battle of France; Battle of Dunkirk; Battle of Britain; North African Campaign; Italian Campaign
- Awards: Distinguished Service Order; Distinguished Flying Cross & Bar; Mentioned in Despatches

Group Captain Charles Brian Fabris Kingcome, DSO, DFC & Bar (31 May 1917 – 14 February 1994) was a British flying ace of the Second World War, most notable for serving with No. 92 Squadron in 1940 during the Battle of Britain. He frequently led the squadron on a temporary basis before receiving full command early in 1941.

Kingcome later served in North Africa, Sicily, Italy and over Yugoslavia with the RAF, Royal Canadian Air Force and South African Air Force Supermarine Spitfire and heavy bomber units. His total personal score stood at eight enemy aircraft destroyed, three shared, five probable and 13 damaged. Kingcome was awarded the Distinguished Flying Cross (DFC) in 1940, a Bar to the DFC in 1941, and the Distinguished Service Order in 1942.

== Early life ==
Kingcome was born in Calcutta, India, on 31 May 1917 and educated at Bedford School.

== RAF career ==
Kingcome entered the Royal Air Force College Cranwell, Cranwell in 1936. At the outbreak of the Second World War, Kingcome was based at Hornchurch Airfield serving with No. 65 Squadron RAF. He took part in the battle of France and the battle of Dunkirk; scoring no victories. He was then posted to No. 92 Squadron, RAF Tangmere in May 1940, where he assumed temporary command over No. 92 Squadron after the loss of their commanding officer Squadron Leader Roger Bushell over the skies of Calais on 23 May 1940.

During his time at No. 92 Squadron, Kingcome became acquainted with Geoffrey Wellum, who flew as his wingman and later recorded his experiences in the book First Light.

Kingcome was acting CO of No. 92 Squadron between official COs; during a month-long period in September and October, No. 92 Squadron lost three COs. In early 1941, after Squadron Leader John A. Kent was transferred, Kingcome received full command. During this time he and his pilots achieved the highest success rate of any squadron in the Battle of Britain.

After serving with No. 92 Squadron, Kingcome was briefly posted as flight commander at No 61 Operational Training Unit in late 1941. In February 1942, he returned to operations as CO of No. 72 Squadron RAF. Almost immediately he was ordered to provide escort cover for the unsuccessful Fleet Air Arm Swordfish attack on the German capital ship Gneisenau, the cruiser ship Prinz Eugen and the capital ship Scharnhorst as they sailed through the Channel in an attempt to reach Kiel, Germany during operation Channel Dash.

Kingcome then became Wing Leader at Kenley in June 1942, and late in the year posted to the Fighter Leader's School at RAF Charmy Down. In May 1943 he was posted to North Africa to command No. 244 Wing RAF and in September he was promoted to Group Captain at the age of 25. With 244 Wing, Kingcome found himself leading five Spitfire squadrons: No. 92 Squadron RAF, No. 145 Squadron RAF, No. 601 Squadron RAF, No. 417 Squadron RCAF and No. 1 Squadron SAAF during the Italian Campaign.

In October, Kingcome attended the RAF Staff College at Haifa. On completion, Kingcome was appointed Senior Air Staff Officer in No. 205 Group, which comprised all of the RAF heavy bomber squadrons in the theatre. In spite of his staff position, Kingcome flew several missions as a waist-gunner in a B-24 Liberator over northern Yugoslavia. He remained in Italy after the war as CO of No. 324 Wing, again on fighters. In mid 1946 he returned to the UK and the Staff College for two years.

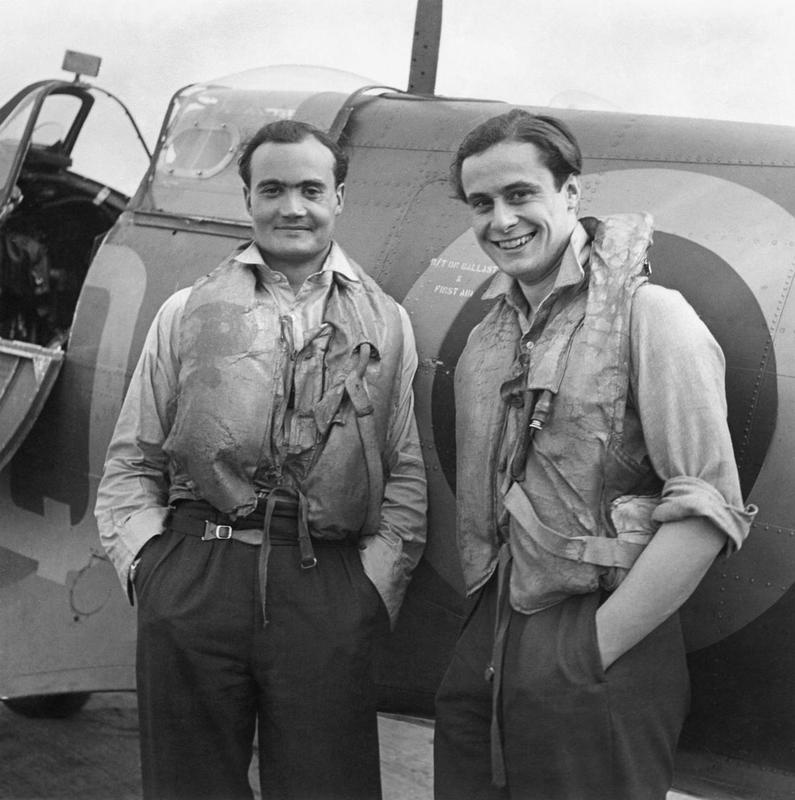
Flight Lieutenant Brian Kingcome (left), commanding officer of No. 92 Squadron Royal Air Force and his wingman, Flying Officer Geoffrey Wellum, next to a Supermarine Spitfire at RAF Biggin Hill, Kent, 1941.

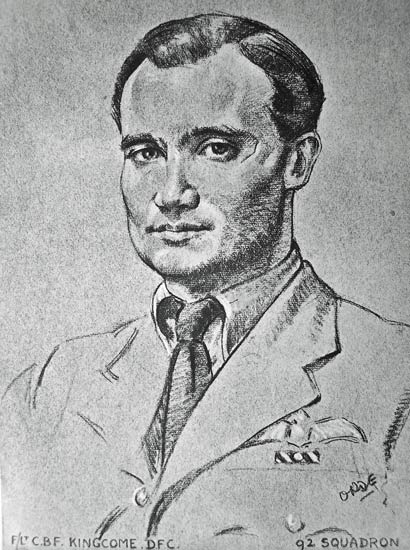
A portrait of Kingcome, drawn by the war artist Cuthbert Orde in 1941

== Victories ==
Kingcome flew Spitfires in combat continually until the end of 1944, his tally finishing at eight and three shared destroyed, plus a score of probables and damaged. One of the prewar Cranwell elite, Kingcome was to become one of the Second World War's great fighter leaders, alongside Douglas Bader, Robert Stanford Tuck and Johnnie Johnson.

In May 1940, Kingcome was posted to No. 92 Squadron as flight commander. On 25 May, Kingcome shared a Do 17 and on 2 June destroyed two He 111s and damaged a third. He shared a Ju 88 of 3./LG 1 with two others on 10 July, and again on the 24th. On 9 September he probably destroyed a Bf 110 and two days later shot down a He 111. On the 14th he damaged another. Kingcome shot down a Bf 109 on the 23rd he shot down Ofw. Gerhard Grzymalla of 8./JG 26. The next day he probably destroyed another Me 109 and one was claimed as damaged in Maidstone area around 08.45. Both claims confirmed by Intelligence Officer were unfortunately groundless. Jagdwaffe did not lost single one. Third claim was for damaged Ju 88. Three days later he shared a Ju 88 again, damaged two others, probably destroyed a Do 17, and damaged one of these also. Around this time Kingcome was awarded a DFC for six victories, and on 11 October got a Bf 109 he claimed another next day, and also damaged one. On the 13th he shot down a BF 109 of JG 3.

On 16 June 1941 Kingcome probably destroyed a Bf 109, and on 24 July shot one down. He received a Bar to his DFC, having brought his score to 10 confirmed kills. He was promoted to lead the Kenley wing, and on 15 April 1942 damaged a Fw 190. He probably destroyed a Bf 109 on 28 May, and during the year was awarded a DSO, having added another victory to his score.

In 1943 Kingcome was posted to North Africa to lead 244 Wing, and lead this for 18 months, becoming a group captain after the invasion of Italy. By the end of his stay with the wing, he had brought his total personal tally to eight destroyed, three shared, five probable and 13 damaged enemy aircraft.

== Later life ==
The Second World War had taken a toll on his health and, after being treated for tuberculosis, Kingcome was invalided from the service in 1954.

In civilian life, Kingcome engaged successfully in a London garage and car hire business with his Battle of Britain comrade Paddy Barthropp (who later became very successful with his Rolls-Royce chauffeur business). In 1969, with his wife Lesley (whom he had married in 1957) he set up 'Kingcome Sofas' an enterprise which involved the employment of Devon boat builders to craft sofas to each customer's measurements.

== Published works ==
Kingcome wrote an autobiography called "A Willingness to Die" about his experiences during the Second World War. His memoirs were written shortly before his death in 1994.

In it he stated "I always regarded 92 Squadron as my personal property. I led it through, what was to me, the most exhilarating and treacherous part of the war, the Battle of Britain at Biggin Hill. I gained and lost many good friends, and in front line operations I was with 92 longer than any other squadron" and "Why can't they just talk about Battle of Britain pilots? Why does it always have to be heroes? I think it devalues the word and denigrates all those others who were called on to face just as great odds."

== In media ==
Brian Kingcome appeared on screen in an uncredited speaking role of "Fighter Pilot" in the opening and closing scenes of the 1942 film "The First Of The Few" (US title "Spitfire") To mark the 70th anniversary of the Battle of Britain, the BBC commissioned a one-off drama for TV called First Light, based on Geoffrey Wellum's book of the same name, in which Brian Kingcome was portrayed by actor Ben Aldridge. The film was first shown by the BBC on 14 September 2010.

== See also ==
- Kingcome (disambiguation)

== Bibliography ==
- Kingcome, Brian; Ford, Peter (1999). A Willingness to Die. London: Tempus. ISBN 978-0-7524-1693-9.
- Price, Alfred. Spitfire Mark V Aces 1941–45. Osprey, London. 1997. ISBN 978-1-85532-635-4
- Simon Morris A Cobra in the Sky The history of 92 squadron.
