= RAF Desford =

Former RAF base in Leicestershire, England

RAF Desford RFC Peckleton
- Near Desford, Leicestershire in England
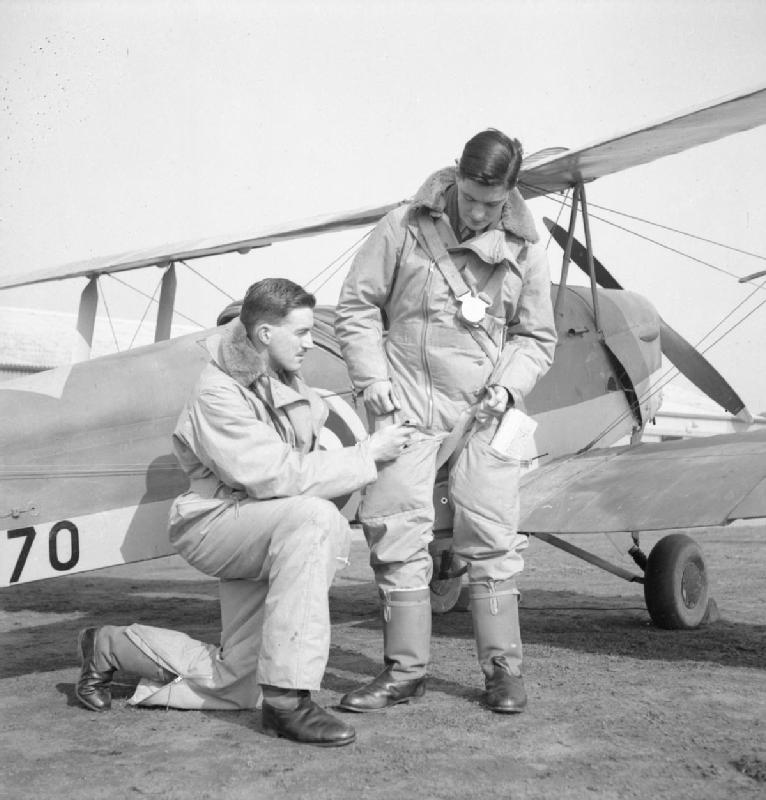
- Instructor and pupil in front of a de Havilland Tiger Moth at No. 7 EFTS, Desford. Both wear 1930 Pattern flying suits.

Site information
- Type: Royal Air Force station
- Owner: Air Ministry
- Operator: Royal Flying Corps; Royal Air Force

Location
- Shown within Leicestershire
- Coordinates: 52°36′40″N 001°17′28″W

Site history
- Built: 1916
- In use: 1916–1953
- Battles/wars: First World War; Second World War

Airfield information
- Elevation: 118 m (387 ft) AMSL
Runways
Direction	Length and surface
NE/SW	1,097 m (3,599 ft) Grass
E/W	823 m (2,700 ft) Grass

Royal Air Force Desford or more simply RAF Desford is a former Royal Air Force station located one mile (1.6 km) south of Desford, Leicestershire, and 6.7 miles (10.8 km) west of Leicester, Leicestershire, England.

== Early history ==
Flying at Desford began in 1916, during the First World War, when the Royal Flying Corps rented a field from a local farmer to be used as an emergency landing ground for No. 38 (Home Defence) Squadron RFC, who were based at Melton Mowbray. It was then designated RFC Peckleton.

After the war the site reverted to agricultural use, until the Leicestershire Aero Club rented 43 acres of land from farmer John Cart in late 1929. They built a clubhouse, a small hangar, and installed a fuel store and pump. The aerodrome was officially opened on 14 September 1929 by Under-Secretary of State for Air Frederick Montague, with an air display which attracted a crowd estimated at 30,000.

Desford was twice used as a turning point for the King's Cup Air Race, in 1931 and 1933, and Alan Cobham's air display team visited in 1933 and 1934. Leicestershire Aero Club eventually left Desford in March 1935, relocating to the new municipal airport at Braunstone Frith.

== Flying school ==
In August 1935 the original 42-acre site, and an additional 56 acres for future expansion, was bought by the aviation instrumentation company Reid and Sigrist, who had contracted to create one of the thirteen new Civilian Flying Schools as part of the Royal Air Force's expansion scheme. Desford was the ninth CFS when it was officially opened on 13 December 1935 by Viscount Swinton, the Secretary of State for Air. The new flying school was equipped with a large 220 ft (67 m) by 70 ft (21 m) hangar, and an administration block with offices, four large lecture rooms, a photographic department, and parachute and first-aid rooms. There was also a mess block, and residential bungalows for the trainees, all centrally heated and soundproofed. In the clubhouse there was a dining-room, lounge, meeting hall and kitchen. Outside an area was set aside for a sports ground, gardens, and a car park. Trainees were to be instructed in administration, law and discipline, airmanship, navigation, armament, photography and signalling. The school had seventeen de Havilland Tiger Moths (with Gipsy Major engines), all fitted with Reid and Sigrist blind flying instruments in both cockpits, for flying instruction.

In 1937 the RAF Volunteer Reserve was formed and Desford became home to No. 7 Elementary and Reserve Flying Training School. Also that year No. 3 Civil Air Navigation School, flying Avro Ansons, was based there, until eventually leaving at the end of 1939. A further 150 acres of land were also acquired in 1937, and new administration blocks, hangars, a gun range, and squash and tennis courts were built. In 1938 facilities at Desford were further improved with the addition of reserve quarters and new control buildings, and a separate air-conditioned building to house a Link Trainer.

== World War II ==
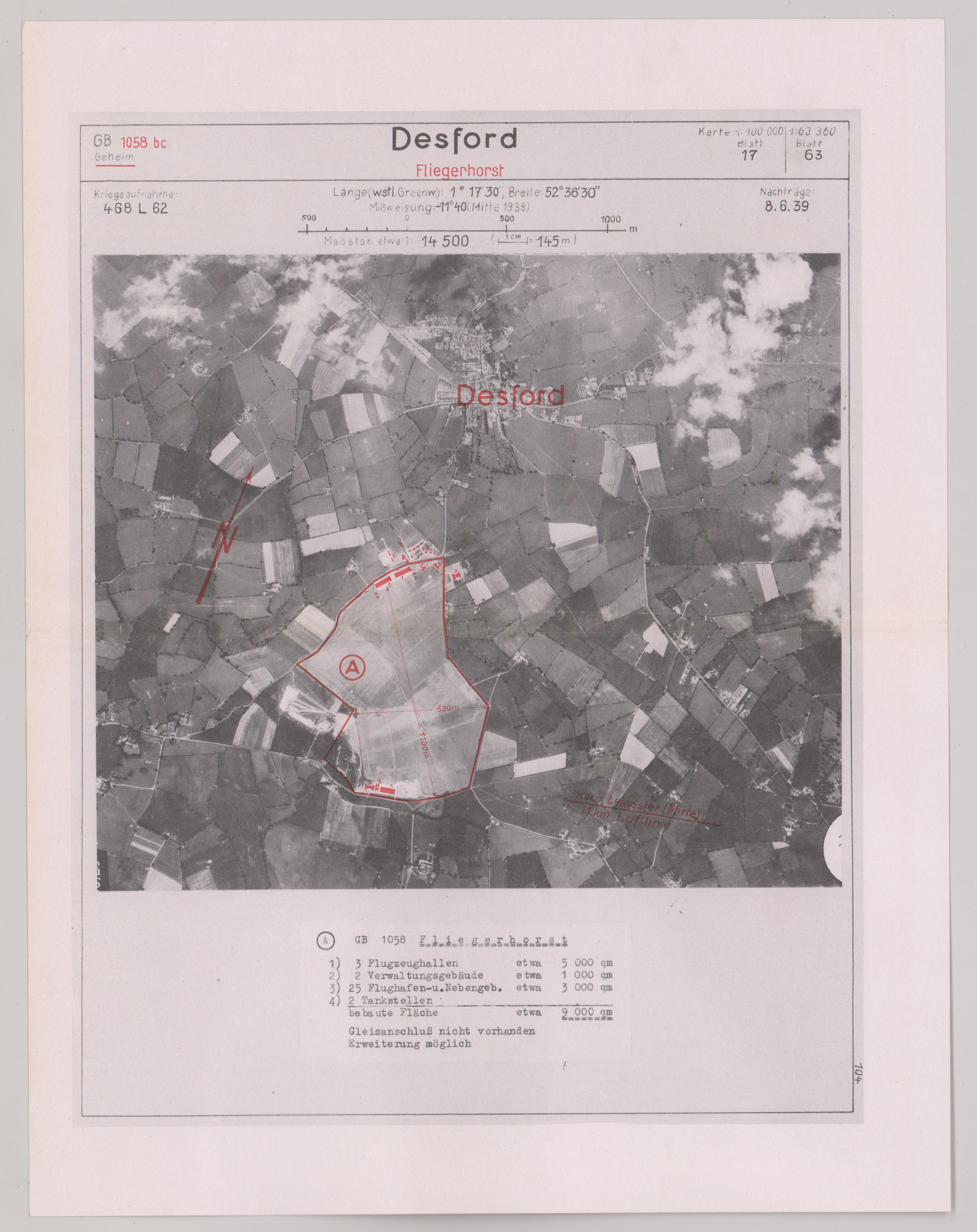
RAF Desford on a target dossier of the German Luftwaffe, 1939

On the outbreak of the Second World War on 3 September 1939, the school dropped the "Reserve" and became No. 7 Elementary Flying Training School. At its peak there were 120 Tiger Moths based at Desford, in four flights. In mid-1940 some of these were fitted with bomb racks, in case of a German invasion. In October 1940 the municipal airport at Braunstone was requisitioned by the military and became a satellite airfield of Desford, with some training taking place there.

Apart from the Tiger Moths several other aircraft made landings at Desford. On 23 March 1942 Avro Lancaster "W4367", from No. 106 Squadron made a forced landing at Desford while returning from an operation, suffering minor damage. On 5 September 1943 a Boulton Paul Defiant crashed at the airfield, and was so badly damaged that it was scrapped. In October 1943 a B-17 Flying Fortress from 547th Bombardment Squadron, based at RAF Grafton Underwood, became lost on returning from a raid on Germany. It landed at Desford, but overshot the runway and crashed into a hangar, injuring two of the crew. The aircraft was later dismantled on site.

From January 1940 Desford also housed units of the Civilian Repair Organisation, engaged in aircraft repairs and modifications, originally the Boulton Paul Defiant, and later the B-25 Mitchell. Vickers-Armstrongs also had a factory at Desford to manufacture undercarriages for Supermarine Spitfires, and also carried out the assembly of aircraft there, with about 1,000 Spitfires rolling out of the Desford factory.

== Post-war ==
The manufacturing facilities were closed soon after the end the war, and there was a reduction in training activity. By May 1947 there were only three RAF officers and fifteen other ranks based at Desford, now designated No. 7 Reserve Flying School. However later in the year, reservist training began to increase and the Tiger Moths were replaced by Percival Prentices and two Ansons. No. 44 Gliding School of the Air Training Corps were based there from 1948 to 1950, and an Air Observation Flight from No. 664 Squadron, equipped with Austers were based there for three years from 1949. In January 1952 No. 5 Basic Flying Training School was created at Desford to train National Service pilots, and equipped with de Havilland Chipmunks.

However, later in the year it was decided that the number of National Service men accepted for aircrew training was to be substantially reduced and seven Reserve Flying Schools were to be closed, of which Desford was one. Finally, on 31 July 1953, RAF Desford was officially closed, bringing 24 years of continuous flying operations to an end.

Soon afterwards the site was acquired by Caterpillar and was redeveloped as a manufacturing facility. On 10 June 1999, the company celebrated the production of 100,000 backhoe loaders there by having the Red Arrows give an air display over the site, accompanied by a solo display by a Spitfire of the RAF Memorial Flight.

== Units ==
Sources
Unit	Dates
No. 7 Elementary & Reserve Flying Training School	25 November 1935 – 3 September 1939
No. 3 Civilian Air Navigation School	August 1938 – 1 November 1939
No. 7 Elementary Flying Training School	3 September 1939 – 9 May 1947
No. 3 Air Observer & Navigation School	1 – 24 November 1939
No. 9 Maintenance Unit	For temporary dispersal, 1940
No. 7 Reserve Flying School	9 May 1947 – 31 July 1953
No. 44 Gliding School	April 1948 – 1950
No. 69 Reserve AOP Flight, No. 664 Squadron	1 September 1949 – 15 June 1953
No. 5 Basic Flying Training School	1 February 1952 – 30 June 1953

== Notable personnel ==
- Roger Livesey, actor and star of the classic 1943 film The Life and Death of Colonel Blimp was an aircraft factory worker at Desford Aerodrome during World War 2.
- Bernard Noble, author and First Secretary to the International Court of Justice, worked as an aeroplane mechanic at Desford during WW2.
- Geoffrey Wellum, Battle of Britain pilot and author of First Light, which was later dramatised on television, had his initial flying training there.

== See also ==
- List of former Royal Air Force stations
