= Polish 122nd Fighter Escadrille =

122nd Fighter Escadrille
- 122 Eskadra Myśliwska
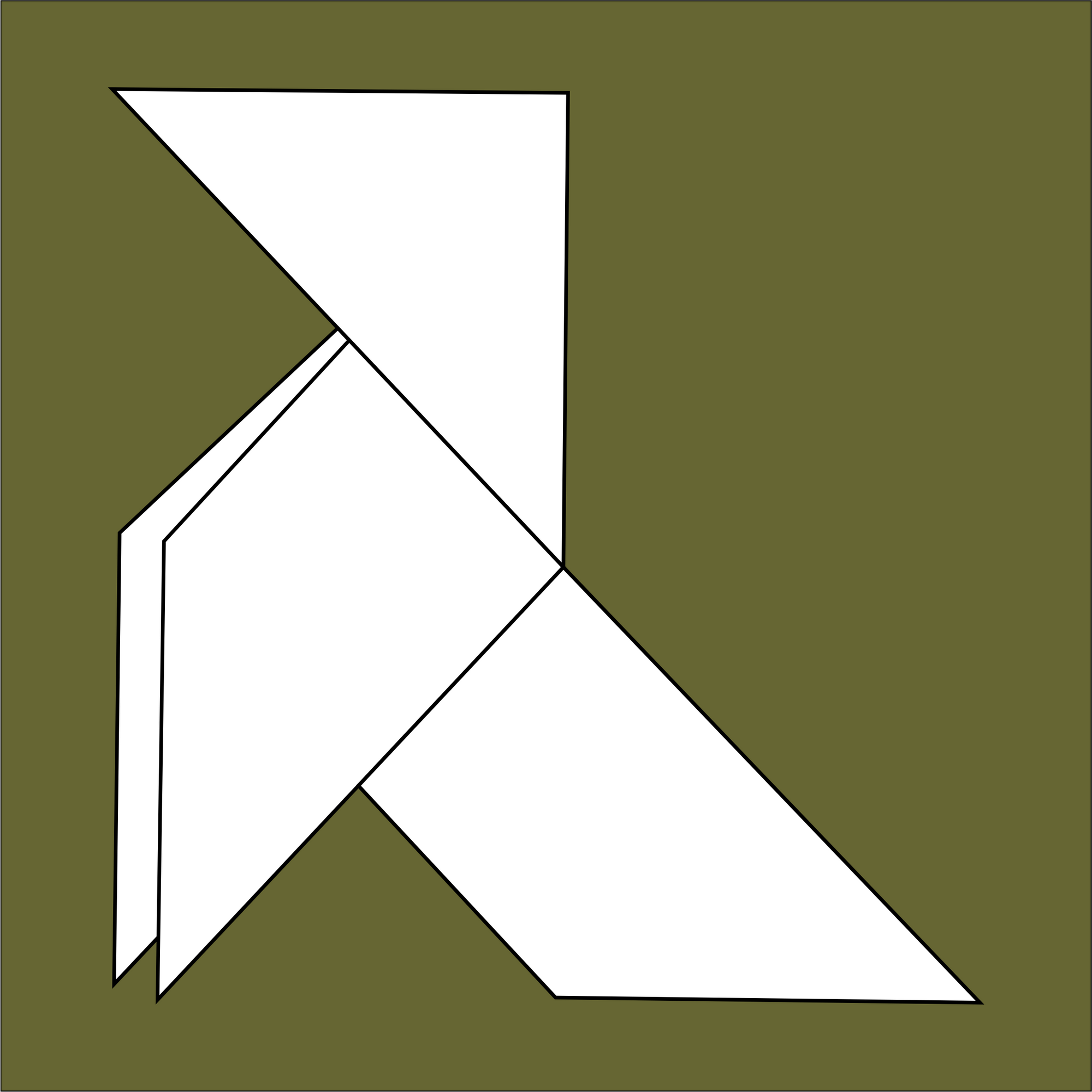
- Active: 1925 - 16 September 1939
- Disbanded: 16 September 1939
- Country: Poland
- Branch: Polish Air Force
- Role: Fighter Squadron
- Size: 13 Pilots
- Part of: 2nd Fighter Squadron
- Engagements: World War II: Invasion of Poland

Commanders
- Notable commanders: Kpt pil. Mieczysław Wiórkiewicz

Aircraft flown
- Fighter: Fokker D.VII; SPAD 61; Avia BH-33; PZL P.7; PZL P.11

The 122nd Fighter Escadrille of the Polish Air Force (Polish: 122. Eskadra Myśliwska) was one of the fighter units of the Polish Army in 1939.

== History ==
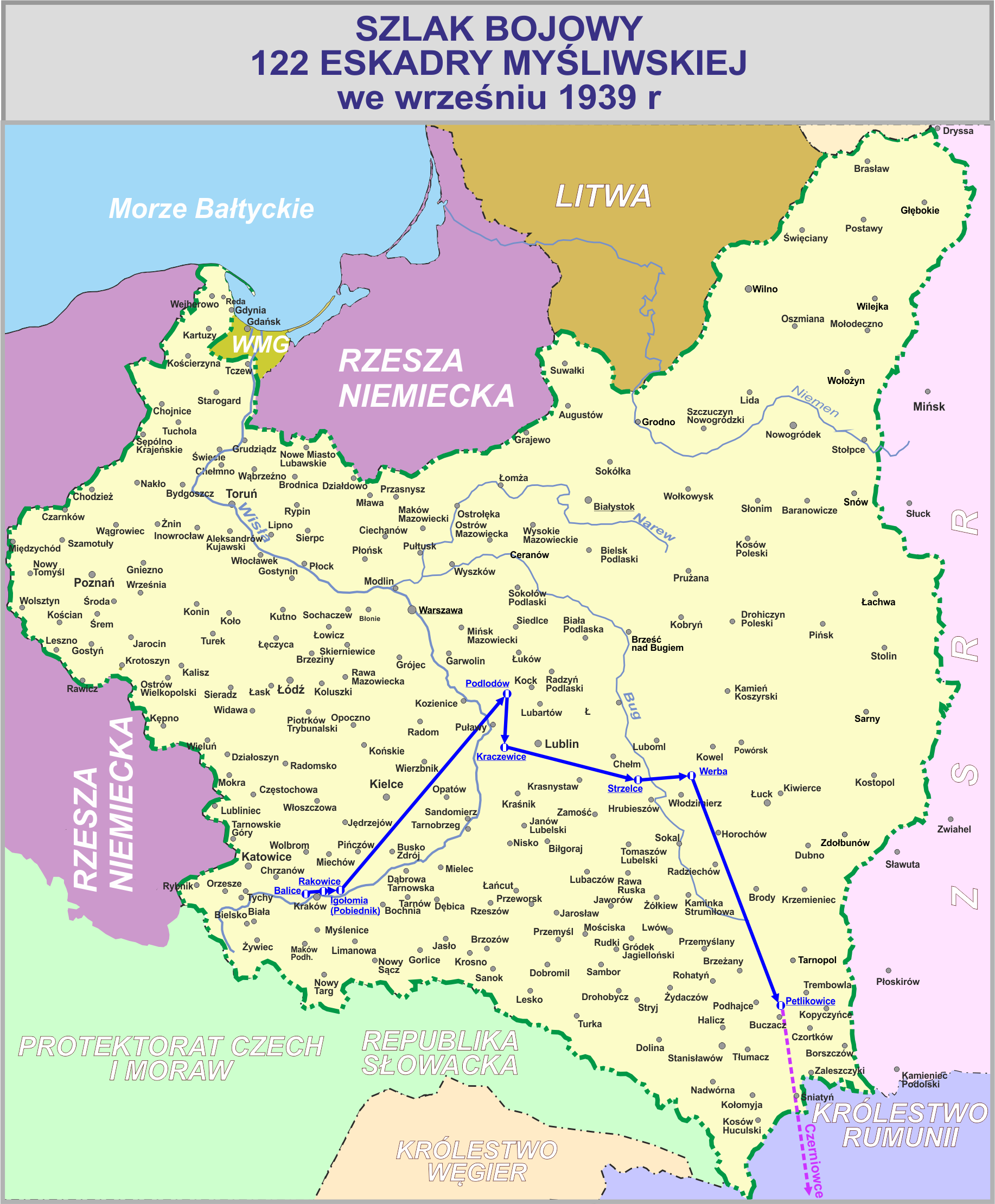

In September 1939 the 122nd Fighter Escadrille was attached to the Army Krakow.

== Crew and equipment ==
PZL 11c

On 1 September 1939 the escadrille had 10 PZL P.11c airplanes.

The air crew consisted of: commanding officer kpt. pil. Mieczysław Wiórkiewicz his deputy ppor. pil. Edward Pilch

and 13 other pilots:

1. ppor. Michał Samoliński
2. ppor. Bronisław Skibiński
3. ppor. Stanisław Wielgus
4. pchor. Władysław Grudziński
5. pchor. Franciszek Kozłowski
6. pchor. Bolesław Własnowolski
7. plut. Władysław Majchrzyk
8. plut. Antoni Markiewicz
9. kpr. Mieczysław Parafiński
10. kpr. Adolf Pietrasiak
11. st. szer. Paweł Kowala
12. st. szer. Tadeusz Krieger
13. st. szer. Edward Uchto

== See also ==
- Polish Air Force order of battle in 1939
