= Enguinegatte =

Enguinegatte Ingwinegate
- Part of Enquin-lez-Guinegatte
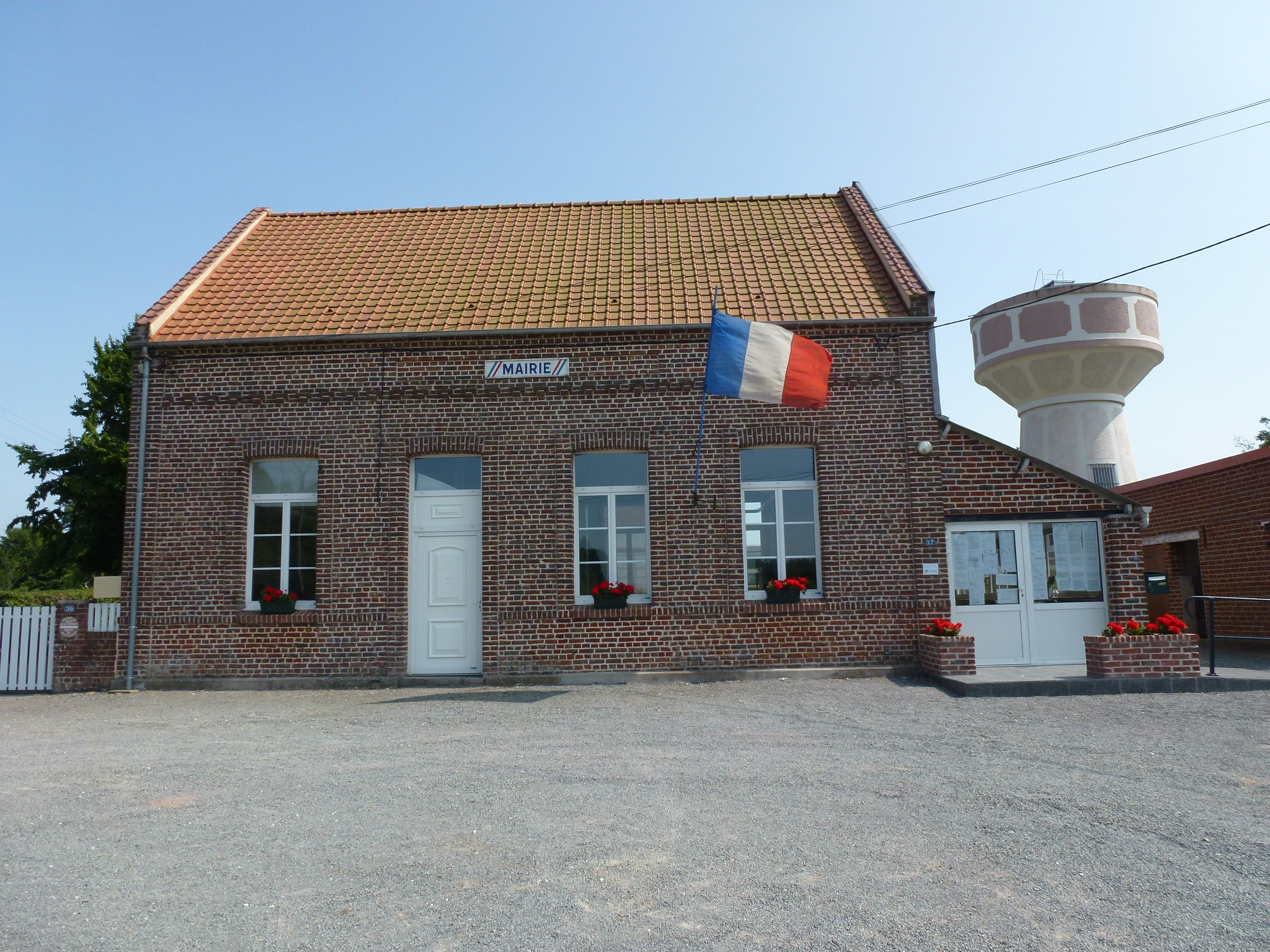

- Coat of arms
- Location of Enguinegatte
- Location within France Location within Hauts-de-France
- Coordinates: 50°36′32″N 2°16′19″E
- Country: France
- Region: Hauts-de-France
- Department: Pas-de-Calais
- Arrondissement: Saint-Omer
- Canton: Fruges
- Commune: Enquin-lez-Guinegatte
- Area^{1}: 8.92 km^{2} (3.44 sq mi)
- Elevation: 92 m (302 ft)
- Highest elevation: 132 m (433 ft)
- Lowest elevation: 51 m (167 ft)
- Population (2023): 450
  - Density: 50/km^{2} (130/sq mi)
- Time zone: UTC+01:00 (CET)
  - Summer (DST): UTC+02:00 (CEST)
- Postal code: 62145
- ^{1} French Land Register data, which excludes lakes, ponds, glaciers > 1 km^{2} (0.386 sq mi or 247 acres) and river estuaries.

Enguinegatte (French pronunciation: [ɑ̃ɡinɡat]; West Flemish: Ingwinegate; Picard: Inguin’gatte or Guin’gatte) is a town and former commune in the Pas-de-Calais department in the Hauts-de-France region of France.

The commune merged with Enquin-les-Mines on 1 January 2017 to form the new commune of Enquin-lez-Guinegatte. Its population was 450 in 2023. It is 10 miles (16 km) southwest of Saint-Omer.

== See also ==
- Communes of the Pas-de-Calais department
