= No. 664 Squadron AAC =

Flying squadron of the British Army's Army Air Corps

664 Squadron AAC No. 664 Parachute Squadron AAC No. 664 Squadron RAuxAF No. 664 Squadron RAF
- Active: 9 Dec 1944–31 May 1946 (RCAF); 1 Sept 1949 – 10 Mar 1957 (RAuxAF); 1969 - March 1978; April 1978 - present
- Country: United Kingdom
- Branch: British Army
- Type: Attack Aviation
- Role: Attack/ISTAR
- Part of: 4 Regiment Army Air Corps
- Garrison/HQ: Wattisham Flying Station
- Nickname: "The Archers"
- Mottos: 'Vae Viso' or 'I espied it; woe betide it'

Aircraft flown
- Attack helicopter: Boeing AH-64E Apache

664 Squadron AAC is a squadron of the British Army's Army Air Corps. It was formerly No. 664 Squadron, a Royal Air Force air observation post squadron associated with the Canadian 1st Army during the Second World War and later part of the Royal Auxiliary Air Force. Numbers 651 to 663 Squadrons of the RAF were air observation post units working closely with British Army units in artillery spotting and liaison. A further three of these squadrons, 664–666, were manned with Canadian personnel. Their duties and squadron numbers were transferred to the Army with the formation of the Army Air Corps on 1 September 1957.

== History ==
=== Royal Canadian Air Force ===
No. 664 Squadron was formed on 9 December 1944 at RAF Andover as an air observation post (AOP) squadron associated with the Canadian 1st Army. The pilots were officers recruited from the Royal Canadian Artillery and trained to fly at No. 22 Elementary Flying Training School RAF, RAF Cambridge, further developing advanced flying skills at No. 43 Operational Training Unit RAF (43 OTU), RAF Andover. The first commanding officer was Major Dave Ely, RCA; the operational commanding officer was Major D.W. Blyth, RCA. The original members of the modified 664 Squadron were: Maj D. Blyth, Capt Mike Henderson, Capt Ron Ingle, Capt John Duncom, Capt Brownie Culver, Capt Reg Fuller, Capt Doug Russell and Mr Larry Debank (Sally Ann). In England the squadron operated under the overall control of No. 70 Group, RAF Fighter Command; prior to deployment to the European continent, the squadron was transferred to No. 84 Group, Second Tactical Air Force (2 TAF).

In January 1945, the squadron was deployed to RAF Penshurst, deploying to the Netherlands in March 1945. The squadron flew its first operational sortie over the enemy front in the Netherlands on 22 March 1945. The principal aircraft flown in action was the Taylorcraft Auster Mk. IV and V. After V-E Day on 8 May 1945, the squadron was tasked with flying mail and passengers for First Canadian Army. The squadron continued flying like duties for the Canadian Army Occupation Force (CAOF) until the spring of 1946. 664 (AOP) Squadron RCAF, was disbanded on 31 May 1946 at Rostrup, Denmark.

Although the squadron's trained aircrew observers performed yeoman service in aerial action against the enemy, aircrew associations across Canada did not grant membership to AOP observers, as those aircrew were not officially issued with cloth wings during the war

The squadron's motto was :Latin - Vae Viso ("I espied it; woe betide it"), its identification symbol was: An archer kneeling in a sinister position, his bow fully drawn, its identification symbol was AW (Dec 1944 – May 1946) and ROD (Sep 1949 – Apr 1951).

=== Post-war RAuxAF ===
As the number was not transferred to the Canadian authorities, it was revived post-war when the squadron was reformed as part of the RAuxAF on 1 September 1949 at RAF Hucknall. Equipped with Auster aircraft, the squadron was based at:

- RAF Hucknall (1970 (Reserve) AOP Flight)
- RAF Ouston (later at RAF Usworth 1965 (Reserve) AOP Flight)
- RAF Desford (later at RAF Wymeswold 1969 (Reserve) AOP Flight)
- Yeadon Aerodrome (also at RAF Rufforth 1964 (Reserve) AOP Flight)

The squadron was disbanded, like all other units of the Royal Auxiliary Air Force, on 10 March 1957.

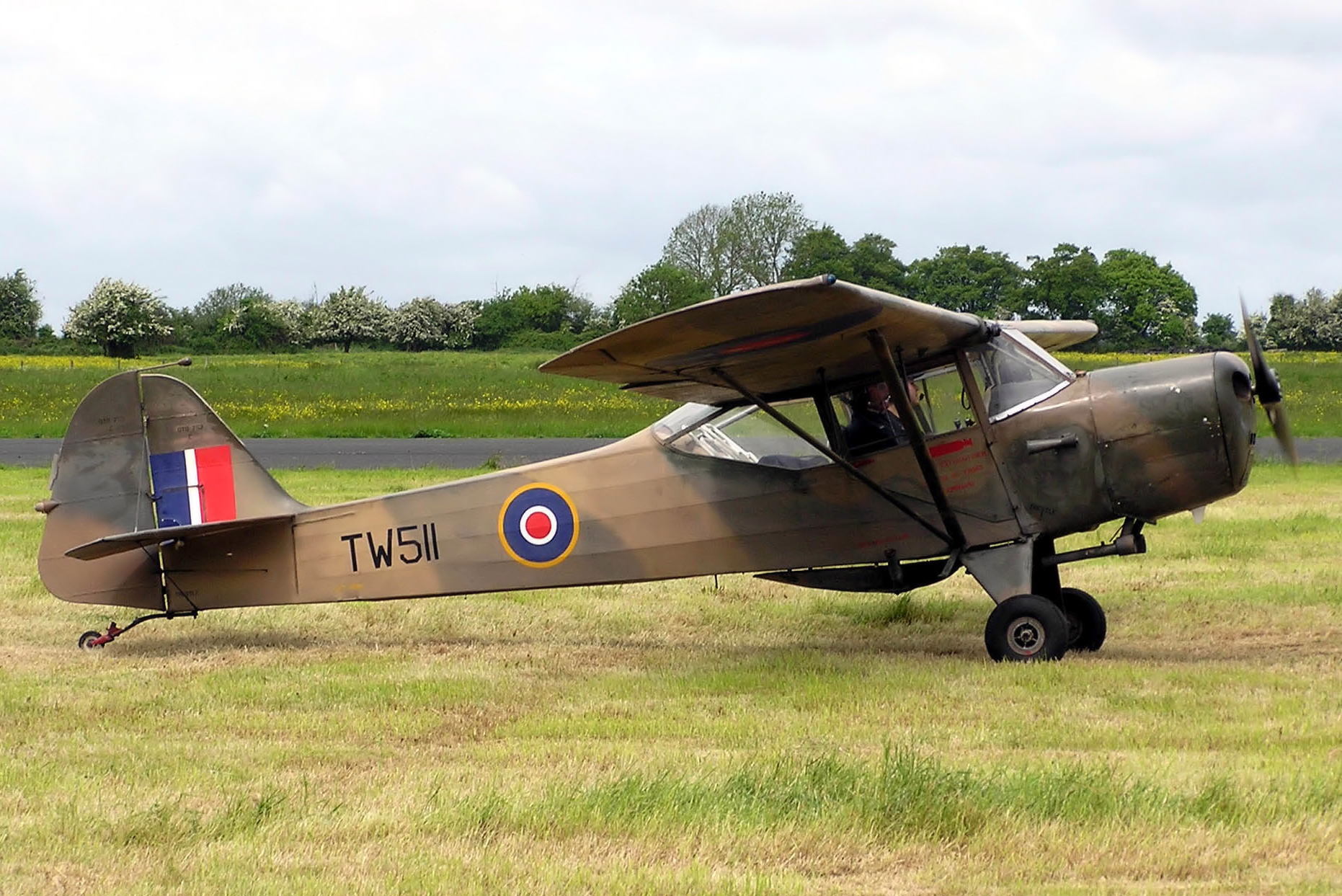
A postwar Auster Mk.V, restored in wartime colours.

Aircraft operated by No. 664 Squadron RCAF/RAF
From	To	Aircraft	Variant
December 1944	May 1946	Taylorcraft Auster	IV
December 1944	May 1946	Auster	V
September 1949	October 1951	Auster	V
September 1949	February 1957	Auster	AOP.6

The squadron was reformed in Minden as 664 Squadron of 4 Regiment, Army Air Corps in 1969.

=== Army Air Corps ===
664 Aviation Squadron AAC was formed from the air troops of the parachute battalions of 16 Parachute Brigade and based at Jersey Brow hangar at the Royal Aircraft Establishment, Farnborough. In 1971 it was renamed 664 Parachute Squadron AAC. When the brigade was disbanded the Squadron reverted to being known as 664 Aviation Squadron AAC.

It was disbanded during March 1978 to be reformed from 658 Squadron on 1 April 1978.

- Minden | 1981-1983
- Minden | 1983-1990
- Detmold | 1990-1994
- Dishforth | 1994 - 2006
- Wattisham | 2006–present

664 Squadron transitioned to the Apache AH.1 Attack Helicopter in 2004 at Dishforth Airfield, North Yorkshire, alongside 656 and 672 Squadrons. 664 was the first squadron to fire the Hellfire missile, during a trials in Canada. The squadron was then worked up to its first deployment on Op Herrick, Afghanistan, the second Apache unit to do so. It spent many of the next 7 years conducting operational tours to Helmand Province in Afghanistan where it was initially part of the Joint Helicopter Force (UK JHF(A)), and then from 2010 part of the UK's Joint Aviation Group based at Camp Bastion under command of the USMC Expeditionary Force, flying in direct support of conventional forces on the ground such as Task Force Helmand and the Afghan Security Forces as well as Special Forces from a number of Coalition nations. The Squadron moved from Dishforth in 2006, to Wattisham Flying Station, Suffolk, where it comes under 4 Regiment AAC. The Squadron transitioned to the new AH-64E Guardian in 2024, it being one of the last units to fly the legacy Longbow platform.

== See also ==
- List of Army Air Corps aircraft units
- List of Royal Air Force aircraft squadrons
