= Geoffrey Wellum =

British fighter pilot (1921–2018)

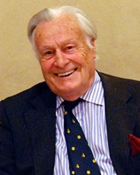
- Geoffrey Wellum in 2009
- Born: Geoffrey Harry Augustus Wellum; 4 August 1921; Walthamstow, Essex, England
- Died: 18 July 2018 (aged 96); Mullion, Cornwall, England
- Military career
- Allegiance: United Kingdom
- Branch: Royal Air Force
- Service years: 1939–1961
- Rank: Squadron Leader
- Service number: 42925
- Conflicts: Battle of Britain
- Awards: Distinguished Flying Cross

Squadron Leader Geoffrey Harris Augustus Wellum DFC (4 August 1921 – 18 July 2018) was a British fighter pilot and author, best known for his participation in the Battle of Britain. Born an only child in Walthamstow, Essex, Wellum was educated at Forest School, Snaresbrook before serving in the RAF. After the war he remained in the RAF until 1961, and later ran a haulage business. In the mid-1980s he retired and moved to Mullion, Cornwall, where he wrote down his wartime memoirs. In 2002 these were published as First Light.

== Early life ==
Geoffrey Wellum was born on 4 August 1921, an only child, in Walthamstow, Essex, to Percy and Edith Wellum. His father, who had served at Gallipoli during WW1, ran an off-licence. Wellum was educated at Forest School, Snaresbrook, where he captained the school cricket team.

== Career ==
=== Second World War ===
==== 1939-40 ====
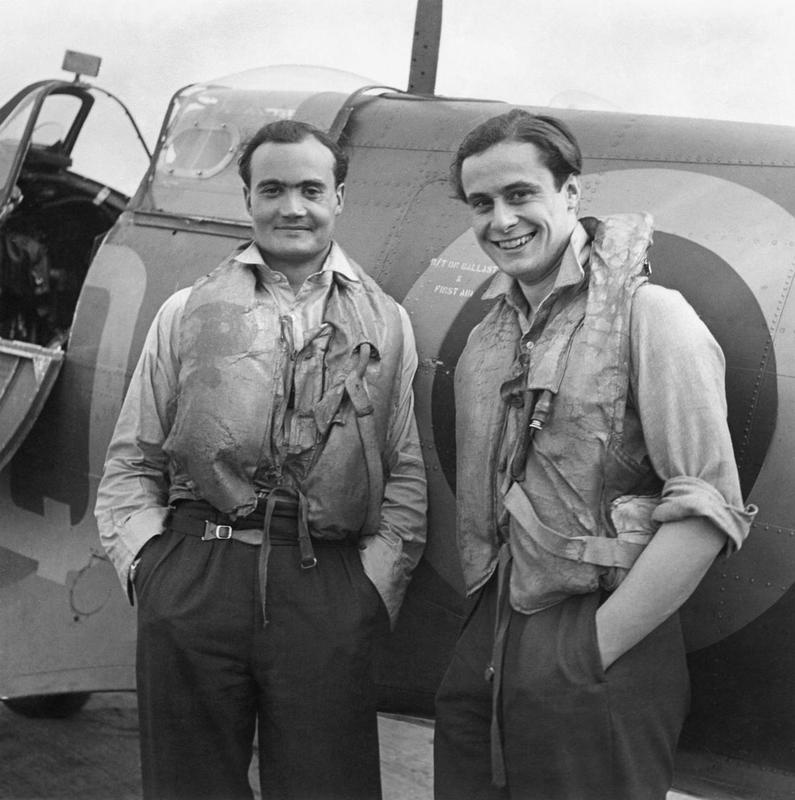
Flight Lieutenant Brian Kingcome (left), commanding officer of No. 92 Squadron Royal Air Force and his wingman, Flying Officer Geoffrey Wellum, next to a Supermarine Spitfire at RAF Biggin Hill, Kent, 1941

Aged eighteen, Wellum signed up on a short-service commission with the Royal Air Force in August 1939. The first aircraft he flew was the Tiger Moth at Desford airfield in Leicestershire. Wellum's first solo flight was on 1 September 1939. Two days later Britain declared war on Germany. After successfully completing the course he then went on to fly the North American Harvard at RAF Little Rissington with 6FTS.

In May 1940, before his flight training was complete, Wellum was posted to 92 Squadron, which was a combat squadron flying Spitfires. It was at 92 Squadron that he first encountered a Spitfire, and flew the aircraft for the first time. Later, in First Light, he wrote of the experience: "I experienced an exhilaration that I cannot recall ever having felt before. It was like one of those wonderful dreams, a Peter Pan sort of dream".

Wellum's first commanding officer was Roger Bushell, (later immortalised in The Great Escape). Bushell was shot down and captured almost immediately after Wellum's arrival, and was later executed by the Gestapo in the aftermath of the "Great Escape".

Much later, in an unpublished interview with The Times, Wellum recalled: "After I joined the squadron they went to Dunkirk and by the end of that day we'd lost five people, four of whom I'd met the night before in the officers' mess. I thought, 'Hold on a minute, this is bloody dangerous!’ "

Soon after Dunkirk, 92 Squadron was transferred from RAF Duxford in Cambridgeshire to RAF Pembrey in Carmarthenshire, Wales. It was there that Wellum began his combat career, "chasing isolated German aircraft all over the south-west".

Wellum saw extensive action during the Battle of Britain. Although just 18, he was not the youngest pilot to fight in the battle, an honour which is currently held by Martyn Aurel King, born 15 October 1921 -) despite being nicknamed "Boy" by his colleagues. On 9 September 1940, 92 Squadron was posted to RAF Biggin Hill in Kent, in the centre of the fighting. Of the numerous Bf 109 fighters which escorted the German bombers, Wellum wrote "God, is there no end to them? The sun glints on their wings and bellies as they roll like trout in a stream streaking over smooth round pebbles. Trout streams, water meadows, waders, fast-flowing water, the pretty barmaid at the inn. Dear Jesus why this?"

Wellum's close colleagues included Brian Kingcome.

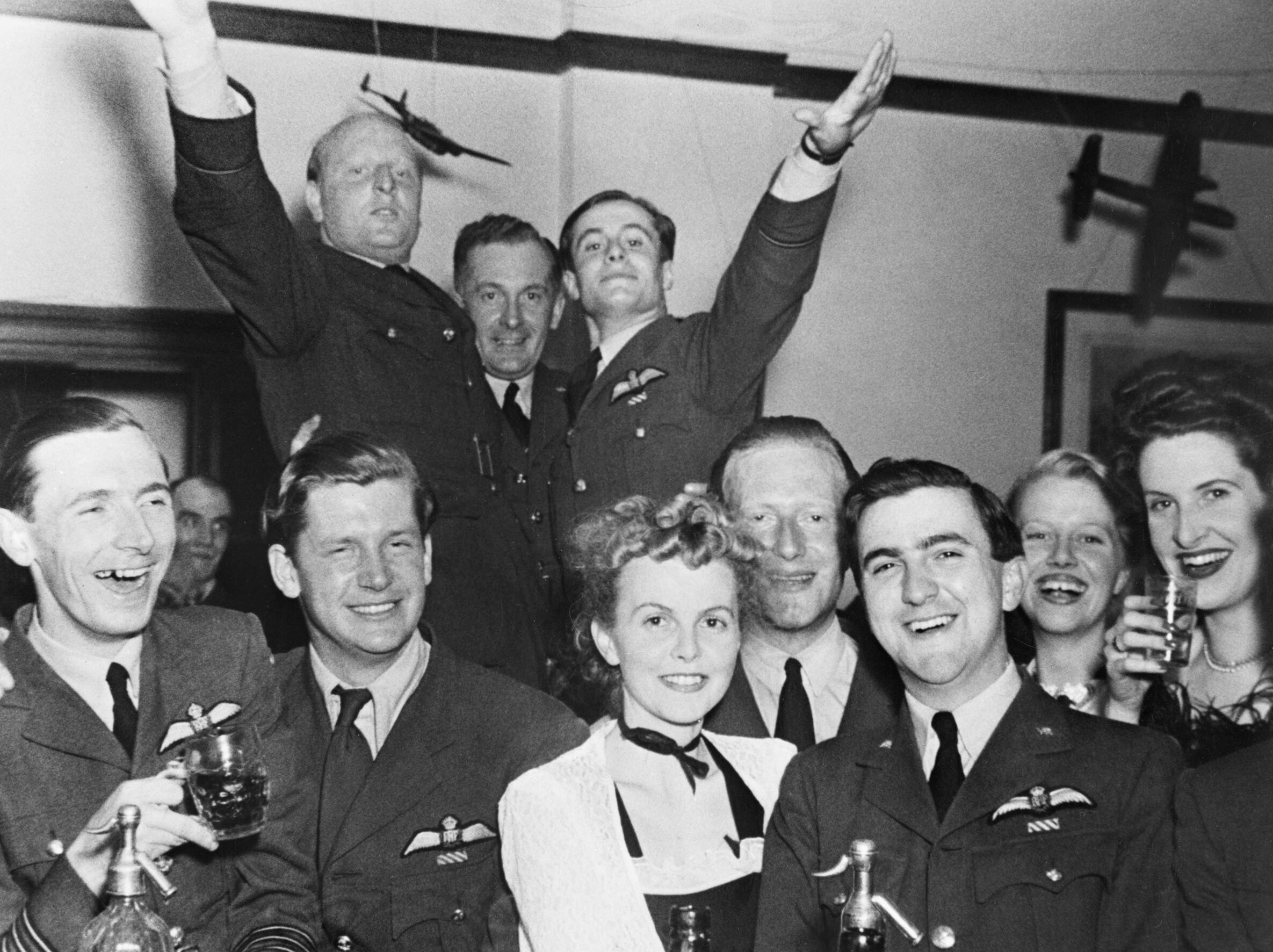
Officers and guests celebrating the first anniversary of the arrival of No. 92 Squadron RAF at RAF Biggin Hill, September 1941. Front row, (left to right): Wg Cdr John A. Kent (Kentowski), Flt Lt Anthony Bartley, Mrs Wade, Flt Lt Robert Holland, Plt Off Trevor Wade and two unidentified ladies. In the back – Plt Off Sebastian Maitland-Thompson, Fg Off Tom Wiesse (Intelligence Officer) and Fg Off Geoffrey Wellum.

Wellum claimed a Heinkel He 111 shot down on 11 September, and a quarter share in a Junkers Ju 88 downed on 27 September 1940. Two (and one shared) Messerschmitt Bf 109s were claimed "damaged" during November 1940.

==== 1941 ====
In the summer of 1941 Wellum participated in more than 50 "sweeps" over occupied France (also known as Circus offensives) flying escort for Blenheim and Stirling bomber formations, taking the war to the enemy. He claimed a Bf 109 shot down on 9 July 1941 over France, and in August 1941, Wellum was awarded the Distinguished Flying Cross.

By this time most of Wellum's original colleagues at 92 squadron had been killed or captured; he survived owing to a combination of luck and skill. Later, Wellum recalled: "You make yourself a difficult target. Never stay still, never fly straight and level, chuck it around. Quite often you'd find yourself surrounded by aeroplanes and then the sky would be empty. 'Where's everybody gone?’ It was then that you were in danger. It was the German you didn't see who shot you down."

In the summer of 1941 Wellum was taken off active duty, and assigned to a training squadron: No 52 Operational Training Unit at Aston Down, flying Hawker Hurricanes. Disappointed to be leaving frontline service, Wellum initially found the experience to be "almost unbearable". Eventually, Wellum relaxed: "I found a new peace and...gradually I seemed to unwind. I even began to enjoy [teaching] pupils".

==== 1942 ====
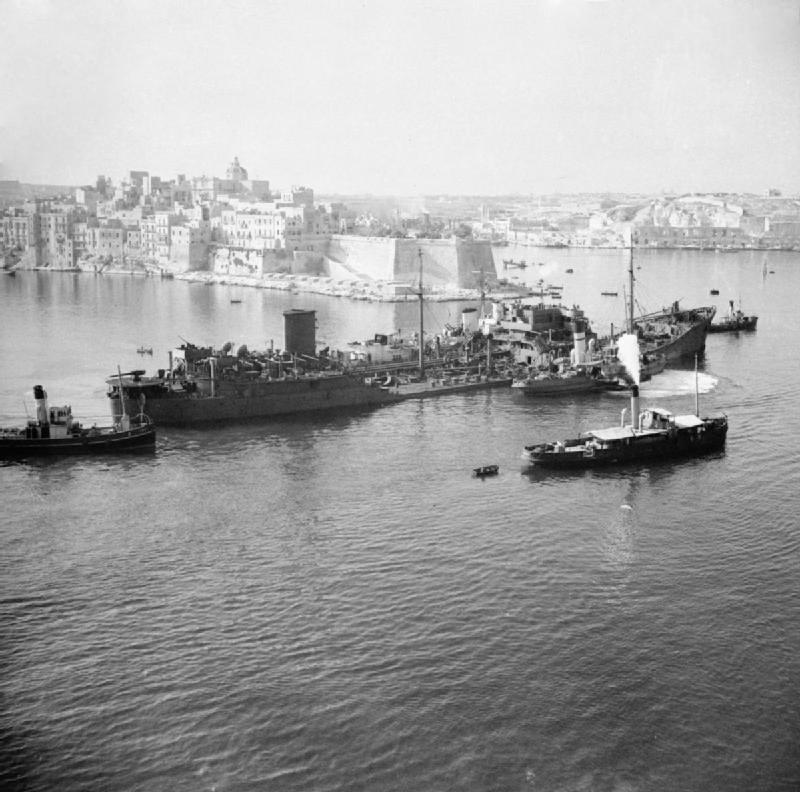
SS Ohio enters Grand Harbour, 15 August 1942

In February 1942, he was reassigned to combat duties, being transferred to 65 Squadron based at Debden, where he was appointed a Flight Commander in March 1942. By now, the Luftwaffe was flying a new fighter aircraft, the Focke-Wulf Fw 190, superior in all but turn radius to the Spitfire V, and the squadron took heavy losses. "Quite simply, the Fw 190 outclasses our Spitfire 5Bs. It is 40mph faster, has very good armament and a very high rate of roll". In air combat over France, Wellum's number two, Freddie Haskett, was killed by a Fw 190, and Wellum himself survived only by "throwing the Spit all over the sky without really looking round". At this time he began to develop severe headaches, "a splitting headache pain across my eyes".

In July 1942, Wellum was sent to Glasgow, where he participated in Operation Pedestal, a convoy mission to carry supplies for the relief of the besieged garrison at Malta. Wellum led a flight of eight Spitfires to be carried on aircraft carrier HMS Furious, sailing from the Clyde to the Mediterranean, and then land them on the island. On 11 August 1942, Wellum led his flight of eight Spitfires, flying without ammunition to save weight (the .303 cartridges were replaced with cigarettes), and landed at Luqa airfield on Malta, joining 145 Squadron on air defence duties.

The convoy was heavily damaged by German and Italian forces, and many ships were sunk. Wellum witnessed the arrival at Valletta Harbour of the few remaining ships, including, last of all, the desperately-needed oil tanker SS Ohio, barely afloat, escorted by two destroyers:

As the three ships come through the harbour entrance, just about maintaining steerage way, the cheering of the Maltese who have to welcome her in slowly subsides until there is absolute silence. Some of them men, mostly elderly, take off their hats and the womenfolk in their black hoods and cloaks cross themselves. From the fort a bugle sounds the "Still" and not a soul moves.

On Malta, Wellum was diagnosed with severe sinusitis and battle fatigue, after three years of intensive frontline flying. After surgery, he returned from Malta to Britain via Gibraltar, and later became a test pilot for new aircraft, such as the new Hawker Typhoon fighter-bomber, based at Gloster Aircraft.

==== 1943 ====
After his return to England, Wellum did not return to combat duties, instead finishing the war as a gunnery instructor. In 1943, he married Grace Neil, his wartime girlfriend, with whom he had three children.

Life for Wellum at the end of his career as a fighter pilot was never quite the same. "I am certain that my time came with my three years as an operational fighter pilot in our nation's finest hour. My only regret is that it had to happen so early in life".

Dates	Aircraft	Result
11 September 1940	Heinkel He 111	Destroyed
27 September 1940	Junkers Ju 88	Destroyed, 1/4 share
November 1940	Messerschmitt Bf 109	Damaged
November 1940	Messerschmitt Bf 109	Damaged
November 1940	Messerschmitt Bf 109	Damaged, 1/2 share
9 July 1941	Messerschmitt Bf 109	Destroyed

=== After the war ===
After the war, Wellum stayed with the RAF, achieving Squadron Leader rank.

He served first as a staff officer in the Second Tactical Air Force in West Germany, where he flew jet aircraft such as the Gloster Meteor, the de Havilland Vampire and the English Electric Canberra.

He was also stationed at RAF Gaydon, and in East Anglia. This was followed by a four-year tour with 192 Squadron.

The family settled in Epping, Essex.

Wellum left the Royal Air Force in 1960 and took over the family haulage business. Later he became a commodities broker.

== Personal life ==
His birth was registered in West Ham, London, in Q3 1921, the only child of Percy H Wellum and Edith J Freeman, who were married in Windsor Q4 1918. In Q3 1943 in Westminster Wellum married Dorothy G C Neil, born Q4 1922 in Romford. They had two daughters and a son. He and his wife were divorced in 1975.

== Retirement ==
He retired from the RAF in 1961 to take up a position with a firm of commodity brokers in the City of London until his retirement to Cornwall where he still lived when ‘First Light’ was published in 2002.

In the mid-1980s, with the family business in liquidation and his divorce pending, Wellum retired, as he had promised himself in his youth, to The Lizard peninsula, Cornwall, settling in Mullion. He joined the local choir, and became deputy harbourmaster.

To prove to himself that he had actually done something with his life, Wellum took his wartime notebooks and wrote a longhand memoir of his time as a Spitfire pilot, that he never intended for publication. He was a member of the Royal Air Force Club. He was awarded the Freedom of the City of London.

== First Light ==
Approached in 2000 by author James Holland who was researching a novel set during the Battle of Britain, Wellum lent him his unpublished memoir (see "First Light", below), Holland showed it to friends in publishing at Penguin Books and, in 2002, Eleo Gordon, Penguin's editorial director, approached Wellum with a publishing deal – two decades after he had originally written the memoir. First Light: The Story of the Boy Who Became a Man in the War-Torn Skies Above Britain was published by: Viking Books, 2002 (hardcover, ISBN 0-670-91248-4); Wiley & Sons, 2003 (hardcover, ISBN 0-471-42627-X); Penguin Books, 2003 (paperback, ISBN 0-14-100814-8); Penguin Books, 2020 (paperback, ISBN 978-0-241-98784-1), which contains a new foreword by military historian and novelist Patrick Bishop.

== Television ==
Wellum has contributed to various television documentaries on the Battle of Britain, including Spitfire Ace produced by RDF Media/Channel 4 (2004), Dangerous Adventures for Boys produced by Channel 5 (2008), and The Spitfire: Britain's Flying Past produced by the BBC (September 2011).

To mark the 70th anniversary of the Battle of Britain, the BBC commissioned a one-off drama for TV called First Light, based on Wellum's book of the same name. The film was first shown by the BBC on 14 September 2010 with Wellum himself narrating and the young Wellum played by Sam Heughan.

Wellum also appeared in the documentary "Greatest Events of World War II in colour," being interviewed on his experience at the Battle of Britain. The series aired on Netflix in 2019, after his death, and the episode "Battle of Britain" is dedicated in his memory.

== Honours and awards ==
- 5 August 1941 - Flying Officer Geoffrey Harry Augustus Wellum (42925) of No. 92 Squadron RAF is awarded the Distinguished Flying Cross (DFC) in recognition of gallantry displayed in flying operations against the enemy:

This officer has been with his squadron since the evacuation of Dunkirk. During the recent offensive operations over France he has led his section and flight with great skill and determination. He has destroyed at least three enemy aircraft and damaged several others.

— London Gazette
