= Enquin-lez-Guinegatte =

Enquin-lez-Guinegatte Enken-Inwinegate
- Commune
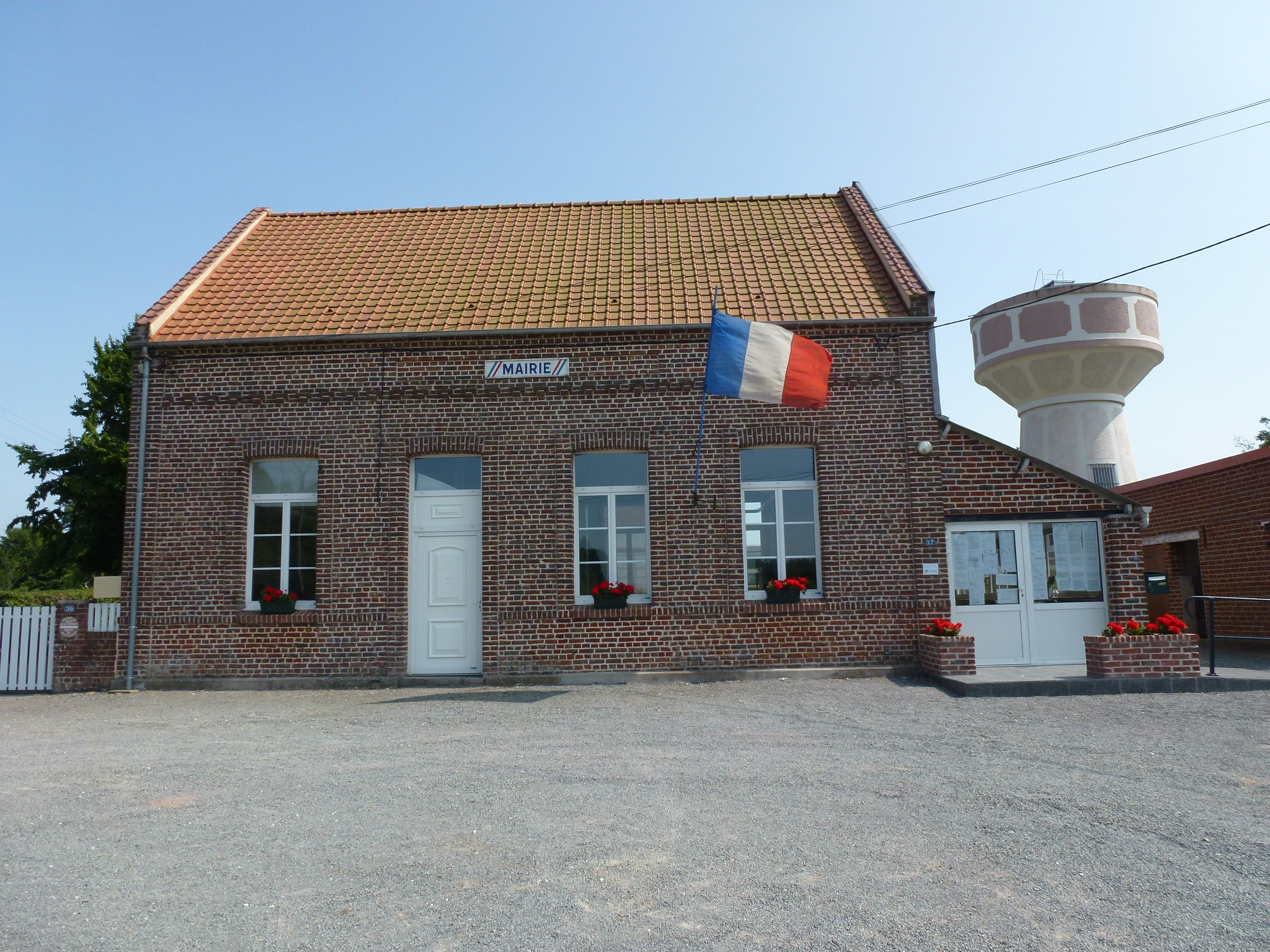
- The town hall of Enquin-lez-Guinegatte
- Location of Enquin-lez-Guinegatte
- Location within France Location within Hauts-de-France
- Coordinates: 50°36′32″N 2°16′19″E
- Country: France
- Region: Hauts-de-France
- Department: Pas-de-Calais
- Arrondissement: Saint-Omer
- Canton: Fruges
- Intercommunality: CA Pays de Saint-Omer

Government
  - Mayor (2020–2026): Hervé Dupont
- Area^{1}: 20.02 km^{2} (7.73 sq mi)
- Population (2023): 1,594
  - Density: 79.62/km^{2} (206.2/sq mi)
- Time zone: UTC+01:00 (CET)
  - Summer (DST): UTC+02:00 (CEST)
- INSEE/Postal code: 62295 /62145
- ^{1} French Land Register data, which excludes lakes, ponds, glaciers > 1 km^{2} (0.386 sq mi or 247 acres) and river estuaries.

Enquin-lez-Guinegatte (French pronunciation: [ɑ̃kɛ̃ le ɡinɡat]; West Flemish: Enken-Inwinegate) is a commune in the department of Pas-de-Calais, northern France. The municipality was established on 1 January 2017 by merger of the former communes of Enquin-les-Mines (the seat) and Enguinegatte.

== See also ==
- Communes of the Pas-de-Calais department
