= Oren John Rose =

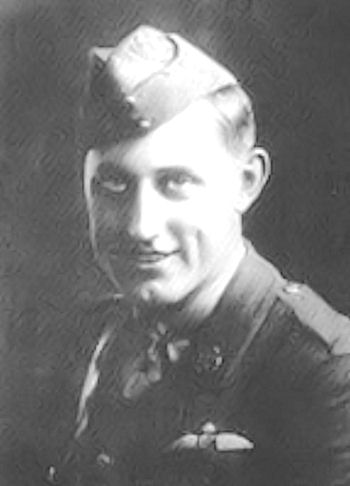
- Oren John Rose, 1918
- Born: 23 March 1892; Platte County, Missouri, USA
- Died: 21 June 1971 (aged 79); Sunnyvale, California, USA
- Military career
- Allegiance: United States
- Branch: Royal Air Force (United Kingdom)
- Rank: Captain
- Unit: Royal Air Force: No. 92 Squadron RAF
- Conflicts: World War I
- Awards: Distinguished Flying Cross with Bar

Captain Oren John Rose, usually referred to as O. J. Rose (23 March 1892 – 21 June 1971) was a World War I flying ace credited with 16 aerial victories.

== World War I ==
Rose joined the Royal Flying Corps in 1917. He went to France, and was assigned to 92 Squadron. Flying one of four different RAF SE.5as, he tallied up his victories between 30 July and 4 November 1918, becoming the top scoring ace of No. 92 Squadron RAF.

He tallied 14 enemy airplanes destroyed, including one shared with James Victor Gascoyne, and two "driven down out of control".

== After World War I ==
In 1919, Rose fought in the Russian Civil War.

He returned to the US and went into business, becoming a car dealer in Marysville, Ohio.

During World War II, Rose joined the U.S. Army Air Corps as an operations and training officer in Kentucky. He moved on to a squadron command in Louisiana during 1943 and 1944. By the time he was discharged in 1946, Rose had become commander of the Aircraft Assignment Base at Wright Field.

He returned to his auto business, from which he retired in the 1960s.

== Honors and awards ==
Distinguished Flying Cross (DFC)

Lieut. Oren John Rose. (FRANCE)

An officer who has accounted for nine enemy aeroplanes. On 29 September, he observed an enemy scout attacking some of their machines; engaging it, he drove it down from 15,000 feet to 6,000 feet, when it fell in flames. On his return journey, he attacked and destroyed their enemy two-seater.

Distinguished Flying Cross (DFC) Bar

Lt (A./Capt.) Oren John Rose, D.F.C. (FRANCE)

== See also ==
- List of World War I flying aces from the United States

== Bibliography ==
- SE 5/5a Aces of World War I. Norman Franks. Osprey Publishing, 2007. ISBN 1-84603-180-X, 9781846031809.
- American Aces of World War 1 Harry Dempsey. Osprey Publishing, 2001. ISBN 1-84176-375-6, ISBN 978-1-84176-375-0.
