= No. 92 Squadron RAF =

Royal Air Force unit established during WW1

No. 92 (East India) Squadron RAF
- Squadron badge
- Active: 1 Sep 1917 – 1 April 1918 (RFC); 1 April 1918 – 7 Aug 1919 (RAF); 10 October 1939 – 30 Dec 1946; 31 Jan 1947 – 31 March 1977; 1 April 1977 – 1 July 1991; 23 Sep 1992 – 1 October 1994; 30 June 2009 – present
- Country: United Kingdom
- Branch: Royal Air Force
- Type: Non-flying squadron
- Role: Tactics and training squadron
- Part of: Air Warfare Centre
- Home station: RAF Waddington
- Nickname: East India
- Mottos: Aut pugna aut morere (Latin for 'Either fight or die')
- Battle honours: Western Front (1918); Somme (1918); Hindenburg Line; Amiens; Home Defence 1940–1941; France & Low Countries (1940); Battle of Britain (1940)*; Fortress Europe (1941–1941)*; Egypt and Libya (1942–1943); El Alamein; El Hamma; Mediterranean (1943); Sicily (1943); Italy (1943–1945); Anzio and Nettuno; Gustav Line; Gothic Line; * Honours marked with an asterisk may be emblazoned on the Squadron Standard

Insignia
- Squadron badge heraldry: A cobra entwining a sprig of maple leaf. The maple leaf signifies the squadron's association as a Canadian unit in the First World War whilst the cobra represents that the squadron was one of the East India gift squadrons during the Second World War. Awarded by King George VI in January 1942.
- Squadron codes: GR (Apr 1939 – May 1940); QJ (May 1940 – Dec 1946); DL (Jan 1947 – Sep 1950) (formerly No. 91 Sqn); 8L (Sep 1950 – Apr 1951)
- Post-1950 squadron roundel

Number 92 Squadron, also known as No. 92 (East India) Squadron and currently as No. 92 Tactics and Training Squadron, of the Royal Air Force is a test and evaluation squadron based at RAF Waddington, Lincolnshire.

It was formed as part of the Royal Flying Corps at London Colney as a fighter squadron on 1 September 1917. It deployed to France in July 1918 and saw action for just four months, until the end of the war. During the conflict it flew both air superiority and direct ground support missions. It was disbanded at Eil on 7 August 1919.

Following the outbreak of the Second World War, No. 92 Squadron reformed on 10 October 1939, at RAF Tangmere. The unit initially received Bristol Blenheim IF heavy fighters, but in the spring of 1940 it re-equipped with Supermarine Spitfires, going on to fight in the Battle of Britain. Later in the war it served in the Mediterranean Theatre of Operations, in Egypt, Malta, and subsequently in Sicily and mainland Italy.

Reformed after the war in January 1947, No. 92 (Fighter) Squadron was assigned to RAF Fighter Command flying the Gloster Meteor F.3. Between 1961 and 1962, No. 92 (F) Squadron was the RAF's official aerobatic team, known as the Blue Diamonds, flying 16 Hawker Hunter F.6s. In December 1965, the squadron was reassigned to RAF Germany alongside No. 19 (F) Squadron, flying the English Electric Lightning F.2/F.2A and from January 1977, the McDonnell Douglas Phantom FGR.2. Disbanded in July 1991, the Squadron was reformed as No. 92 (Reserve) Squadron at RAF Chivenor flying the British Aerospace Hawk until October 1994. No. 92 Squadron then lay dormant for the next 14 years before being reformed at Royal Air Force College Cranwell on 30 June 2009.

== Operational history ==
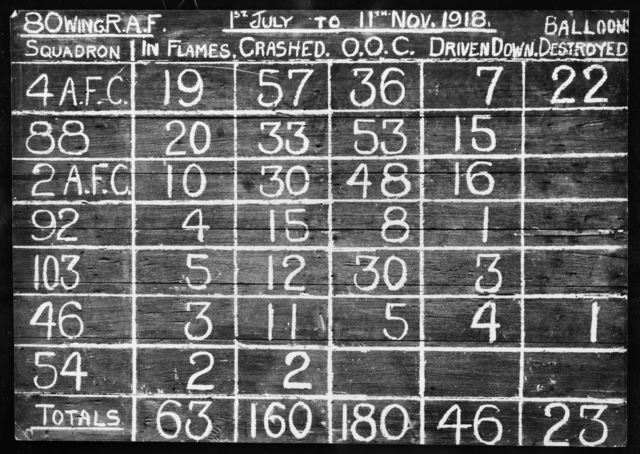
Serny, France, November 1918. A score board recording the claims for enemy aircraft destroyed by No. 80 Wing from July–November 1918. The squadrons listed are: No. 92 Squadron, No. 4 Squadron, Australian Flying Corps (AFC), No. 88 Squadron, No. 2 Squadron AFC, No. 103 Squadron, No. 46 Squadron, and No. 54 Squadron. The other columns are headed "In Flames", "Crashed", "O.O.C." (Out of Control), "Driven Down" and "Balloons Destroyed"."

=== First World War ===
No. 92 Squadron was established as part of the Royal Flying Corps at London Colney on 1 September 1917, working up as a scout squadron with Sopwith Pups, SPAD S.VIIs, and Royal Aircraft Factory SE.5as. The Squadron became part of the Royal Air Force on its formation on 1 April 1918. Standardising on SE.5as, the squadron went to France in July 1918, at first operating in the Dunkirk area. It was then moved to Serny in August 1918, where it began scoring victories. During the Somme Offensive of 1918 the squadron was heavily involved, and continued to operate over the Western Front until the Armistice. It was disbanded on 7 August 1919, while stationed at Eil with the Army of Occupation. It had claimed a total of 38 victories during its World War I service. Eight aces had served in the squadron, including Oren Rose, Thomas Stanley Horry, William Reed, Earl Frederick Crabb, future Air Chief Marshal James Robb, Evander Shapard, Herbert Good, and future Air Marshal Arthur Coningham.

=== Second World War ===
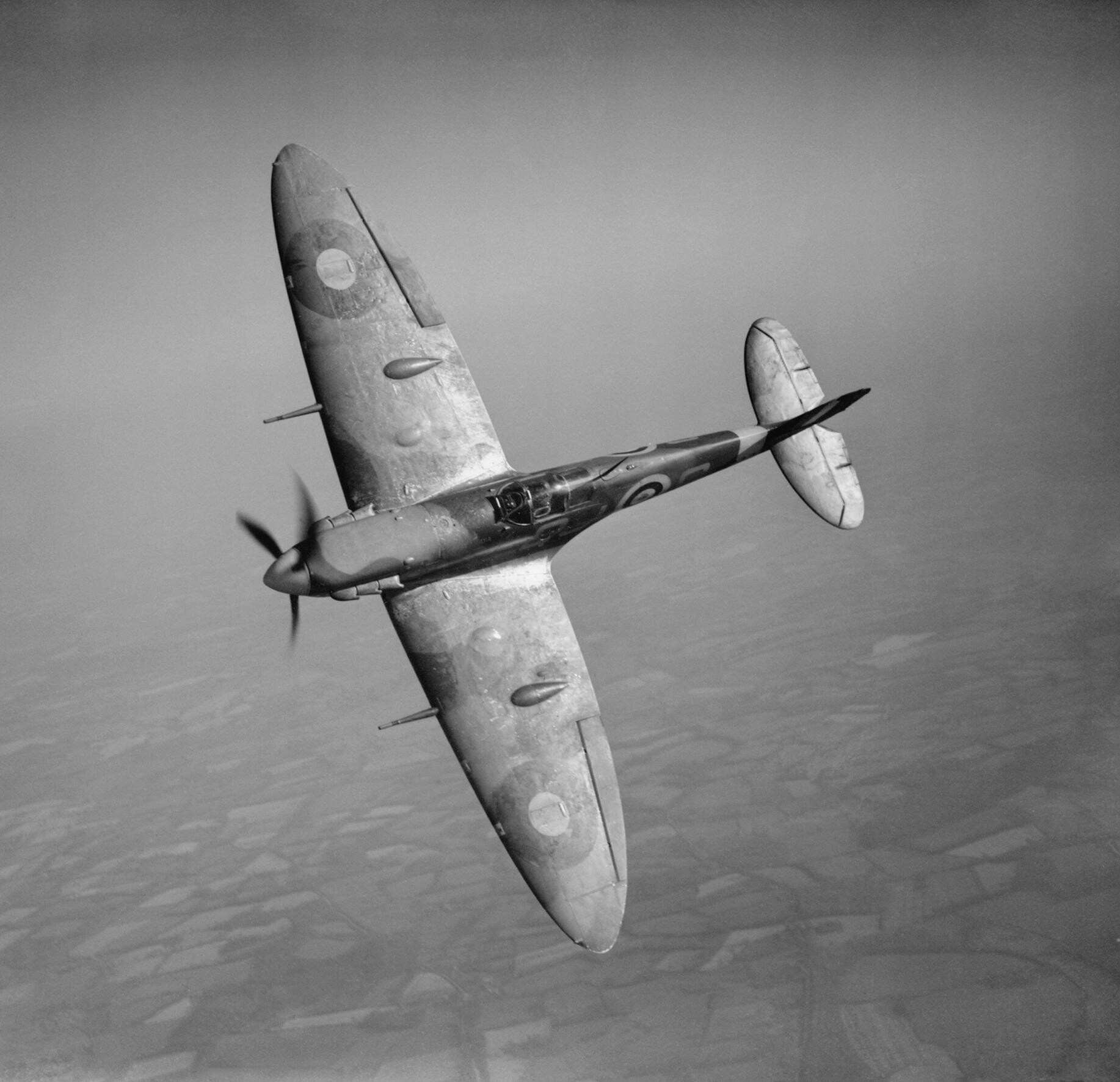
Supermarine Spitfire Mk.Vb R6923 of No. 92 Squadron in 1941.

Following the outbreak of the Second World War, No. 92 Squadron was reformed on 10 October 1939 at RAF Tangmere, West Sussex. Initially it flew Bristol Blenheim Mk.IFs but in March 1940 they were replaced by the Supermarine Spitfire Mk.I, which became operational on 9 May. No. 92 Squadron first saw action over the Dunkirk evacuation beaches flying from RAF Croydon. During the latter stages of the Battle of Britain No. 92 Squadron flew from RAF Biggin Hill.

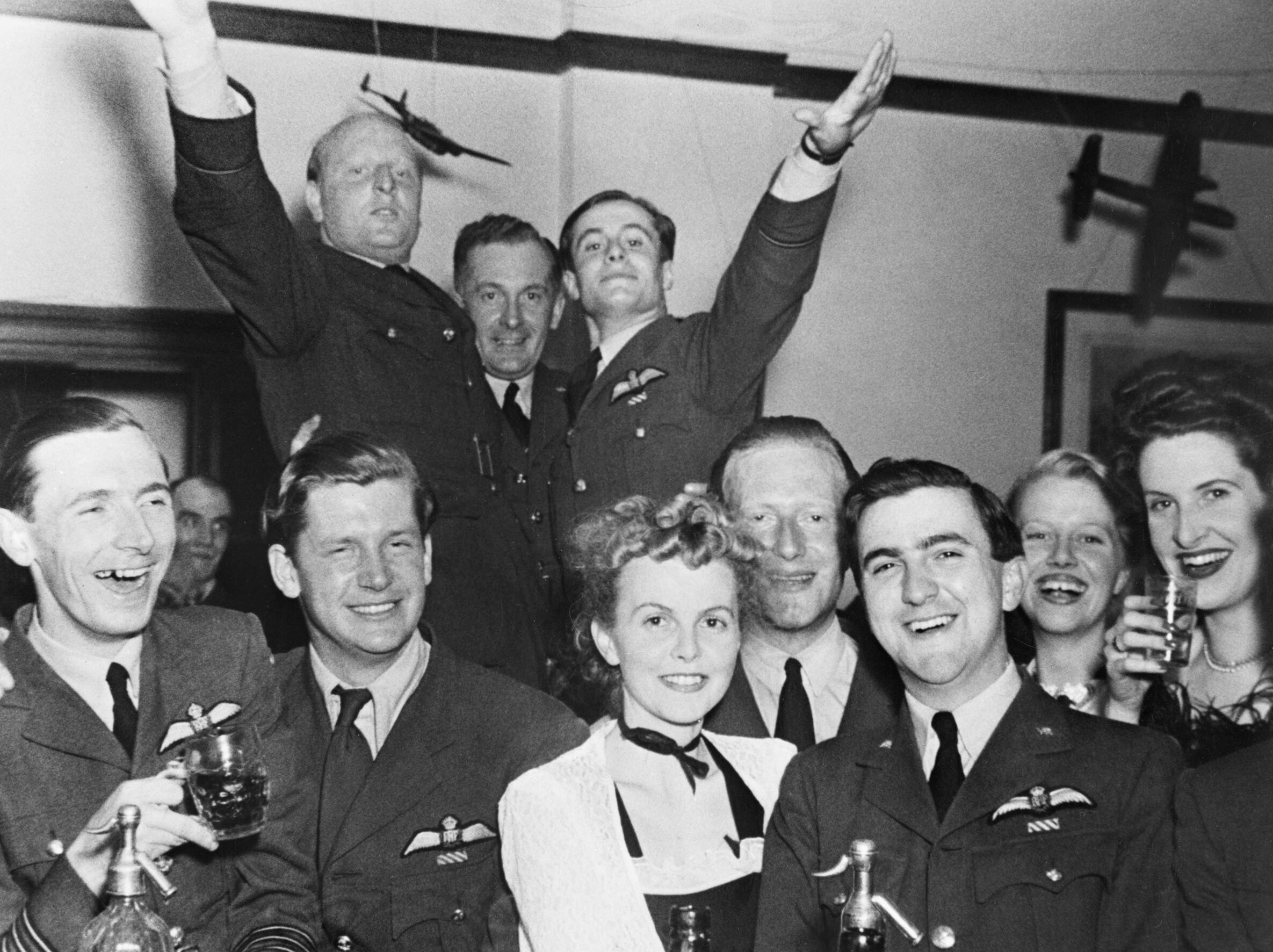
Officers and guests celebrating the first anniversary of the arrival of No. 92 Squadron RAF at RAF Biggin Hill, September 1941. The group includes, in the front row, (left to right): Wing Commander John A. Kent (Kentowski), Flight Lieutenant Anthony Bartley, Mrs Wade, Flight Lieutenant Robert Holland, Pilot Officer Trevor Wade and two unidentified ladies. And in the back - Pilot Officer Sebastian Maitland-Thompson, Flying Officer Tom Weiss (Intelligence Officer) and Flying Officer Geoffrey Wellum.

In February 1942, the Squadron was posted to Egypt to join Air Headquarters Western Desert to support the Allies on the ground. Personnel arrived in Egypt in April but no aircraft were available. Some pilots flew operations with Hawker Hurricanes of No. 80 Squadron. Spitfires finally arrived in August and the squadron commenced operations from RAF Heliopolis over the El Alamein sector, and then with their Spitfire Vs at Landing Ground 173 in the Western Desert. No. 92 Squadron provided air cover at the Battle of El Alamein and on 18 April 1943, 11 Spitfires from the squadron flew top cover at the Palm Sunday Massacre during which approximately 75 axis aircraft were disabled or destroyed. Following the Allied victory in North Africa, the Squadron moved to Malta in June. It went on to provide air cover for the 8th Army during the campaigns in Sicily and Italy, arriving on Italian soil on 14 September 1943. No. 92 Squadron then followed the armies up the Italian coast as part of No. 244 Wing and No. 211 (Offensive Fighter) Group. During World War II the Squadron claimed the highest number of victories scored, 317, in the RAF.

=== Cold War ===
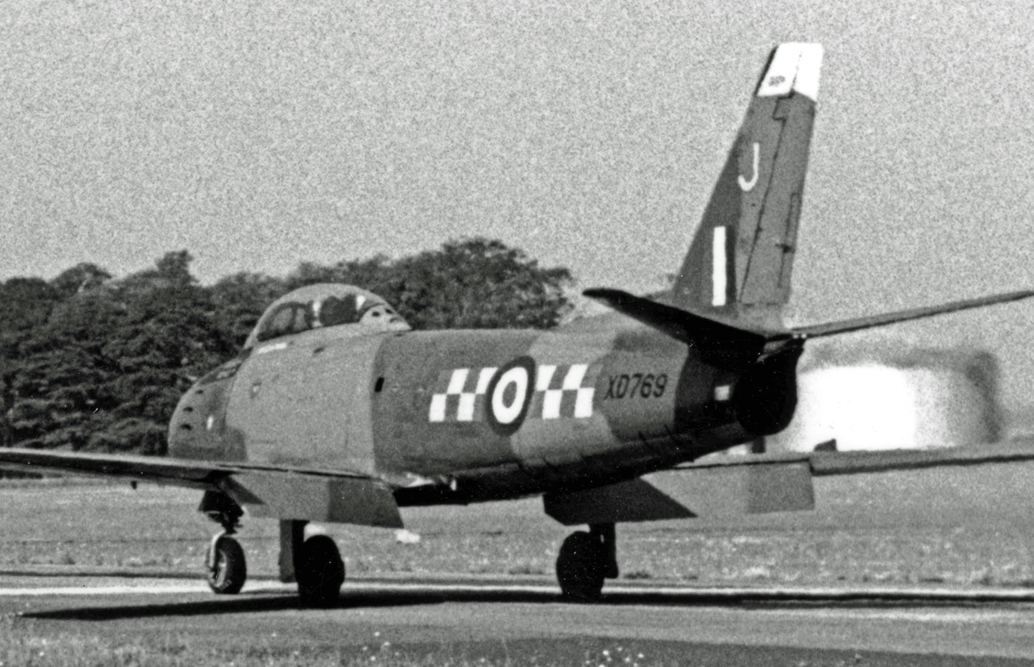
No. 92 (F) Squadron Canadair Sabre F.4 XD769 in 1955 wearing the squadron's red and yellow check markings on its fuselage

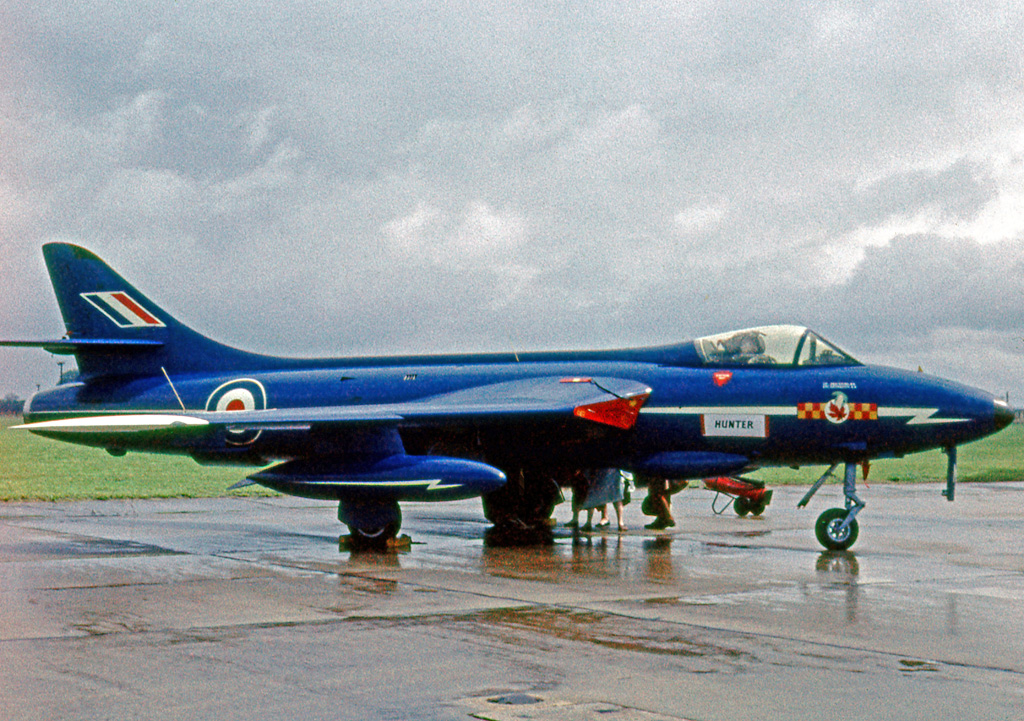
Hawker Hunter F.6 XG189 of No. 92 (F) Squadron's "Blue Diamonds" aerobatic team in 1962.

Following the cessation of hostilities, No. 92 Squadron was disbanded at Zeltweg in Austria on 30 December 1946. No. 91 Squadron was disbanded on 31 January 1947 at RAF Acklington and re-numbered as No. 92 (Fighter) Squadron as part of RAF Fighter Command with the Gloster Meteor F.3. The Squadron relocated to RAF Duxford on 15 February 1947 before moving onto RAF Linton-on-Ouse in October 1949. It went on a goodwill tour of Scandinavia in 1949. Subsequently, equipped with the Meteor F.8, it received the Canadair Sabre F.4 in February 1954, becoming part of the only Sabre wing in Fighter Command alongside No. 66 Squadron, before getting the Hawker Hunter F.4 in April 1956 while based at RAF Linton-on-Ouse. Throughout this period, No. 92 (F) Squadron was also based at RAF Middleton St. George, RAF Thornaby and RAF Leconfield.

In 1961, No. 92 (F) Squadron, under the command of Sqn. Ldr. Brian Mercer, was chosen as Fighter Command's official aerobatic squadron – the RAF Aerobatic Display Team, taking over from "Treble One"'s Black Arrows. Originally forming in 1960, the team was initially called the Falcons before later adopting the name the Blue Diamonds under which they operated 16 bright blue painted Hawker Hunter F.6s. No. 92 (F) Squadron thrilled the crowds with its precision display including looping a formation of 18 aircraft, only four fewer than the world record 22 Hawker Hunters looped by the Black Arrows of No. 111 (F) Squadron at the Farnborough Airshow in September 1958. When they re-equipped with the English Electric Lightning F.2 from April 1963 onward they continued to perform with these.

In December 1965, along with No. 19 (F) Squadron they were reallocated to RAF Germany initially at RAF Geilenkirchen, moving to join No. 19 (F) Squadron at RAF Gütersloh. They remained at RAF Gütersloh from January 1968 until the Squadron disbanded on 31 March 1977.

In January 1977, No. 92 (Designate) Squadron had begun training as a McDonnell Douglas Phantom FGR.2 air defence unit at RAF Wildenrath and on 1 April this unit formally adopted the No. 92 (F) numberplate.

On 25 May 1982, RAF Phantom XV422 of 92 Sqn shot down RAF Jaguar XX963 of 14 Sqn from RAF Bruggen with a Sidewinder, over Germany, by mistake when the Phantom pilot did not realise that he was fully armed.

On 17 August 1990, Phantoms from No. 92 (F) Squadron and No. 19 (F) Squadron were sent to RAF Akrotiri, Cyprus, to provide air defence due to the deployment of No. V (AC) Squadron and No. 29 (F) Squadron from Akrotiri to Dhahran Airfield after the Iraqi Invasion of Kuwait. Due to the rundown of RAF Germany following the fall of the Berlin Wall the Squadron disbanded on 1 July 1991.

=== Hawks to the Air Warfare Centre ===
On 23 September 1992, No. 151 (Reserve) Squadron was renumbered No. 92 (Reserve) Squadron at RAF Chivenor as part of No. 7 Flying Training School (FTS) for weapons training, flying the British Aerospace Hawk T.1. With the transfer of No. 7 FTS weapons training role to No. 4 FTS at RAF Valley, No. 92 (R) Squadron was disbanded on 1 October 1994.

In November 2008, it was announced that the Tactics and Training Wing of the Air Warfare Centre was to become No. 92 (Reserve) Tactics and Training Squadron. The Squadron officially stood up after 14 years on 30 June 2009 at the College Hall at RAFC Cranwell. On 1 February 2018, the Royal Air Force rescinded all (Reserve) nameplates changing No. 92 (Reserve) Tactics and Training Squadron to No. 92 Tactics and Training Squadron. As part of their work at the Air Warfare Centre, No. 92 Squadron helped design and carry out Exercise Cobra Warrior 2019 for units of the RAF, Luftwaffe, Italian and Israeli Air Forces.

== Aircraft operated ==
Aircraft operated include:

- Sopwith Pup (Sep 1917–Apr 1918)
- Royal Aircraft Factory SE.5a (Mar 1918–Nov 1918)
- Bristol Blenheim Mk.IF (Oct 1939–Mar 1940)
- Supermarine Spitfire Mk.I/Ib (Mar 1940–Feb 1941)
- Supermarine Spitfire Mk.Vb (Feb 1941–Feb 1942; Aug 1942–Sep 1943)
- Supermarine Spitfire Mk.Vc (Aug 1942–Sep 1943)
- Supermarine Spitfire Mk.IX (Apr 1943–Aug 1943; Jun 1946–Dec 1946)
- Supermarine Spitfire Mk.VIII (Jul 1943–Dec 1946)
- Gloster Meteor F.3 (Jan 1947–May 1948)
- Gloster Meteor F.4 (May 1948–Oct 1950)
- Gloster Meteor F.8 (Oct 1950–Feb 1954)
- Canadair Sabre F.4 (Feb 1954–Apr 1956)
- Hawker Hunter F.4 (Apr 1956–Mar 1957)
- Hawker Hunter F.6 (Mar 1957–Apr 1963)
- English Electric Lightning F.2 (Apr 1963–July 1971)
- English Electric Lightning F.2A (Aug 1968–Mar 1977)
- McDonnell Douglas F-4M Phantom FGR.2 (Jan 1977–Jul 1991)
- British Aerospace Hawk T.1/T.1A (Sep 1992–Oct 1994)

== Aces ==
- Robert Stanford Tuck 27 enemy aircraft destroyed, two shared destroyed, six probably destroyed, six damaged and one shared damaged
- Donald Ernest Kingaby 21 kills plus two shared kills, six probable kills and 11 damaged - 14½ of his kills came against the Messerschmitt Bf 109
- Allan Wright 11 kills three shared kills, five probable kills and seven damaged
- Ronnie Fokes nine kills, four shared kills, two unconfirmed kills, three probables, one damaged and one shared damaged
- Brian Kingcome eight kills and 3 shared destroyed, one 1 shared unconfirmed, five probables, 13 damaged
- John Fraser Drummond eight kills, one shared kill, three probables and four damaged
- Tony Bartley eight kills with 92 squadron, 12 confirmed kills during WW2, plus one unconfirmed destroyed, five 'probables' and eight damaged
- Adolf Pietrasiak Polish Air Force (P.A.F.) 8 1/10 enemy aircraft destroyed, 2/5 damaged.

== Honours ==
In 1950 the Battle of Britain class steam locomotive No. 34081 was named "92 Squadron". This locomotive was saved from the scrapyard in 1976 and is owned by The Battle of Britain Locomotive Society and based at the East Lancashire Railway.

== See also ==
- List of RAF squadrons

== Bibliography ==
- Derry, Martin and Robinson, Neil. Flight Craft 11: English Electric Lightning. Pen & Sword, 2016. ISBN 978-1473890558
- Forrester, Larry and Wootton, Frank. Fly For Your Life: The Glorious Story Of Englands Greatest Air Ace Robert Stanford Tuck And His Deadly Spitfire. Bantam Books, 1956 (reprinted in 1978 by Bantam Books and by Cerebus in 2002 as Fly for your life: the story of Bob Stanford Tuck).
- Halley, James J. The Squadrons of the Royal Air Force & Commonwealth, 1918–1988. Tonbridge, Kent, UK: Air-Britain (Historians) Ltd., 1988. ISBN 0-85130-164-9.
- Jefford, C.G. RAF Squadrons, a Comprehensive Record of the Movement and Equipment of all RAF Squadrons and their Antecedents since 1912. Shrewsbury, Shropshire, UK: Airlife Publishing, 2001. ISBN 1-84037-141-2.
- Kingcombe, Brian, DSO, DFC & Bar. A Willingness to Die: Memories from Fighter Command. Tempus Publishing, 1992(reprinted 2007). ISBN 0-7524-4024-1
- Morris, Simon. A Cobra in the Sky The history of 92 Squadron 1975
- Rawlings, J.D.R. "Squadron Histories: No. 92". Air Pictorial, Vol. 23, No. 7. July 1961. pp. 207–208.
- Rawlings, John D.R. Fighter Squadrons of the RAF and their Aircraft. London: Macdonald and Jane's (Publishers) Ltd., 1969 (new edition 1976, reprinted 1978). ISBN 0-354-01028-X.
- Robinson, Anthony. RAF Fighter Squadrons in the Battle of Britain. London: Arms and Armour Press Ltd., 1987 (Reprinted in 1999 by Brockhampton Press, ISBN 1-86019-907-0.)
- Robinson, M. Best of the Few: 92 Squadron 1939–40. (Robinson 2001)
- Wellum, Geoffrey. First Light: The True Story of the Boy Who Became a Man in the War-Torn Skies Above Britain. London: Penguin Viking, 2002. ISBN 0-670-91248-4.
