= Ronnie Fokes =

Ronald Henry Fokes
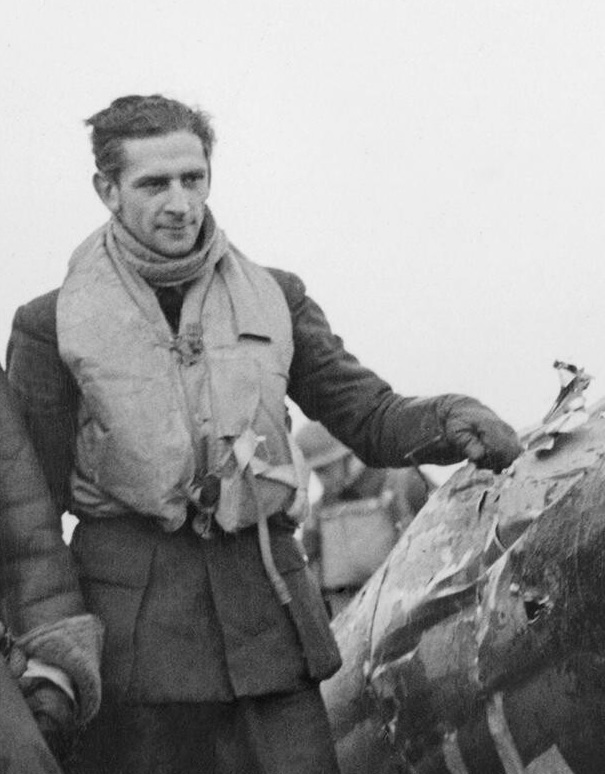
- Born: 5 December 1912; Upper Halliford, Surrey, England
- Died: 12 June 1944 (aged 31); Caen, German-occupied France
- Burial place: Banneville-la-Campagne War Cemetery
- Military career
- Allegiance: United Kingdom
- Branch: Royal Air Force
- Service years: 1937–1944
- Rank: Squadron Leader
- Nickname: Ronnie
- Service number: 88439
- Unit: No. 92 Squadron
- Commands: No. 257 Squadron
- Conflicts: Second World War: Battle of Britain; Italian Campaign; Channel Front; Western Allied invasion of France; Normandy Campaign †
- Awards: Distinguished Flying Cross; Distinguished Flying Medal

Ronald Henry Fokes, DFC, DFM (5 December 1912 – 12 June 1944) was a British flying ace who served with the Royal Air Force (RAF) during the Second World War. He is credited with having shot down at least thirteen aircraft.

From Upper Halliford, Fokes was training as a pilot in the Royal Air Force Volunteer Reserve when he was called up to serve in the RAF as a sergeant pilot on the outbreak of the Second World War. He flew Supermarine Spitfire fighters with No. 92 Squadron, achieving much success during the Battle of Britain. Awarded the Distinguished Flying Medal and commissioned as a pilot officer towards the end of 1940, he continued to serve with the squadron until rested from operations in May 1941. He spent six months as an instructor and a test pilot before returned to operational service with No. 156 Squadron and then No. 54 Squadron. From August 1942 to February 1943 he was a test pilot for the Gloster Aircraft Company, and was then posted to No. 193 Squadron. He was given command of No. 257 Squadron in July 1943 and he led this unit until he was killed on 12 June 1944, while on a sortie to Caen.

== Early life ==
Ronald Henry Fokes, known as Ronnie, was born on 5 December 1912 at Upper Halliford in Surrey, England. He went to Hampton Grammar School and once his education was completed, worked in the insurance industry. In April 1937, he joined the Royal Air Force Volunteer Reserve as an airman to train as a pilot. His flight instruction was at No. 5 Elementary and Reserve Flying Training School (E&RFTS) at Hanworth. In March 1939, he was given the opportunity to train full-time with the Royal Air Force (RAF), flying with No. 87 Squadron from late March to August. At that time he reverted to part-time training with the RAFVR, going to No. 10 E&RFTS at Yatesbury.

== Second World War ==
On the outbreak of the Second World War, Fokes was called up to serve with the RAF. After a period of time at the Initial Training wing at Bexhill, in January 1940, he was posted to No. 92 Squadron. This was based at Croydon and although equipped with the Bristol Blenheim operating as a heavy fighter, within two months of Fokes's arrival it started to re-equip with the Supermarine Spitfire fighter. In May, it was deemed operational on Spitfires and began to fly sorties to France as the British Expeditionary Force there withdrew to Dunkirk. On 2 June Fokes destroyed three Heinkel He 111 medium bombers over Dunkirk, although only one of these was confirmed.

=== Battle of Britain ===
After its operations to France, No. 92 Squadron relocated to Pembrey, in South Wales for a time, mostly carrying out convoy patrols. On 4 July, Fokes shared in the destruction of a He 111 about 30 miles (48 km) to the south of Filton. By early September the RAF was heavily engaged in the Battle of Britain and No. 92 Squadron was recalled to the south, to Biggin Hill, on 9 September. The next day, Fokes was one of two pilots that combined to destroy a Dornier Do 17 medium bomber to the southwest of Biggin Hill. In an engagement on 15 September, now known as Battle of Britain Day, he damaged a Do 17 near Maidstone. He probably shot down a Junkers Ju 88 medium bomber on 24 September, also in the vicinity of Maidstone and on the last day of the month probably destroyed a Messerschmitt Bf 109 fighter near Beachy Head.

On 15 October he destroyed a He 111 and a Bf 109 over the English Channel. Another Bf 109 was shot down over Ashford by Fokes later the same day. He destroyed a Bf 109 to the southeast of Tunbridge Wells on 26 October. On 9 November he shared in the destruction of a Ju 88 near Dungeness. He destroyed a Bf 109 over the Thames estuary of 15 November. The same day an award of the Distinguished Flying Medal (DFM) for Fokes in recognition of his successes over the previous weeks was announced. The citation for the DFM was published in The London Gazette and read:

In October, 1940, this airman was on patrol with his squadron at 30,000 feet, when a formation of more than twenty Messerschmitt 109s was sighted. Sergeant Fokes attacked one, and followed it down to the ground where it crashed. He has displayed great courage and tenacity and has personally destroyed at least six enemy aircraft.

— London Gazette, No. 34993, 15 November 1940

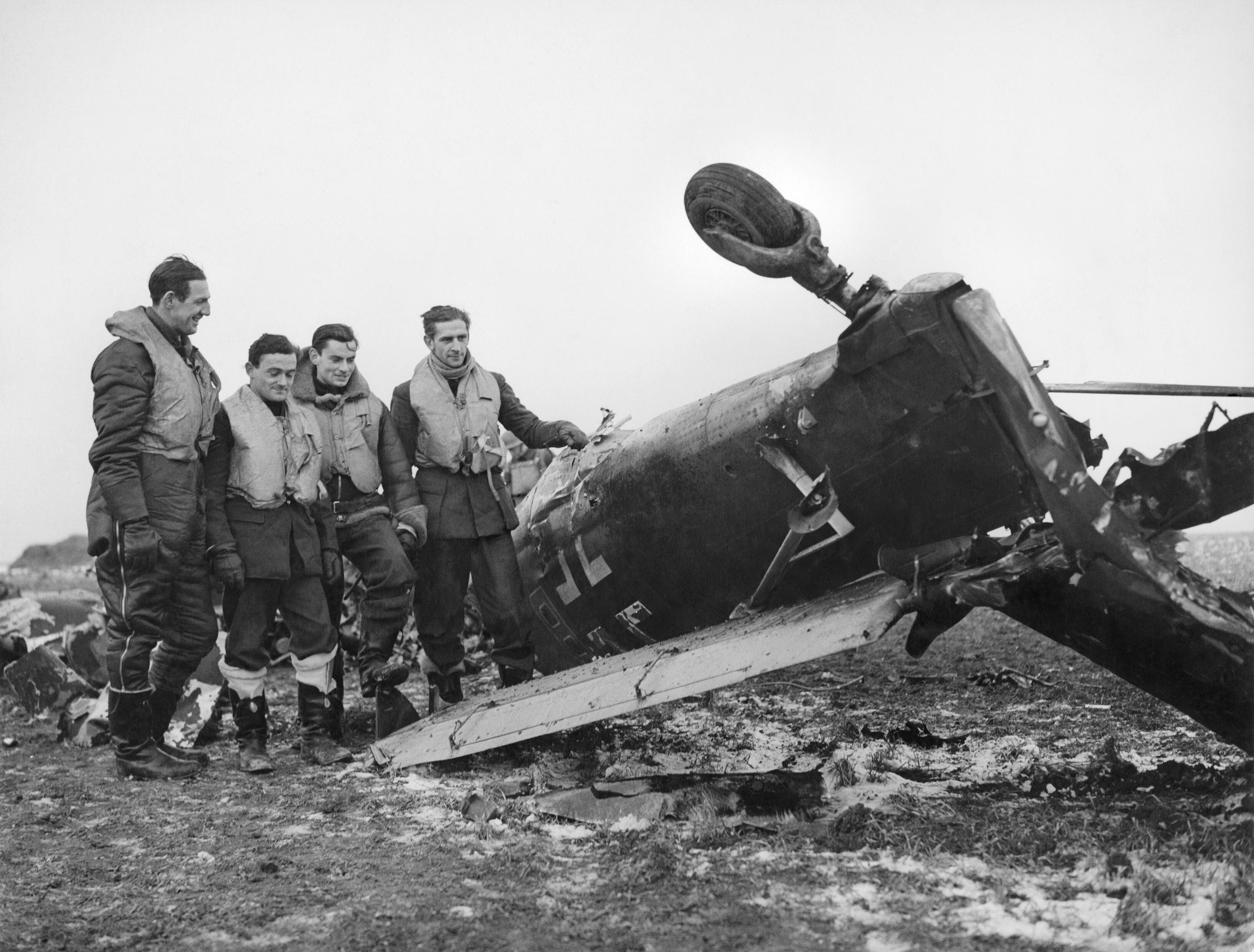
Fokes stands far right in this group of RAF pilots inspecting the wreckage of a Junkers Ju 87 dive bomber shot down near Manston

Two days after the announcement of his DFM, Fokes probably destroyed a Bf 109 over Eastbourne. He was commissioned as a pilot officer with effect from 29 November. He shot down a Bf 109 near Dover on 5 December and another near Dungeness on 21 December. On 23 January he shared in the damaging of what he claimed as a Do 17 near Manston, but this was actually a Messerschmitt Bf 110 heavy fighter which subsequently crashed in Zuydcoote in France. On 4 February he was one of four pilots that combined in the shooting down of a Junkers Ju 87 dive bomber, the wreckage of which crashed near Manston.

By this time No. 92 Squadron was re-equipping with the new Spitfire Mk Vb, and it soon started operations to the continent as part of Fighter Command's Circus offensive. On 26 April Fokes destroyed a Bf 109 to the north of Cap Gris-Nez.

=== Later war service ===
In May Fokes was posted to No. 53 Operational Training Unit (OTU) at Heston as an instructor and then to the Central Flying School at Upavon on an instructor's course. A spell at No. 61 OTU followed. In November Fokes was posted to the newly formed No. 154 Squadron as a flight commander. This was at Fowlmere and equipped with Spitfires. For the next several weeks, the squadron worked on becoming operational, which it did in February 1942, when it started carrying out patrols over the East coast.

In late March Fokes was posted away to join No. 56 Squadron. Since the previous September, the squadron has been working up on the new Hawker Typhoon fighter but had been plagued with various technical issues. It finally became operational from Manston in May, where it carried out interception duties. In August Fokes became a test pilot at the Gloster Aircraft Company, performing in this role until the start of March 1943 when he returned to operations with No. 193 Squadron. This was another relatively new squadron, stationed at Harrowbeer and training on Typhoons for a fighter/ground attack role. It started operations in May, looking to intercept Bf 109s fighter-bombers mounting sneak raids on the English coast, and then started carry out offensive sorties the following month, flying bomber escort missions to German-occupied Europe.

In July 1943, Fokes took command of No. 257 Squadron which, like his previous unit, operated Typhoons. Stationed at Warmwell, it was tasked with anti-shipping duties but at the start of 1944 it started carrying out fighter-bomber duties, attacking targets in northern France. Fokes was awarded the Distinguished Flying Cross in March; the published citation read:

This officer has completed a very large number of sorties during which he has shot down at least 10 enemy aircraft. He is a fine leader and has invariably pressed home his attacks with skill and resolution.

— London Gazette, No. 36418, 10 March 1944

The intensity of the squadron's operations increased into the spring and summer months ahead of the invasion of Normandy. Then, after D-Day, it carried out ground attack sorties. Fokes was due to end his tour just before the D-Day landings took place, but elected to remain with the squadron until after the invasion. On 12 June his aircraft was shot down over Caen, France, during a ground attack mission. Fokes bailed out, but was killed when he hit the ground before his parachute opened. He was buried at Soulangy, but when a Commonwealth War Grave Commission cemetery was established at Banneville-la-Campagne, his body was re-interred there. He is credited with the destruction of thirteen aircraft, four of which were shared with other pilots, two unconfirmed destroyed aircraft, and three probably destroyed. He is also credited with damaging two aircraft, one being shared.

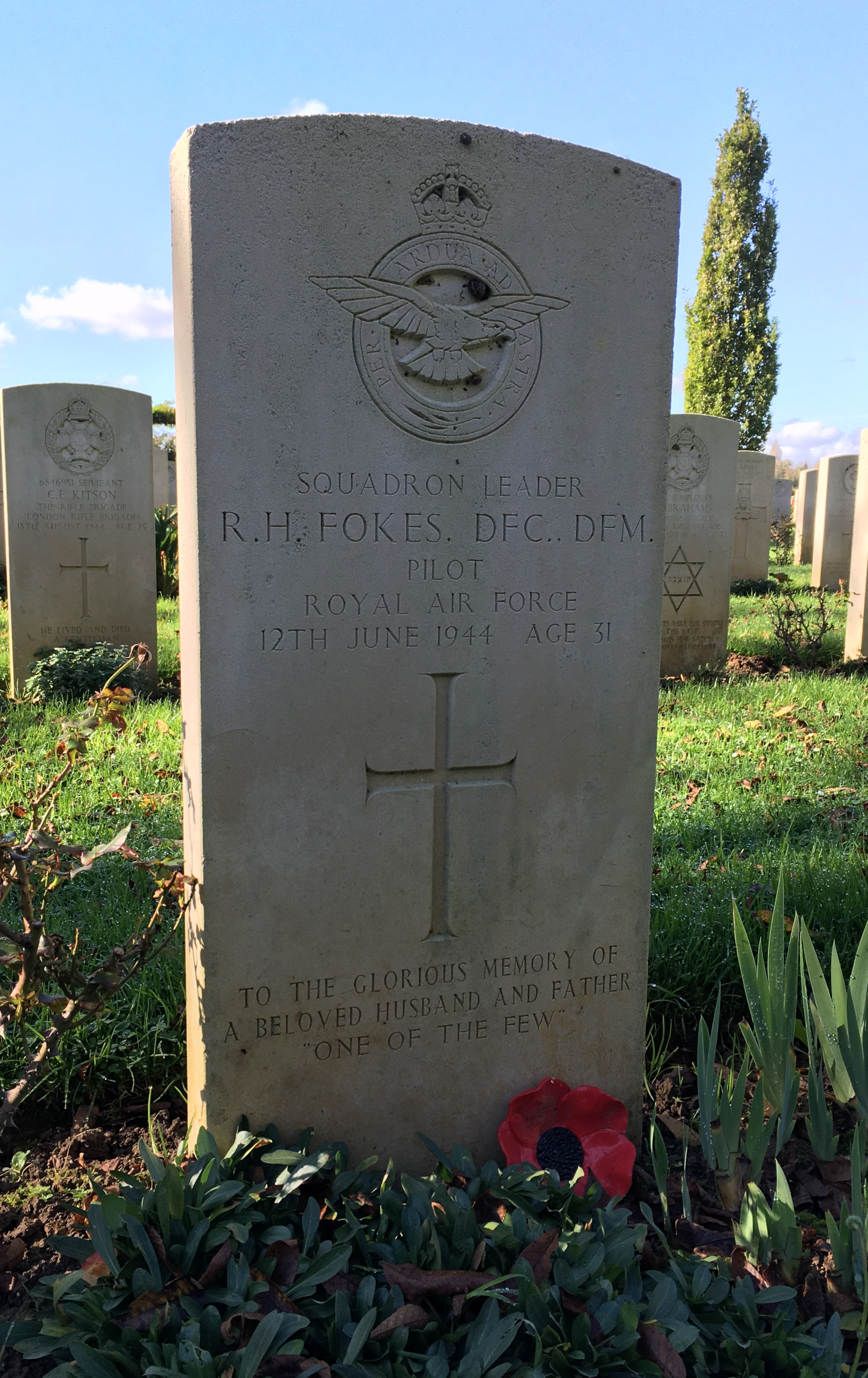
Fokes's grave at the Commonwealth War Graves Commission cemetery at Banneville-la-Campagne, France
