= Adolf Pietrasiak =

Polish World War II fighter ace

- Born: 17 November 1916; Kośmin, Poland
- Died: 29 November 1943 (aged 27); English Channel
- Military career
- Allegiance: Poland; France; United Kingdom
- Branch: Polish Air Force; French Air Force; Royal Air Force
- Service years: 1932–1943
- Rank: Podporucznik
- Service number: P-2093
- Units: Polish 122nd Fighter Escadrille; No. 303 Polish Fighter Squadron; No. 92 Squadron RAF; No. 308 Polish Fighter Squadron; No. 317 Polish Fighter Squadron
- Conflicts: Polish Defensive War; Second World War
- Awards: Virtuti Militari; Cross of Valour; Distinguished Flying Medal (United Kingdom)

Adolf Pietrasiak (17 November 1916 – 29 November 1943) was a Polish fighter ace of the Polish Air Force in the Second World War with 8 confirmed aerial victories and one shared.

== Biography ==
Adolf Pietrasiak was born in Kośmin near Puławy. In 1932 he entered the Air Force Non-Commissioned Officer's School for minors in Bydgoszcz. Four years later he was assigned to Polish 122nd Fighter Escadrille in Kraków.

During the Invasion of Poland, on 6 September 1939 Pietrasiak's PZL P.11 was damaged by his own side's anti-aircraft guns. On the morning of 18 September he crossed the border with Romania, then he came to France. He served in the Kosiński section in Bourges. On 5 June 1940, flying a Curtiss P-36 Hawk, Pietrasiak claimed three victories shared.

On 27 June 1940 he arrived in the United Kingdom and was posted to No. 303 Polish Fighter Squadron then to No. 92 Squadron RAF. In July 1941 he downed seven Bf 109. On 23 July he was transferred to No. 308 Polish Fighter Squadron. On 19 August he was shot down over France, landing by parachute he injured his leg. He came back to England via Spain and Gibraltar in November. From 24 August 1942 he flew in No. 317 Polish Fighter Squadron.

On 29 November 1943 Pietrasiak took off in a Spitfire and never came back. His plane probably crashed in the English Channel. His body was never found.

== Awards ==
Virtuti Militari, Silver Cross
Cross of Valour (Poland)
Distinguished Flying Medal
