= Evander Shapard =

- Born: 5 September 1893; Shelbyville, Tennessee, United States
- Died: 15 April 1940 (aged 46); Spalding, Georgia, USA
- Military career
- Allegiance: United States
- Branch: Royal Air Force (United Kingdom)
- Rank: Lieutenant
- Unit: Royal Air Force: No. 92 Squadron RAF
- Conflicts: World War I
- Awards: British Distinguished Flying Cross

Lieutenant Evander Shapard was a World War I flying ace from the United States serving in the Royal Air Force and credited with six aerial victories.

== Biography ==
The son of Emma Frierson (Lipscomb) and Evander Shapard, Sr. Evander Shapard, Jr., was born in Shelbyville, Tennessee. He attended Vanderbilt University and was a member of Beta Theta Pi fraternity. Shapard married Levie Reynolds on April 6, 1920, daughter of Mr. and Mrs. James P. Reynolds. In 1917, Shapard joined the Royal Air Force and was promoted to temporary 2nd Lieutenant (on probation) on 5 January 1918. Posted to 92 Squadron in 1918, he scored six victories flying the S.E.5a.

== See also ==
- List of World War I flying aces from the United States
