= Enquin-les-Mines =

Enquin-les-Mines Enken
- Delegated commune of Enquin-lez-Guinegatte
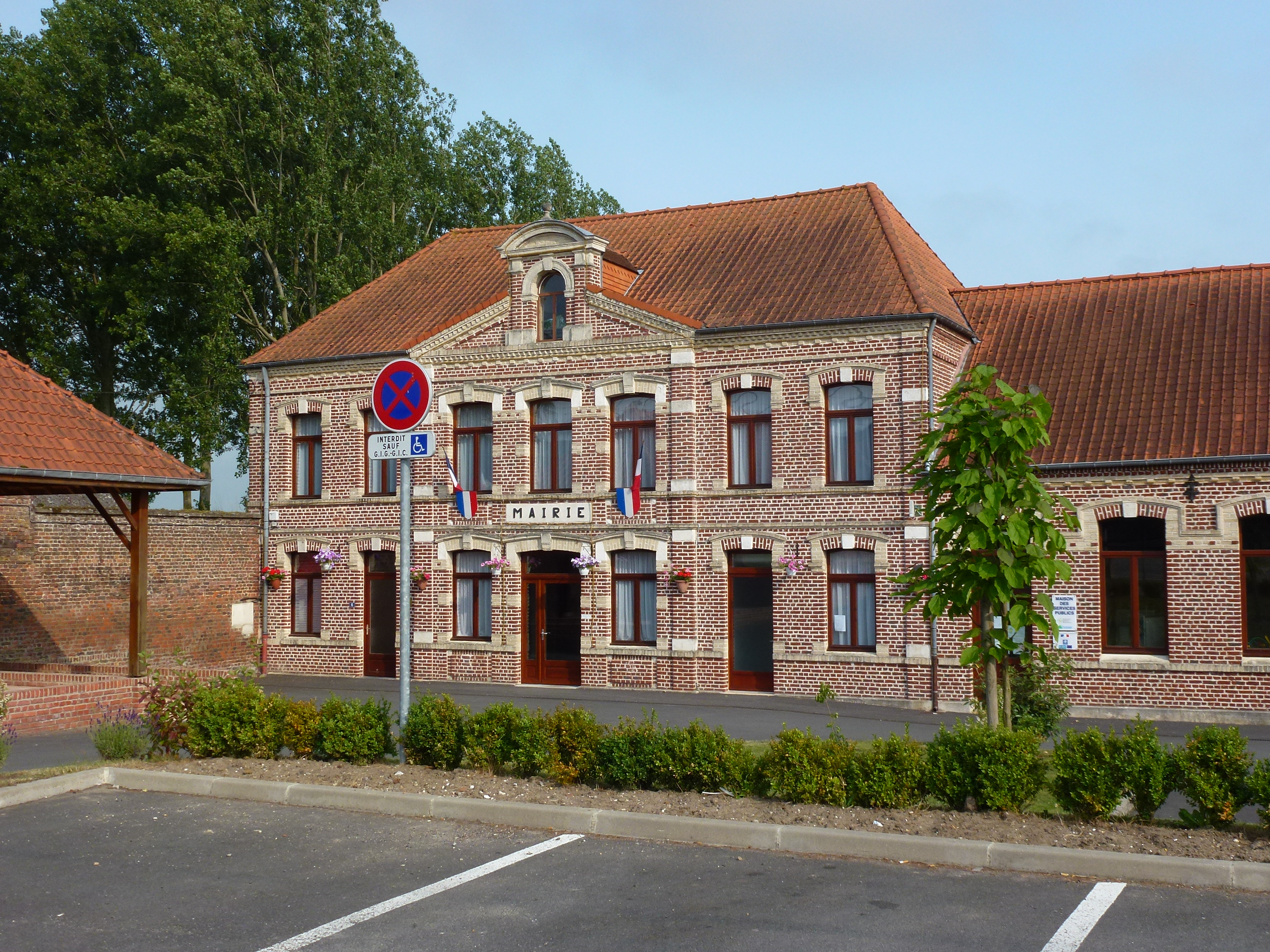
- Town hall

- Coat of arms
- Location of Enquin-les-Mines
- Location within France Location within Hauts-de-France
- Coordinates: 50°35′18″N 2°17′11″E
- Country: France
- Region: Hauts-de-France
- Department: Pas-de-Calais
- Arrondissement: Saint-Omer
- Canton: Fruges
- Commune: Enquin-lez-Guinegatte
- Area^{1}: 11.1 km^{2} (4.3 sq mi)
- Elevation: 84 m (276 ft)
- Highest elevation: 118 m (387 ft)
- Lowest elevation: 49 m (161 ft)
- Population (2022): 1,149
  - Density: 104/km^{2} (268/sq mi)
- Time zone: UTC+01:00 (CET)
  - Summer (DST): UTC+02:00 (CEST)
- Postal code: 62145
- ^{1} French Land Register data, which excludes lakes, ponds, glaciers > 1 km^{2} (0.386 sq mi or 247 acres) and river estuaries.

Enquin-les-Mines (French pronunciation: [ɑ̃kɛ̃ le min]; West Flemish: Enken; Picard: Inquin-les-Mines) is a town and former commune in the Pas-de-Calais department in the Hauts-de-France region of France. Since January 2017, it is a delegated commune of Enquin-lez-Guinegatte.

The inhabitants of the town of Enquin-les-Mines are known as Enquinois, Enquinoises in French.

The commune was surrounded by the municipalities of Erny-Saint-Julien, Estrée-Blanche and Enguinegatte. The commune merged with Enguinegatte on 1 January 2017 to form the commune nouvelle of Enquin-lez-Guinegatte.

== Geography ==
Enquin-les-Mines is a farming village situated 12 miles (19 km) southwest of Saint-Omer, by the banks of the small river Laquette.

== Population ==
Historical population
Year	Pop.	±% p.a.
1962	1,026	—
1968	944	−1.38%
1975	856	−1.39%
1982	825	−0.53%
1990	869	+0.65%
1999	917	+0.60%
2006	975	+0.88%
2022	1,149	+1.03%
Source: EHESS and INSEE

== See also ==
- Communes of the Pas-de-Calais department
