= First Light (Wellum book) =

2002 memoir by Geoffrey Wellum

First Light: The Story of the Boy Who Became a Man in the War-Torn Skies Above Britain
- Author: Geoffrey Wellum
- Language: English
- Subject: Memoir
- Genre: History
- Publisher: Viking Press
- Publication date: Jan 2002
- Media type: Softcover
- Pages: 352
- ISBN: 0-670-91248-4
- OCLC: 48416722

First Light: The Story of the Boy Who Became a Man in the War-Torn Skies Above Britain is a 2002 memoir by Geoffrey Wellum, a Royal Air Force fighter pilot in the Second World War.

== Synopsis ==
The book opens with Wellum's interview for the Royal Air Force and his training. It then shifts to his participation in the Battle of Britain and to his participation in Operation Pedestal, flying planes to Malta off an aircraft carrier. It then closes with him being grounded, recovering from sinusitis and then returning to duty as a test pilot.

== Adaptation ==
First Light was adapted as a drama documentary that premiered on 14 September 2010 on BBC 2 as part of the BBC's commemorations of the 70th anniversary of Battle of Britain, with Wellum himself narrating and the young Wellum played by Sam Heughan.
