= Thomas Stanley Horry =

Wing Commander Thomas Stanley Horry DFC; AFC
- Born: 21 May 1898; Boston, Lincolnshire, England
- Died: 15 January 1960 (aged 61); Harrogate, West Riding, Yorkshire, UK
- Military career
- Allegiance: United Kingdom
- Branch: Royal Air Force
- Rank: Wing Commander
- Unit: No. 92 Squadron RAF
- Awards: Distinguished Flying Cross Air Force Cross, General Service Cross

Squadron Leader Thomas Stanley Horry DFC AFC (21 May 1898 – 15 January 1960) was a First World War flying ace credited with eight aerial victories.

He was the son of William Horry of Rout Green, Boston, Lincolnshire. He attended Framlingham College and entered service with the Royal Flying Corp in 1916. Horry gained his Royal Aero Club Aviators' Certificate in a Beatty-Wright Biplane at the Beatty School, Cricklewood on 12 June 1917. Serving in France during the First World War, he was awarded the Distinguished Flying Cross while with 92 Squadron in 1918.

After the war he continued his service with the Royal Air Force in Iraq with No. 70 (Bomber) Squadron and he was awarded an Air Force Cross in the 1928 Birthday Honours. From there he was sent to Kurdistan and the Southern Desert and gained the General Service Medal with two clasps.

He was appointed to No. 22 Squadron based at RAF Martlesham Heath.

Lieutenant Horry became engaged in 1936 to Lola Tremlett. (Note: She was born Lola Erben in 1901 and had married Leonard Tremlett in 1923)

He was promoted to squadron leader in 1937 and in 1938 was sent to serve at RAF Seletar in Singapore.

In 1940 he rose to the rank of wing commander.

He died on 15 January 1960 at the Duchy House Nursing Home in Harrogate, West Riding of Yorkshire.
