= Mediterranean Air Command =

- Active: February 18 – December 10, 1943
- Allegiance: Allies of World War II
- Type: Major Command
- Engagements: North African campaign; Tunisian Campaign; Italian Campaign

The Mediterranean Air Command (MAC) was a World War II Allied air force command that was active in the Mediterranean and Middle East theatre of World War II between February 18 and December 10, 1943. MAC was under the command of Air Chief Marshal Sir Arthur Tedder, whose headquarters were next to those of the Supreme Allied Commander, General Dwight D. Eisenhower, in Algiers, Algeria, during the planning of the Allied campaigns in Tunisia, Pantelleria, Sicily, and the invasion of mainland Italy during the war.

== Formation ==
After Operation Torch, in November 1942, the U.S. Army 12th Air Force established bases in Morocco and Algeria. The establishment of the two bases made it necessary for the US Army Air Forces (USAAF) to coordinate operations with the Allied ground forces and the Royal Air Force (RAF), which had been fighting Axis forces (primarily in Egypt and Libya) for two years. Coordination and cooperation between the USAAF, the RAF, and Allied naval and ground forces were a major concern to British and American leaders at the Casablanca Conference. The flexible coordination of the RAF with the 8th Army during this period has been contrasted with the more rigid relationship between the Luftwaffe and German ground forces. As a result, effective February 18, 1943, Allied air forces were reorganized into the Mediterranean Air Command.

== Tactics ==
The successful air interdiction model of the RAF was developed by Tedder as Commander-in-Chief of Middle East Command and Air Vice Marshal Arthur Coningham as Air Officer Commanding Air H.Q., The Western Desert, in 1942.

One RAF tactic, the Tedder Carpet, consisted of successive squadrons of bombers dropping a rolling barrage of bombs, ahead of their advancing forces. This motivated the nickname of the 12th Bombardment Group as The Earthquake. Another close air support tactic involved the highly mobile leap-frogging of interspersed landing fields to facilitate the performance of 1) attack; 2) top cover; and 3) reserve (refueling) fighter and fighter-bomber squadrons.

== Organization ==
=== Commanders ===
To promote cooperation between the USAAF and RAF, a unit commander of one air force would be assigned a deputy commander from the other air force. A major exception to this convention existed in the MAC headquarters itself, where Tedder's Deputy Commander-in-Chief was Air Vice Marshal Philip Wigglesworth. However, the MAC chief of staff was American Brigadier General Howard A. Craig, who had been schooled in desert warfare army-air operations by both Tedder and General Bernard Montgomery. In keeping with the new convention, Spaatz's deputy in the Northwest African Air Forces (NAAF) was Air Vice Marshal James Robb, who handled NAAF operations.

=== Units ===
The primary forces used for cooperative strategic, naval, and close air support of ground forces by Tedder and Coningham in Egypt and Libya had consisted of:

- No 205 (Heavy Bomber) Group
- No 201 (Naval Co-operation) Group
- Air H.Q. The Western Desert

The Northwest African Air Forces (NAAF) was the principal sub-command of MAC, and its structure was based on the successful air interdiction model of the RAF. In keeping with the RAF model, planners at the Casablanca Conference vested NAAF with three major combat commands:

- Northwest African Strategic Air Force – under Major General James Doolittle
- Northwest African Coastal Air Force – under Air Vice Marshal Hugh Lloyd.
- Northwest African Tactical Air Force – under Acting Air Marshal Sir Arthur Coningham.

Air interdiction, using strategic, coastal, and tactical air forces, was further implemented, practiced, and developed by the NAAF throughout the Tunisian, Sicilian, and Italian campaigns.

Lewis Brereton's U.S. 9th Air Force was initially assigned to Sir Sholto Douglas' RAF Middle East Command, with some units being assigned to other MAC commands—such as the 57th and 79th Fighter Groups, to No. 211 (Offensive Fighter) Group in the Northwest African Tactical Air Force's western Desert Air Force, under Air Vice Marshal Harry Broadhurst; the 324th Fighter Group, to XII Air Support Command, under Major General Edwin House; and the 12th and 340th Bombardment groups, to the Tactical Bomber Force, under Air Commodore Laurence Sinclair.

The US 12th Air Force, which had been the largest air force ever assembled following its inception several months earlier, ceased to exist in the new MAC organization. The 12th simply disappeared as its groups were distributed among the various NAAF commands. The sole remaining reference to the 12th Air Force among the higher commands was House's XII Air Support Command, which—along with Broadhurst's Western Desert Air Force, Sinclair's Tactical Bomber Force, and Air Commodore Sir Kenneth Cross' No. 242 Group RAF—became a subordinate command of Coningham's NATAF. Before the invasion of Sicily (Operation Husky), in July 1943, No.242 Group became part of Lloyd's NACAF.

== Disbandment ==
The Mediterranean Air Command was disbanded on December 10, 1943, and was succeeded by the Mediterranean Allied Air Forces (MAAF).

== See also ==
- List of Royal Air Force commands
