= Tactical air force =

British term for WWII plane formation

The term Tactical Air Force was used by the air forces of the British Commonwealth during the later stages of World War II, for formations of more than one fighter group. A tactical air force was intended to achieve air supremacy and perform ground attack missions.

Unlike the numbered air forces of the United States Army Air Forces (USAAF), the Tactical Air Forces did not include strategic bombing/heavy bomber capability. The USAAF situation changed in late 1943 when the Twelfth Air Force transferred its heavy bombers to the newly formed Fifteenth Air Force. Later, when the Allied air forces in the MTO were reorganized into the Mediterranean Allied Air Forces (MAAF), the US 12th Air Force and the RAF Desert Air Force became part of the Mediterranean Allied Tactical Air Force and the US 15th Air Force and No. 205 Group RAF became part of the Mediterranean Allied Strategic Air Force. A Mediterranean Allied Coastal Air Force was also part of MAAF.

Operating strategic, tactical, and coastal air forces together throughout the latter stages of the Second World War was based on the successful practice primarily of Air Chief Marshal Sir Arthur Tedder and Air Vice Marshal Arthur Coningham during the Western Desert Campaign of WWII. This original 'tri-force' consisted of No. 205 (Heavy Bomber) Group, Air Headquarters Western Desert, and No. 201 (Naval Cooperation) Group as the strategic, tactical, and coastal components, respectively. Coningham commanded Air Headquarters Western Desert. To support Allied ground forces, he and Tedder developed some of the key features of close air support still practiced in the 21st century.

The first tactical air force to be so named was the RAF Second Tactical Air Force, which was inaugurated within RAF Fighter Command on June 1, 1943, with the title "tactical air force" superseding the original title of "expeditionary air force".

The four tactical air forces were:

- Australian First Tactical Air Force
- Desert Air Force (later known as the First Tactical Air Force) - North Africa and later Italy
- RAF Second Tactical Air Force - Northern Europe
- RAF Third Tactical Air Force - South Asia

== US First Tactical Air Force in WWII ==
Also there was a U.S./French TAF, the First Tactical Air Force (Provisional), supporting the Franco-American 6th Army Group, consisting of U.S. Seventh Army and the French 1er Corps Aerien Francais. (Zaloga, Nordwind) 1 TAF (P) became operational early in November 1944 with Major General Ralph Royce in command. Its major components included the XII Tactical Air Command, which oversaw five P-47 Thunderbolt groups previously assigned to the Twelfth and Ninth Air Forces through the 64th Fighter Wing under the command of Col. Nelson P. Jackson. Additionally, the First French Air Corps (FFAC) contributed three P-47 groups, while four B-26 Marauder groups—two from the Twelfth Air Force and two from FFAC's II Brigade de Bombardment—were placed under the command of the 42nd Bomb Wing. The Western French Air Forces (WFAF) also played a role within the formation. The 1er CAF was formed on 1 December 1944.
