= No. 242 Group RAF =

Former Royal Air Force operations group

No. 242 Group
- Active: 24 August 1942 – 14 September 1944
- Country: United Kingdom
- Branch: Royal Air Force
- Part of: Northwest African Tactical Air Force; Northwest African Coastal Air Force
- Engagements: World War II • Operation Husky

No. 242 Group was a group of the British Royal Air Force (RAF) formed on 24 August 1942. Its first commander was Air Commodore George Lawson.

== History ==
Air Commodore Kenneth Cross took over command on 22 February 1943 when the group was a sub-command of the Northwest African Tactical Air Force (NATAF) under Acting Air Marshal Sir Arthur Coningham. NATAF itself had just become one of the three major combat commands of the Northwest African Air Forces (NAAF) as a result of the major Allied air force reorganization that occurred at the Casablanca Conference in January 1943. At Casablanca, Air Chief Marshal Sir Arthur Tedder persuaded American President Franklin D. Roosevelt, British Prime Minister Winston Churchill, and their staffs to establish an air force command structure based on the previously successful coordination of No. 205 (Heavy Bomber) Group, No. 201 (Naval Co-operation) Group, and AHQ Western Desert during the North African Campaign of 1942, primarily in Egypt and Libya.

The Casablanca planners saw merit in Tedder's plan and established the Mediterranean Air Command (MAC) with Tedder as Air Commander-in-Chief of the Allied air forces in the North African and Mediterranean Theater of Operations (MTO). NAAF under the command of Lieutenant General Carl Spaatz became the major sub-command of MAC and based on Tedder's tri-force model, was invested with three major sub-commands:

- Northwest African Strategic Air Force (NASAF) under Major General Jimmy Doolittle
- Northwest African Coastal Air Force (NACAF) under Air Vice Marshal Sir Hugh Lloyd and
- Northwest African Tactical Air Force (NATAF) under Acting Air Marshal Sir Arthur Coningham.

The new unified tri-force command structure was implemented and practiced during the Tunisian, Pantellerian, Sicilian, and Italian campaigns. The intended successful coordination of these tri-forces was immediately put into practice when Spaatz placed most of the strategic bombers at Coningham's disposal during a critical period of the Tunisian campaign at the end of February and the beginning of March 1943.

While the subordinate commands of NASAF, NACAF, and NATAF were fixed and permanent throughout most of 1943, No. 242 Group was a major exception to this rigidity. It was the largest air force unit that was assigned to two different tri-forces: NATAF and NACAF. This unique history imparts a certain degree of flexibility, versatility, and importance to the group. During the same critical period of the Tunisian campaign mentioned above, No. 242 Group flew over 1,000 offensive sorties in just five days against ground targets as part of Coningham's NATAF.

Prior to the Allied invasion of Sicily (Operation Husky), No. 242 Group was transferred from NATAF to NACAF. At this time, the group consisted of the units indicated in the table below.

=== Order of Battle, 10 July 1943 ===
No. 242 Group
Air Commodore Kenneth Cross,
Headquarters at La Marsa, Tunisia.

No. 323 Wing	No. 328 Wing
No. 73 Squadron, Spitfire	No. 14 Squadron, B-26 Marauder
No. 255 Squadron, Beaufighter	No. 39 Squadron, Beaufort
No. II/5 Escadre (French), P-40	No. 47 Squadron, Beaufort
No. II/7 Escadre (French), Spitfire	No. 52 Squadron, Baltimore
No. 283 Squadron (ASR), Walrus	No. 144 Squadron, Beaufighter
No. 284 Squadron (ASR), Walrus	No. 221 Squadron (Det.), Wellington
	No. 458 Squadron RAAF, Wellington

Notes:
ASR=Air Sea Rescue; RAAF=Royal Australian Air Force.

== MACAF ==
When MAC was disbanded on 10 December 1943 and the Allied air forces in the MTO were again reorganized, No. 242 Group was assigned to the Mediterranean Allied Coastal Air Force also commanded by Lloyd. Air Commodore G. Harcourt-Smith took over command of No. 242 Group on 24 February 1944 until the group was disbanded on 14 September 1944.
