= No. 201 Group RAF =

Former Royal Air Force operations group

No. 201 Group
- Ensign of the Royal Air Force
- Active: 18 September 1939 – 1 February 1944
- Country: United Kingdom
- Branch: Royal Air Force
- Type: Royal Air Force group
- Part of: RAF Middle East Command

No. 201 (General Reconnaissance) Group was a group of the Royal Air Force during the Second World War.

== History ==
No. 201 Group RAF was formed on 18 September 1939 from General Reconnaissance Group, Middle East of the Royal Air Force (RAF). The group was initially commanded by Group Captain H.W.G. Penderel. On 11 May 1940, Group Captain G. M. Bryer assumed command, followed by Air Vice Marshal Leonard Slatter in July 1941. On 3 October 1941, the group was renamed No. 201 (Naval Co-operation) Group and Air Vice Marshal Hugh Lloyd, previously Air Officer Commanding (AOC) of Air Headquarters, Malta, took over No. 201 (Naval Co-operation) Group in mid-July 1942.

During the North African Campaign in 1942, the successful coordination of No. 201 (Naval Co-operation) Group under Slatter and Lloyd with No. 205 (Heavy Bomber) Group under Air Commodores Lachlan L. MacLean and Alan P. Ritchie, and Air Headquarters (H.Q.) Western Desert under Air Vice Marshal Arthur Coningham, provided the practical model upon which British Prime Minister Winston Churchill, American President Franklin D. Roosevelt, and their staffs reorganized the Allied air forces in the North African and Mediterranean Theater of Operations (MTO) at the Casablanca Conference in January 1943. The result of this reorganization was the Mediterranean Air Command commanded by Air Chief Marshal Sir Arthur Tedder and its major sub-command, the Northwest African Air Forces (NAAF) under Lieutenant General Carl Spaatz, was structured according to the tri-force model.

The air interdiction model consisting of coastal, strategic, and tactical air forces was presented to the Casablanca planners by Tedder who along with primarily Lloyd, Ritchie, and especially Coningham, implemented and developed the model during the successful campaigns in Egypt and Libya.

No. 201 Group, as the coastal component of the original tri-force, contributed significantly to the organization of the Northwest African Air Forces established on 18 February 1943, Mediterranean Allied Air Forces (MAAF) in December 1943, Allied Expeditionary Air Forces (AEAF) of the Normandy Campaign, and even today's air forces.

Throughout this important period of World War II during which air interdiction was practiced and developed, Tedder was always at the forefront as Air Commander-in-Chief of RAF Middle East Command, Mediterranean Air Command (MAC), Mediterranean Allied Air Forces, and as General Dwight D. Eisenhower's Deputy Supreme Allied Commander for planning the air operations for D-Day Normandy.

Ironically, in the MAC organization following the Casablanca Conference, No. 201 Group was not part of the Northwest African Coastal Air Force (NACAF), but remained in RAF Middle East Command under its new commander, Air Chief Marshal Sir Sholto Douglas. On 5 March 1943, Air Vice Marshal Thomas Langsford-Sainsbury took over command of No. 201 Group. Appropriately, 201 group's previous commander during the campaigns in Egypt and Libya, Hugh Lloyd, took command of the coastal component (NACAF), which along with the Northwest African Strategic Air Force (NASAF) and the Northwest African Tactical Air Force (NATAF), formed the complete tri-force of NAAF.

No. 201 (Naval Co-operation) Group (Air Vice Marshal Thomas Langford-Sainsbury) Order of Battle, 10 July 1943
| No. 235 Wing | No. 238 Wing | No. 245 Wing | No. 247 Wing |
|---|---|---|---|
| 13th Light Bomber Squadron, RHAF, Bristol Blenheim | No. 16 Squadron SAAF, Bristol Beaufort | No. 15 Squadron SAAF, Bristol Blenheim/Martin Baltimore | No. 38 Squadron RAF, Vickers Wellington |
| No. 227 Squadron RAF Det., Bristol Beaufighter | No. 227 Squadron RAF Det., Bristol Beaufighter | No. 38 Squadron RAF Det., Vickers Wellington | No. 203 Squadron RAF, Martin Baltimore |
| No. 454 Squadron RAAF, Martin Baltimore | No. 603 Squadron RAF, Bristol Beaufighter | No. 1 General Reconnaissance Unit; Vickers Wellington | No. 227 Squadron RAF, Bristol Beaufighter |
| No. 459 Squadron RAAF, Lockheed Hudson | No. 815 Squadron (FAA) Det., Fairey Swordfish | | No. 252 Squadron RAF, Bristol Beaufighter |
| No. 815 Squadron (FAA), Fairey Swordfish | | No Wing Assignment: No. 701 Squadron (FAA), Supermarine Walrus | |

Notes:
RAF=Royal Air Force; RAAF=Royal Australian Air Force; SAAF=South African Air Force; FAA=Fleet Air Arm (Royal Navy); Det.=Detachment

On 1 February 1944 No. 201 group was absorbed into Air Defences Eastern Mediterranean.
