= Mediterranean Allied Air Forces =

Mediterranean Allied Air Forces (MAAF)
- Active: December 1943 – 1945
- Country: Allies (United States; United Kingdom; Canada; South Africa; Australia; France; Poland; Greece; Rhodesia; Italy (Co-Belligerent); Brazilian Expeditionary Force.
- Role: Unified command for Allied Air Forces in Mediterranean
- Engagements: Italian Campaign (Battle of Anzio, Rome-Arno, North Apennines, Po Valley), Operation Dragoon

Insignia
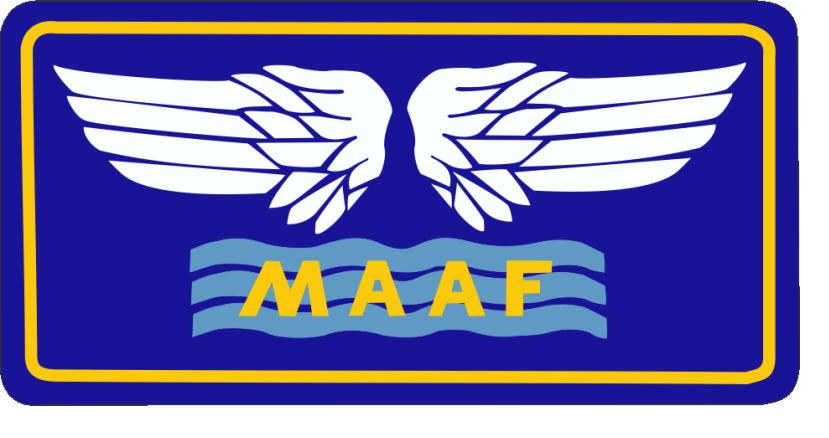
- Mediterranean Allied Air Forces Shoulder Sleeve Insigne. Approved 14 August 1944.

Mediterranean Allied Air Forces (MAAF) was the major Allied air force command in the Mediterranean theater from mid-December 1943 until the end of the Second World War.

Under the leadership of the British Royal Air Force and U.S. Army Air Forces, it had units from a wide range of allies, including the Free French Air Force, Hellenic Air Force, Italian Co-Belligerent Air Force, and the 1st Brazilian Fighter Squadron, which fought as part of the USAAF 350th Fighter Group. The Brazilian Air Force squadron also assisted with artillery spotting for Brazilian ground forces.

== Formation ==
The Mediterranean Allied Air Forces (MAAF) became the official Allied air force command organization in the Mediterranean theatre after the previous Mediterranean Air Command (MAC) was disbanded on 10 December 1943. Initially, Air Chief Marshal Sir Arthur Tedder who had commanded MAC, was retained as Air Commander-in-Chief of MAAF but in mid-January 1944, Lieutenant General Ira Eaker took over command of MAAF when Dwight D. Eisenhower chose Tedder as his Deputy Supreme Allied Commander to plan the air operations for the Normandy Landings. In March 1945, Lieutenant General John K. Cannon assumed command of MAAF.

Northwest African Air Forces had been the largest and major sub-command of MAC. It had a tri-force on the original RAF model (see No. 205 Group, No. 201 Group, and Air Headquarters Western Desert):

- Northwest African Strategic Air Force (NASAF) under Major General James Doolittle
- Northwest African Coastal Air Force (NACAF) under Air Vice-Marshal Hugh Lloyd
- Northwest African Tactical Air Force (NATAF) under Air Vice-Marshal Sir Arthur Coningham.

== Organization of the MAAF ==
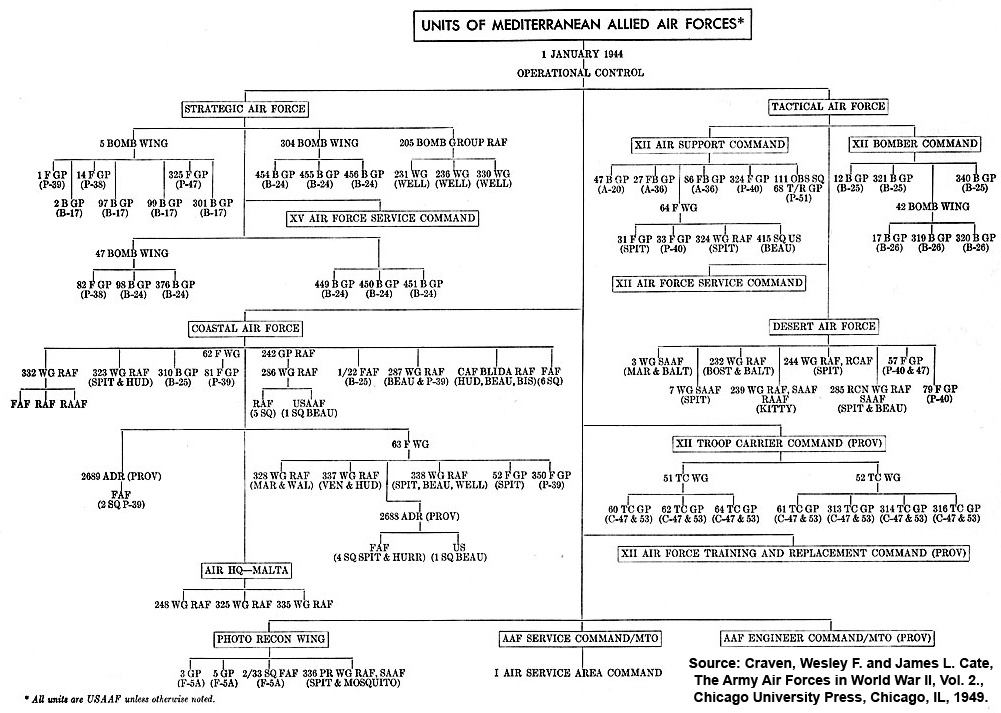
Units and Organization of the Mediterranean Allied Air Forces in January 1944.

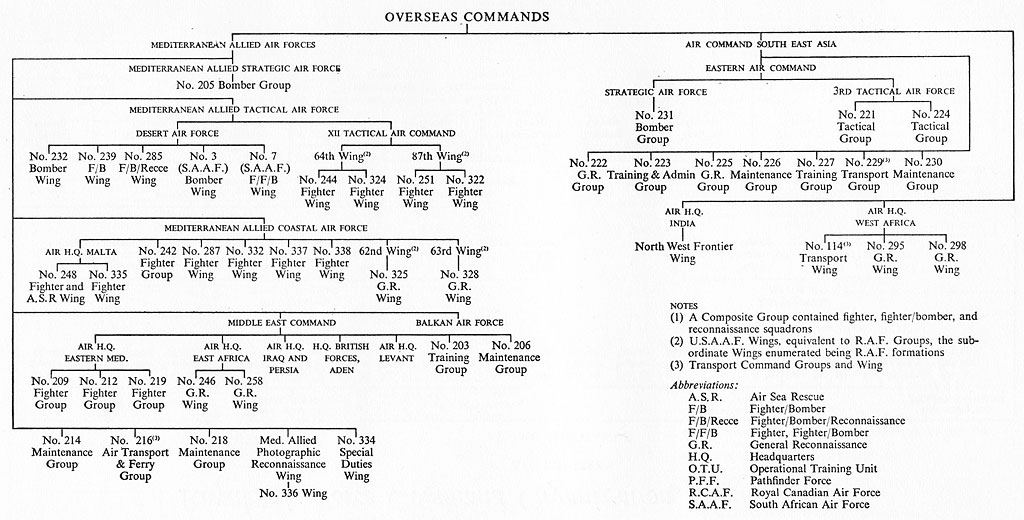
RAF units and organization in the Mediterranean Allied Air Forces in June 1944.

In keeping with the previous Allied convention established at the Casablanca Conference of naming commanders from one air force [United States Army Air Force (USAAF) or Royal Air Force (RAF)] and their deputies from the other air force, Eaker's Deputy Air Commander-in-Chief of MAAF became Air Marshal Sir John Slessor on 20 January 1944. Slessor, who also was named Commander-in-Chief of RAF Mediterranean and Middle East (previously AHQ Malta, a major sub-command of the disbanded MAC), had been the commander of RAF Coastal Command which was taken over by Air Chief Marshal Sir Sholto Douglas, the previous commander of RAF Middle East Command, another major sub-command of the disbanded MAC.

MAAF retained the original RAF and later Northwest African Air Forces "tri-force" model. It retained a long-range "strategic" bomber force, a "coastal" anti-shipping force, and a "tactical" close air support force. Accordingly, the three major combat commands of MAAF were:

- Mediterranean Allied Strategic Air Force (MASAF) under Major General Nathan Twining
- Mediterranean Allied Coastal Air Force (MACAF) under Air Vice-Marshal Hugh Lloyd
- Mediterranean Allied Tactical Air Force (MATAF) under Major General John K. Cannon. (Note: the "Allied" was not added until February 1943)

Air Vice-Marshal Hugh Lloyd was commander of NACAF and he stayed on as commander of MACAF. Doolittle of NASAF who temporarily commanded the new 15th Air Force before going to England to command the 8th Air Force, was replaced by Twining for the new MASAF. Coningham of NATAF who assumed command of Second Tactical Air Force, was replaced by Cannon of the new MATAF. Cannon also commanded the 12th Air Force which under the new MAAF organization was much more recognizable than it had been under the previous MAC/NAAF organization. When the 12th Air Force transferred all of its heavy bomb groups and its Martin B-26 Marauder medium bomb groups to the 15th Air Force, the 12th became strictly a tactical air force and the 15th became a strategic air force (1 November 1943). Twining commanded both MASAF and the 15th Air Force just as Cannon commanded both MATAF and the 12th Air Force. This helped to provide the unified command structure that was a major goal of the reorganization.

Lieutenant General Carl Spaatz, the previous NAAF, 12th Air Force, and 8th Air Force commander, took over the new United States Strategic Air Forces (USSTAF) consisting of Doolittle's 8th Air Force and Twining's 15th Air Force. This allowed Spaatz to borrow the 15th in Italy for long-range strategic bombing of European targets when inclement weather in England prevented the 8th from flying missions. Under this scenario, some heavy bombers took off from Italy, bombed German targets, and landed in England. This became known as Shuttle bombing. Similarly, some flew the opposite route. Overnight stops in Russia were also made by some of the long-range bombers of the 8th and 15th Air Forces.

AVM John Whitford replaced Lloyd in November 1944. Sir Guy Garrod replaced Slessor in early 1945.

Northwest African Coastal Air Force (NACAF) was established at Algiers, Algeria in early 1943. Within the year, on 10 December 1943 it was renamed the Mediterranean Allied Coastal Air Force. MACAF moved its main headquarters to Caserta, Italy, south of Rome, in early 1944 as operations shifted to the Italian mainland. It was renamed Mediterranean Coastal Air Forces on 1 August 1945, remaining stationed at Caserta.

== Effectiveness ==
With the defeat of Germany and the end of World War II in Europe, Headquarters, MAAF, Intelligence Section (United States) saw an opportunity to learn first-hand how effective the Allied air war was from the enemy's perspective. A series of interviews with high-ranking German officers resulted in the July 1945 compilation of the MAAF Air Surrender Documents.

General Heinrich von Vietinghoff, who at various times commanded German Tenth Army or Army Group C and was the Commander in Italy at the end of the war, was particularly impressed by the effectiveness of the Allied fighter-bombers:

- "The ceaseless use of fighter-bombers succeeded in paralyzing all day-time movement..."
- "The fighter-bomber pilots had a genuinely damaging effect."
- "Even the tanks could move only at night because of the employment of fighter-bombers."
- "The effectiveness of the fighter-bombers lay in that their presence alone over the battlefield paralyzed every movement."

Regarding air attacks on railroads, General von Vietinghoff stated the following:

"Rail traffic was struck in the most protracted fashion by the destruction of bridges. Restoration of bridges required much time; the larger bridges could not be repaired. As improvisation, many bridge sites were detoured or the supplies were reloaded. With the increasing intensity of the air attacks, especially on the stretch of the Brenner, the damaged sections were so great and so numerous that this stretch, despite the best of repair organization and the employment of the most powerful rebuilding effort, became ever worse and was only ever locally and temporarily usable. A few bad weather days, in which the Allied Air Force could not have flown, would often have sufficed to bring the traffic again to its peak. Only in February and March (1945) was it again possible to travel by rail through the Brenner to Bologna."

When asked if Allied air power was chiefly responsible for Germany's defeat in this war, each of the German officers below gave his own answer:

- Colonel General Heinrich von Vietinghoff, Supreme Commander Southwest, "Yes..."
- General Karl Wolff, SS Obergruppenfuehrer and General of the Waffen SS, "Yes..."
- General Joachim Lemelsen, Commanding General 14th Army, "Considered as a part of the general material superiority of the Allies, the strength of the Allied Air Force was of first importance - especially during the last year in Italy..."
- General Kurt Jahn, Commanding General of Lombardy Command, "They were of great, but not decisive importance."
- Major General von Schellwitz, Commanding General 305th Division, "Yes..."
- Lt. General Boehlke, Commanding General 334th Division, "The Allied Air Forces have played large part in the defeat of Germany..."

== Dissolution ==
With the end of the war in Europe the MAAF was dissolved. The RAF components reformed as new British commands. The MACAF became the RAF's Mediterranean Coastal Air Force and then AHQ Italy. The MASAF was disbanded in August 1945; the MATAF in July 1945.

Lawrence Darvall was Air Officer Commanding, Air Headquarters Italy from June 1946 before he moved on to take command of No. 3 Group RAF in March 1947. AHQ Italy was closed down at Udine in October 1947 after its seven fighter squadrons (72, No. 87 Squadron RAF, No. 92 Squadron RAF, No. 111 Squadron RAF, No. 112 Squadron RAF, 250, 253) and two other squadrons (225 and No. 654 Squadron RAF, an air observation post unit) had mostly disbanded.

- No. 72 Squadron disbanded at Zeltweg in Austria on 30 December 1946.
- No. 87 Squadron disbanded at Tissano on 30 December 1946.
- No. 92 Squadron RAF disbanded at Zeltweg in Austria on 30 December 1946.
- No. 112 Squadron disbanded at Treviso on 30 December 1946
- No. 250 Squadron disbanded on 30 December 1946 at Treviso, while it was flying Mustangs. Another source on the squadron WP page says it remained until 2 January 1947.
- No. 225 Squadron disbanded in Italy on 7 January 1947, while it was flying Spitfires.
- No. 253 Squadron was disbanded at Treviso on 16 May 1947.
- Returning from Austria, No. 111 Squadron disbanded in Italy on 12 May 1947.
- No. 654 Squadron disbanded at Campoformido on 24 June 1947.

AHQ Italy Communications Squadron was formed on 10 November 1945 at Marcianise near Caserta, and disbanded there on 15 August 1946. Immediately afterwards an AHQ Italy Communications Flight was established at Udine, until it disbanded on 27 September 1947.

== See also ==
- List of Royal Air Force commands

== Notes ==
Notes
