= Arthur Coningham =

Arthur Coningham may refer to:

- Arthur Coningham (cricketer) (1863–1939), cricketer, and father of:
- Arthur Coningham (RAF officer) (1895–1948), New Zealander, senior officer of the Royal Air Force
