= No. 683 Squadron RAF =

WW2 British RAF photo-recon unit

- Active: 8 Feb 1943 – 21 Sep 1945; 1 Aug 1950 – 30 Nov 1953
- Country: United Kingdom
- Branch: Royal Air Force
- Role: photo-reconnaissance squadron
- Part of: AHQ Malta, Mediterranean Air Command; No. 214 Group RAF, Mediterranean Air Command; RAF Middle East Air Force
- Mottos: Latin: Nihil Nos Latet (Translation: "Nothing remains concealed")

Insignia
- Squadron Badge heraldry: In front of a mullet of six points, a telescope in bend
- Squadron Codes: No code(s) are known to have been carried by this squadron

No. 683 Squadron RAF was a photo-reconnaissance squadron of the Royal Air Force during the Second World War and from August 1950 to November 1953.

== History ==
=== Formation and World War II ===
683 squadron was formed out of 'B' Flight of No. 69 Squadron on 8 February 1943 at RAF Luqa on Malta, as a photo-reconnaissance squadron operating the Spitfire fighter in the photo-reconnaissance role. The squadron added the Mosquito Mk.VI to its strength in May 1943, but they were only operated for a month. The squadron was involved in photo-reconnaissance mission over Sicily and Italy and later over Yugoslavia. The squadron moved to San Severo in Italy and continued in support of the US 5th Army. As the war continued it was involved in both tactical and strategic reconnaissance, and was involved survey flight across southern Europe. In September 1944, the squadron re-equipped with Spitfire PR.XIX photo-reconnaissance aircraft. Detachments from the squadron were based at a wide range of bases all across the Italian theatre of operations, with the squadron finally disbanding on 22 September 1945 at San Severo, Italy.

=== Post war ===
The squadron was re-formed on 1 November 1950 at RAF Fayid, Egypt with the Avro Lancaster PR.1 and the Vickers Valetta C.1. It was tasked with the survey and mapping of Arabia and East Africa. In January 1952 the squadron moved to RAF Khormaksar, Aden to cover both Aden and Somaliland. Another move to RAF Habbaniya, Iraq allowed the squadron to survey and map the Persian Gulf. With the survey and mapping role completed the squadron was disbanded at Habbaniya on 30 November 1953.

== Aircraft operated ==
Aircraft operated by no. 683 Squadron RAF, data from
From	To	Aircraft	Variant
February 1943	July 1943	Supermarine Spitfire	PR.Mk.IV
February 1943	March 1943	Supermarine Spitfire	PR.Mk.IX
April 1943	September 1945	Supermarine Spitfire	PR.XI
May 1943	June 1943	de Havilland Mosquito	PR.Mks.IV & VI
September 1944	September 1945	Supermarine Spitfire	PR.XIX
November 1950	November 1953	Avro Lancaster	PR.1
November 1950	November 1953	Vickers Valetta	C.1

== Squadron bases ==
Bases and airfields used by no. 683 Squadron RAF, data from
From	To	Base	Remark
8 February 1943	22 November 1943	RAF Luqa, Malta	
22 November 1943	20 December 1943	RAF El Aouina, Tunisia	
20 December 1943	21 September 1945	RAF San Severo, Italy	Dets. all over Italy
1 August 1950	26 February 1951	RAF Fayid, Egypt	
26 February 1951	23 April 1951	RAF Kabrit, Egypt	
23 April 1951	24 September 1951	RAF Eastleigh, Kenya	Dets. at Livingstone, Northern Rhodesia and Dar-es-Salaam, Tanganyika
24 September 1951	12 December 1951	RAF Kabrit, Egypt	Det. at RAF Shaibah, Iraq
12 December 1951	22 May 1952	RAF Khormaksar, Aden	Det. at RAF Habbaniya, Iraq
22 May 1952	30 November 1953	RAF Habbaniya, Iraq	Det. at RAF Sharjah, Trucial States

== Commanding officers ==
Officers commanding no. 683 squadron RAF, data from
From	To	Name
February 1943	October 1943	W/Cdr. A. Warburton, DSO and Bar, DFC and Bar
October 1943	August 1944	S/Ldr. H.S. Smith, DFC
August 1944	April 1945	S/Ldr. R.T. Turton, DFC
April 1945	September 1945	S/Ldr. E.R. Pearson, DFC
November 1950	1952	S/Ldr. I.D.N. Lawson
1952	November 1953	S/Ldr. N.N. Ezekiel

== See also ==
- List of Royal Air Force aircraft squadrons
