= AHQ Malta =

WW2 command of the British Royal Air Force

Air Headquarters Malta AHQ Malta
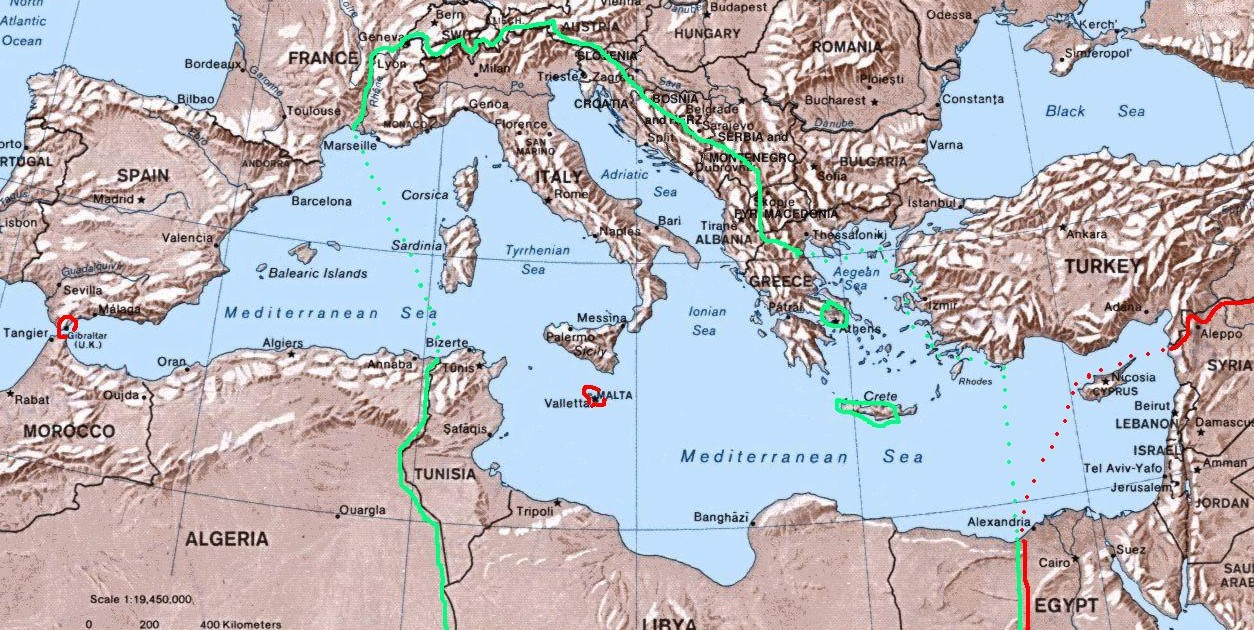
- The importance of defending AHQ Malta, the lone Allied bastion in the Mediterranean theater in 1942, is emphasized by this map of the Italian Mare Nostrum.
- Active: 28 December 1941 – 30 June 1968
- Country: United Kingdom
- Branch: Royal Air Force
- Type: Command
- Part of: RAF Middle East Command (1939)
- Headquarters: Valletta (1945)
- Motto: Accidet Nemo Impune

Air Headquarters Malta (AHQ Malta or Air H.Q. Malta) was an overseas command of the Royal Air Force (RAF) during the Second World War. It was established on 28 December 1941 by renaming RAF Mediterranean under Air Vice Marshal Hugh Lloyd. Lloyd was named Air Officer Commanding in Malta on 1 June 1941.

AHQ Malta played a key defensive role during the war when Malta was under siege by Axis forces between 11 June 1940 to 20 November 1942. In 1943 it then became a major sub-command centre for the Allies under the Mediterranean Air Command (MAC) when the Allies began their attack on Sicily, Italy.

AHQ Malta remained in operation under British command until 1968 when it was disbanded. The British withdrew from Malta in 1979.

== History ==
No. 267 Squadron RAF and No. 268 Squadron RAF, both with seaplanes, were formed at RAF Kalafrana in August 1918.

RAF Mediterranean had been based in Malta under one designation or another throughout the interwar period, spending some time known as 'Mediterranean Group'.

Despite concerns that the island, far from Britain and close to Italy, could not be defended, the British decided in July 1939 to increase the number of anti-aircraft guns and fighter aircraft on Malta. During 1940 Malta's air defence force had been built up from Faith, Hope, and Charity, the three famous Sea Gladiators of the Hal Far Fighter Flight.

== Defending Malta 1940 to 1942 ==
During the early stage of the Siege of Malta (11 June 1940 to 20 November 1942), which was also early in the wider North African Campaign, Axis powers did not consider Malta much of an offensive threat. However it was considered an essential Allied stronghold. This was exemplified by Operation Pedestal and the other, often very costly, efforts to resupply the island.

On 20 April 1942, the USS Wasp delivered 47 Spitfires to Malta. Although the German Luftwaffe promptly destroyed 30 of them on the same day, the defensive and offensive capabilities of AHQ Malta grew as a result of these and other aircraft reaching the island in the summer of 1942. On 1 July 1942, AHQ Malta had approximately 200 aircraft, about half of which were Spitfires.

Air Vice Marshal Sir Keith Park took over command of AHQ Malta on 15 July 1942.

At this time, the island provided critical operational air bases for the Allies with proximity to Axis shipping lanes and the battlefields of Egypt, Libya, Tunisia, Pantelleria, Sicily, Sardinia, Corsica, and mainland Italy during World War II. There were three main airfields on Malta known as RAF Hal Far, RAF Luqa, and RAF Ta' Kali with an intermediate landing area known as the Safi Dispersal Strip.

During the month of October in 1942, when the Second Battle of El Alamein was being waged, Allied forces were credited with the destruction of 59 percent of the German tonnage and 45 percent of the Italian tonnage shipped to Rommel's Axis forces in North Africa. This attrition was a significant aspect of Rommel's defeat and was in large part due to AHQ Malta, and the British and American heavy bombers of No. 205 Group.

== On the offensive 1943 ==
In February 1943, AHQ Malta became a major sub-command of the Mediterranean Air Command (MAC) following a decision by the Allies at their Casablanca Conference in January 1943.

=== Operation Husky - Order of battle July 1943 ===
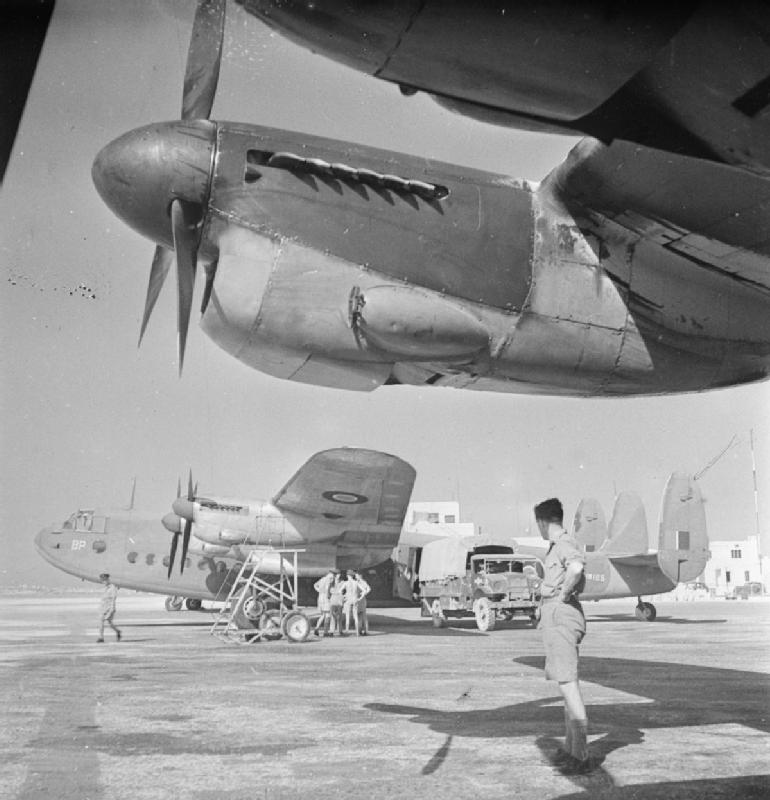
An Avro York of No. 246 Squadron RAF being loaded at RAF Luqa. Date not certain but between 1943 and 1945.

When the Allies invaded Sicily (Operation Husky) on 10 July 1943, AHQ Malta directed the units below.

No. 248 Wing RAF	Spitfire units	Other units
No. 69 Squadron RAF Martin Baltimore	No. 40 Squadron SAAF	No. 23 Squadron RAF, de Havilland Mosquito
No. 108 Squadron RAF, Bristol Beaufighter	No. 126 Squadron RAF	No. 73 Squadron RAF Det., Hurricane
No. 221 Squadron RAF, Vickers Wellington	No. 185 Squadron RAF	No. 256 Squadron RAF Det., Mosquito
No. 272 Squadron RAF, Beaufighter	No. 229 Squadron RAF	No. 600 Squadron RAF, Beaufighter
No. 683 Squadron RAF, Spitfire	No. 249 Squadron RAF	815 Naval Air Squadron Det. (FAA), Fairey Albacore
826 Naval Air Squadron (FAA)	No. 1435 Flight RAF	No. 983 Balloon Squadron

Notes: SAAF=South African Air Force; Det.=Detachment.

Some other squadrons and flights from the Northwest African Tactical and Coastal Air Forces were detached to Malta prior to the invasion of Sicily including Nos. 92 and 93 Squadrons and the 31st Fighter Group with Spitfires, 47th Bombardment Group with A-20s, and the 57th and 79th Fighter Groups with P-40s.

==== Famous Aces ====
Some famous Aces stationed on Malta were Rhodesian Johnny Plagis and the Canadian fighter pilots George "Screwball" Beurling and Wally McLeod.

== Evolving responsibilities after 1944 to disbandment in 1968 ==
In mid-1945 the only flying units under the control of AHQ Malta were two air-sea rescue squadrons, No. 283 Squadron RAF (flying Warwicks and Walruses from Hal Far), No. 284 Squadron RAF (with the same types of aircraft from Elmas in Sardinia), 22 Squadron SAAF (flying Venturas at Gibraltar), and 782 Naval Air Squadron (with Fulmars and Defiants at Hal Far). 782 NAS was administered by the local naval commander.

During 1946 the remaining installations in Algeria and Tunisia were handed back to the French Armed Forces, but this left AHQ Malta still commanding units in Sicily, Sardinia, Corsica and Maison Blanche in Algeria. Withdrawal from these locations took a few more months.

No. 38 Squadron RAF (a maritime reconnaissance unit flying Warwicks and Wellingtons) and No. 73 Squadron RAF (flying Spitfire IXs) arrived in 1946. The No.73 Squadron initially flew from Hal Far but was moved to Takali thus allowing Hal Far to be handed over to be used by the Royal Navy carrier squadron.

On 1 July 1947, Air Vice Marshal C R Steele had AHQ Malta take over El Adem, Benina, and Castel Benito stations in Libya from No. 205 Group RAF in the Canal Zone. This was just before the RAF presence at Elmas in Sardinia closed down on 10 December 1947.

No. 37 Squadron RAF, which had arrived from Palestine in 1948, left Luqa for RAF Khormaksar in Aden in July 1957. While four Avro Shackleton aircraft and the squadron's identity were transferred to Aden, two aircraft were left to join No. 38 Squadron RAF, still at Luqa. In 1965, Air Vice-Marshal Robert Deacon-Elliott arrived at Gibraltar to serve as both commander RAF Gibraltar and AOC AHQ Malta. His appointment also carried the 38 Squadron, which was disbanded early in 1967. In 1968 the station at Takali also closed. AHQ Malta was disbanded on 30 June 1968, and the air vice marshal flew home the following day.

== AHQ Malta Air Office commanders ==
Date started	Date ended	Duration months	Air Officer Commanding	Headquarters	Comments
1 June 1941	14 July 1942	13.5	Air Vice Marshal Hugh Lloyd	Valletta, Malta	Initially named RAF Mediterranean until renamed AHQ Malta on 28 December 1941
15 July 1942	25 March 1944	20.5	Air Vice Marshal Sir Keith Park	Valletta, Malta	
26 March 1944	18 October 1944	7	Air Vice Marshal R. M. Foster	Valletta, Malta	
19 October 1944	June 1947	32	Air Vice Marshal K. B. Lloyd	Valletta, Malta	
June 1947	?	?	Air Vice Marshal C R Steele CB DFC	?	
?	1952	?	Air Vice Marshal N.H. D'Aeth	?	Known as "Fortress Commander"
1952	?	?	?	?	
1965	30 June 1968	~36 months	Air Vice-Marshal Robert Deacon-Elliott	Gibraltar	Serve as both commander RAF Gibraltar and AOC AHQ Malta as well as Deputy Commander-in-Chief (Air), Allied Forces Mediterranean.

== Air Commander Malta from 1968 to British withdrawal in 1979 ==
The remaining units were only Nos 13 and 39 Squadrons, both at Luqa flying photo-reconnaissance Canberras. The organisation and administration of the remaining units was passed to RAF Luqa, where an Air Commodore with the title of Air Commander Malta was installed, while overall control passed to Near East Air Force in Cyprus. Air Commander Malta assumed direct command of RAF units assigned to Malta. On 1 February 1969 No. 203 Squadron RAF was transferred from RAF Ballykelly to Hal Far, though it soon moved to Luqa. Re-equipment of the squadron from Shackletons to BAe Nimrods soon began. In October 1970 39 Squadron was moved back to Wyton in the UK.

203 Squadron was disbanded on 31 December 1977 and 13 Squadron flew home to Wyton in October 1978. The post of Air Commander Malta ceased to exist when the British withdrew from Malta on 31 March 1979.
