= 1956 London Heathrow Avro Vulcan crash =

Military aviation incident at Heathrow Airport, London, England

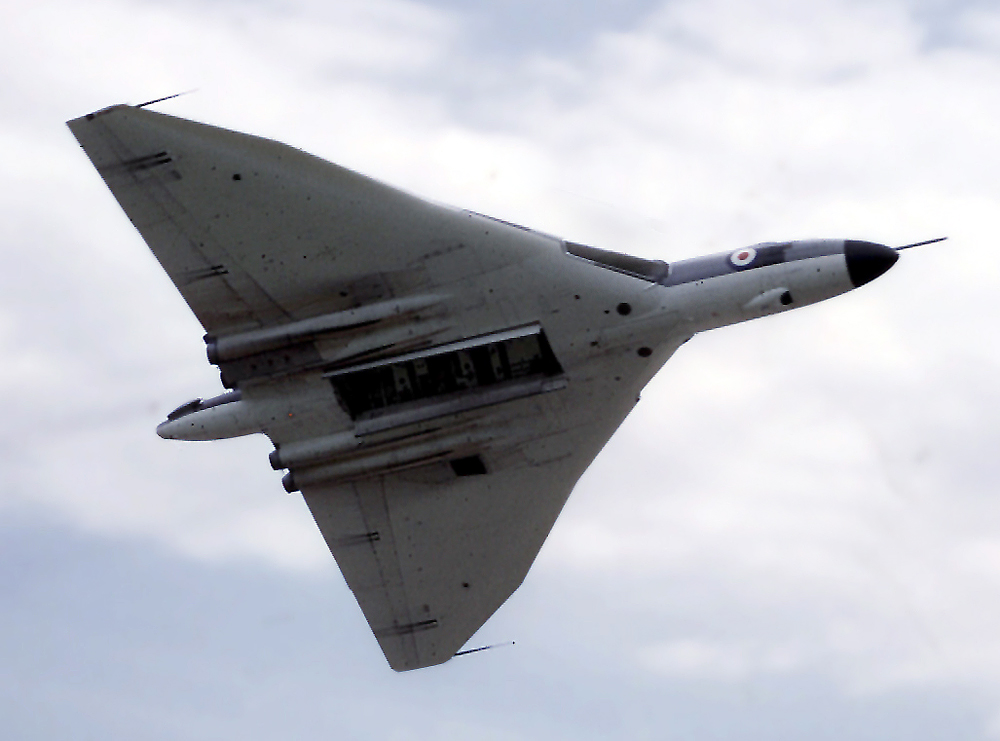
- A Vulcan B.1A similar to the accident aircraft

Accident
- Date: 1 October 1956
- Summary: Pilot error
- Site: London Heathrow Airport; 51.474°N 0.431°W

Aircraft
- Aircraft type: Avro Vulcan
- Operator: Royal Air Force
- Registration: XA897
- Flight origin: No. 230 Operational Conversion Unit RAF, RAF Waddington
- Last stopover: RAF Khormaksar, Aden
- Destination: London Heathrow Airport
- Passengers: 1 (Technical advisor from the Avro company)
- Crew: 5
- Fatalities: 4
- Survivors: 2

The 1956 London Heathrow Avro Vulcan crash was a military aviation accident that occurred at Heathrow Airport on 1 October 1956 when Avro Vulcan B.1 XA897 crashed while attempting to land in poor weather. The captain and co-pilot ejected safely but the remaining three crew and one passenger were killed.

== Background ==
XA897 was the first Vulcan bomber delivered to the Royal Air Force; after arriving at RAF Waddington, the aircraft was loaned to C-in-C Air Marshal Sir Harry Broadhurst and Squadron Leader Donald "Podge" Howard for a 26,000 mi (42,000 km; 23,000 nmi) round the world trip to showcase the aircraft's advanced design. Between 9 September and 1 October 1956, XA897 flew to Australia and New Zealand and was accompanied by three Avro Shackletons containing ground-crew and parts to service the Vulcan.

Leaving Australia, the Vulcan flew to RAF Khormaksar in Aden. It took off from there at 02:50 hours GMT and was scheduled to arrive shortly after 10 o'clock in the morning at London Heathrow.

== Accident ==
The Vulcan had been fitted with bomb bay fuel tanks to cover the great distance from Aden and the aircraft approached Heathrow in torrential rain. At the controls were Howard and, co-pilot, Broadhurst. In the rear of the aircraft were three RAF crewmen and a civilian technical advisor from Avro.

Due to the heavy rain and visibility reduced to 500 ft (150 m), XA897 was on a ground controlled approach (GCA) and was informed by Heathrow's air traffic controller that they were above the glide slope (GS) and needed to lose altitude. The crew reduced height too much, with their air speed close to the minimum drag point for a gear down configuration. As a result, the Vulcan was 1,030 yd (940 m) short of the runway and the initial contact with the ground removed the aircraft's undercarriage.

The pilot attempted to regain control but was unable and he and the co-pilot both ejected. The low level made it impossible for Squadron Leader Stroud (Howard's regular co-pilot who was in the aircraft's radar navigator's seat), Squadron Leader Eames, Squadron Leader Gamble, and Frederick Bassett to escape, and they were killed.

== Cause ==
The court of inquiry convened to review the crash determined that XA897's approach was affected by poor visibility due to heavy rain (three Russian Tu-104 aircraft carrying the Bolshoi Ballet had already been diverted away from Heathrow to RAF Manston that morning) and that the aircraft was not equipped to use the instrument landing system (ILS) installed at Heathrow. The approach to Runway 10L was undertaken using a ground controlled approach (GCA) (the first time Howard had done this). Howard attempted to abort the landing believing he was at 150 ft (46 m) he applied power but his aircraft collided with the ground which removed his undercarriage and severely damaged the Vulcan's control surfaces. The aircraft's port wing was almost vertical and with no prospect of recovery he and Broadhurst ejected. The low level made it impossible for Stroud, Eames, Gamble, and Bassett to exit the aircraft and they were killed.

== Later claim of accident cause ==
In 2016 Maurice Hamlin, a former member of the RAF on duty the day of the crash, claimed in his book The Hidden Truth that Harry Broadhurst ignored three direct orders to divert away from Heathrow due to the poor weather conditions (noting other aircraft had already been diverted). Hamlin believes that Broadhurst continued to attempt to land despite such orders due to the waiting press and dignitaries. He further claims that a fifty-year D-Notice had been placed on the incident, even though numerous Air Ministry and Board of Trade files relating to the crash are available at the UK National Archives.

== Timeline ==
- 02:50 GMT - XA897 leaves Aden
- 09:58 GMT - XA897 informed weather at London Heathrow as 2/8ths cloud at 300 ft (91 m); 7/8ths cloud at 700 ft (210 m); main cloud base 5,000 ft (1,500 m); visibility 1,100 yd (1,000 m); heavy rain and little wind.
- (XA897 had sufficient fuel to divert to RAF Waddington if required where the weather forecast was 1/8th cloud at 600 ft (180 m); 3/8ths at 8,000 ft (2,400 m); main base 13,000 ft (4,000 m); visibility 3 nautical miles.)
- 10:04 GMT - the Vulcan was at 1,500 ft (460 m), five miles from touch down on Runway 10 Left, and began its descent under GCA with a QNH of 1017 millibars both set on the Captain's and co-pilot's altimeters.
- (The Captain started the approach and went above the glide path by 80 ft (24 m), then over correcting and going 100 ft (30 m) too low, believing he was on the correct glide path.)
- 10:05 - at 1,030 yd (940 m) from touch down XA897 made initial contact with the ground, removing both main undercarriage units.

== Bibliography ==
- RAF Court of Inquiry into accident involving Vulcan XA897 at London Airport on 1 October 1956 - The National Archives
