= XII Tactical Air Command =

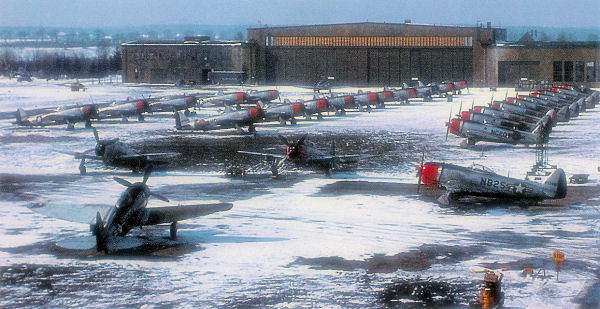
- P-47 Thunderbolts during the occupation of Germany (Note: Aircraft are from the 526th Fighter Squadron at Neubiberg Air Base.)
- Active: 1942-1947
- Country: United States
- Branch: United States Air Force
- Role: Command of tactical units
- Engagements: Mediterranean Theater of Operations

Commanders
- Notable commanders: Glenn O. Barcus

Insignia
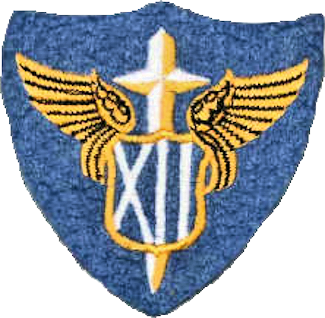
- Patch with unofficial XII Tactical Air Command emblem

The XII Tactical Air Command was a formation of the United States Army Air Forces. Its last assignment was with the United States Air Forces in Europe at Bad Kissingen, Germany, where it was inactivated on 10 November 1947.

== History ==
The 12th Ground Air Support Command was activated on 17 September 1942 at Birmingham Army Air Field, Alabama, where it drew its initial cadre from the 3d Ground Air Support Command. Within a week, it had moved to Bolling Field, District of Columbia, to prepare for the invasion of North Africa and changed its name to XII Air Support Command.

The command participated in Operation Torch, the invasion of North Africa in November 1942. However, it confined itself to administering air affairs in French Morocco until January 1943. On 6 January 1943, it was attached to the Satin Task Force, primarily composed of elements of the II Corps and after 13 January was fully engaged with support of II Corps in its attack through central Tunisia. This campaign proved to be a test for United States air support doctrine and tactics. No pilots or planes trained for night reconnaissance were available, and photographic reconnaissance with Douglas A-20 Havocs was only available late in the campaign. Tying the command to a single corps also kept it from supporting other organizations participating in the campaign, such as the French XIX Corps, even when resources were available.

The XII Tactical Air Command then shifted its focus from North Africa to the Mediterranean, where it provided fighter and bomber support for the invasion of Italy and later combat along the southern coast of France. In August 1944, the command relocated from Italy to France to continue aerial support for advancing ground forces.

Its composition evolved over time, with various fighter and bomber wings being assigned or detached as operational needs dictated. The 64th Fighter Wing had the longest continuous service with XII Tactical Air Command, from March 1943 to June 1947. By 1944, the Command was controlling five former Twelfth and Ninth Air Force P-47 Thunderbolt groups through its 64th Fighter Wing.

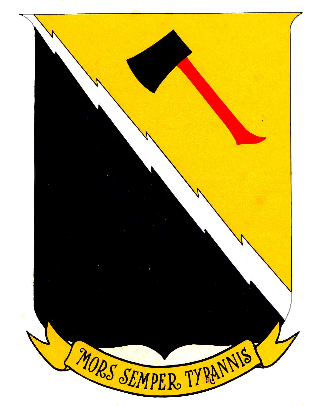
The 64th Fighter Wing was a part of the XII Tactical Air Command the longest. From March 1943 to June 1947.

For the final seven months of World War II in Europe, from November 1944 to May 1945, XII Tactical Air Command was assigned to the First Tactical Air Force (Provisional). This newly formed air command was rapidly assembled in southeastern France to provide air support and coordination for the Franco-American Sixth Army Group, which consisted of the U.S. Seventh Army and the French First Army.

After the Allied victory it remained in Europe as part of the occupation force.

Colonel Demas T. Craw was awarded the Medal of Honor for action during the invasion of Algeria-French Morocco: when the Allies landed on 8 November 1942, Col Craw volunteered to negotiate an armistice; while trying to pass through the lines near Port Lyautey, he was killed by machine-gun fire.

== Lineage ==
- Constituted as the 12th Ground Air Support Command on 10 September 1942

Activated on 17 September 1942
Redesignated XII Air Support Command on 24 September 1942
Redesignated XII Tactical Air Command in April 1944
Inactivated in Germany on 10 November 1947
Disbanded on 8 October 1948

=== Assignments ===
- Third Air Force, 17 September 1942 (attached to First Air Force after 25 September 1942)
- Twelfth Air Force, 9 November 1942 (attached to Allied Air Support Command after 22 January 1943)
- Northwest African Air Forces, c. 18 February 1943 (attached to Allied Air Support Command (later Northwest African Tactical Air Force c. 18 – 10 February December 1943, further attached to No. 242 Group RAF March 43)
- Twelfth Air Force, c. 10 December 1943 (attached to No. 242 Group RAF, Tactical Air Force, Mediterranean Allied Air Forces January 1944 – April 1944)
- First Tactical Air Force (Provisional), November 1944 to May 1945
- United States Air Forces in Europe, 15 November 1945 – 10 November 1947

=== Stations ===
- Birmingham Army Air Field, Alabama, 17 September 1942
- Bolling Field, District of Columbia, 25 September – 18 October 1942
- French Morocco, 9 November 1942
- Algeria, January 1943
- Tunisia, 13 March 1943
- Sicily, Italy, c. 12 July 1943
- Italy, c. 9 September 1943
- France, 18 August 1944
- Germany, 27 March 1945
- Erlangen (R-96), Germany, July 1945
- Bad Kissingen (R-98), Germany, 1 November 1945 – 10 November 1947

=== Components ===
Wings

- 3rd Air Defense Wing (later 64th Fighter Wing): 9 March 1943 – 5 June 1947 (attached to First Tactical Air Force (Provisional) 27 November 1944 – May 1945)
- 5th Bombardment Wing: c. 13 October 1942 – 1 November 1943
- 7th Fighter Wing, 27 September 1942 – 7 January 1943 (attached to First Air Force to c. 17 October 1942; Task Force A to 8 November 1942; Moroccan Composite Wing (Provisional) to 6 January 1943)
- 42d Bombardment Wing: 27 November 1944 – 6 January 1945, 21 May – 26 July 1945
- 57th Bombardment Wing: 31 August 1943 – 1 January 1944
- 63d Fighter Wing: 14 June – December 1945
- 64th Fighter Wing: March 1943 – June 1947
- 70th Fighter Wing: 2 December 1945 – 25 September 1947
- 71st Fighter Wing: 25 September–November 1945
- 87th Fighter Wing: 11 January-22 September 1944

Groups

- 12th Bombardment Group: 1 September 1943 – 2 January 1944
- 31st Fighter Group: November 1942 – 24 July 1943
- 33d Fighter Group: 13 January – 18 February 1943; 14 March 1943 – 24 July 1943; 21 December 1943 – c. 20 February 1944 (under operational control of 64th Fighter Wing)
- 36th Fighter Group: 15 November 1945 – 15 February 1946
- 47th Bombardment Group, assigned 27 September – 31 December 1942; 22 January – 18 February 1943; attached 1 September 1943 – 6 October 1943; 10 December 1943 – 20 July 1944; 7–15 September 1944
- 50th Fighter Group, 29 September 1944 – 4 August 1945 (under operational control of 64th Fighter Wing until June 1945)
- 52nd Fighter Group: 18 February – 23 May 1943; 15 May – 25 June 1947
- 57th Fighter Group: attached 22 August 1943; assigned 1 September – 1 November 1943; 2 January – 23 April 1944 (attached to 64th Fighter Wing 2–28 March 1944)
- 68th Observation Group (later 68th Reconnaissance Group): c. 18 October 1942 – c. 18 June 1943 (attached to 5th Bombardment Wing after 31 October 1942)
- 69th Tactical Reconnaissance Group: 27 March – 20 May 1945
- 79th Fighter Group: attached c. 2–c. 14 June 1943; assigned 1 September – 1 November 1943 (attached to Northwest African Tactical Air Force)
- 86th Fighter-Bomber Group (later 86th Fighter Group): assigned c. November 1943 – 9 September 1944; 20 February 1945 – c. 30 April 1945 (attached to 64th Fighter Wing after 21 February 1945; attached 30 April 1945); assigned 20 June – August 1945; 1 March – 6 October 1947
- 340th Bombardment Group: 1 September – 1 November 1943; 2 January – 1 March 1944
- 344th Bombardment Group, 27 November 1945 – 15 February 1946
- 354th Fighter Group, 4 July 1945 – 15 February 1946
- 363d Reconnaissance Group, 15–20 November 1945
- 366th Fighter Group: 4 July 1945 – 20 August 1946
- 501st Tactical Control Group (see 555th Signal Aircraft Warning Battalion)

Squadrons

- 2d Air Support Communications Squadron (later 2d Tactical Air Communications Squadron): 2 February 1943 – 6 July 1943
- 4th Tactical Air Communications Squadron: 4 July 1945 – 5 June 1947
- 11th Tactical Air Communications Squadron: 4 July – c. 12 October 1945
- 14th Liaison Squadron: 4 July – 5 October 1945 (attached to Third Army after 26 June 1945)
- 18th Air Support Communications Squadron (later 18th Tactical Air Communications Squadron): c. 12 February – 10 June 1944
- 34th Photographic Reconnaissance Squadron: 3 October 1944 – 20 April 1945 (attached to Provisional Reconnaissance Group after 16 October 1944)
- 47th Liaison Squadron: 23 November 1945 – 1 February 1946
- 72d Liaison Squadron: 20 May – 3 July 1945
- 99th Fighter Squadron: 28 May 1943 – 1 May 1944 (attached to 33d Fighter Group, 29 May 1943; 324th Fighter Group, c. 19 June 1943; 33d Fighter Group 19 July 1943; 79th Fighter Group, 16 October 1943; 324th Fighter Group after 1 April 1944)
- 111th Observation Squadron (later 111th Reconnaissance Squadron, 111th Tactical Reconnaissance Squadron): attached 12–31 March 1943, 20 June 1943, assigned 26 May 1944 – 20 April 1945 (attached to Provisional Reconnaissance Group after 16 October 1944)
- 125th Liaison Squadron: 20 June – 15 December 1945
- 153d Liaison Squadron: attached 25 April 1944, assigned 15 July 1945 – 15 December 1945 (attached to Twelfth Army Group 15 November 1944, Seventh Army after 26 July 1945)
- 162d Tactical Reconnaissance Squadron: attached 16 October 1944 – 21 April 1945
- 167th Liaison Squadron: 20 May – 15 July 1945
- 365th Bombardment Squadron: 1 November – 25 December 1946
- 415th Night Fighter Squadron: 12 October – 5 December 1943
- 417th Night Fighter Squadron: 17 May – 26 June 1945

Other

- 555th Signal Aircraft Warning Battalion (later 501st Tactical Control Group), 15 November 1945 – 25 July 1947
