= Arthur Coningham (cricketer) =

Australian cricketer (1863–1939)

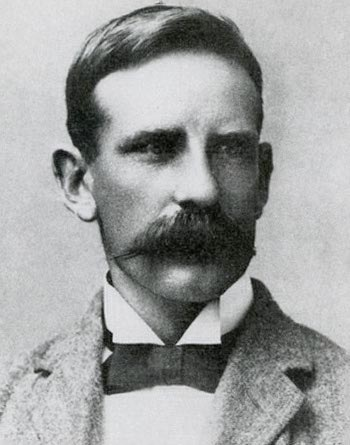

Personal information
- Born: 14 July 1863; Emerald Hill, Melbourne, Victoria, Australia
- Died: 13 June 1939 (aged 76); Gladesville, Sydney, New South Wales, Australia
- Height: 6 ft 2 in (1.88 m)
- Batting: Left-handed
- Bowling: Left-arm fast-medium
- Role: All-rounder
- Relatives: Arthur Coningham (son)

International information
- National side: Australia
- Only Test (cap 69): 29 December 1894 v England

Domestic team information
- Years: Team
- 1892/93–1898/99: New South Wales
- 1893/94–1895/96: Queensland

Career statistics
Competition	Test	First-class
Matches	1	35
Runs scored	13	896
Batting average	6.50	15.71
100s/50s	0/0	1/2
Top score	10	151
Balls bowled	186	5,871
Wickets	2	112
Bowling average	38.00	23.24
5 wickets in innings	0	7
10 wickets in match	0	0
Best bowling	2/17	6/38
Catches/stumpings	0/–	28/–
- Source: ESPNcricinfo, 10 September 2022

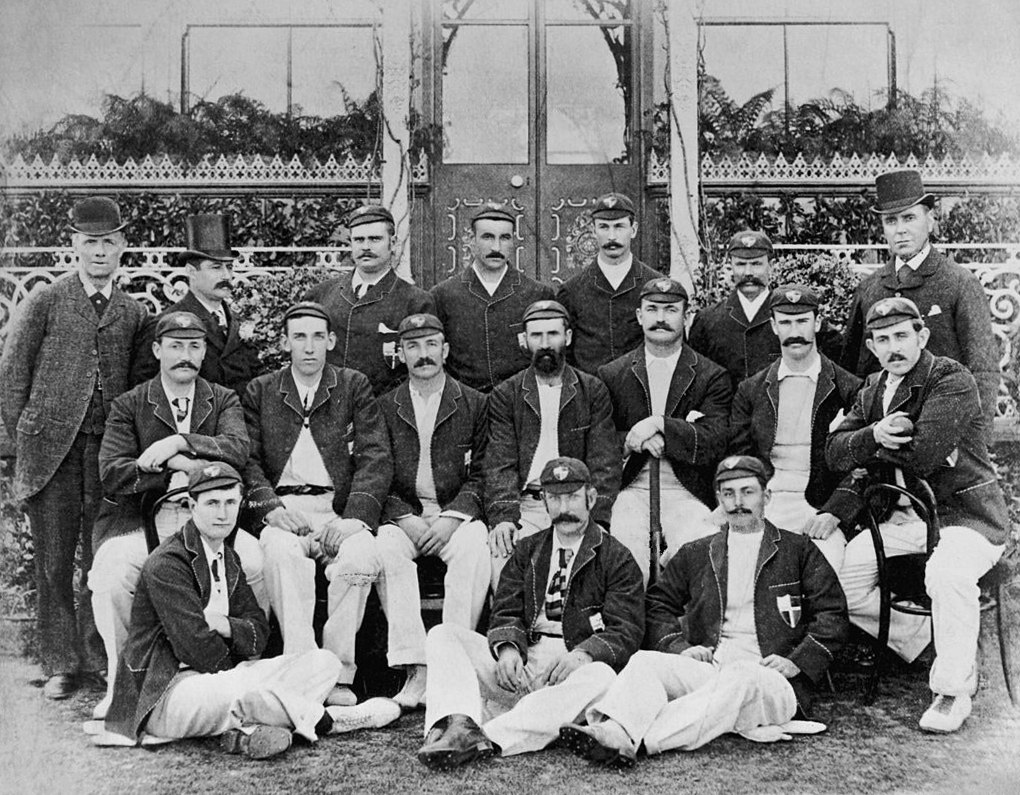
Coningham pictured middle (front row) with the 1893 Australia national cricket team

Arthur Coningham (/koʊnɪŋhæm/ 14 July 1863 – 13 June 1939) was an Australian cricketer who played in one Ashes Test match at Melbourne in 1894 in which he took a wicket with his very first ball. He took 2 for 17 in England's first innings but failed to add to that tally in the second.

== Biography ==
Coningham was born in the Melbourne suburb of Emerald Hill in 1863. A left-handed batsman and left-arm fast-medium bowler, he played first-class cricket for New South Wales and Queensland in the 1890s. His highest first-class score was 151 for Queensland against New South Wales in 1895–96. His best bowling figures were 6 for 38 for New South Wales against Victoria in the 1896–97 Sheffield Shield.

A colourful character, Coningham was renowned as something of a joker. In an effort to stay warm while fielding in a tour match in 1893 at a frigid Blackpool he gathered straw and twigs and started a fire on the outfield. He revealed another side of his character on that same tour, winning an award for bravery after diving into the River Thames to save a boy from drowning.

Coningham was a chemist by profession, but also at times worked as a hairdresser, tobacconist and bookmaker. He found life difficult after he retired from the game, serving time in jail for fraud, and he died in an asylum. Coningham was involved in a famous scandal in 1899 when he sued his wife for divorce on the basis of her adultery with a Catholic priest, Fr Denis O'Haran, personal secretary to Cardinal Moran. The jury found against Coningham and the couple emigrated to New Zealand. In 1912, his wife divorced him for adultery.

His son was the World War I air ace and World War II commander Air Marshal Sir Arthur Coningham. Coningham died in 1939 and was buried in the Rookwood Cemetery.
