= Northwest African Tactical Air Force =

The Northwest African Tactical Air Force (NATAF) was a component of the Northwest African Air Forces which itself reported to the Mediterranean Air Command (MAC). These new Allied air force organizations were created at the Casablanca Conference in January 1943 to promote cooperation between the British Royal Air Force (RAF), the American United States Army Air Force (USAAF), and their respective ground and naval forces in the North African and Mediterranean theater of World War II . Created on February 18, 1943, the NATAF and other MAC commands existed until December 10, 1943, when MAC was disbanded and the Mediterranean Allied Air Forces (MAAF) were established.

Acting Air Marshal Sir Arthur Coningham, who had been air officer commanding Western Desert Air Force became the commander of NATAF. and the WDAF became part of the new NATAF

== Composition ==
The components of NATAF at the time of the Allied invasion of Sicily (Operation Husky) on July 10, 1943, are illustrated below.

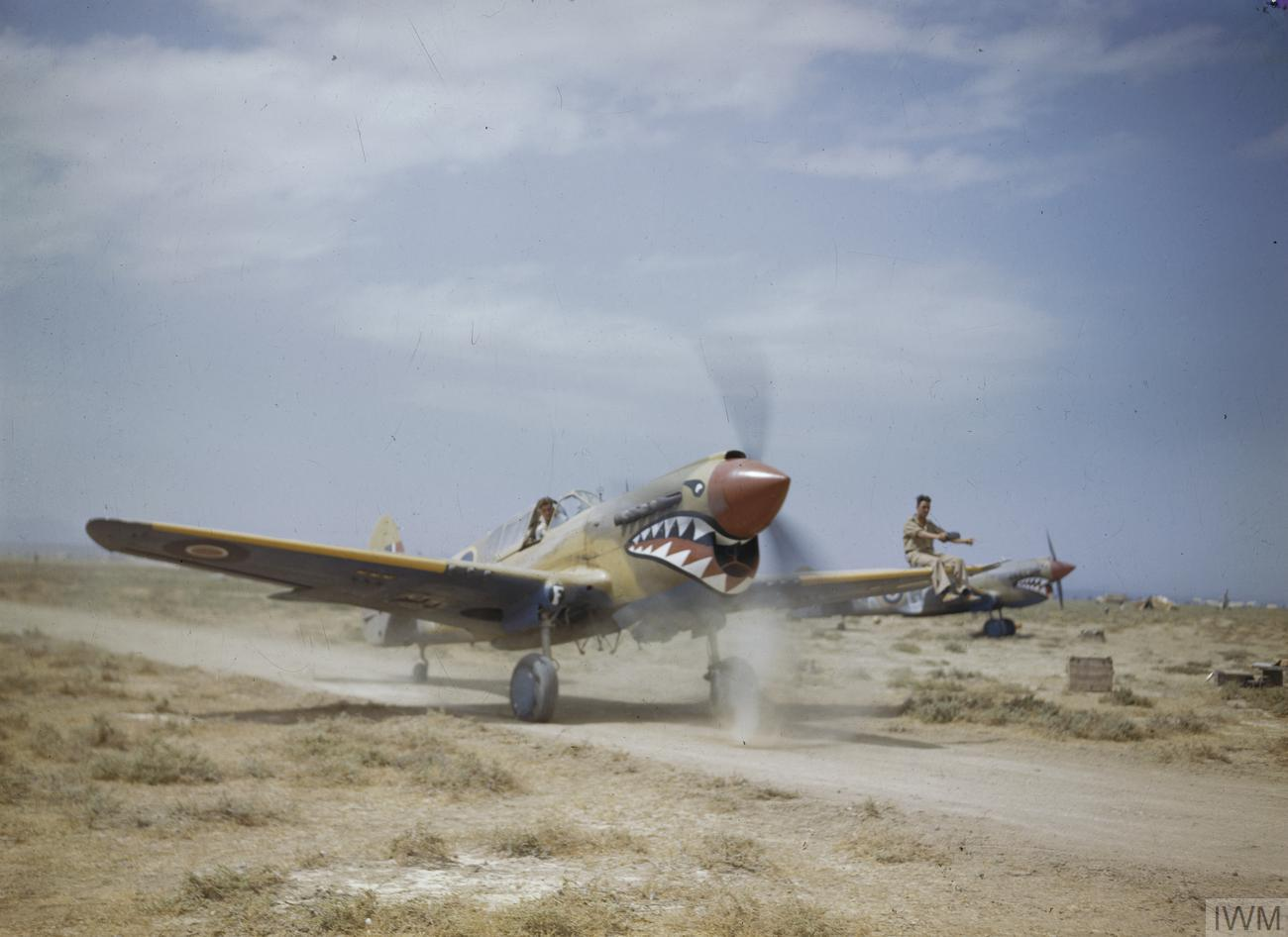
No. 112 Squadron Kittyhawk at Medenine, Tunisia in 1943.

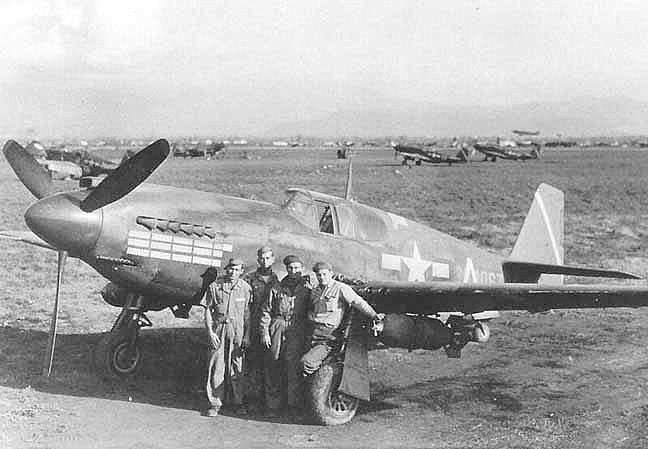
A 27th Fighter-Bomber Group North American A-36 Apache (Mustang).

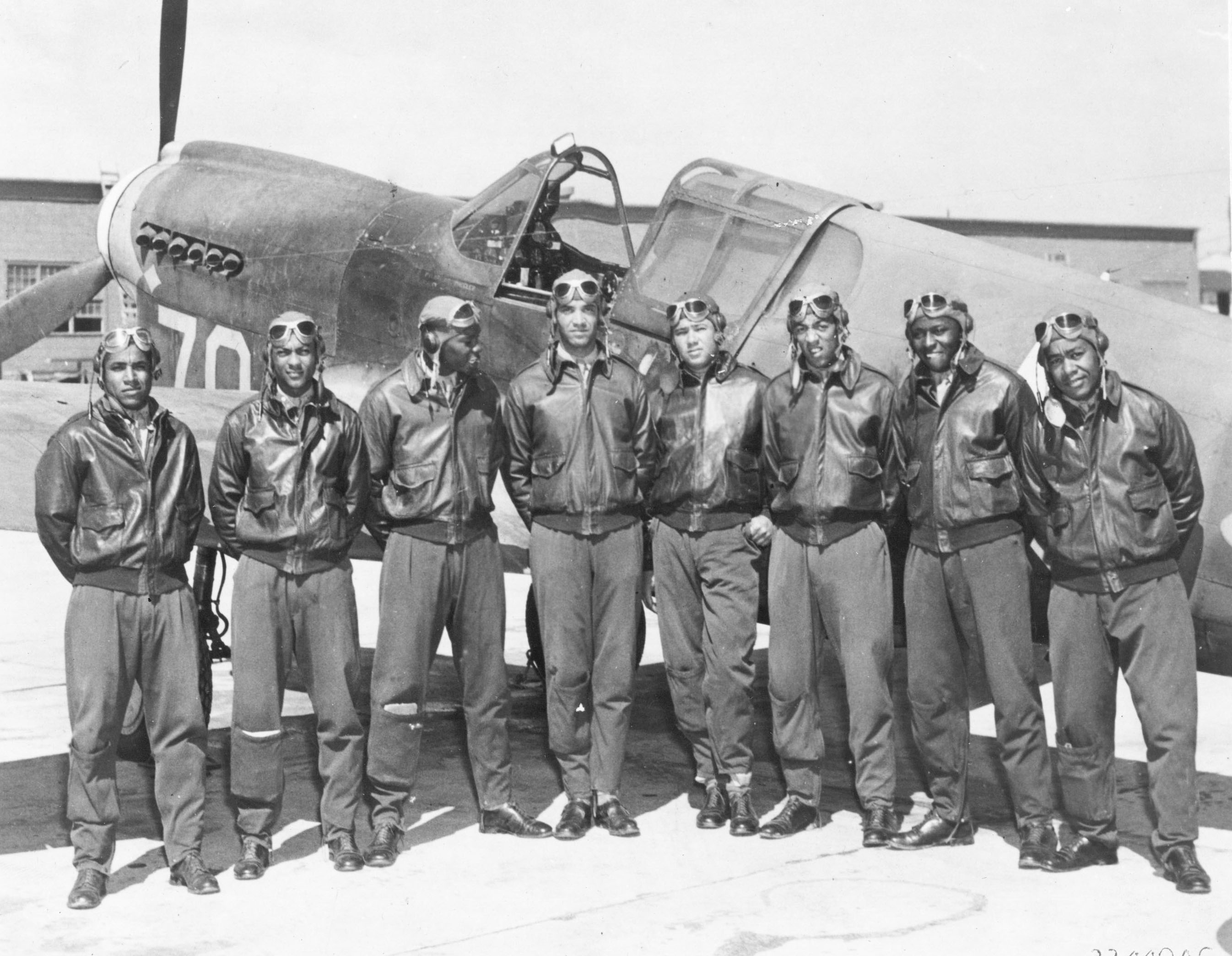
African American pilots of 99th Fighter Squadron standing by one of their P-40 Warhawks.

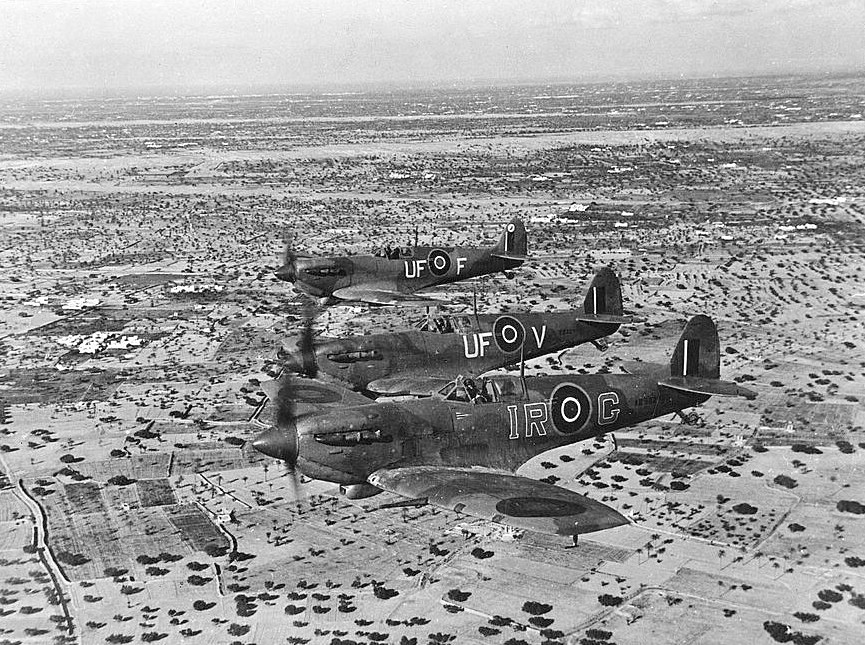
No. 601 Squadron Spitfires over North Africa in 1943.

Northwest African Tactical Air Force (Air Marshal Sir Arthur Coningham)
| Desert Air Force Air Vice Marshal Harry Broadhurst | XII Air Support Command Major General Edwin House | Tactical Bomber Force Air Commodore Laurence Sinclair |
|---|---|---|
| No. 7 Wing (SAAF) No. 2 Squadron, Supermarine Spitfire; No. 4 Squadron, Spitfire; No. 5 Squadron, Curtiss Kittyhawk (Note: The British and Commonwealth forces used "Kittyhawk" as service name for Curtiss P-40D and later models) | 27th Fighter-Bomber Group (USAAF); Lieutenant Colonel John Stevenson 522nd Squadron, North American A-36 (Note: Dive bomber version of the North American P-51 Mustang fighter/fighter-bomber)Mustang; 523rd Squadron, A-36 Mustang; 524th Squadron, A-36 Mustang | No. 3 Wing (SAAF) No. 12 Squadron, Douglas Boston light bomber No. 21 Squadron, Martin Baltimore light bomber No. 24 Squadron, Boston |
| No. 239 Wing No. 3 Squadron RAAF, Kittyhawk; No. 112 Squadron RAF, Kittyhawk; No. 250 Squadron RAF, Kittyhawk; No. 260 Squadron RAF, Kittyhawk; No. 450 Squadron RAAF, Kittyhawk | 86th Fighter-Bomber Group (USAAF); Major Clinton True 525th Squadron, A-36 Mustang; 526th Squadron, A-36 Mustang; 527th Squadron, A-36 Mustang | No. 232 Wing (RAF) No. 55 Squadron, Baltimore; No. 223 Squadron, Baltimore |
| No. 244 Wing (Note: 244 Wing was commanded by Ian Gleed until he was shot down on 16 April 16, 1943 then by W. G. G. Duncan Smith until replaced by Kingcome)Brian Kingcome (RAF) No. 1 Squadron SAAF, Spitfire; No. 92 Squadron RAF, Spitfire; No. 145 Squadron RAF, Spitfire; No. 417 Squadron RCAF, Spitfire; No. 601 Squadron RAF, Spitfire | 33d Fighter Group (USAAF); Colonel William Momyer 58th Squadron, P-40 Warhawk; 59th Squadron, P-40 Warhawk; 60th Squadron, P-40 Warhawk - 99th Squadron, P-40, Detached | No. 326 Wing (RAF) No. 18 Squadron, Boston; No. 114 Squadron, Boston |
| No. 322 Wing (RAF); Colin Falkland Gray (RAF) No. 81 Squadron, Spitfire; No. 152 Squadron, Spitfire; No. 154 Squadron, Spitfire; No. 232 Squadron, Spitfire; No. 242 Squadron, Spitfire | 324th Fighter Group (USAAF); Colonel William McNown 314th Squadron, P-40 Warhawk; 315th Squadron, P-40 Warhawk; 316th Squadron, P-40 Warhawk | 47th Bombardment Group (USAAF); Colonel Malcolm Green, Jr. 84th Squadron, A-20 Havoc (Note: American designation of the same aircraft as the Boston) light bomber 85th Squadron, A-20 Havoc; 86th Squadron, A-20 Havoc; 97th Squadron, A-20 Havoc |
| No. 324 Wing (RAF); Daniel Le Roy du Vivier (RAF (Note: le Roy du Vivier was a Belgian pilot who joined RAF in 1940)) No. 43 Squadron, Spitfire; No. 72 Squadron, Spitfire; No. 93 Squadron, Spitfire; No. 111 Squadron, Spitfire; No. 243 Squadron, Spitfire | 31st Fighter Group (USAAF); Lieutenant Colonel Frank Hill 307th Squadron, Spitfire; 308th Squadron, Spitfire; 309th Squadron, Spitfire | 12th Bombardment Group (USAAF); Colonel Edward Backus 81st Squadron, North American B-25 Mitchell medium bomber 82nd Squadron, B-25 Mitchell; 83rd Squadron, B-25 Mitchell; 434th Squadron, B-25 Mitchell |
| 57th Fighter Group (USAAF); Colonel Arthur Salisbury 64th Squadron, P-40 Warhawk; 65th Squadron, P-40 Warhawk; 66th Squadron, P-40 Warhawk | 111th Tactical Reconnaissance Squadron, Mustang | 340th Bombardment Group (USAAF); Lieutenant Colonel Adolph Tokaz 486th Squadron, B-25 Mitchell; 487th Squadron, B-25 Mitchell; 488th Squadron, B-25 Mitchell; 489th Squadron, B-25 Mitchell - |
| 79th Fighter Group (USAAF); Colonel Earl Bates 85th Squadron, P-40 Warhawk; 86th Squadron, P-40 Warhawk; 87th Squadron, P-40 Warhawk | | No. 225 Squadron (RAF), Spitfire |
| No. 285 Wing (Reconnaissance) No. 40 Squadron SAAF, Detachment, Spitfire; No. 60 Squadron SAAF, de Havilland Mosquito; No. 1437 Flight RAF, Mustang | | No. 241 Squadron RAF, Hurricane |
| No. 6 Squadron RAF, Hurricane | | |

For Operation Husky, No. 242 Group RAF, originally a component of NATAF in February 1943, was assigned to the Northwest African Coastal Air Force (NACAF). At the same time, Air Headquarters, Western Desert became known as Desert Air Force. All of the fighter units of Desert Air Force formed No. 211 (Offensive Fighter) Group commanded by Air Commodore Richard Atcherley on April 11, 1943, in Tripoli. The 99th Fighter Squadron (one of the Tuskegee Airmen units) was assigned to the XII Air Support Command on May 28, 1943, and subsequently attached to the 33rd Fighter Group. The actual squadron assignments and detachments varied throughout the war depending on the specific needs of the air force.

The table above illustrates the squadron assignments and commanders for the important period of World War II when the Allies prepared to invade Italy (Operation Husky), having just won the war in North Africa with the end of the Tunisia Campaign. In recognition of XII Air Support Command's operations in Sicily, Supreme Allied Commander General Dwight D. Eisenhower presented Major General Edwin House with the Legion of Merit and saying that "...for the first time established the application of a tactical air force operating in support of an American Army."

== See also ==
- List of Royal Air Force commands
