= Kenneth Cross =

Royal Air Force Air Chief Marshal (1911-2003)

Air Chief Marshal Sir Kenneth Cross
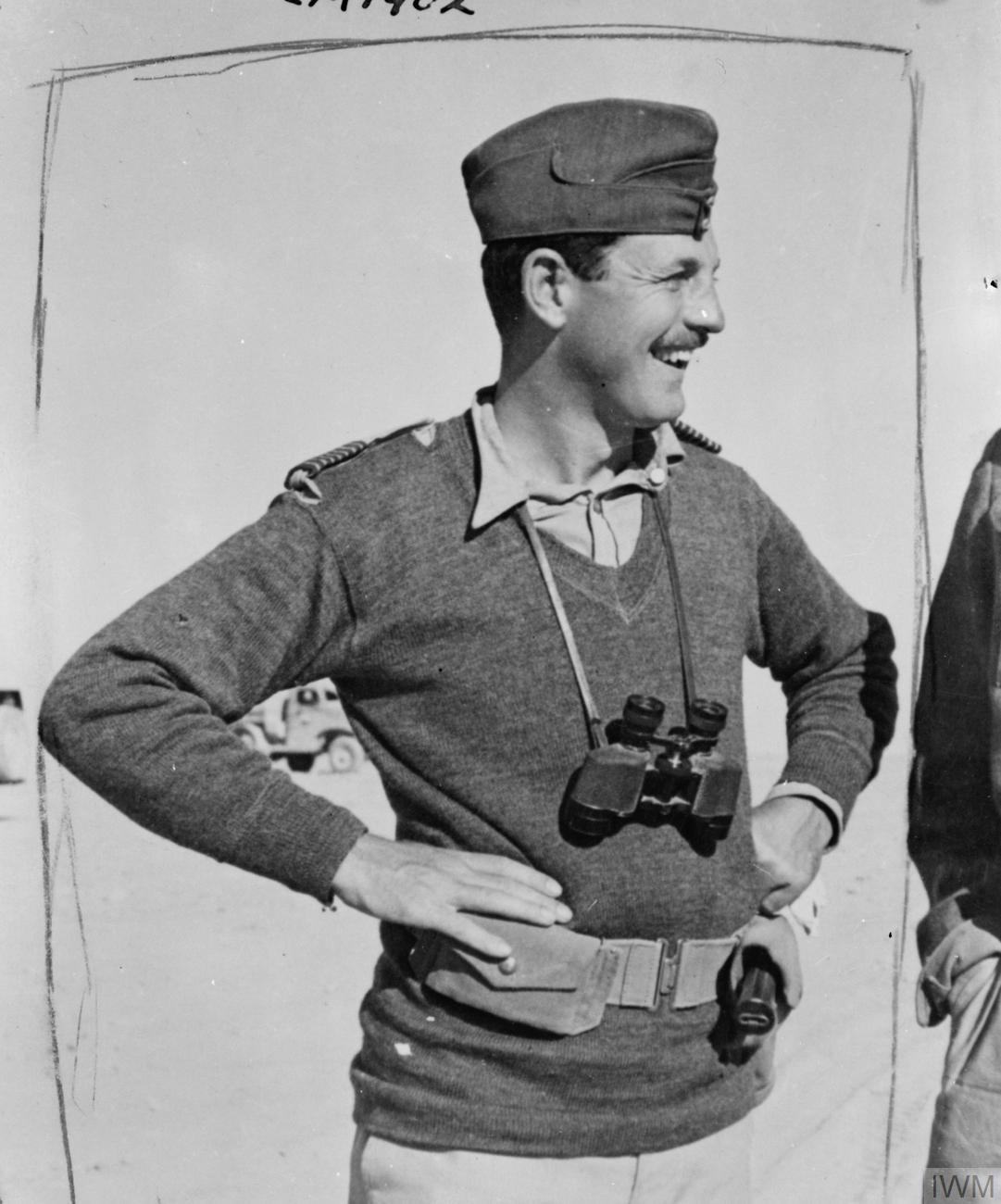
- Royal Air Force Operations in the Middle East and North Africa, 1939–1943.
- Born: 4 October 1911
- Died: 18 June 2003 (aged 91)
- Military career
- Allegiance: United Kingdom
- Branch: Royal Air Force
- Service years: 1930–67
- Rank: Air Chief Marshal
- Nickname: "Bing"
- Commands: Transport Command (1963–67); Bomber Command (1959–63); No. 3 Group (1956–59); No. 242 Group (1943–44); No. 212 Group (1943); No. 252 Wing (1942); No. 258 Wing (1941–42); No. 46 Squadron (1939–40)
- Conflicts: Second World War
- Awards: Knight Commander of the Order of the Bath; Commander of the Order of the British Empire; Distinguished Service Order; Distinguished Flying Cross; Mentioned in Despatches; War Cross with Sword (Norway); Officer of the Legion of Merit (United States); Officer of the Legion of Honour (France); Croix de guerre (France); Commander with Swords of the Order of Orange-Nassau (Netherlands)

Air Chief Marshal Sir Kenneth Brian Boyd Cross, KCB, CBE, DSO, DFC (4 October 1911 – 18 June 2003) was a senior Royal Air Force commander. He was commonly known as Bing.

== RAF career ==
The eldest son of Pembroke Henry Cokayne Cross (1884–1964) a chartered surveyor, and Jeanie Boyd (1888–1944), he was educated at Hilsea College in Portsmouth, Havant High School, and Kingswood School. Cross joined the Royal Air Force in April 1930. He first served with No. 25 Squadron in 1931, before a spell as instructor with 5 FTS at Sealand. In 1934 he was part of the Cambridge University Air Squadron. In December 1938 Squadron Leader Cross was appointed Auxiliary Liaison Officer at HQ, No 12 Group, Fighter Command.

Cross served in the Second World War and in October 1939 was appointed Officer Commanding No. 46 Squadron, conducting flying missions over Norway. For his service in Norway he was awarded the Norwegian War Cross with sword. Ordered to return to the United Kingdom in June 1940, his pilots achieved the seemingly impossible task of landing all their Hurricanes on the aircraft carrier HMS Glorious without arresting gear, along with ten Gloster Gladiators of No. 263 Squadron Their success was short-lived because on 8 June 1940 HMS Glorious and her two escort ships were attacked and sunk by the German battleship Scharnhorst and Gneisenau. Cross was one of only three officers and 41 other ranks rescued out of the three ships' companies. He had spent nearly three days and nights on a float in freezing temperatures before being rescued by a Norwegian fishing boat. He was awarded the Distinguished Flying Cross. After recovering from frostbitten feet he was appointed Officer Commanding No. 252 Wing in the Middle East and then took over No. 258 Wing before reverting to command of No. 252 Wing. In January 1943 he was made Air Officer Commanding No. 212 Group and in February 1943 he took over No. 242 Group receiving promotion to temporary group captain in July 1943. He became Air Commodore, Training at Headquarters Allied Expeditionary Air Force in March 1944 and Director of Overseas Operations (Tactical) in June 1944.

After the war he went to the Air Ministry as Director of Weapons and then as Director of Operations (Air Defence). He went on to be Air Officer Commanding No. 3 Group in 1956, Air Officer Commanding-in-Chief Bomber Command in 1959 and, following his promotion to air marshal in 1961, Air Officer Commanding-in-Chief Transport Command in 1963. He retired in 1967.

== Family ==
In 1945 he married Brenda Megan Powell, a former Women's Auxiliary Air Force office; they had two sons and a daughter.

Military offices
Preceded by Sir Edmund Hudleston	Commander-in-Chief Transport Command; 1963–1967	Succeeded by Sir Thomas Prickett
Preceded by Sir Harry Broadhurst	Commander-in-Chief Bomber Command; 1959–1963	Succeeded by Sir John Grandy
Preceded by Edmund Hudleston	Air Officer Commanding No. 3 Group; 1956–1959	Succeeded by Michael Dwyer
