= Harry Broadhurst =

Royal Air Force Air Chief Marshal (1905–1995)

Air Chief Marshal Sir Harry Broadhurst
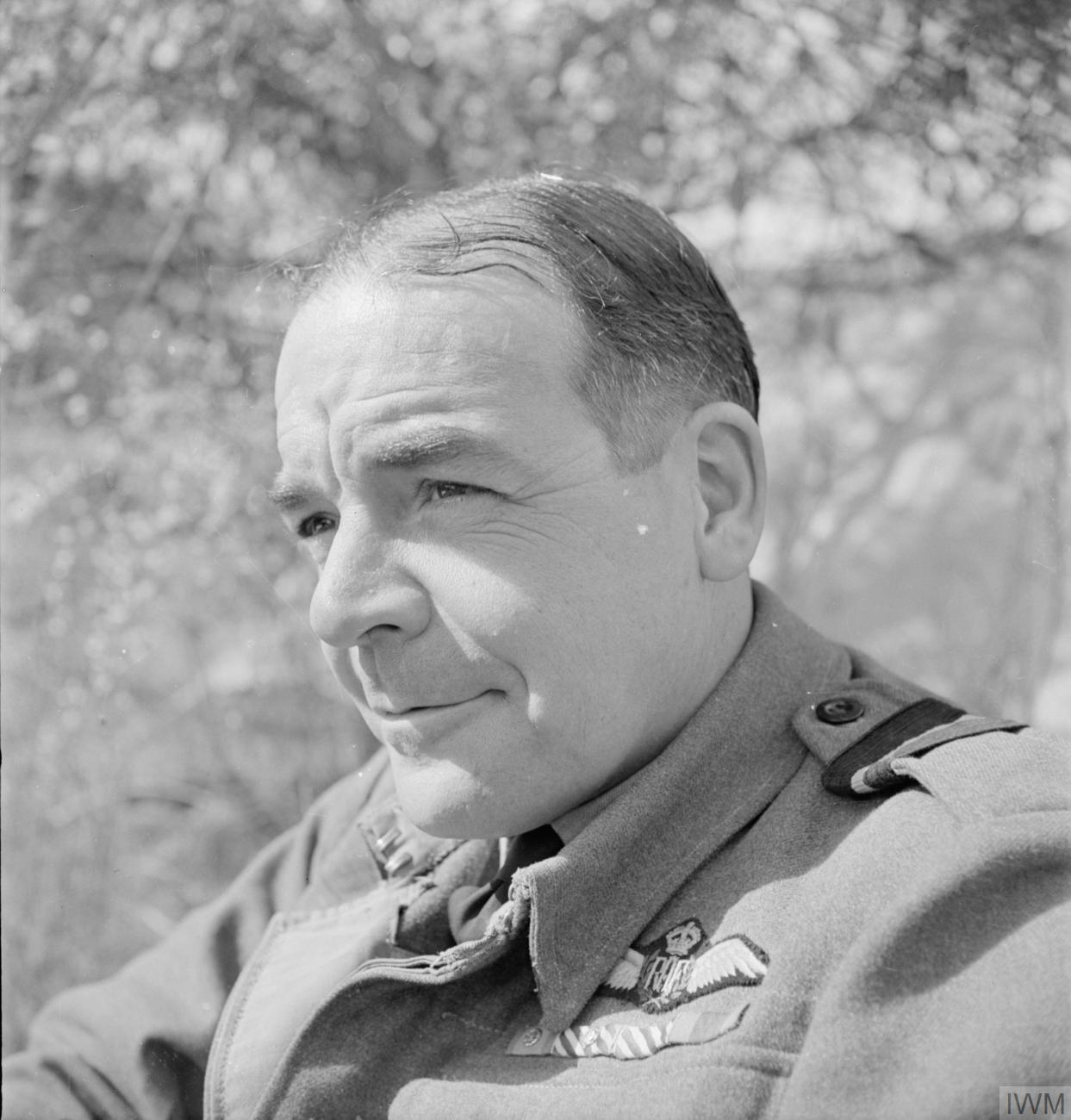
- Harry Broadhurst, pictured here while Air Officer Commanding, Western Desert Air Force.
- Born: 28 October 1905; Frimley, Surrey, England
- Died: 29 August 1995 (aged 89); Birdham, Chichester District, West Sussex, England
- Military career
- Allegiance: United Kingdom
- Branch: Royal Air Force
- Service years: 1925–1961
- Rank: Air Chief Marshal
- Nickname: "Broady"
- Service number: 24035
- Commands: Allied Air Forces Central Europe (1959–61); Bomber Command (1956–1959); Second Tactical Air Force (1953–1956); No. 61 Group (1946–1948); No. 83 Group (1944–1945); Desert Air Force (1943–1944); RAF Hornchurch (1941–1942); RAF Wittering (1940); RAF Coltishall (1940); No. 111 Squadron (1939–1940)
- Conflicts: Second World War
- Awards: Knight Grand Cross of the Order of the Bath; Knight Commander of the Order of the British Empire; Distinguished Service Order & Bar; Distinguished Flying Cross & Bar; Air Force Cross; Mentioned in Despatches (3); Officer of the Legion of Merit (United States); Grand Officer of the Order of Orange-Nassau (Netherlands)

See also Henry Broadhurst for the trade unionist and politician

Air Chief Marshal Sir Harry Broadhurst, GCB, KBE, DSO & Bar, DFC & Bar, AFC (28 October 1905 – 29 August 1995), commonly known as Broady, was a senior Royal Air Force commander and flying ace of the Second World War.

== Early life ==
Harry Broadhurst was born on 28 October 1905 in Frimley, Surrey, England. He was educated at Portsmouth Grammar School and after completing his schooling commenced training as a surveyor. In 1925, he joined the British Army as a second lieutenant in the Royal Artillery and then, the following year, transferred to the Royal Air Force (RAF).

Upon completion of his flight training, Broadhurst joined No. 11 Squadron in India in 1928, flying the Westland Wapiti and Hawker Hart over the North West frontier. He returned to the United Kingdom in 1931, joining No. 41 Squadron flying the Bristol Bulldog.

By the mid-1930s, Broadhurst was an accomplished pilot, flying fighters and doing acrobatics at air shows, gaining a reputation as an aerial daredevil with a flair for aerial acrobatics. In 1936, as a flight lieutenant, he was personally congratulated by the king on his aerobatic showing in the Gloster Gauntlet. Awarded the Air Force Cross in 1937, he served at the RAF Staff College in Andover. In January 1939 he was posted as Officer Commanding No. 111 Squadron.

== Second World War ==
In May 1940, Broadhurst was appointed Station Commander at RAF Coltishall, before joining No. 60 Wing in France as wing commander. He participated in ground support during the Battle of France, an experience that taught him the importance of close air support for later operations in the war. He was heavily involved in the Battle of Britain and as Officer Commanding RAF Wittering, often flew with the squadrons under his command, both day and night fighter units.

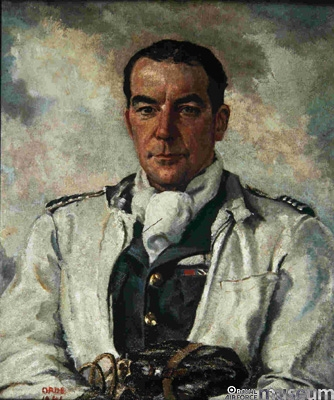
Harry Broadhurst by Cuthbert Orde, 1941

In December 1940, he was posted to command the Hornchurch Sector of No. 11 Group Fighter Command, and continued to fly on operations, even as a group captain.

On 4 July 1941, leading No. 54 Squadron as Red 1, he was involved in a dogfight with Bf 109s, claiming two Bf 109Es destroyed at 15.30 over Béthune before he was hit and his aircraft badly damaged by a Bf 109. He managed to return to base, belly landing his crippled Spitfire, with slight splinters in left arm and left thigh. On 7 July 1941 his Spitfire Mk.Vb was severely damaged by a JG 26 pilot. In the combat he was Red 1 and claimed 1-1-0 Bf 109F at 09.50 over Gravelines area. In May 1942 he became Senior Air Staff Officer (SASO), No. 11 Group, although he continued to fly operationally where possible. His final kill claims were made on 19 August 1942, bringing his total to 13 destroyed, seven probables and 10 damaged.

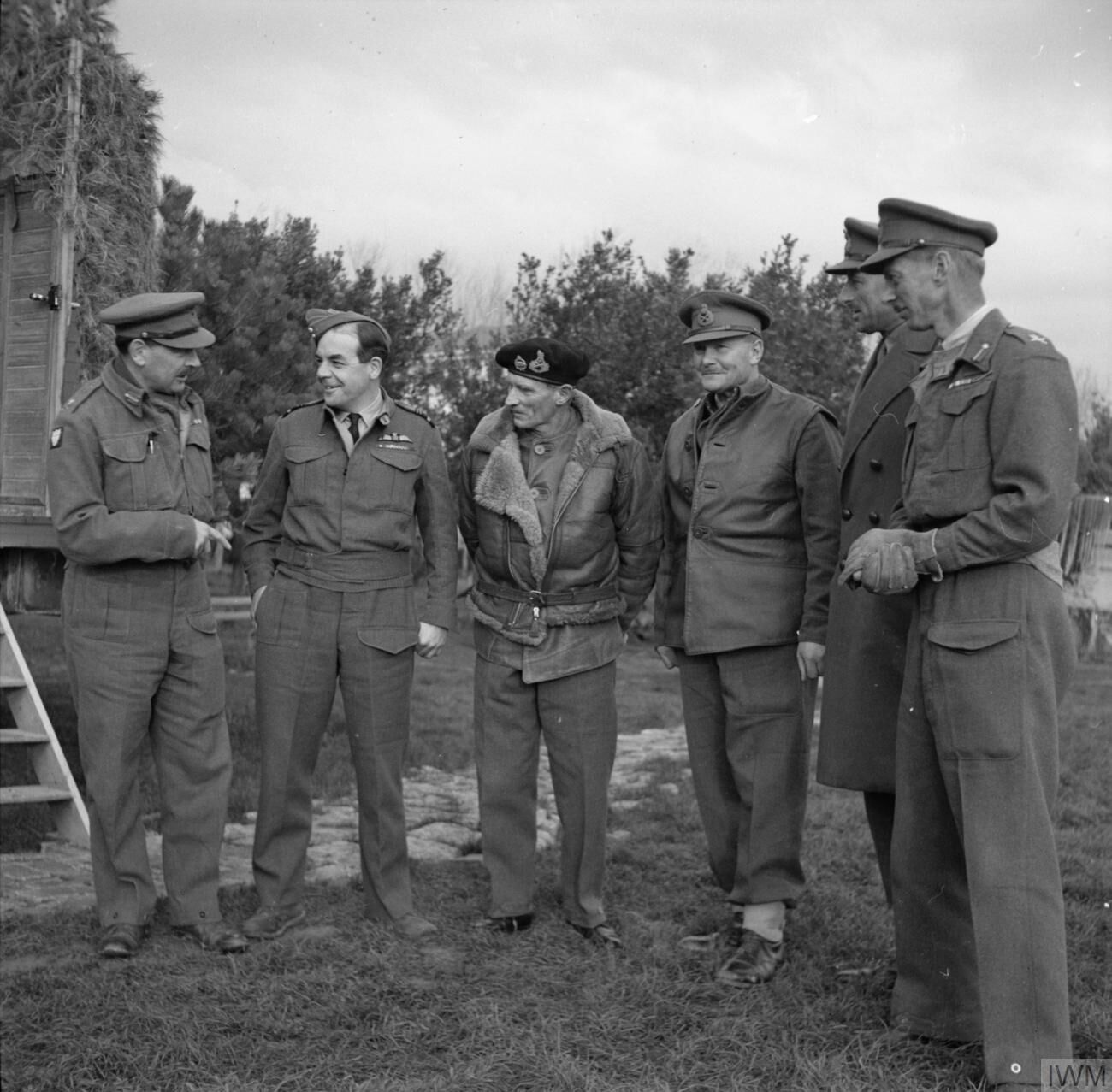
General Sir Bernard Montgomery with his senior officers at Eighth Army Headquarters at Vasto, Italy, 1943. From left to right, Freddie de Guingand, Harry Broadhurst, Montgomery, Sir Bernard Freyberg, Charles Allfrey and Miles Dempsey.

In late 1942, he was posted to the Middle East and became Senior Air Staff Officer (SASO) to Air Vice Marshal Arthur Coningham, commander of the Desert Air Force (DAF). Broadhurst came into conflict with Coningham over the use and objectives of the Desert Air Force. Broadhurst took command of the DAF in January 1943, becoming (at the age of 38) the youngest (until Air Commodore Don Bennett was so promoted on 6 December 1943 at the age of 33) air vice marshal in the Royal Air Force. He quickly perfected the way he perceived fighter aircraft ought to be employed as ground support fighter-bombers. His fighter squadrons were trained intensively to strafe and bomb German and Italian vehicles, tanks, transport and communication lines. This aerial cover of the 8th Army won the approval and appreciation of General Bernard Montgomery and would form the basis of the ground attack principles used during the D-Day landings and beyond.

Broadhurst's enthusiastic backing of the Army and his frank opinions did not always go down well with his superiors in the RAF. He returned to the UK in 1944 to command No. 83 Group, part of 2nd Tactical Air Force. In September 1945, he became Air Officer Administration at RAF Fighter Command.

== Postwar period ==
In August 1946, Broadhurst was made Air Officer Commanding No. 61 Group and in 1949, attended the Imperial Defence College. After promotion to air vice marshal again in July 1949, he became Assistant Chief of the Air Staff (Operations) in April 1952 and then Commander-in-Chief of Second Tactical Air Force in December 1953 in the rank of air marshal.

Broadhurst was appointed Air Officer Commander-in-Chief Bomber Command in January 1956. In 1956, at the peak of Broadhurst's career as Commander in Chief of RAF Bomber Command, his reputation suffered following a fatal accident to an Avro Vulcan. Broadhurst took aircraft XA897, the first Vulcan delivered to the RAF, and a full Vulcan crew, on a round-the-world tour. On return to the UK, Broadhurst was to land at London Heathrow Airport, a civil airport, to complete the successful tour before the assembled aviation media. However, the weather at Heathrow was poor and RAF aircraft were not equipped to use the Instrument Landing System installed at Heathrow and other civil airports so a Ground-controlled approach (GCA) was carried out. XA897 struck the ground about 2,000 feet short of the runway just as power was applied. XA897 was damaged by the initial impact but rose back in the air. The pilot, Squadron Leader D.R. "Podge" Howard, and Broadhurst, who was occupying the co-pilot seat, both ejected from the aircraft and survived. The aircraft again hit the ground and broke up. The Vulcan had only two ejection seats, for the pilot and co-pilot. The other four occupants on XA897, including Howard's usual co-pilot, died in the accident.

In his book The Hidden Truth Maurice Hamlin, a former member of the RAF on duty the day of the crash, claims that Broadhurst ignored three direct orders to divert away from Heathrow due to the poor weather conditions (noting other aircraft had already been diverted). Pilots, he goes on to say, cannot ignore these orders but Hamlin believes that Broadhurst continued to attempt to land due to the waiting press and dignitaries. He further claims a fifty-year D-Notice was placed on the incident (that has now expired).

The AAIB inquiry concluded that the inherent lag in the system of issuing of instructions by the ground controller combined with the Vulcan's normal higher than usual rate-of-descent in comparison with the types of aircraft normally handled by Heathrow's controllers, allowed the aircraft to descend below a safe height before corrective instructions could be issued and complied-with. Subsequently, the Vulcan later became one of the first aircraft qualified for full autoland.

Broadhurst was promoted to Air Chief Marshal in February 1957, and in 1959 he became Commander, Allied Air Forces Central Europe, until March 1961, when he retired from the RAF.

== Later life ==
After retiring, Broadhurst was appointed managing director of Avro Aircraft. In 1965, he became managing director of Hawker Siddeley Aviation Ltd., and in 1968 a Director of the Hawker Siddeley Group Limited, retiring in 1976. He died on 29 August 1995.

Military offices
Preceded by Arthur Coningham	AOC Air HQ Western Desert; Post retitled AOC Desert Air Force on 10 July 1943; 1943–1944	Succeeded by William Dickson
Preceded by William Dickson	AOC No. 83 Group; 1944–1945	Succeeded by Thomas Traill
Preceded by Sir Robert Foster	C-in-C Second Tactical Air Force; 1953–1956	Succeeded by The Earl of Bandon
Preceded by Sir George Mills	C-in-C Bomber Command; 1956–1959	Succeeded by Sir Kenneth Cross
Preceded by Sir George Mills	C-in-C Allied Air Forces Central Europe; 1959–1961	Succeeded by The Earl of Bandon
