= Northwest African Coastal Air Force =

The Northwest African Coastal Air Force (NACAF) was a specialized functional command of the combined Northwest African Air Forces. The Mediterranean Air Command (MAC) oversaw the combined air forces until superseded by the MAAF.

The NACAF had responsibility for air defense of North Africa, sea/air reconnaissance, antisubmarine air operations, air protection of Allied shipping, and air interdiction of enemy shipping. The components of NACAF at the time of the Allied invasion of Sicily (Operation Husky) on July 10, 1943 are illustrated below.

== Order of Battle ==
Northwest African Coastal Air Force
Air Vice-Marshal Sir Hugh Lloyd
Order of Battle, July 10, 1943

^No. 242 Group Air Commodore Kenneth Cross	British Units	American Units
No. 323 Wing No. 73 Squadron, Spitfire; No. 255 Squadron, Beaufighter; No. II/5 Escadre (French), P-40; No. II/7 Escadre (French), Spitfire; Air Sea Rescue Units: No. 283 Squadron, Walrus; No. 284 Squadron, Walrus	RAF Units No. 13 Squadron, Blenheim; No. 614 Squadron, Blenheim; No. 36 Squadron, Wellington; No. 253 Squadron, Hurricane; No. 274 Squadron Hurricane; No. 313 Squadron, Hurricane; No. 500 Squadron, Hudson; No. 608 Squadron, Hudson; No. 1575 Flight, Halifax, Ventura	52nd Fighter Group; Lieutenant Colonel James Coward 2nd Squadron, Spitfire; 4th Squadron, Spitfire; 5th Squadron, Spitfire 414th Night Fighter Squadron, Beaufighter; Major Arden Cowgill; 415th Night Fighter Squadron, Beaufighter; Captain Gordon Timmons
No. 328 Wing No. 14 Squadron, B-26 Marauder; No. 39 Squadron, Beaufort; No. 47 Squadron, Beaufort; No. 144 Squadron, Beaufighter; No. 52 Squadron Baltimore; No. 221 Squadron (Det.), Wellington; No. 458 Squadron (RAAF), Wellington	Royal Navy Fleet Air Arm Units; Torpedo Spotter Reconnaissance No. 813 Squadron (Det.), Swordfish; No. 820 Squadron, Albacore c No. 821 Squadron, Albacore n No. 826 Squadron, Albacore r No. 828 Squadron, Albacore r	81st Fighter Group; Lieutenant Colonel Michael Gordon Oran, Algeria Sector: 92nd Squadron, P-39 Airacobra; 1st Air Defense Wing: 91st Squadron, P-39 Airacobra; 93rd Squadron, P-39 Airacobra
Information in table taken from: 1) Participation of the Ninth & Twelfth Air Forces in the Sicilian; Campaign, Army Air Forces Historical; Study No. 37, Army Air Forces; Historical Office Headquarters, Maxwell AFB, Alabama, 1945.	Bone, Algeria Sector: No. 32 Squadron, Hurricane; No. 87 Squadron, Hurricane; No. 219 Squadron, Beaufighter	350th Fighter Group; Lieutenant Colonel Marvin McNickle 345th Squadron, P-39 Airacobra; 346th Squadron, P-39 Airacobra; 347th Squadron, P-39 Airacobra
2) Maurer, Maurer, Air Force Combat Units Of World War II, Office of Air Force History, Maxwell AFB, Alabama, 1983.	2nd Air Defense Wing: No. 153 Squadron, Beaufighter	480th Antisubmarine Group; Colonel Jack Roberts 1st Squadron, B-24 Liberator; 2nd Squadron, B-24 Liberator

Notes:
^No. 242 Group was originally a part of the Northwest African Tactical Air Force (NATAF) but later transferred to NACAF.
The 1st and 2nd Antisubmarine Squadrons were assigned to NACAF for administration and placed under the operational control of United States Navy Fleet Air Wing 15 of the Moroccan Sea Frontier commanded by Rear Admiral Frank J. Lowry.
No. 144 Squadron was attached from the United Kingdom.
Air Ministry was asked to provide two additional Wellington squadrons.
An Africa-based RAF Hudson of No. 608 Squadron was the first aircraft to sink a U-boat using rockets.

== See also ==
- List of Royal Air Force commands
