= Hugh Pughe Lloyd =

Royal Air Force Air Chief Marshal (1894-1981)

Sir Hugh Lloyd
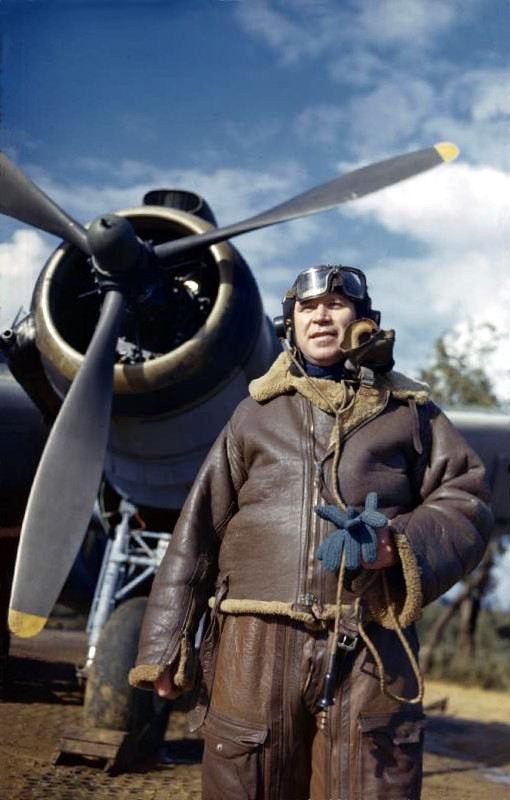
- Air Vice Marshal Lloyd, AOC Mediterranean Allied Coastal Air Forces, stands beside the Bristol Beaufighter in which he flew to Britain, 18 March 1944
- Born: 12 December 1894; Leigh, Worcestershire, England
- Died: 14 July 1981 (aged 86)
- Military career
- Allegiance: United Kingdom
- Branch: British Army (1915–18); Royal Air Force (1918–53)
- Service years: 1915–1953
- Rank: Air Chief Marshal
- Commands: Bomber Command (1950–53); Far East Air Force (1947–49); Tiger Force (1945); Mediterranean Allied Coastal Air Force (1943–44); Northwest African Coastal Air Force (1943); No. 201 Group RAF (1942); AHQ Malta (1941–42); RAF Marham (1939); No. 9 Squadron RAF (1939)
- Conflicts: First World War; Second World War
- Awards: Knight Grand Cross of the Order of the British Empire; Knight Commander of the Order of the Bath; Military Cross; Distinguished Flying Cross; Mentioned in Despatches; Officer of the Legion of Honour (France); Croix de Guerre (France); Officer of the Legion of Merit (United States)

Air Chief Marshal Sir Hugh Pughe Lloyd, GBE, KCB, MC, DFC (12 December 1894 – 14 July 1981) was a senior Royal Air Force commander.

== RAF career ==
Lloyd joined the Royal Engineers as a sapper in 1915 during the First World War: he was wounded in action three times before enlisting as a cadet in the Royal Flying Corps in 1917 and joining No. 52 Squadron, flying the RE.8 on army co-operation missions. After the war, he remained with the recently formed Royal Air Force on a permanent commission.

In January 1939, Lloyd became Officer Commanding No. 9 Squadron, equipped with Wellingtons. Later in 1939, with the Second World War under way, he was promoted to group captain and given command of RAF Marham. His stay at RAF Marham was brief and in November he was appointed to the staff of No. 3 Group and, in May 1940, he became Senior Air Staff Officer at No. 2 Group.

On 1 June 1941, Lloyd was appointed Air Officer Commanding in Malta, with the difficult task of protecting the island from German and Italian air attacks as well as attacking Axis shipping delivering supplies to Erwin Rommel's Afrika Korps in North Africa. However, his lack of knowledge of fighter tactics and the dominance of the Messerschmitt Bf 109F against the outdated Hawker Hurricane, prolonged the Siege of Malta. When Generalfeldmarschall Albert Kesselring was appointed to lead the Axis air-offensive from December 1941, RAF Command at last reacted. After installing a fighter control room similar to those in the United Kingdom, from April 1942 they assigned the island two squadrons of Supermarine Spitfires totaling 47 aircraft, which led later that year to the Allies moving to an offensive campaign.

Lloyd was assigned to RAF headquarters in the Middle East as Senior Air Staff Officer in 1942 and commanded the Northwest African Coastal Air Force and then the Mediterranean Allied Coastal Air Force in 1943. His role there was to carry out harrying of enemy transport by land and sea. In November 1944, he was appointed commander designate of Tiger Force, a Commonwealth heavy bomber force which was intended to join the air offensive against Japan but was disbanded shortly after the nuclear bombings of Hiroshima and Nagasaki effectively ended the war.

== Postwar years ==
After two years as senior instructor at the Imperial Defence College, Lloyd was made Air Officer Commanding Air Command Far East, later retitled Far East Air Force.

In February 1950, he became Air Officer Commanding-in-Chief Bomber Command.

He retired in June 1953. Following his retirement he set up a pig farm at Peterley, near Great Missenden.

Lloyd was President of the London Welsh Trust, which runs the London Welsh Centre, from 1962 until 1964.

Military offices
Preceded by Sir George Pirie	AOC-in-C Air Command Far East; Redesignated AOC-in-C Far East Air Force from 1 June 1949 onwards 1947–1949	Succeeded by Sir Francis Fogarty
Preceded by Sir Aubrey Ellwood	Commander-in-Chief Bomber Command; 1950–1953	Succeeded by Sir George Mills
