= Arthur Coningham (RAF officer) =

Royal Air Force Air Marshal (1895–1948)

Air Marshal Sir Arthur Coningham KCB KBE DSO MC DFC AFC
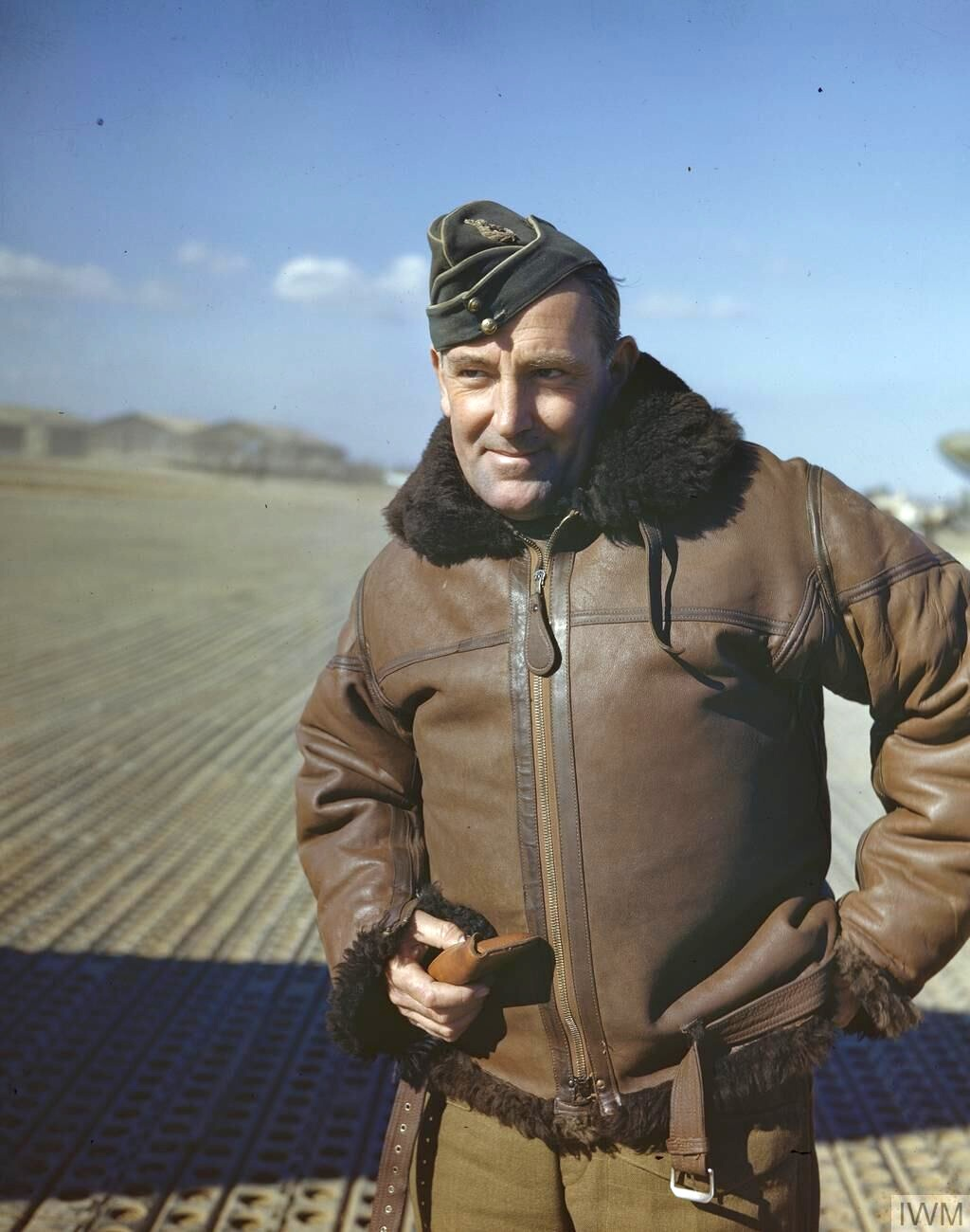
- Coningham in 1944
- Born: 19 January 1895; Brisbane, Australia
- Died: presumably 30 January 1948 (aged 53)
- Military career
- Allegiance: New Zealand (1914–1916); United Kingdom (1916–1947)
- Branch: New Zealand Expeditionary Force; Royal Air Force
- Service years: 1914–1947
- Rank: Air Marshal
- Nickname: 'Mary'
- Commands: Flying Training Command (1945–1947); 2nd Tactical Air Force (1944–1945); North African Tactical Air Force (1943–1944); Air HQ Western Desert (1941–1942); No. 204 Group (1941); No. 4 Group (1939–41); RAF Calshot (1937–1939); No. 55 Squadron (1923–1924); No. 92 Squadron (1918–1919)
- Conflicts: First World War; Gallipoli campaign; Western Front; Battle of Amiens; Second World War; North African campaign; Western Desert campaign; First Battle of El Alamein; Second Battle of El Alamein; Italian campaign; North West Europe campaign; Normandy campaign
- Awards: Knight Commander of the Order of the Bath; Knight Commander of the Order of the British Empire; Distinguished Service Order; Military Cross; Distinguished Flying Cross; Air Force Cross; Mentioned in Despatches (4); Knight of the Legion of Honour (France); Croix de guerre (France); Chief Commander of the Legion of Merit (United States); Distinguished Service Medal (United States); Grand Officer of the Order of Leopold II (Belgium); Croix de guerre (Belgium); Grand Cross of the Order of the Phoenix (Greece); Knight Grand Cross of the Order of Orange-Nassau (Netherlands)

Air Marshal Sir Arthur Coningham, KCB, KBE, DSO, MC, DFC, AFC (19 January 1895 – presumably 30 January 1948), nicknamed "Mary", was an Australian-born senior officer in the Royal Air Force (RAF). During the First World War, he was at Gallipoli with the New Zealand Expeditionary Force, was discharged in New Zealand as medically unfit for active service, and journeyed to Britain at his own expense to join the Royal Flying Corps, where he became a flying ace. Coningham was later a senior Royal Air Force commander during the Second World War, as Air Officer Commanding-in-Chief 2nd Tactical Air Force and subsequently the Air Officer Commanding-in-Chief Flying Training Command.

Coningham is chiefly remembered as the person most responsible for the development of forward air control parties directing close air support, which he developed as commander of the Western Desert Air Force between 1941 and 1943, and as commander of the tactical air forces in the Normandy campaign in 1944. However, he is frequently lauded as the "architect of modern air power doctrine regarding tactical air operations," based on three principles: necessity of air superiority as first priority, centralised command of air operations co-equal with ground leadership, and innovative tactics in support of ground operations.

On 30 January 1948, he disappeared along with all the other passengers and crew of the airliner G-AHNP Star Tiger when it vanished without a trace somewhere off the eastern coast of the United States.

== Early life ==
Coningham was born in Brisbane, Queensland, on 19 January 1895. His early life was one that made him learn to be adaptable. His father, also Arthur Coningham, was noted for playing Test cricket, but was by disposition a con man who was exposed in court for fabricating legal evidence in a trial designed to extort a Catholic priest, Denis Francis O'Haran, secretary to the Catholic Archbishop of Sydney. The resulting scandal drove the older Arthur Coningham to remove the Coningham family to New Zealand while Coningham was still young. The change of scene to New Zealand did not change the father's modus operandi; he spent six months imprisoned there for fraud.

Coningham was resilient enough and sufficiently motivated to win a scholarship to Wellington College. Although Coningham had won a scholarship, he was not an academic star. However, he was athletic and an outdoorsman, with expertise in horsemanship and with firearms.

His parents divorced when he was seventeen; grounds were his father's infidelity. Arthur Coningham was maturely assured enough to remark, "Look here, Coningham, you may be my father, but I am ashamed of you." The comment reflects Coningham's persona; he was abstemious by nature, being a non-smoker, near teetotaler and impatient with obscene language.

== Military career ==
=== First World War service ===
Coningham volunteered for service in the New Zealand Expeditionary Force in August 1914, initially seeing service in the conquest of German Samoa. He then served in Egypt and Somaliland as a trooper in the Canterbury Mounted Rifle Regiment, but developed typhoid fever and was invalided out of service in March 1916. In April, however, he travelled to Britain and volunteered for the Royal Flying Corps.

Posted to 32 Squadron on 19 December 1916 after completing his flying instruction, Coningham flew numerous patrols between 5 January and 30 July 1917, when he was wounded during an aerial combat and invalided back to Britain. During the Battle of Arras, 32 Squadron undertook systematic strafing of German infantry and lines of communication, particularly suited for the Airco DH.2 machines they operated. He returned to France promoted to the rank of Major and in command of 92 Squadron on 1 July 1918 at the age of 23. On 11 August he was wounded again in a particularly intense air combat, but remained in France and resumed flying almost immediately. Through to the end of the war, Coningham's Royal Aircraft Factory S.E.5s conducted bombing and strafing attacks against German aerodromes, troops, gun positions and transport.

In 11 months at the front he engaged in 176 patrols over enemy lines, was credited with the personal destruction of nine enemy aircraft and shared in the destruction of three others with Evander Shapard, Frank Billinge and Arthur Randell. He was also credited with seven victories for having driven down an enemy machine out of control. Coningham emerged from the war with two awards, a Distinguished Service Order and a Military Cross, both earned during his time with 32 Squadron. During that time he had also acquired the nickname "Mary," a corruption of "Maori" as a play on his earlier life in New Zealand.

=== Inter-war years ===
After the end of the First World War, Coningham remained in the Royal Air Force (RAF), initially remaining as Officer Commanding 92 Squadron. During the early 1920s he served as a technical and flying instructor before being posted to 55 Squadron flying Airco DH.9As out of Mosul in Iraq. In the summer of 1923 Coningham was promoted to squadron leader and appointed as the Officer Commanding of 55 Squadron. From early 1924 to early 1926 Coningham carried out staff officer duties, first at the headquarters of Egyptian Group and then at the headquarters of RAF Middle East.

While posted at Egypt Group, Coningham was assigned to lead a detachment of three DH.9As of 47 Squadron on a flight of 3,000 miles (4,800 kilometres) cross country to introduce the first aircraft to Nigeria while undertaking "a training exercise on an extended scale... using ordinary service equipment." Leaving Helwan near Cairo on the morning of 27 October 1925, the three aircraft reached Kano, Nigeria without serious incident on 1 November. The return trip, retracing their outward route, began early on 12 November and marked the first trip across Africa by air from west to east. They completed the estimated journey of 6,500 mi (10,500 km) in 80 hours of actual flying time, flying on 16 of the 24 days of the mission, all without major difficulties. Coningham received an award of the Air Force Cross for the achievement.

After further service at the RAF College, Cranwell and the Central Flying School, Coningham was promoted to wing commander in 1931. The next year he was sent to the Sudan as the senior RAF officer.

On his return to Great Britain in 1935 he took up staff duties in Coastal Area/Coastal Command before being promoted to group captain on 1 January 1937 and serving as the Senior Air Staff Officer at the headquarters of No. 17 (Training) Group. From 1937 to 1939, Coningham was the Officer Commanding RAF Calshot, a flying boat base.

=== Second World War service ===
Coningham began the war as an air commodore commanding Bomber Command's 4 Group, which he led for two years including the first year of the bombing offensive against Germany. His group was small, seldom numbering more than 60 air crews total in the first part of the war, and unlike the rest of Bomber Command conducted its operations at night. Consequently, nearly all of the missions of its Whitley bombers before 19/20 March 1940 were for the delivery of propaganda leaflets over German territory against comparatively ineffective defences. During the remainder of 1940, 4 Group attacked targets in Italy until these were allotted to 3 Group in December, and targets in the Ruhr, all of small scale and causing little damage. Coningham in September received promotion to air vice-marshal. In November, area bombing began, again on a small scale, and continued throughout the winter. 4 Group was just beginning to expand and convert its equipment to Handley Page Halifax bombers when Coningham was transferred.

In July 1941 he was called to Egypt by Air Marshal Arthur Tedder, head of RAF Middle East Command, to take over 204 Group from Air Vice-Marshal Raymond Collishaw. Two months later, to match its growing size and its status with the newly formed Eighth Army, the group was transformed into the Western Desert Air Force. Coningham inherited a poorly functioning situation, where the RAF was almost totally failing to support ground troops. He promptly delegated out technical duties to those he trusted and did not micromanage them; however, he held his subordinates strictly responsible for achieving the results he wanted. Any mistakes by his underlings that resulted in fatalities to friendly troops were grounds for dismissal by Coningham.

Faced with equipment shortages, a hostile desert environment, and superior enemy planes, Coningham's management system, through judicious deployment of his squadrons, gradually achieved air superiority in the North African campaign. In particular, Coningham developed the use of fighter-bombers, able to fight as fighter planes in the air or in bombing and strafing attacks of enemy ground targets. Coningham developed an efficient ground support system to keep planes flying, and a command and control system to allow ground observers to radio in air attacks. Coningham's Western Desert Air Force, in continuous air attacks of enemy ground targets, was instrumental in stopping the enemy offensive at El Alamein in July 1942. Coningham formed a close relationship with the new Eighth Army commander, General Bernard Montgomery. Montgomery and Coningham recognised the importance of joint operations. The air power doctrine devised by Coningham is the basis of modern joint operations doctrine. The dominance of the Allied air force was a critical factor in the British victory at the Second Battle of El Alamein in November 1942. Coningham's doctrine of tactical air power would reach its fruition in early 1943, when RAF and United States Army Air Force (USAAF) fighter-bombers and bombers attacked enemy land forces.

Coningham's doctrine was fundamental. He stated that the greatest attribute of air power was its ability to speedily concentrate its force. It followed that its command must also be concentrated. Tactical air power had to be closely coordinated with the ground forces, but the army could not command it. He stated as much in a pamphlet that was widely distributed, to every ranking officer in North Africa, so that they would know what to expect. The pamphlet included Coningham's priorities for success in use of tactical air power. First, gain air superiority. Second, use the air superiority gained to interdict enemy reinforcements of men and materiel to isolate the battlefield. Third, combine air attacks with ground assaults on the front lines.

Coningham was knighted after El Alamein and continued to provide tactical air support for the Eighth Army until they occupied Tripoli in January 1943. Later in 1943 Coningham was promoted to Air Marshal and directed tactical air force operations in the Allied invasion of Sicily and Italy as commander of the Northwest African Tactical Air Force.

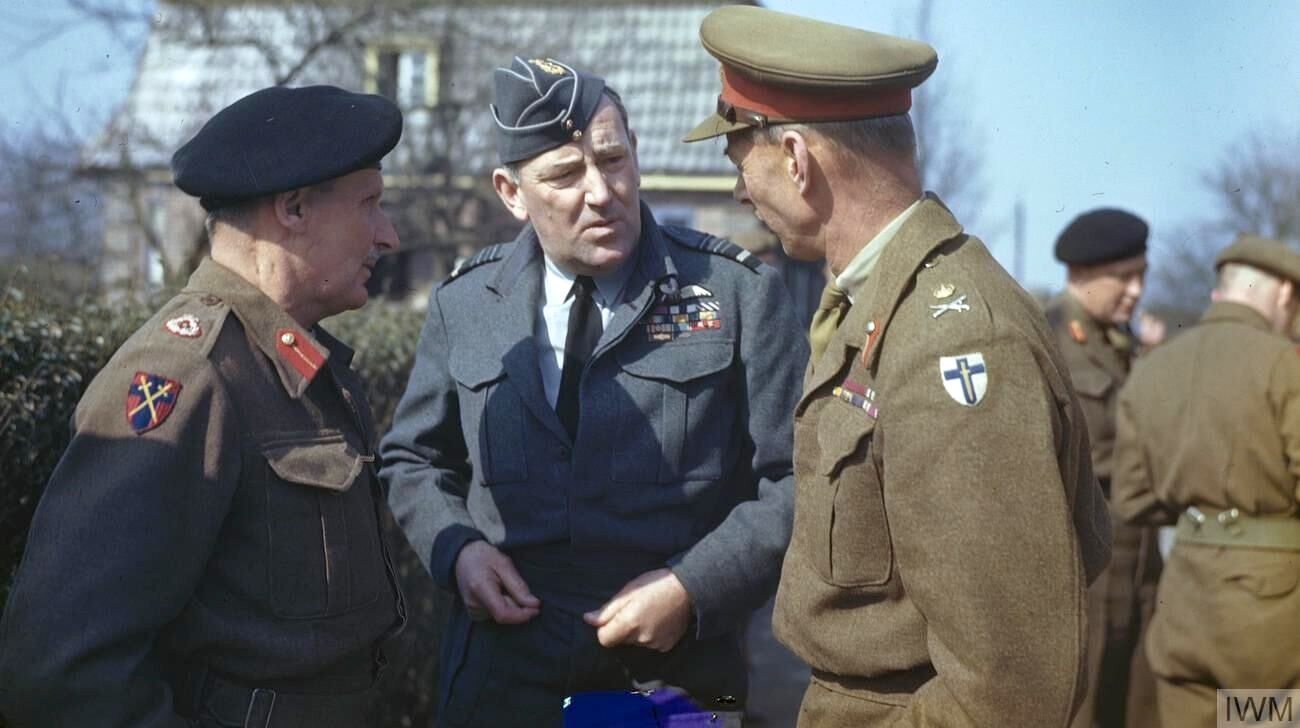
Coningham (centre) with Montgomery (left) and Dempsey (right) prior to the British crossing of the Rhine

As the leading exponent of tactical air warfare, Coningham was the obvious choice to command 2nd Tactical Air Force in the North-West European campaign under Air Marshal Trafford Leigh-Mallory, commanding the Allied Expeditionary Air Forces, and in January 1944 he was recalled to Britain where he helped plan air support for the Normandy landings. His relationship with Montgomery deteriorated markedly after the landings took place. The two often clashed when Montgomery regularly tried to bypass Coningham, who was the designated point of contact for air support requests, and deal directly with Leigh-Mallory. At the end of June, Montgomery lobbied Tedder, now deputy commander to U.S. General Dwight D. Eisenhower at Supreme Allied Headquarters, for Coningham's removal after he criticised the army for tardiness in capturing Caen in order to make available airfields for tactical aircraft. Tedder, however, advised Eisenhower that such removal would be "a disaster" and the criticism valid. In August 1944 Montgomery wrote to Alan Brooke that "Coningham is violently anti-army and despised by all soldiers; my army commanders mistrust him and never want to see him." However it was Montgomery who received a rebuke from Eisenhower, while Leigh-Mallory's headquarters was dissolved in October as an unnecessary command echelon.

He remained commander of the 2nd Tactical Air Force until July 1945, when he was replaced by Air Chief Marshal Sir Sholto Douglas and appointed head of Flying Training Command.

A keen yachtsman, in 1947 he was appointed Commodore of the RAF Yacht Club then based at Calshot; however he later oversaw the move to the current location at Hamble.

== Retirement and disappearance ==
In a ceremony at the airport in Frankfurt, Germany, President Harry S. Truman (third from left) presents the Army Distinguished Service Medal to (opposite the President, L to R:) General H. D. G. Crerar, Canadian Army, Air Marshal Sir Arthur Coningham, Air Marshal Sir James Robb, and Major General Sir F. W. Guingand. President Truman is in Frankfort to inspect U. S. troops during a break in the Potsdam Conference.

Viewing his appointment to Air Training Command as a demotion, Coningham chose to retire on 1 August 1947 after 30 years of commissioned service. He disappeared on 30 January 1948 when the airliner G-AHNP Star Tiger in which he was travelling to Bermuda was lost off the east coast of the United States.

== Personal life ==
In 1930 he met at Cowes and soon began a relationship with Nancy Muriel (née Brooks) known as "Nan", the wife of wealthy businessman Sir Howard Frank, who was 31 years her senior.

Following the sudden death of her husband on 10 January 1932 Nan and Coningham were married on 11 July 1932 by an RAF chaplain in the station church at Aboukir, Alexandria., The witnesses were Coningham's friends Air Vice-Marshal Cyril Newall and his wife. The couple had a daughter Jane-Mari, who was born on 5 May 1934.

Nan brought to the marriage her two sons by Frank, Howard Frederick, born on 5 April 1923 and Robert John, born on 16 March 1925. Howard was killed on 11 September 1944 while serving as a tank commander in the Guards Armoured Division.

== In popular culture ==
In the film Patton, Coningham is played by John Barrie. During his scene, in which General George S Patton is complaining about lack of air cover for American troops, Sir Arthur (Tedder) confirms to Patton that he will see no more German planes. As he has completed his sentence, German planes strafe the compound. Although a similar scene happened in real life; in actuality Coningham was not present; Patton was talking to General Carl Spaatz and Air Chief Marshal Arthur Tedder at the time of the strafing.

== See also ==
- List of people who disappeared mysteriously at sea

== Sources ==
- Budiansky, Stephen (2003). Air Power. London: Viking. ISBN 0670912514.
- Classen, Adam (2017). Fearless: The Extraordinary Untold Story of New Zealand's Great War Airmen. Auckland: Massey University Press. ISBN 9780994140784.
- Orange, Vincent (1992) [1990]. Coningham: A Biography of Air Marshal Sir Arthur Coningham, KCB, CBE, DSO, MC, DFC, AFC (PDF). Washington D.C.: Center for Air Force History. ISBN 0-413-14580-8. Original publisher: Methuen, London.
- Orange, Vincent (2008). "From Burn to Bannerman: New Zealand airmen come of age". In Crawford, John; McGibbon, Ian (eds.). New Zealand's Great War: New Zealand, the Allies, and the First World War. Auckland: Exisle Publishing. pp. 333–343. ISBN 9780908988853.
- Shores, Christopher F.; Franks, Norman; Guest, Russell (1990). Above the Trenches: A Complete Record of the Fighter Aces and Units of the British Empire Air Forces 1915–1920. London: Grub Street. ISBN 978-0-948817-19-9.

Military offices
Preceded by Richard Saul	Officer Commanding RAF Calshot; 1937–1939	Unknown
Preceded by Charles Hubert Boulby Blount	Air Officer Commanding No. 4 Group; 1939–1941	Succeeded by Roderick Carr
Preceded by Raymond Collishaw	Air Officer Commanding No. 204 Group; 1941	Group disbanded Raised to command and renamed AHQ Western Desert
New title Formation upgraded from No. 204 Group	Air Officer Commanding Air HQ Western Desert; AOC Air HQ Libya from 20 January to 3 February 1942; 1941–1942	Succeeded by Harry Broadhurst
Preceded by John D'Albiac	Commander-in-Chief Second Tactical Air Force; 1944–1945	Succeeded by Sir Sholto Douglas; As C-in-C British Air Forces of Occupation
Preceded by Sir Philip Babington	Air Officer Commanding-in-Chief Flying Training Command; 1945–1947	Succeeded by Sir Ralph Cochrane
