= List of service commands of the United States Army Air Forces =

List of U.S. Army Air Forces logistical commands during World War II

During World War II, many of the logistical support functions of the United States Army Air Forces were accomplished by a variety of service commands.

These generally were of two types, those subordinate to numbered air forces, which generally carried Roman numerals, and service commands forming part of Air Materiel Command in the Zone of the Interior - the Continental United States.

== Numbered air force service commands ==
- 4th Air Force Service (later, 4th Air Force Base; IV Air Force Base), Fourth Air Force: 1 October 1941 – 31 March 1942
- V Air Force Service Command, Fifth Air Force: 18 June 1943 – 15 June 1944
- V Air Service Area Command, Fifth Air Force: 9 January 1944 – 15 June 1944
- VI Air Force Service Command, Sixth Air Force, undetermined, though circa 1942-44 (included Panama Air Depot at Albrook Army Airfield); supervised 20th Troop Carrier Squadron, circa 1942-December 1944; supervised 72nd Reconnaissance Group, Special, Howard Field, Canal Zone, August–November 1943; supervised 1st Depot Repair Squadron 10 June 1944 - Nov/Dec 1944, Albrook Field, Canal Zone.
- VII Air Force Service Command, previously 7th Air Force Base Command
- VIII Air Force Service Command
- IX Air Force Service Command
- IX Air Service Area Command, assigned to Tenth Air Force, 19 March – 1 July 1948
- X Air Force Service Command, assigned to Tenth Air Force, 1 February – 20 August 1943. Activated 1 May 1942 with headquarters at New Delhi, India. Brigadier General Elmer E. Adler was appointed Commanding Officer. 10 AFSC was redesignated China-Burma-India Air Service Command on 20 August 1943.
- XI Air Force Service Command, a component of Eleventh Air Force, Territory of Alaska, 11 August 1942 – 25 October 1944
- XII Air Force Service Command, later Air Service Command, Mediterranean Theater of Operations
- 14 Air Service Command - see CBI Lineages and History
- XV Air Force Service Command
- XXI Air Force Service Command, assigned to Tenth Air Force, 19 March – 1 July 1948
- Northwest African Air Service Command (allied formation with British)
- The Far East Air Service Command was established on 14 July 1944. It was activated on 18 August 1944 at Brisbane, Australia. It eventually moved its headquarters to Manila on 7 August 1945 having re-located through several intermediate locations. It was redesignated Pacific Air Service Command, U.S. Army, in January 1946, and Far East Air Materiel Command (FEAMCOM) on 1 January 1947.
- others

== Service commands in Air Service Command ==
On 9 March 1942, the Air Service Command now became one of the major AAF commands, with relatively clear lines of responsibility and authority. Four air service area commands (San Antonio, Fairfield, Middletown, and Sacramento?), successors to the maintenance wings (and field service sections, originally activated in 1940?), had been activated in December 1941 to supervise the depots in given geographical areas. The depots, of which there were eleven by April 1942, became the centers of depot control areas, which directed the activities of subdepots within defined geographical limits. Unfortunately, the boundaries of some of the depot control areas overlapped those of air service areas, and since the depots were the real focal points of supply and maintenance activities, the air service areas never attained the status of fully functioning ASC subcommands. The air service areas were disbanded on 1 February 1943, to be succeeded by air depot control area commands, which were simply the eleven former depot control areas under a new name. The elimination of the four air service areas was apparently justified by subsequent operations; according to Maj. Gen. Walter H. Frank, commander of the ASC, the step proved "most beneficial."

In May 1943 the air depot control area commands were redesignated air service commands with appropriate geographical designations, and from then to the end of the war the ASC conducted its operations in the continental United States through its eleven air service commands, each serving a separate geographical area. These air service commands included the Middletown Air Service Command (Olmsted Field, Middletown, Pennsylvania), Mobile ASC, Ogden Air Service Command, Oklahoma City Air Service Command, Rome Air Service Command, Sacramento Air Service Command, the San Antonio Air Service Command, the San Bernardino Air Service Command, Warner Robins Air Service Command, Warner Robins, as well as five-six others. In 1944 the air service commands were redesignated air technical service commands.
