= Air Service Command, Mediterranean Theater of Operations =

United States Army Air Forces logistics formation

- Active: 1942-1945
- Country: United States of America
- Branch: United States Army Air Forces
- Role: Military Logistics
- Part of: Army Air Forces, Mediterranean Theater of Operations
- Engagements: Mediterranean Theater of Operations

Air Service Command, Mediterranean Theater of Operations was a United States Army Air Forces logistics formation. It had its headquarters and an HQ squadron at Naples, Italy. It was originally XII Air Force Service Command, part of Twelfth Air Force, but after 1 January 1944 became AAF Service Command, Mediterranean Theater of Operations. The command was assigned directly to Army Air Forces, Mediterranean Theater of Operations, and controlled the air depots and air sub depots in the Mediterranean Theater of Operations.

It provided theater logistics at the end of the war (a detachment was at Foggia, Italy), and subordinate units included the 302nd Depot Repair Squadron.

The 515th Air Service Group formed part of the command at Pomigliano d'Arco Airfield, Italy, from 28 December 1944 to 1945. The 517th Air Service Group was also part of the command for a time in 1945.

== Lineage ==
- Constituted as XII Air Force Service Command

Activated on 22 August 1942
Redesignated Air Service Command, Mediterranean Theater of Operations on 1 January 1944
Disbanded on 30 November 1945

=== Assignments ===
- Twelfth Air Force, 22 August 1942 (attached to VIII Air Force Service Command September 1942 – ca. December 1942, Northwest African Air Service Command February 1943 – March 1943)
- Army Air Forces, Mediterranean Theater of Operations, 1 January 1944 – October 1945 (attached to Mediterranean Allied Air Forces 1 January 1944 – to end of war in Europe)
- Unknown Oct 1945 – 30 November 1945

=== Stations ===
- MacDill Field, Florida 22 August 1942 – September 1942
- Kew Gardens, London, United Kingdom, September 1942 – November 1942
- Oran, Algeria, December 1942
- Algiers, Algeria, ca. December 1942
- Maison Blanche Airfield, Algeria, ca. March 1943
- Naples, Italy, February 1944 – 30 November 1945

=== Components ===
Included:

Commands

- Casablanca Service Area Command (Provisional) (later 1st Service Area Command (Provisional)), 12 December 1942 – ca. 14 March 1943
- Constantine Service Area Command (Provisional) (later 3d Service Area Command (Provisional)), 14 December 1942 – 14 March 1943
- Oran Service Area Command (Provisional) (later 2d Service Area Command (Provisional)), 12 December 1942 – ca. 14 March 1943
- I Service Area Command (later I Air Service Area Command (Special)), ca. 14 March 1943 – 30 September 1945
- II Service Area Command (later II Air Service Area Command (Special), XV Air Force Service Command), ca. 14 March 1943 – December 1943, January 1944 – 9 September 1945 (detached to Strategic Air Force, Mediterranean Allied Air Forces January 1944 – spring 1945)
- III Service Area Command (later III Air Service Area Command (Special), XII Air Force Service Command), 14 March 1943 – 25 July 1945 (detached to Tactical Air Force, Mediterranean Allied Air Forces January 1944 – spring 1945)

Areas

- Advanced Air Depot Area, October 1943 – December 1943

Depots

- Adriatic Base Depot, unknown
- Air Force General Depot No. 1 (later Oran Intransit Depot, Air Force Sub Depot No. 12), Nov 42 – ca 1 May 1945
- Air Force General Depot No. 2 (later Maison Blanche General Depot, Air Force General Depot No. 4), Nov 42 – 17 October 1944
- Air Force General Depot No. 3 (later Casablanca Sub Depot, Air Force Sub Depot No. 11, Air Force General Depot No. 11), Feb 43 – 21 August 1944
- Air Force General Depot No. 4 (later Air Force General Depot No. 2), Jan 43 – 29 November 1944
- Air Force General Depot No. 5 (later Air Force General Depot No. 1), May 43 – 29 November 1944
- Air Force General Depot No. 6 (later Air Force General Depot No. 3, Air Force Sub Depot No. 31), Aug 43 – 14 July 1944, 19 September 1944 – ca. 31 July 1945
- 51st Troop Carrier Wing, 15–31 August 1945

== See also ==
- List of service commands of the United States Army Air Forces
