= Harold Barton =

Harold Barton may refer to:

- Harold Barton (footballer) (1910–1969), English footballer
- Harold Barton (cricketer) (1882–1970), English cricketer
- Harold Barton (Hawkeye), fictional character

== See also ==
- Harry Barton (disambiguation)
- Harold Bartron (1896–1975), United States Air Force general
