= 915th Air Refueling Squadron =

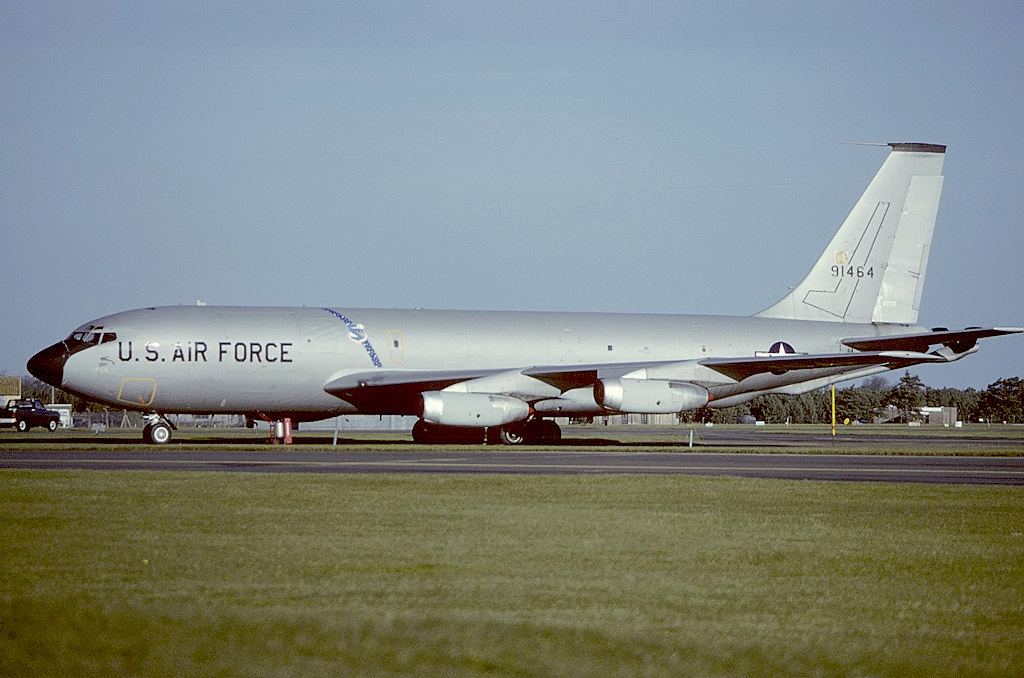
- Boeing KC-135A Stratotanker as flown by the 915th Air Refueling Squadron
- Active: 1940–1943; 1958–1971
- Country: United States
- Branch: United States Air Force
- Role: Air refueling
- Engagements: American Theater of World War II; European Theater of World War II
- Decorations: Air Force Outstanding Unit Award

Insignia
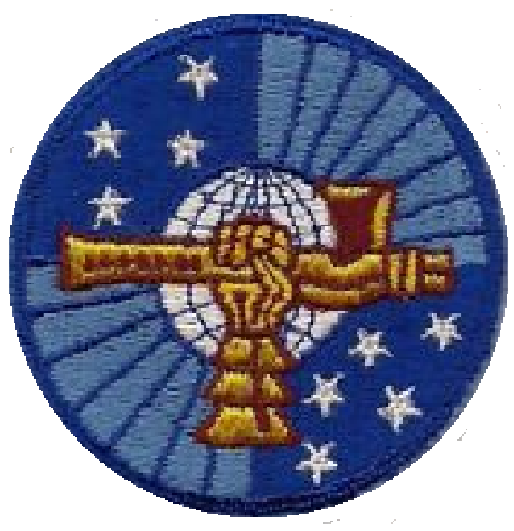
- Patch with 915th Air Refueling Squadron emblem

- 15th Bombardment Squadron emblem (Note: Approved 27 May 1940. Description: On a blue octagon, a thunderbolt terminating in a drop bomb bend-sinisterwise of silver.)

The 915th Air Refueling Squadron is an inactive United States Air Force unit. It was last assigned to the 72d Bombardment Wing at Ramey Air Force Base, Puerto Rico where it was inactivated on 30 June 1971 when the Air Force transferred Ramey to Military Airlift Command.

The squadron was first activated as the 15th Bombardment Squadron in 1940. When the United States entered World War II it engaged in antisubmarine patrols off the Atlantic coast. It was designated the 1st Pursuit Squadron (Night Fighter) and shipped to the European theater to be trained with Royal Air Force Turbinlite fighters, but development of those aircraft terminated and the squadron returned to its original designation. It participated in the first Army Air Forces attack on Occupied Europe before moving to North Africa, where it was disbanded on 1 October 1943.

In 1958 the 915th Air Refueling Squadron was activated and assigned to the 72d Bombardment Wing when the wing converted from Convair B-36 Peacemaker to Boeing B-52 Stratofortress bombers. Until it was inactivated in 1971, its crews stood alert and deployed aircraft to support various contingency operations.

The two squadrons were consolidated into a single unit in 1985 but remained in inactive status.

== History ==
=== World War II ===
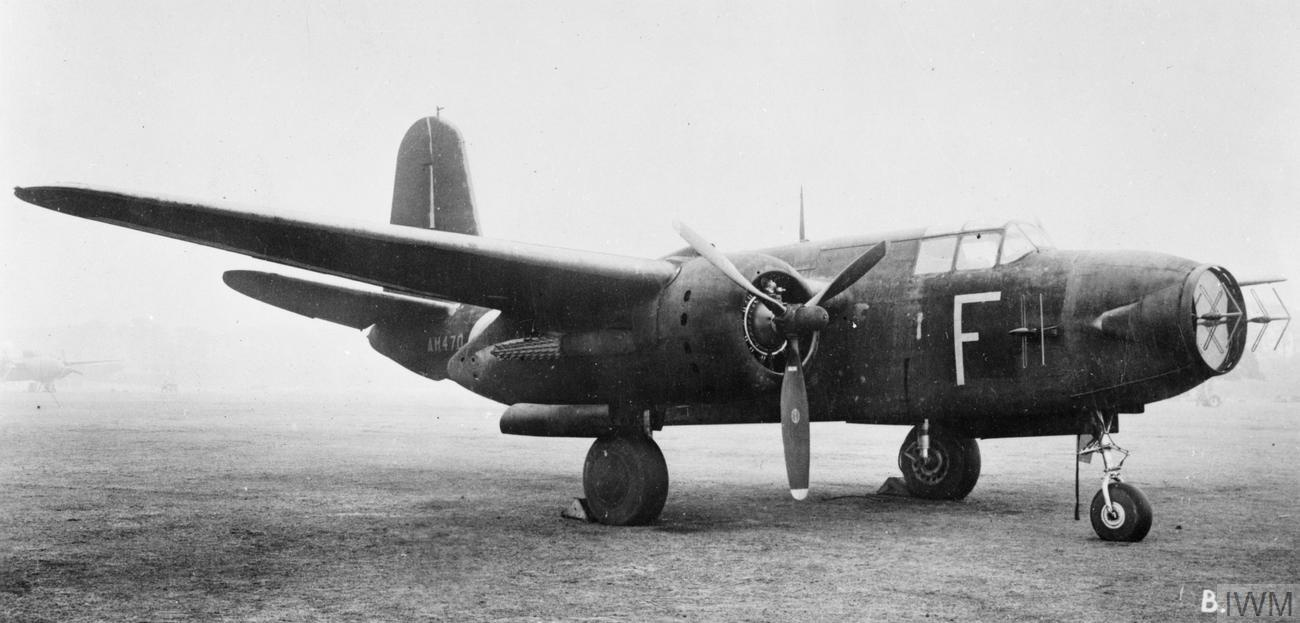
Douglas Havoc II Turbinlite night fighter

The 15th Bombardment Squadron was initially activated as one of the original squadrons of the 27th Bombardment Group at Barksdale Field, Louisiana in 1940. In 1941 the group and squadron began to receive Douglas A-20 Havoc light bombers. As the 27th prepared for shipment to the Philippines in the fall or 1941, the 15th was reassigned to 5th Air Support Command. After the Pearl Harbor attack, the unit moved to Fort Dix Army Air Field, New Jersey and flew antisubmarine patrols over the Atlantic coast.

The squadron returned to Lawson Field, Georgia, where it was redesignated as the 1st Pursuit Squadron (Night Fighter) Although the Air Corps lacked a night fighter capability at the time, the Royal Air Force (RAF) had experimented with a searchlight equipped model of the Havoc as a night fighter, and the intention was for the squadron to move to the United Kingdom and train with Turbinlite equipped Havocs upon arrival.

The squadron shipped to the European Theater from the Boston Port of Embarkation on 17 April 1942 with the first shipment of troops assigned to Eighth Air Force aboard the UK troopship Andes, arriving in the United Kingdom on 11 May. However, while the unit was en route, the Air Corps returned the squadron to its original designation as a light bomber unit, since the RAF had discontinued development of Turbinlite aircraft in favor of aircraft equipped with radar. Upon arrival in England, the unit was attached to VIII Bomber Command, arriving at RAF Grafton Underwood on 12 May, then moving to RAF Molesworth on 9 June. Under Eighth Air Force the airmen flew British Douglas DB-7 Boston III light bomber, receiving their aircraft and training from No. 226 Squadron RAF.

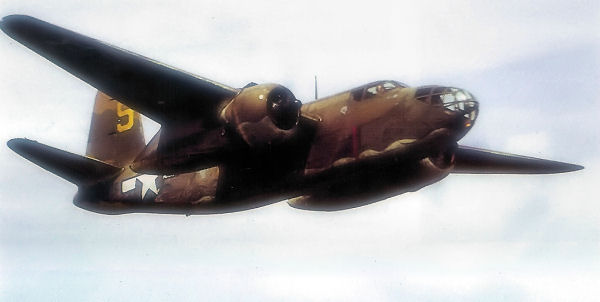
DB-7 Boston that participated in the 4 July 1942 attack on occupied Europe (Note: Aircraft is Douglas DB-7 Boston, RAF Serial AL672.)

After a few weeks of familiarization training with the new aircraft, on 4 July 1942 six American crews from the 15th joined with six RAF crews of 226 Squadron for a low-level attack on four Luftwaffe airfields in the Netherlands, becoming the first United States Army Air Forces unit to bomb targets in Europe. Upon approaching one of the targets, De Kooy Airfield, the aircraft piloted by Capt. Charles Kegelman received a direct hit in its right engine, starting a fire and causing the propeller to separate from the plane. A momentary loss of control resulted in the rear fuselage and right wingtip of the plane striking the ground. Capt. Kegelman jettisoned his bomb load and turned to the coastline, en route he exchanged fire with a flak tower. The engine fire went out and the plane successfully landed at RAF Swanton Morley Two of the 15th's planes did not return from the mission, along with one RAF aircraft. Capt. Kegleman was promoted to Major and awarded the Distinguished Service Cross for his valor on the mission. He was the first Eighth Air Force airman to receive the nation's second highest combat decoration.

The Fourth of July raid had been specifically ordered by General "Hap" Arnold, commander of the AAF, and approved by President Franklin D. Roosevelt, who had promised British Prime Minister Winston Churchill American action against Germany by that date. Arnold believed that the Fourth of July would be an ideal day for the AAF to open its strategic bombing campaign against the Nazis, but General Carl Spaatz, commander of Eighth Air Force, did not have any of his heavy bombardment groups ready for operational missions, and his only fighter unit, the 31st Fighter Group, was just beginning to familiarize itself with its Supermarine Spitfires. Spaatz considered the mission a stunt triggered by pressure in the American press that believed the people of both the United States and Great Britain needed a psychological boost. He noted in his command diary, "The cameramen and newspapermen finally got what they wanted-and everybody seemed contented."

The 15th flew most of its missions from Molesworth in its Bostons, and did not receive AAF Douglas A-20 Havoc aircraft until 5 September. The squadron was transferred to RAF Podington on 15 September where it flew a few missions before being transferred to Twelfth Air Force in October to support Operation Torch, the Allied landings in North Africa.

After two months of combat in North Africa, the squadron was assigned to the Northwest African Training Command where its combat veterans provided advanced training in close air support with A-20s and later North American A-36 Apaches at several airfields throughout 1943. It was disbanded at Nouvion Airfield, Algeria on 1 October 1943 and its crews and aircraft were transferred to the 47th Bombardment Group.

=== Cold War ===
In the fall of 1958, as the 72d Bombardment Wing at Ramey Air Force Base, Puerto Rico began to transition from the Convair B-36 Peacemaker to the Boeing B-52 Stratofortress, Strategic Air Command (SAC) activated the 915th Air Refueling Squadron. Simultaneously, as part of SAC's program to disperse its B-52 bombers over a larger number of bases, making it more difficult for the Soviet Union to knock out the entire fleet with a surprise first strike, two of the wing's three bombardment squadrons were assigned to other bases.

The squadron mission was to provide air refueling to the bombers of its parent wing and other USAF units as directed, including support for tactical fighters during overseas deployments. Shortly after becoming combat ready in 1959, the squadron won the first of several "Golden Boom" awards from Eighth Air Force for its efficiency in performing its refueling mission, and in 1960 the 915th won the Saunders Trophy as the best refueling unit in SAC. Starting in 1960, one third of the squadron's aircraft were maintained on fifteen-minute alert, fully fueled and ready for combat to reduce vulnerability to a Soviet missile strike. This was increased to half the squadron's aircraft in 1962.

In addition to its refueling mission, the unit provided occasional support for tests of intercontinental ballistic missiles using the eastern test range. It periodically deployed planes and crews to Eielson Air Force Base, Alaska, Goose Air Base, Canada and Torrejon Air Base, Spain as part of Tanker Task Forces supporting Operation Chrome Dome. The 915th deployed aircraft and crews to the Western Pacific to support combat operations of deployed SAC units and tactical aircraft over Southeast Asia during the Vietnam War after 1966 as part of the Young Tiger Task Force.

The squadron was inactivated in 1971 along with its parent wing as part of a phaseout of B-52 units that had been announced by Robert S. McNamara, then Secretary of Defense, six years earlier. Ramey was then transferred to Military Airlift Command.

In September 1985, the United States Air Force consolidated the two squadrons into a single unit under the designation 915th Air Refueling Squadron, Heavy, but the squadron has remained inactive since then.

== Lineage ==
15th Bombardment Squadron

- Constituted as the 15th Bombardment Squadron (Light) on 22 December 1939

Activated on 1 February 1940
Redesignated 1st Pursuit Squadron (Night Fighter) on 1 April 1942
Redesignated 15th Bombardment Squadron (Light) on 7 May 1942
Disbanded on 1 October 1943

- Reconstituted on 19 September 1985 and consolidated with the 915th Air Refueling Squadron as the 915th Air Refueling Squadron.

915th Air Refueling Squadron

- Constituted as the 915th Air Refueling Squadron, Heavy on 7 April 1958

Activated on 1 September 1958
Inactivated on 30 June 1971

- Consolidated on 19 September 1985 with the 15th Bombardment Squadron. (remained inactive)

=== Assignments ===
- 27th Bombardment Group, 1 February 1940
- 5th Air Support Command, 14 October 1941 – c. 1942
- VIII Ground Air Support Command (attached to VIII Bomber Command), 14 May 1942
- Twelfth Air Force, 14 September 1942 – 1 October 1943 (attached to Northwest African Training Command after 18 February 1943)
- 72d Bombardment Wing, 1 September 1958 – 30 June 1971

=== Stations ===
- Barksdale Field, Louisiana, 1 February 1940
- Lawson Field, Georgia, 7 October 1940
- Fort Dix AAF, New Jersey, 8 December 1941 (operated from Mitchel Field, until 15 December 1941)
- Lawson Field, Georgia, February 1942 – 18 April 1942
- RAF Grafton Underwood (USAAF Station 106), England, 14 May 1942
- RAF Molesworth (USAAF Station 107), England, 9 June 1942
- RAF Podington (USAAF Station 109), England, 13 September 1942
- Tebessa Airfield, Algeria, 13 November 1942
- Tafaraoui Airfield, Algeria, 10 December 1942
- Youks-les-Bains Airfield, Algeria, 22 December 1942
- Nouvion Airfield, Algeria, February 1943
- Rabat-Salé Airport, French Morocco, May 1943
- Nouvion Airfield, Algeria, 1 October 1943
- Ramey Air Force Base, Puerto Rico, 1 September 1958 – 30 June 1971

=== Aircraft ===
- Curtiss A-18 Shrike, 1940
- Douglas A-20 Havoc, 1941–1942, 1942–1943
- Douglas DB-7 Boston, 1942
- North American A-36 Apache, 1943
- Boeing KC-135A Stratotanker, 1958–1971

=== Awards and campaigns ===
Award streamer	Award	Dates	Notes
	Air Force Outstanding Unit Award	1 April 1960 – 30 June 1961	915th Air Refueling Squadron
	Air Force Outstanding Unit Award	1 July 1968 – 30 June 1969	915th Air Refueling Squadron

Campaign Streamer	Campaign	Dates	Notes
	Antisubmarine	8 December 1941 – Feb 42	15th Bombardment Squadron
	Air Offensive, Europe	4 July 1942 – 1 October 1943	15th Bombardment Squadron
	Tunisia	13 November 1942 – 13 May 1943	15th Bombardment Squadron

== See also ==
- List of United States Air Force air refueling squadrons
- List of A-20 Havoc operators
