= Harry Barton =

Harry Barton may refer to:

- Harry Barton (baseball) (1875–1955), American baseball player
- Harry Barton (architect) (1876–1937), American architect
- Harry Barton (footballer) (1874–1954), English footballer
- Harry Barton (priest) (1898–1968), Archdeacon of Sudbury

== See also ==
- Harold Barton (disambiguation)
- Henry Barton (disambiguation)
