= Twelfth Air Force =

Numbered air force of the United States Air Force

Twelfth Air Force (Air Forces Southern)
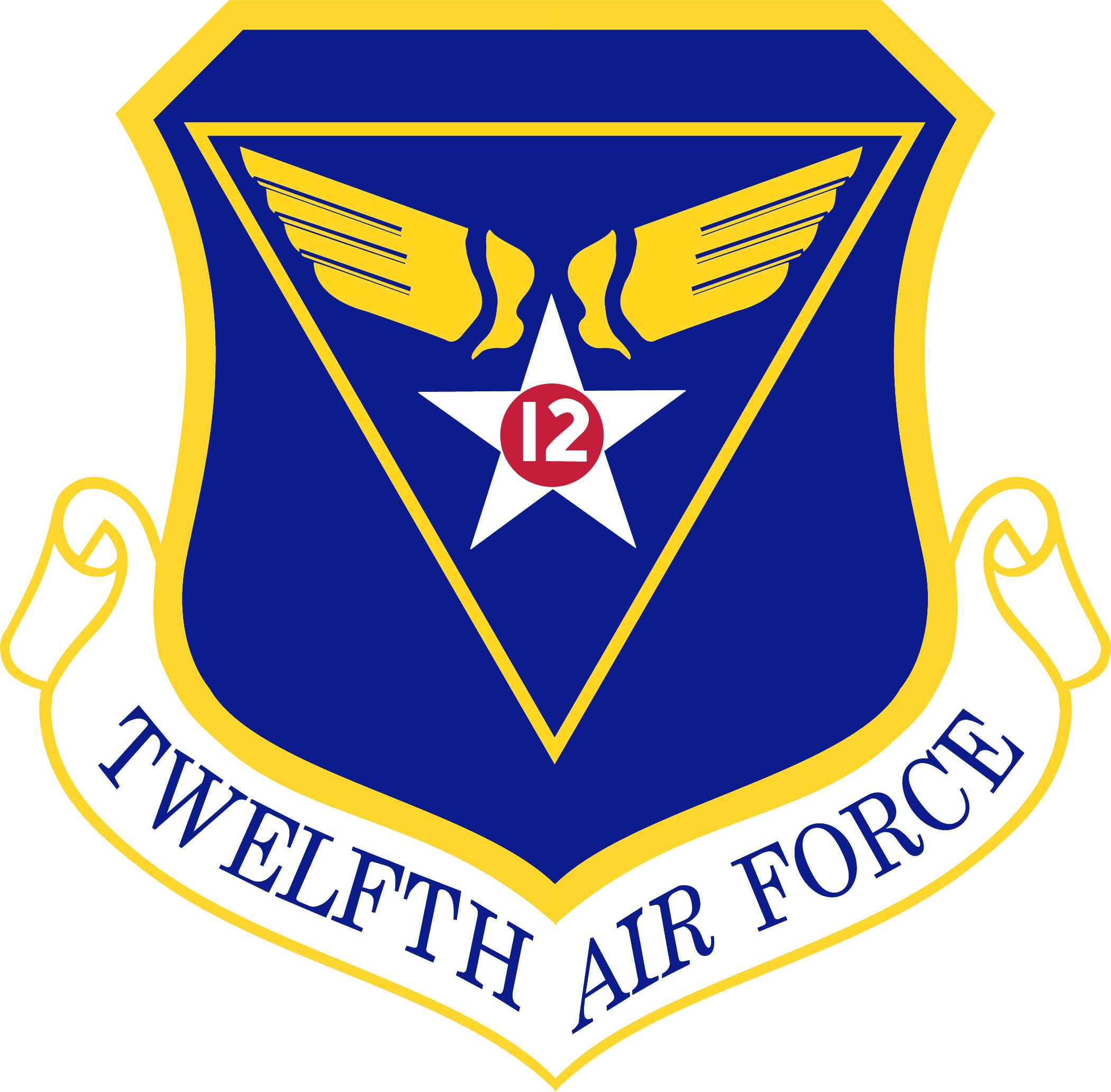
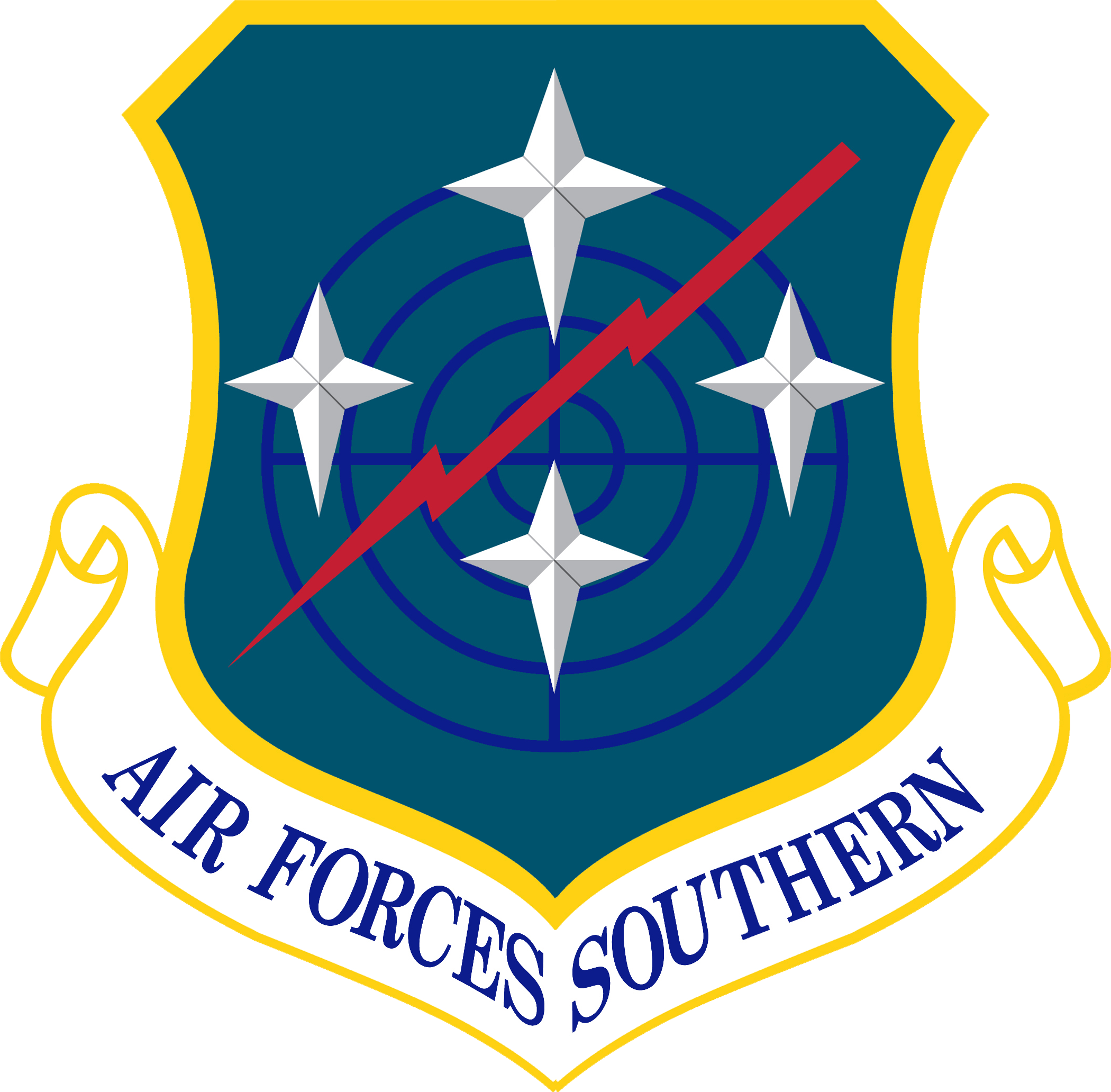
- Shield of the Twelfth Air Force Shield of Air Forces Southern
- Active: 29 February 2008–present (as Twelfth Air Force (Air Forces Southern)); 21 January 1951 – 29 February 2008; 17 May 1946 – 1 July 1950; 20 August 1942 – 31 August 1945 (as Twelfth Air Force) (83 years, 11 months)
- Country: United States of America
- Branch: United States Air Force (18 September 1947–present); United States Army ( Army Air Forces, 20 August 1941 – 18 September 1947)
- Type: Numbered Air Force
- Role: Air component to U.S. Southern Command
- Part of: Air Combat Command; U.S. Southern Command
- Headquarters: Davis–Monthan Air Force Base, Arizona, U.S.
- Patron: Our Lady of Guadalupe, Empress of the Americas
- Engagements: See list: World War II – European-African-Middle Eastern Theater; Air Combat; Algeria-French Morocco with Arrowhead; Tunisia; Sicily; Naples-Foggia; Anzio; Rome-Arno; Southern France; North Apennines; Po Valley Grenada Panama

- Decorations: Meritorious Unit Commendation Air Force Outstanding Unit Award

Commanders
- Current commander: Maj Gen David A. Mineau
- Notable commanders: James Doolittle; John K. Cannon; Tony McPeak

The Twelfth Air Force (12 AF; Air Forces Southern, (AFSOUTH)) is a Numbered Air Force of the United States Air Force Air Combat Command (ACC). It is headquartered at Davis–Monthan Air Force Base, Arizona.

The command is the air component to United States Southern Command (USSOUTHCOM) conducting security cooperation and providing air, space, and cyberspace capabilities throughout Latin America and the Caribbean.

Established on 20 August 1942 at Bolling Field, District of Columbia, 12th Air Force was a United States Army Air Forces combat air force deployed to the Mediterranean Theater of World War II. It engaged in operations in North Africa, the Mediterranean, and Western Europe. During the Cold War, 12 AF was one of the Numbered Air Forces of the United States Air Forces in Europe (USAFE) and later Tactical Air Command (TAC), Its units engaged in combat operations during the Vietnam War, as well as Operation Desert Storm. As a result of the war on terror, most Twelfth Air Force units have operated in the United States Central Command AOR.

Since 1987 Twelfth Air Force (Air Forces Southern) trains, equips, and prepares assigned units from Air Combat Command and also serves as the air and space component to United States Southern Command.

== Mission ==
The Twelfth Air Force (Air Forces Southern) headquarters is located at Davis–Monthan Air Force Base in Arizona. It reports to Air Combat Command, a major command of the US Air Force.

As the air and space component to US Southern Command (USSOUTHCOM), Air Forces Southern conducts security cooperation and provides air, space, and cyberspace capabilities throughout its area of responsibility, covering Latin America and the Caribbean.

To fulfil these responsibilities it employs a range of Intelligence, Surveillance and Reconnaissance (ISR), intra-theatre airlift and information assets. In addition the 612th Air Operations Center (612th AOC) is responsible for developing strategy and plans to execute air operations in support of US Southern Command objectives. The 612th AOC also provides command and control of all Air Forces Southern assets in its area of responsibility.

Air Forces Southern does not have its own assets, but draws on forces provided to it by US Southern Command. Currently, AFSOUTH manages four rotational Air Force Reserve Command and Air National Guard C-130s based out of Muñiz Air National Guard Base, Puerto Rico.

== Component units ==
The following units are subordinate to the Twelfth Air Force.

=== Direct reporting units ===
- 612th Air Communications Squadron (Davis-Monthan AFB, Arizona)
- 612th Air Operations Center (Davis-Monthan AFB, Arizona)
- 612th Theater Operations Group (Davis-Monthan AFB, Arizona)

=== Organizations ===
- System of Cooperation Among the American Air Forces (El Sistema de Cooperación entre las Fuerzas Aéreas Americanas) (Davis-Monthan AFB, Arizona)
- Inter-American Air Forces Academy (Joint Base San Antonio-Lackland, Texas)

== History ==
Established in the United States during World War II to be the Army Air Forces air component of Operation Torch in 1942, Twelfth Air Force initially moved to England for training, then participated in the invasion of North Africa. It engaged in tactical operations for the remainder of the war in the Mediterranean.

Since World War II, Twelfth Air Force has subsequently served both in Europe and later the United States. The Twelfth Air Force serves as the Air Force component to the United States Southern Command.

=== Lineage ===
- Established as Twelfth Air Force, and activated, on 20 August 1942

Inactivated on 31 August 1945

- Activated on 17 May 1946

Discontinued on 1 July 1950

- Organized and activated on 21 January 1951

Redesignated as Twelfth Air Force (Air Forces Southern) on 29 February 2008

=== Assignments ===
- Army Air Forces, 20 August 1942 – 31 August 1945
- Tactical Air Command, 17 May 1946 – 1 December 1948
- Continental Air Command, 1 December 1948 – 1 July 1950
- United States Air Forces in Europe, 21 January 1951 – 1 January 1958
- Tactical Air Command, 1 January 1958 – 1 June 1992
- Air Combat Command, 1 June 1992 – present

=== Major components ===
==== USAF Air Divisions ====
- 42d Air Division, 1–8 January 1958
- 44th Air Division, 12 January – 27 June 1949
- 307th Air Division, 12 January – 27 June 1949
- 309th Air Division, 12 January – 27 June 1949
- 310th Air Division, 12 January – 27 June 1949
- USAF Southern Air Division, 1 January 1976 – 1 January 1989

Redesignated: 830th Air Division, 1 January 1989 – 15 February 1991
Redesignated: Air Forces Panama, 15 February 1991 – 11 February 1992

- 831st Air Division, 1 January 1958 – 20 April 1971; 1 December 1980 – 31 March 1991
- 832d Air Division, 1 January 1958 – 20 April 1971; 1 December 1980 – 31 March 1991
- 833d Air Division, 1 December 1980 – 15 November 1991
- 834th Air Division, 1 January 1958 – 1 April 1959; 31 January 1972 – 1 December 1974
- 835th Air Division, 23 July 1964 – 30 June 1971
- 836th Air Division, 1 January 1981 – 1 May 1992
- 838th Air Division, 1 July 1963 – 24 December 1969
- 839th Air Division, 1 July 1963 – 9 November 1964

=== Stations ===
- Bolling Field, Washington, D.C., 20–28 August 1942
- England, 12 September – 22 October 1942
- Algeria, 9 November 1942
- Tunisia, 10 August 1943
- Italy, 5 December 1943 – 31 August 1945
- March Field, California, 17 May 1946
- Brooks AFB, San Antonio, Texas, 1 January 1949 – 1 July 1950
- Wiesbaden AB, West Germany, 21 January 1951
- Ramstein AB, West Germany, 27 April 1953
- Connally AFB, Waco, Texas, 1 January 1958
- Bergstrom AFB, Austin, Texas August 1968
- Davis-Monthan AFB, Tucson, Arizona, 1 October 1992–present

=== World War II ===
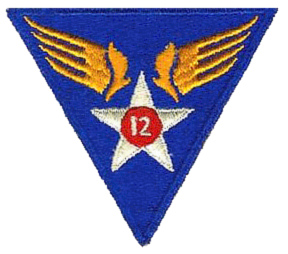
Twelfth Air Force Shoulder sleeve insignia during the 1940s.

The origins of Twelfth Air Force are traced back to a series of mid-1942 Allied planners' meetings to develop a strategy for the invasion of French North Africa (Operation Torch). Because this extensive operation required a new organization to provide enough manpower and equipment, activation plans were prepared simultaneously with the invasion strategy.

On 20 August 1942, Twelfth Air Force was activated at Bolling AAF, Maryland. On 23 September 1942, Brigadier General Jimmy Doolittle formally assumed command with Colonel Hoyt Vandenberg as chief of staff. Barely four months after it was conceived, 12th AF made its first contributions to World War II. When D-Day for the invasion of North Africa (Operation Torch) arrived on 8 November 1942, 12th AF was organized

XII Bomber Command	XII Air Support Command	XII Fighter Command	51st Troop Carrier Wing	Photographic Reconnaissance Wing
97th BG (Boeing B-17 Flying Fortress heavy bombers) (Note: From 8th Air Force)	47th Bombardment Group (Douglas A-20 light bombers)	1st Fighter Group (Lockheed P-38 Lightning)	60th TCG (Douglas C-47)	3rd Photo Group (B-17, F-4)
301st BG (B-17)	310th BG (North American B-25 Mitchell medium bomber)	14th FG (P-38)	62nd TCG (C-47)	68th Observation Group (A-20)
+17th Bombardment Group (Martin B-26 Marauder medium bombers)	33rd FG (P-40)	31st Fighter Group (Supermarine Spitfire)	64th TCG (C-47)	
+319th BG (B-26)	81st FG (P-39)	52nd Fighter Group (Spitfires)		
+320th BG (B-26)	350th FG (P-39)			
+321st BG (B-25)	82nd FG (P-38)			
15th BS (Bostons)				(+Groups training in U.S.)

Initially, 12th AF was a composite organization containing both strategic heavy bombardment groups; and tactical light and medium bombardment, fighter-bomber, and fighter groups. Based in French Morocco and Algeria after Operation Torch, it became very important for 12th AF to coordinate and cooperate with the Royal Air Force which had been fighting in North Africa for two years. Such Allied cooperation was a major concern of American President Franklin D. Roosevelt, British Prime Minister Winston Churchill, and their staffs at the Casablanca Conference in January 1943 where they created the Mediterranean Air Command (MAC) with Air Chief Marshal Sir Arthur Tedder as Air Commander-in-Chief. For planning of the Tunisian campaign, Tedder's MAC headquarters were adjacent to those of his immediate superior, the Supreme Allied Commander, General Dwight D. Eisenhower at Algiers, Algeria soon after the new Allied air force reorganization took effect on 18 February 1943.

The Northwest African Air Forces (NAAF) under Lieutenant General Carl Spaatz was the largest component of MAC and its organization was based on the 'tri-force' model (No. 205 Group 'strategic', No. 201 Group 'coastal', and Air Headquarters Western Desert 'tactical') indicated above. Thus the three major combat commands of NAAF were:

- Northwest African Strategic Air Force (NASAF) under Major General James Doolittle
- Northwest African Coastal Air Force (NACAF) under Air Vice-Marshal Hugh Lloyd
- Northwest African Tactical Air Force (NATAF) under Arthur Coningham.

In keeping with the MAC priority of encouraging USAAF-RAF cooperation, Air Vice-Marshal James Robb was named Spaatz's deputy commander of NAAF and he handled operations.

Additionally, the following new units were assigned to NAAF:

- Northwest African Air Service Command (NAASC) under Major General Delmar H. Dunton
- Northwest African Training Command (NATC) under Brigadier General John K. Cannon
- Northwest African Photographic Reconnaissance Wing (NAPRW) under the president's son, Colonel Elliott Roosevelt
- Northwest African Troop Carrier Command (NATCC) initially under Colonel Ray Dunn and later under Brigadier General Paul Williams.

Lieutenant General Lewis Brereton's 9th Air Force was assigned to RAF Middle East although its 12th Bombardment (B-25Cs) and 57th Fighter (P-40Fs) Groups formed a Desert Air Task Force detached to NATAF's Western Desert Air Force under Air Vice-Marshal Harry Broadhurst who replaced Coningham when he was promoted to NATAF commander.

The 12th AF, the largest air force ever assembled soon after its inception several months earlier, ceased to exist in the new MAC organizational structure. As an operational organization, the 12th AF simply disappeared when its groups were distributed among the various new NAAF commands. The only remaining reference to the 12th AF among these commands was Major General Edwin House's XII Air Support Command which along with Broadhurst's Western Desert Air Force, Air Vice-Marshal Sir Laurence Sinclair's Tactical Bomber Force, and Air Vice-Marshal Sir Kenneth Cross' No. 242 Group, became part of Coningham's NATAF. Later, XII Air Support Command became even less obvious when it was detached to No. 242 Group. The curious status of the 12th AF in February 1943 is illustrated by the quotation below taken from the official history

"One of the admittedly minor problems of the reorganization concerned the status of the Twelfth Air Force. Its units, personnel, and equipment having been transferred entirely to NAAF on February 18, both on paper and in actuality the Twelfth seemed to have vanished. At his last staff meeting, on February 22, Doolittle expressed the opinion that once such matters as courts-martial had been wound up, the "skeleton" of the Twelfth--"the name only"--would have either to be returned to the States for a reincarnation or be decently interred by War Department order. Spaatz put the question to Eisenhower and, receiving answer that Headquarters, Twelfth Air Force, would be continued as the administrative headquarters for the U.S. Army elements of NAAF, he took command of the Twelfth on March 1. As commander, however, he had no staff as such, it being assumed that AAF officers named to the NAAF staff had been automatically placed in equivalent positions in the Twelfth. Actually, all administrative functions were carried on by NAAF and the half-existence of the Twelfth served mainly to mystify all but a few headquarters experts."

Although the 12th AF was essentially unrecognized in the official Allied air force organization (MAC), it was of course, still a major entity in the USAAF. But even the U.S. Army Air Forces World War II Combat Chronology 1941–1945, recorded its daily chronology entries under "NAAF" rather than "12th AF" between 1 March and 1 September 1943. The U.S. Ninth Air Force retained its identity in MAC (and in the USAAF Combat Chronology) even though it was officially a sub-command of RAF Middle East Command and most of its groups were assigned to other operational commands such as NATAF after the February reorganization of the Allied air forces.

On 22 August 1943, the Ninth Air Force's 12th and 340th Bombardment Groups, and its 57th, 79th, and 324th Fighter Groups were transferred to the 12th AF. This change coincided with the transfer of the 9th AF from the MTO to the European Theater of Operations (ETO).

On 1 September 1943 all administrative functions of USAAF elements of NAAF were transferred to the appropriate Twelfth AF organizations: HQ NAAF to HQ Twelfth AF, NASAF to XII Bomber Command, NATAF to XII Air Support Command, NACAF to XII Fighter Command, NAASC to XII AFSC, NAAF TCC to XII Troop Carrier Command (Provisional), NWPRW to Photographic Reconnaissance Wing (Provisional), and NATC to XII Training Command (Provisional) but operational control remained with NAAF.

On 10 December 1943 MAC was disbanded and reorganized as the Mediterranean Allied Air Forces (MAAF) with Air Chief Marshal Sir Arthur Tedder as Air Commander-in-Chief. In mid-January 1944, Lieutenant General Ira Eaker took over MAAF when Eisenhower chose Tedder to oversee air operations and planning for the Normandy Landings. The new MAAF organization retained the original tri-force model adopted by the Casablanca Conference in creating MAC nearly one year earlier:

- Mediterranean Allied Strategic Air Force (MASAF) under Major General Nathan Twining
- Mediterranean Allied Coastal Air Force (MACAF) under Air Vice-Marshal Hugh Lloyd
- Mediterranean Allied Tactical Air Force (MATAF) under Major General John K. Cannon.

Components of the 12th AF, also under Cannon, were assigned to his various MATAF sub-commands after the 12th's heavy bomb groups (and three B-26 medium bomb groups that were eventually returned to the 12th) were transferred to the newly created Fifteenth Air Force (1 November 1943; briefly under Doolittle and then Twining) as part of MASAF. In January 1944, Doolittle took over the 8th AF in England which along with the 15th AF in Italy, formed the United States Strategic Air Forces (USSTAF) under Spaatz.

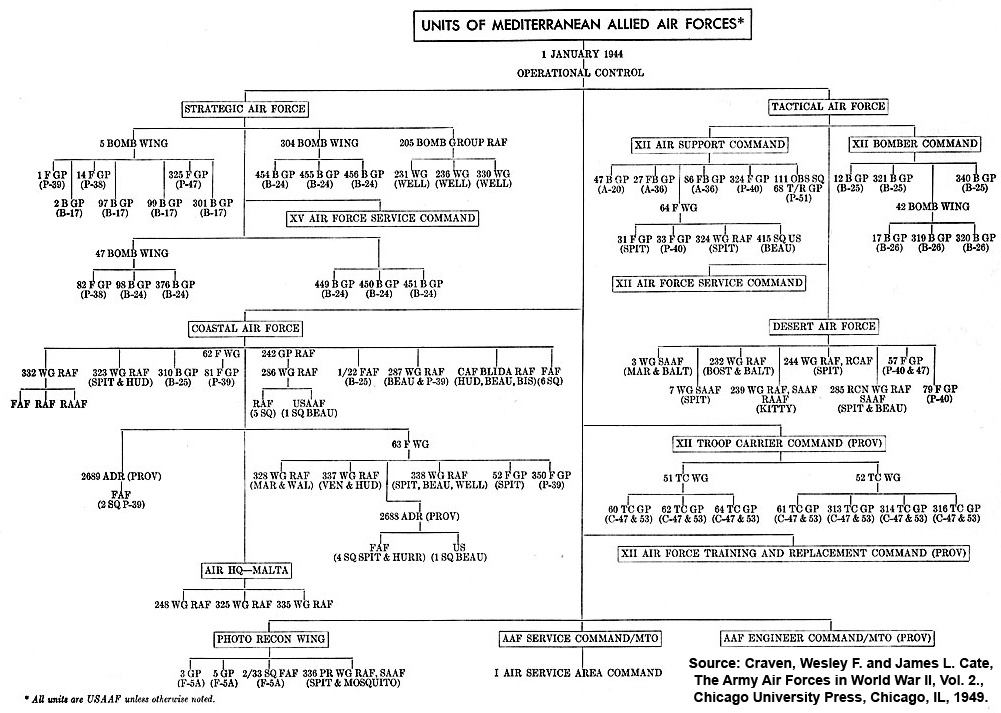
Units and Organization of the Mediterranean Allied Air Forces in January 1944.

As the U.S. tactical air force in the Mediterranean, the 12th AF primarily provided close tactical support to U.S. ground forces in Italy and Southern France and targeted lines of transportation and communication, particularly roads, railroads, and bridges until the end of the war.

12th AF operated in the Mediterranean, French Morocco, Algeria, Tunisia, Greece, Italy, Southern France, Yugoslavia, Albania, Romania, and Austria. By V-E Day, 12th AF had flown 430,681 sorties, dropped 217,156 tons of bombs, claimed destruction of 2,857 enemy aircraft, and lost 2,667 of its own aircraft.

When hostilities ended, Twelfth Air Force was inactivated at Florence, Italy, on 31 August 1945.

12th Air Force Stations:

- Bolling Field, D.C., 20 to 28 August 1942
- England, 12 September to 22 October 1942
- Algeria, 9 November 1942
- Tunisia, 10 August 1943
- Italy, 5 December 1943 to 31 August 1945.

12th Air Force Commanders:

- Lt. Col. Roger J. Browne, 26 August 1942
- Lt. Col. Harold L. Neely, 28 August 1942
- Maj. Gen. James H. Doolittle, 23 September 1942
- Lt. Gen. Carl Spaatz, 1 March 1943
- Lt. Gen. John K. Cannon, 21 December 1943
- Maj. Gen. Benjamin W. Chidlaw, 2 April 1945
- Brig. Gen. Charles T. Myers, 26 May to 31 August 1945.

12th Air Force Campaigns: Air Combat, EAME Theater; Algeria-French Morocco; Tunisia; Sicily; Naples-Foggia; Anzio; Rome-Arno; southern France; North Apennines; Po Valley.

==== Commands ====
===== XII Tactical Air Command =====
XII Tactical Air Command was constituted as XII Ground Air Support Command on 10 September 1942 and activated on 17 September. It was assigned to Twelfth Air Force and redesignated as XII Air Support Command, and later redesignated as XII Tactical Air Command in April 1944. The command was moved to French Morocco on 9 November 1942 as part of the Operation Torch landings in North Africa.

XII Tactical Air Command served in combat in the Mediterranean and European theaters until May 1945. Known units were:

- 5th Bombardment Wing (1942)

(Groups transferred to XII Bomber Command)

- 64th Fighter Wing (1943–1945)
  Algeria, Tunisia, Sicily, Italy

27th Fighter Group (June 1943 – May 1945) (A-36)
31st Fighter Group (November 1942 – April 1944) (Spitfire)
33d Fighter Group (November 1942 – February 1944) (P-39)
86th Fighter Group (July 1943 – April 1945) (A-36, P-40, P-47)
324th Fighter Group (October 1943 – May 1945) (P-47)

- 57th Bombardment Wing (1943)

Transferred from 9th Air Force

(Groups transferred to XII Bomber Command)

- 87th Fighter Wing (April–September 1944)
  Algeria, Italy, Corsica

57th Fighter Group (1944) (P-47)
86th Fighter Group (1944) (P-47)

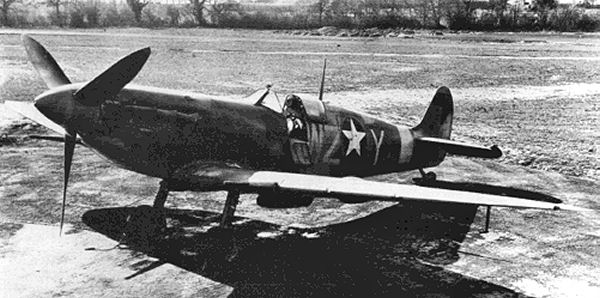
Spitfire V of the 309th Fighter Squadron 31st Fighter Group

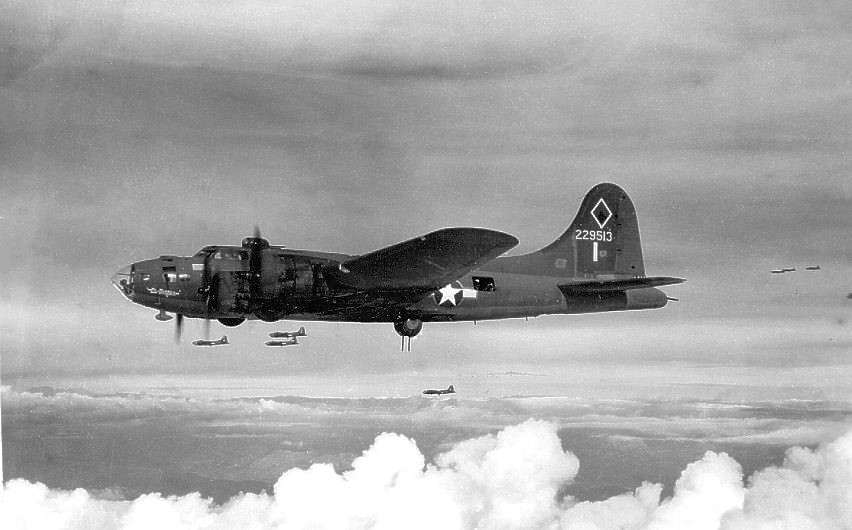
Boeing B-17F of 346th Bombardment Squadron, 99th Bombardment Group

Colonel Demas T. Craw and Major Pierpont M. Hamilton were awarded the Medal of Honor for heroism during the invasion of Algeria-French Morocco (Operation Torch). When the Allies landed at Mehdia, French Morocco on 8 November 1942, both men volunteered to go behind enemy lines and meet with the French commander near Port Lyautey, French Morocco, to broker a cease fire.

After landing on the beach under hostile fire, Craw, his interpreter Major Pierpont M. Hamilton, and their driver Private Orris Correy approached the French headquarters in a light truck. They came under machine gun fire, leaving Craw dead. Hamilton and Correy were captured. Although imprisoned, Major Hamilton succeeded in persuading the French to surrender and was awarded the Medal of Honor on 19 February 1943. Private Correy was promoted to Sergeant and Pierpont Hamilton, a descendant of Alexander Hamilton, became an intelligence officer in the Northwest African Tactical Air Force a subordinate command of the newly created Northwest African Air Forces under Lieutenant General Carl Spaatz who also assumed administrative command of the Twelfth Air Force on 1 March 1943.

Colonel Demas Craw was awarded his Medal of Honor posthumously on 4 March 1943 and the United States Navy named their air base at Port Lyautey, French Morocco Craw Field in his honor on 12 January 1944. The only member of the Twelfth Air Force to be awarded the Medal of Honor for heroism in the air was Lt. Raymond L. Knight of the 350th Fighter Group.

===== XII Bomber Command =====
XII Bomber Command was constituted on 26 February 1942 and activated on 13 March at MacDill AAF Florida. It was assigned to Twelfth Air Force in August and transferred, without personnel and equipment, to High Wycombe England where the command was re-formed. XII Bomber Command was moved to Tafaraoui, Algeria on 22 November 1942 as part of the Operation Torch landings in North Africa.

XII Bomber Command served in combat in the Mediterranean theater until 1 November 1943 when most of the personnel were withdrawn. The command was restaffed in January 1944 and served in combat until 1 March. It was disbanded in Corsica on 10 June 1944.

Known XII Bomber Command units were:

- 5th Bombardment Wing (November 1942 – November 1943)

Units transferred from XII Tactical Air Command
Reassigned to Fifteenth Air Force, November 1943
Located in: French Morocco, Algeria, Tunisia, Italy

2d Bombardment Group (March–November 1943) (B-17)
47th Bombardment Group (November 1942 – November 1943) (A-20, A-26)

15th Bombardment Squadron (Light) (November 1942) (RAF Douglas A-20C Havoc Boston III)**

97th Bombardment Group (November 1942 – November 1943) (B-17)

Transferred from Eighth Air Force

98th Bombardment Group (September–November 1943) (B-24)

Transferred from Ninth Air Force

99th Bombardment Group (February–November 1943) (B-17)
301st Bombardment Group (December 1942 – November 1943) (B-17)

Transferred from Eighth Air Force

376th Bombardment Group (September–November 1943) (B-24)

Transferred from Ninth Air Force

1st Fighter Group (November 1942 – November 1943) (P-38)
14th Fighter Group (November 1942 – November 1943) (P-38)

Transferred from Eighth Air Force

325th Fighter Group (February–November 1943) (P-40)
68th Reconnaissance Group (November 1942 – November 1943)

(P-38, P-39, P-40, P-51, A-20, A-36, B-17, B-24)

.** Survivors of Australian-based 27th Bomb Group transferred to 12th AF.
Absorbed into 47th BG

- 42d Bombardment Wing (July 1943 – October 1945)

Reassigned to XII Tactical Air Command May 1945
Located in: Tunisia, Sardinia, Corsica, France

17th Bombardment Group (January 1944 – October 1945) (B-26)
319th Bombardment Group (July 1943 – January 1945) (B-25, B-26)
320th Bombardment Group (July 1943 – July 1945) (B-26)
1st Fighter Group (July–November 1943) (P-38)
325th Fighter Group (July–December 1943) (P-40)

- 47th Bombardment Wing (November 1942 – November 1943)

Reassigned to 15th Air Force November 1943
Located in: French Morocco, Algeria, Tunisia

17th Bombardment Group (December 1942 – November 1943) (B-26)
98th Bombardment Group (September–November 1943) (B-24)

Transferred from Ninth Air Force

310th Bombardment Group (December 1942 – November 1943) (B-25)
319th Bombardment Group (December 1942 – November 1943) (B-26)
320th Bombardment Group (December 1942 – November 1943) (B-26)
321st Bombardment Group (December 1942 – November 1943) (B-25)
376th Bombardment Group (September–November 1943) (B-24)

Transferred from Ninth Air Force

33d Fighter Group (November 1942 – November 1943) (P-40)
81st Fighter Group (January–November 1943) (P-40)
82d Fighter Group (November 1942 – November 1943) (P-38)
325th Fighter Group (January–November 1943) (P-40)

- 57th Bombardment Wing (August 1943 – September 1945)

Units transferred from XII Tactical Air Command
Inactivated in Italy September 1945
Located in: Tunisia, Sicily, Italy, Corsica

12th Bombardment Group (August 1943 – February 1944) (B-25)

Transferred to Tenth Air Force

47th Bombardment Group (1943–1944) (A-20, A-26)
310th Bombardment Group (1944) (B-25)
319th Bombardment Group (1944) (B-25)
321st Bombardment Group (1943–1944) (B-25)
340th Bombardment Group (1943–1944) (B-25)
57th Fighter Group (August 1943 – September 1945) (P-40, P-47)
79th Fighter Group (August 1943 – September 1945) (P-40, P-47)

===== XXII Tactical Air Command =====
XXII Tactical Air Command was constituted on 26 February 1942 and activated on 5 March. It was redesignated as XII Fighter Command in May 1942, and XXII Tactical Air Command in November 1944.

The command was assigned to Twelfth Air Force in August 1942 and was moved to RAF Wattisham England in September, then on to Tafaraoui, Algeria on 8 November 1942 as part of the Operation Torch landings in North Africa.

XXII Tactical Air Command served in combat in the Mediterranean theater until the end of the war. It was inactivated at Pomigliano Italy on 4 October 1945.

Known XXII Tactical Air Command units were:

- 63d Fighter Wing (July 1943 – November 1944)

Located in: Algeria, Corsica, Italy, France

52d Fighter Group (Spitfire) (1943–1944)
350th Fighter Group (P-38, P-39, P-47, P-400) (1943–1944)
412th Night Fighter Squadron (January 1943 – October 1945) (P-61)

- 87th Fighter Wing (April–September 1944)

Located in: Algeria, Italy, Corsica

57th Fighter Group (P-47) (1944)
79th Fighter Group (P-47) (1944)
86th Fighter Group (P-47, A-36) (1944)

- 64th Fighter Wing (July 1943 – November 1944)

Located in: Algeria, Tunisia, Sicily, Italy, France

27th Fighter Group (A-36) (1943)
31st Fighter Group (P-51, Spitfire) (1943)
33d Fighter Group (P-38) (1943)
86th Fighter Group (P-47, A-36) (1943)
324th Fighter Group (P-40) (1943)
415th Night Fighter Squadron (February 1943 – October 1945) (P-61)

===== XII Troop Carrier Command (Provisional) =====
- 51st Troop Carrier Wing (C-47) (November 1942 – May 1945)
  Algeria, Tunisia, Sicily, Italy
  - 60th Troop Carrier Group
  - 62d Troop Carrier Group
  - 64th Troop Carrier Group
- 52d Troop Carrier Wing (C-47) (April 1943 – February 1944)
  French Morocco, Tunisia, Sicily
  - 313th Troop Carrier Group
  - 314th Troop Carrier Group
  - 316th Troop Carrier Group

=== Postwar era ===
With the end of combat in the Mediterranean and European theaters in 1945, Twelfth Air Force was inactivated. However XII Tactical Air Command was reassigned as part of the occupation force in Germany of the United States Air Forces in Europe. The groups operated P-47 or P-51 aircraft. Units assigned for occupation duty were:

- 27th Fighter Group (1945)
  Inactivated on 7 November 1945.
- 36th Fighter Group (1945–1946)
  Transferred to the United States in February 1946.
- 86th Fighter Group (1945–1946)
  Transferred to the United States in February 1946.
- 324th Fighter Group (1945)
  Inactivated October 1945.
- 406th Fighter-Bomber Group (1945–1946)
  Inactivated 20 August 1946.
- 52d Fighter Group (1945)
  Inactivated 7 November 1945.
- 354th Fighter Group (1945–1946)
  Inactivated 31 March 1946.
- 355th Fighter Group (1945–1946)
  Transferred to the United States on 1 August 1946.

XII Tactical Air Command was inactivated at Bad Kissingen, Germany, on 10 November 1947.

=== Cold War ===
Twelfth Air Force was reactivated at March Field, California, on 17 May 1946, and assigned to Tactical Air Command with training responsibilities.

In the late 1940s, following several assignments and inactivations, 12 AF reactivated on 21 January 1951 at Wiesbaden AB, West Germany, assigned to United States Air Forces in Europe. Twelfth Air Force became the first USAFE formation to be declared available to NATO. Along with French and Canadian air units, 12 AF was part of the Fourth Allied Tactical Air Force, itself part of NATO's Allied Air Forces Central Europe. It included the 21st Fighter-Bomber Wing, located in France, and the 85th Air Depot Wing at Erding in Germany.

On 1 January 1958, Twelfth Air Force relocated to Waco, Texas adjacent to James Connally Air Force Base, Texas, and assigned to Tactical Air Command. During its 10 years at Connally AFB its mission began to focus on training tactical air crews to a state of combat readiness capable of conducting joint air operations.

In September 1968, Twelfth Air Force moved to Bergstrom AFB, Texas. During the Vietnam War, the Twelfth was a primary source for tactical fighter, reconnaissance, and airlift forces deployed to the war zone in Southeast Asia.

In 1987, the Twelfth Air Force commander took on the United States Air Force Southern Command responsibility. As such, 12 AF manages all Air Force personnel and assets in the United States Southern Command area of responsibility--Central and South America. During the United States invasion of Panama in 1989, for example, 12 AF and other Air Force units deployed in support of U.S. forces, returning democracy to Panama. In 1994, 12 AF managed and orchestrated Operation Uphold Democracy's air operations, the mission to restore Haitian democracy while at the same time supporting U.S. Southern Command's Operation Safe Haven for Cuban refugees.

=== Post Cold War ===
On 13 July 1993, Headquarters Twelfth Air Force officially moved from Bergstrom AFB to Davis-Monthan AFB, Arizona. Since then, 12 AF personnel and units have participated in operations in many other parts of the world: Southern Watch, Operation Provide Comfort, Operation Deny Flight, Provide Promise, peacekeeping in Somalia (Restore Hope), and JOINT ENDEAVOR. During the Gulf War (Operations Desert Shield and Desert Storm) 12 AF provided fighter and reconnaissance aircraft to support U.S. Central Command Air Forces.

Since the 11 September 2001 terrorist attacks, Twelfth Air Force (Air Forces Southern) has worked closely with Caribbean, Central, and South American countries in the global war on terrorism. The command has supported efforts to stem the flow of illegal drugs into the U.S. and neighboring countries. 12 AF has also provided forces to Operations Enduring Freedom Afghanistan, IRAQI FREEDOM, and NOBLE GUARDIAN in the U.S. Today 12 AF directs six combat wings, five Direct Reporting Units, as well as 12 AF gained Air Force Reserve and Air National Guard units.

The Twelfth Air Force served as a USAF headquarters responsible for the combat readiness of six active-duty wings and one direct reporting unit for contingency operations, and oversaw 21 gained units from Air Force Reserve Command and the Air National Guard, totalling more than 630 aircraft with more than 42,000 personnel.

On 20 August 2020, Twelfth Air Force's fighter jets, battle management aircraft, strike drones, and combat search-and-rescue forces were transferred to the newly reformed Fifteenth Air Force. The change is expected to allow Twelfth Air Force to better focus on its mission as air component to US Southern Command. The following units were subordinate to the Twelfth Air Force prior to their transfer to the Fifteenth Air Force.

Active Duty

- 355th Wing (Davis-Monthan AFB, Arizona) – A-10C Thunderbolt II, HC-130J Combat King II, HH-60G Pave Hawk
- 366th Fighter Wing (Mountain Home AFB, Idaho) – F-15E Strike Eagle
- 388th Fighter Wing (Hill AFB, Utah) – F-35A Lightning II
- 432nd Air Expeditionary Wing (Creech AFB, Nevada) – MQ-9A Reaper, RQ-170A Sentinel
- 474th Air Expeditionary Group (Davis-Monthan AFB, Arizona)
- 552nd Air Control Wing (Tinker AFB, Oklahoma) – E-3B/C/G Sentry

Air Force Reserve

- 301st Fighter Wing (NAS Joint Reserve Base Fort Worth, Texas) – F-16C/D Fighting Falcon
- 419th Fighter Wing (Hill AFB, Utah) – F-16C/D Fighting Falcon

Air National Guard

- 114th Fighter Wing (Joe Foss Field ANGS, South Dakota) – F-16C/D Fighting Falcon
- 115th Fighter Wing (Truax Field ANGB, Wisconsin) – F-16C Fighting Falcon and RC-26B Condor
- 124th Fighter Wing (Gowen Field ANGB, Idaho) – A-10C Thunderbolt II
- 129th Rescue Wing (Moffett Federal Airfield, California) – HC-130J Combat King II and HH-60G Pave Hawk
- 132nd Wing (Des Moines ANGB, Iowa) – MQ-9A Reaper
- 138th Fighter Wing (Tulsa ANGB, Oklahoma) – F-16C/D Fighting Falcon
- 140th Wing (Buckley Space Force Base, Colorado) – F-16C Fighting Falcon
- 142nd Fighter Wing (Portland ANGB, Oregon) – F-15C/D Eagle
- 144th Fighter Wing (Fresno ANGB, California) – F-15C/D Eagle
- 148th Fighter Wing (Duluth ANGB, Minnesota) – F-16C Fighting Falcon
- 163rd Attack Wing (March ARB, California) – MQ-9A Reaper
- 183rd Fighter Wing (Capital Airport ANGS), Illinois)

Direct Reporting Units

- 820th Rapid Engineer Deployable Heavy Operational Repair Squadron Engineers (RED HORSE) Squadron (Nellis AFB, Nevada)

== List of commanders ==
No.	Commander		Term		
No.	Portrait	Name	Took office	Left office	Term length
1	Norman Seip	Lieutenant General; Norman Seip	July 2006	August 2009	~3 years, 31 days
2	Glenn Spears	Lieutenant General; Glenn Spears	August 2009	1 December 2011	~2 years, 122 days
3	Robin Rand	Lieutenant General; Robin Rand	1 December 2011	24 September 2013	1 year, 297 days
4	Tod D. Wolters	Lieutenant General; Tod D. Wolters	24 September 2013	19 December 2014	1 year, 86 days
5	Mark Nowland	Lieutenant General; Mark Nowland	19 December 2014	3 October 2016	1 year, 289 days
6	Mark D. Kelly	Lieutenant General; Mark D. Kelly	3 October 2016	3 August 2018	1 year, 304 days
6	Andrew A. Croft	Major General; Andrew A. Croft	3 August 2018	21 August 2020	2 years, 18 days
7	Barry Cornish	Major General; Barry Cornish	21 August 2020	22 July 2022	1 year, 335 days
8	Evan L. Pettus	Major General; Evan L. Pettus	22 July 2022	11 September 2024	2 years, 51 days
9	David A. Mineau	Major General; David A. Mineau	11 September 2024	Incumbent	1 year, 336 days
