= Henry Barton (disambiguation) =

Henry Barton (died 1435) was an English public official, MP for London and Lord Mayor of London.

Henry Barton may also refer to:

- Henry Barton (academic) (died 1790), British clergyman and academic, Warden of Merton College, Oxford
- Henry Baldwin Barton (1869–1952), British army officer, Mayor of the Metropolitan Borough of Finsbury
- Henry Barton (racing driver) (born 2006), American stock car racing driver

== See also ==
- Harry Barton (disambiguation)
