= Northwest African Air Forces =

Northwest African Air Forces (NWAAF, NAAF)
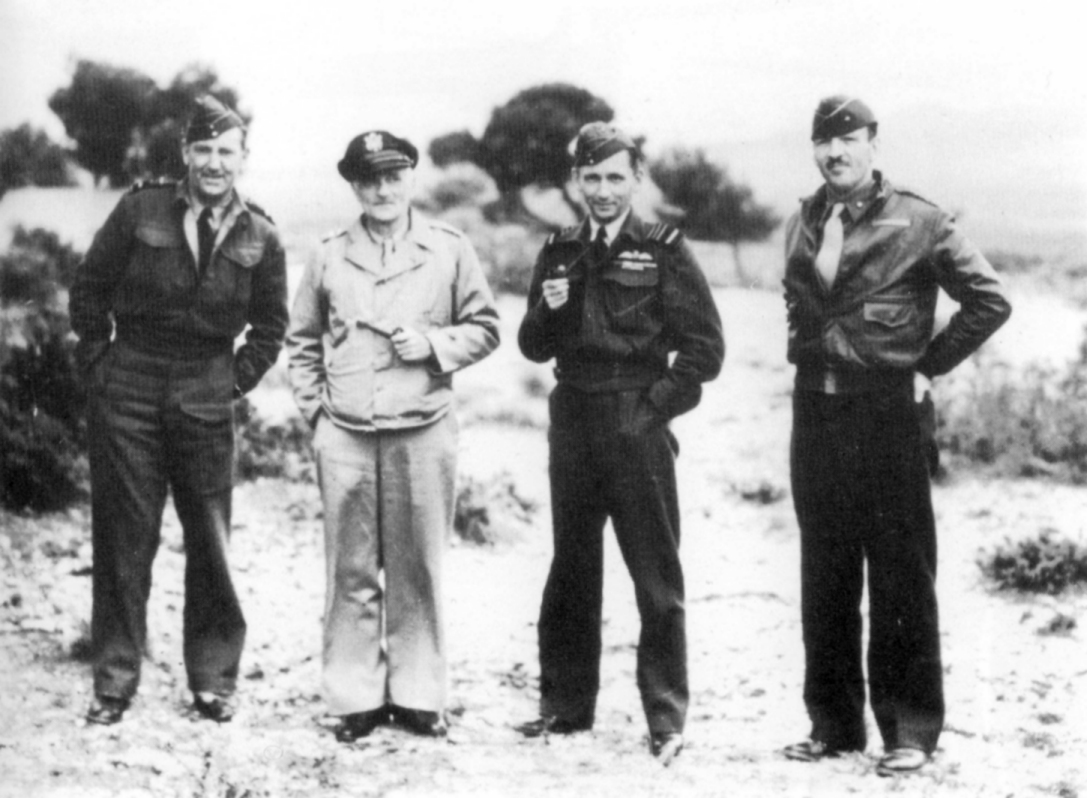
- April 1943. NATAF commander Air Vice Marshal Arthur Coningham (left); Northwest African Air Forces (NAAF) commander Lieutenant General Carl Spaatz (second left), Mediterranean Air Command (MAC) commander Air Marshal Arthur Tedder (second right) and staff officer Brigadier General Laurence S. Kuter (right).
- Active: Formed February 18, 1943.
- Allegiance: Allies of World War II
- Branch: United States Army Air Forces/Royal Air Force/South African Air Force/Royal Australian Air Force
- Type: Major Command
- Role: "Open the Mediterranean sea lanes and help drive the Axis from Tunisia and Africa" (David R. Mets)
- Engagements: 1943-02-18 North African campaign 1943-02-18 Tunisia Campaign 1943-06-25/26 Oil campaign of World War II (Bari, Italy)

Northwest African Air Forces (NAAF) was a component of the Allied Mediterranean Air Command (MAC) during February–December 1943. It was responsible primarily for air operations during the Tunisian Campaign and bombing of Italy. Its commander was Lieutenant General Carl Spaatz of the United States Army Air Force. NAAF was created following a reorganization of the command structure of Allied air forces in the Mediterranean Theatre. The other components of MAC were Middle East Command (MEC), AHQ Malta, RAF Gibraltar and 216 Group.

The first units of the United States Army Air Forces (USAAF) arrived in the Middle East in June 1942 and were organized as the Ninth Air Force. In November 1942, the U.S. Army 12th Air Force established a foothold in Algeria following Operation Torch. Cooperation between the Allied air forces was an important priority in the Mediterranean theatre and U.S. President Franklin D. Roosevelt, British Prime Minister Winston Churchill, and their staffs addressed this priority at the Casablanca Conference in January 1943 when they established a new Allied air force organization known as the Mediterranean Air Command (MAC) with Air Chief Marshal Sir Arthur Tedder as Air Commander-in-Chief.

NAAF was organized on a successful tripartite (or "tri-force") air interdiction model – consisting of specialised strategic, coastal, and tactical air forces – pioneered by Air Marshal Arthur Tedder and Air Vice Marshal Arthur Coningham of Middle East Command in Egypt and Libya during 1942. Effective coordination of air and ground forces was a key feature of the tripartite model. Consequently, the main combat commands of NAAF emulated MEC. This tripartite command structure was regarded as successful; it was therefore retained when NAAF was superseded in December 1943, by the Mediterranean Allied Air Forces (MAAF).

== Structure ==
From February 18, 1943, the Northwest African Air Forces (NAAF) under Lieutenant General Carl Spaatz became the largest and primary sub-command of MAC. The Casablanca planners modeled NAAF after the successful coordination of strategic, coastal, and tactical units of the Middle East Command under Tedder during the campaigns in Egypt and Libya in 1942. Accordingly, the Northwest African Air Forces had three major combined combat commands.

- Northwest African Strategic Air Force (NASAF) under former 12th Air Force commander Major General James H. Doolittle, included: the former XII Bomber Command of B-17 Flying Fortresses, No. 205 (Heavy Bomber) Group's bombardment force consisting of four wings (10–12 British Commonwealth bomber squadrons) and several heavy bomber elements from the USAAF Ninth Air Force;
- Northwest African Coastal Air Force (NACAF), initially under (acting commander) Group Captain G. G. Barrett and, soon afterwards, Air Vice-Marshal Hugh Lloyd: comprised No. 201 (Naval Co-operation) Group's anti-shipping coastal force (10 squadrons: Greek, Royal Australian Air Force (RAAF), South African Air Force (SAAF) and Royal Air Force (RAF); and
- Northwest African Tactical Air Force (NATAF) under Acting Air Marshal Sir Arthur Coningham, including Air Headquarters, Western Desert's tactical fighter command (including the USAAF Desert Air Task Force consisting of the United States 57th Fighter and 12th Bombardment Groups) and XII Air Support Command units.

The following support commands were also assigned to NAAF:

- Northwest African Air Service Command (NAASC) under Major General Delmar H. Dunton;
- Northwest African Training Command (NATC) under Brigadier General John K. Cannon;
- Northwest African Photographic Reconnaissance Wing (NAPRW) under Colonel Elliott Roosevelt, the US president's son; and
- Northwest African Troop Carrier Command (NATCC) initially under Colonel Ray Dunn and later under Brigadier General Paul L. Williams.

== Operations ==
To foster cooperation between the British RAF and the American USAAF in particular, the commands listed above and their various sub-commands were intended to have a commanding officer from one air force and a deputy from the other air force. In keeping with this plan, Spaatz's deputy of NAAF was Air Vice-Marshal James Robb who handled operations.

Strong consideration was also given to the concept that air, naval, and ground forces should coordinate effectively to provide optimum support of ground troops. In 1942–1943, when the role of air power was still being explored on the battlefield, classic close air support was essentially pioneered and developed by Tedder as Commander-in-Chief of Middle East Command and Coningham as Air Officer Commanding (AOC) of Air Headquarters Western Desert.

The importance of flexible coordination between air, naval, and ground forces took much time to realize let alone implement during the Desert war. Finally, it was Tedder (Churchill's second choice for Middle East Commander when Air Vice-Marshal Owen Boyd was captured) who finally realized, despite the encumbrances of the current military dogma and commander egos, that every campaign must be planned and executed as a "joint operation" by all three forces. Soon after being named Air Officer Commanding of RAF Middle East in June 1941, Tedder said: "In my opinion, sea, land and air operations in the Middle East Theater are now so closely inter-related that effective coordination will only be possible if the campaign is considered and controlled as a combined operation in the full sense of that term." In particular, the flexibility between Coningham's WDAF and the 8th Army has been contrasted with the more rigid relationship between the Luftwaffe and German ground forces.

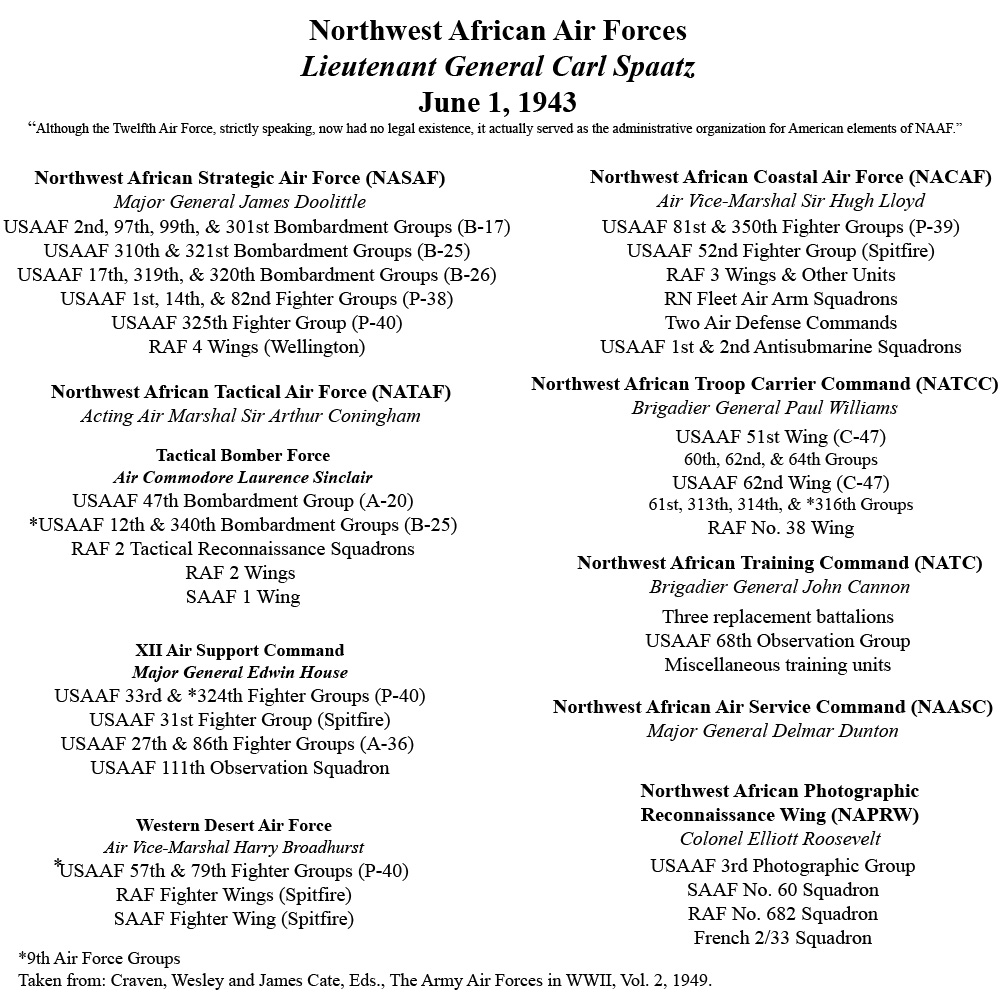
Units and Organization of the Northwest African Air Forces on June 1, 1943.

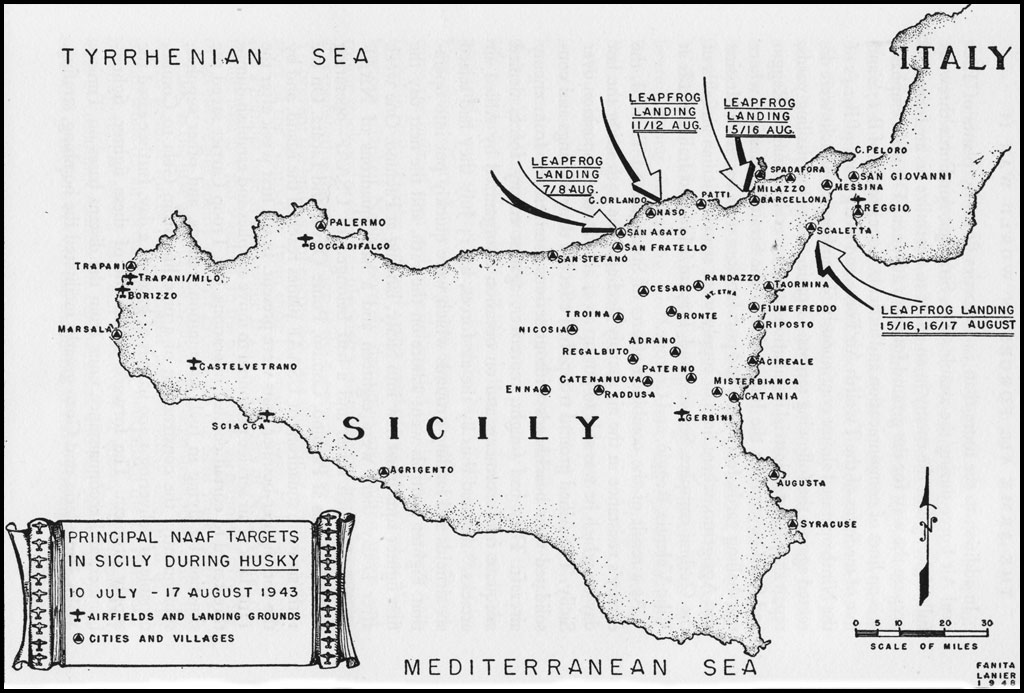
Principal Sicilian targets of the Northwest African Air Forces for Operation Husky.

The United States 12th Air Force, the largest air force ever assembled soon after its inception several months earlier, ceased to exist in the new MAC organizational structure. The 12th simply disappeared as its groups were distributed among the various new NAAF commands above. The sole reference to the 12th Air Force among the higher tier commands was Brigadier General Edwin House's XII Air Support Command which along with Air Vice Marshal Harry Broadhurst's Western Desert Air Force, Air Commodore Laurence Sinclair's Tactical Bomber Force, and Air Commodore Sir Kenneth Cross' No. 242 Group, became subordinate commands of Coningham's NATAF. Later, XII Air Support Command became even less obvious in the MAC structure when it was detached to No. 242 Group. Prior to the invasion of Sicily (Operation Husky) in July 1943, No. 242 Group was assigned to Lloyd's NACAF on Malta.

NAAF was the first official command based upon the "tri-force" model. Successfully practiced and developed during the Tunisian, Pantellerian, Sicilian, and Italian campaigns, the tripartite model was retained by subsequent Allied air forces for D-Day Normandy and D-Day Southern France. Even some of today's air forces consider the historical precedents of the "tri-force" model.

== Termination & reorganization of NAAF ==
On December 10, 1943, MAC was disbanded and the Allied air forces in the MTO were again reorganized as the Mediterranean Allied Air Forces (MAAF) with Air Chief Marshal Sir Arthur Tedder as Air Commander-in-Chief. In mid-January 1944, Lieutenant General Ira Eaker took over MAAF when Eisenhower chose Tedder to oversee air operations and planning for the Normandy Landings. The new MAAF organization contained separate strategic, coastal, and tactical air forces under a single unified structure:

- Mediterranean Allied Strategic Air Force (MASAF) under Major General Nathan Twining;
- Mediterranean Allied Coastal Air Force (MACAF) under Air Vice-Marshal Hugh Lloyd; and
- Mediterranean Allied Tactical Air Force (MATAF) under Major General John K. Cannon.
