= John K. Cannon =

United States Air Force general (1892–1955)

John Kenneth Cannon
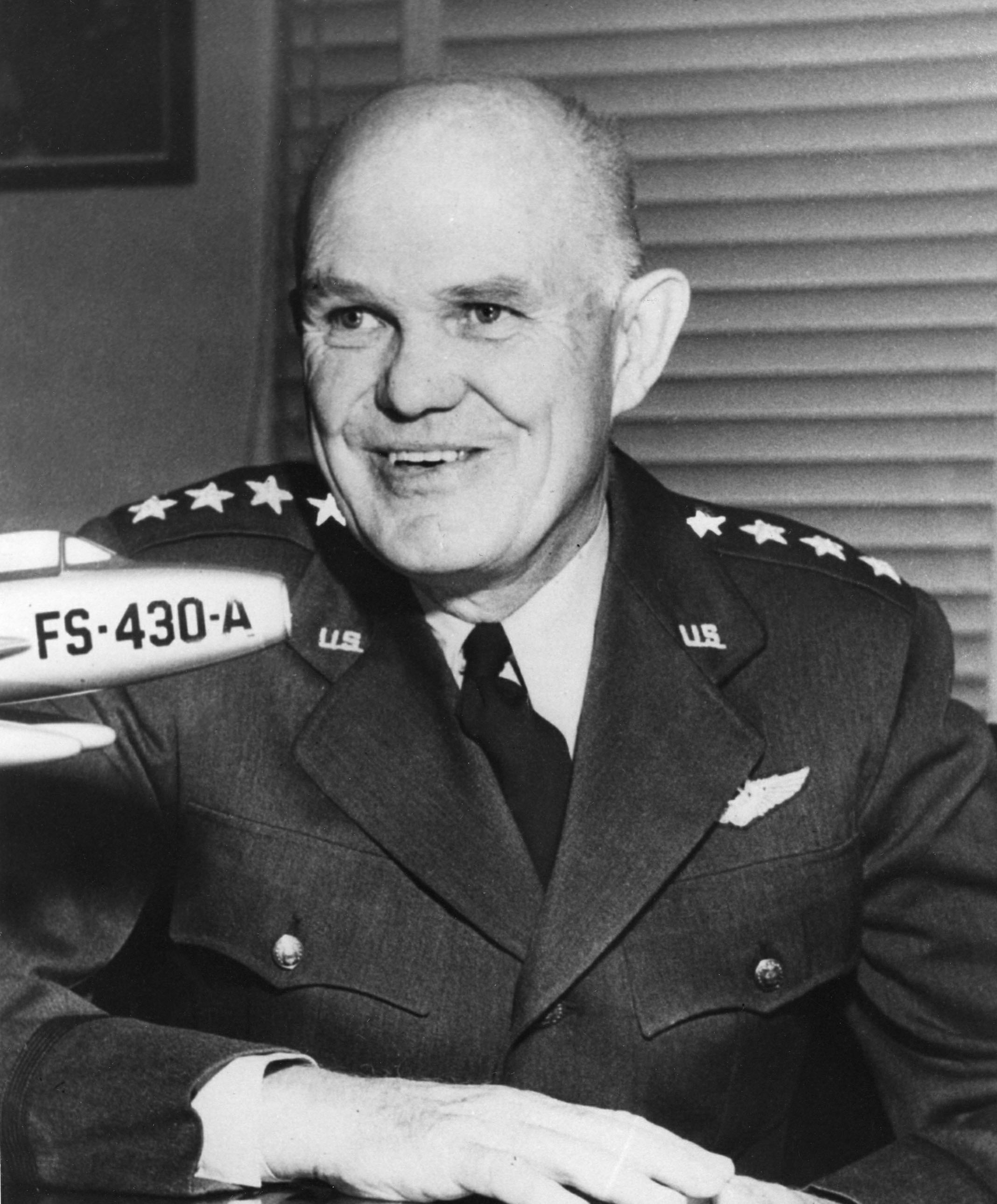
- General John Kenneth Cannon
- Born: March 9, 1892; Salt Lake City, Utah, US
- Died: January 12, 1955 (aged 62); Arcadia, California, US
- Burial place: Arlington National Cemetery
- Military career
- Allegiance: United States of America
- Branch: United States Air Force
- Service years: 1917–1954
- Rank: General
- Commands: Tactical Air Command; Air Training Command; Twelfth Air Force; Mediterranean Allied Tactical Air Force; Northwest African Training Command; 94th Pursuit Squadron
- Conflicts: World War II
- Awards: Distinguished Service Medal (4); Legion of Merit; Bronze Star; Air Medal

General John Kenneth Cannon (March 9, 1892 – January 12, 1955) was a World War II Mediterranean combat commander and former chief of United States Air Forces in Europe for whom Cannon Air Force Base, Clovis, New Mexico, is named.

== Biography ==
John Kenneth Cannon was born in Salt Lake City, Utah Territory, in 1892. He graduated from Utah Agricultural College (now Utah State University) in 1914 and was appointed a second lieutenant in the United States Army Infantry Reserve on November 27, 1917.

He served the infantry at Camp Fremont, California; Camp Mills, New York, the Presidio of San Francisco; and Camp Furlong, New Mexico, until taking pilot training at Kelly Field, Texas in 1921–22. He completed pursuit pilot training at Ellington Field, Texas, on April 23, 1922, where one of his seven classmates was Lt. Claire Lee Chennault. In the Air Service he became director of flying at Kelly in the fall of 1922.

Cannon went to Hawaii in January 1925, assigned to the 6th Pursuit Squadron at Luke Field on Ford Island, where he became operations officer of the 5th Composite Group. Two years later, he was commanding officer of the 94th Pursuit Squadron at Selfridge Field, Michigan. He returned to Kelly in 1929 as director of pursuit training, with promotion to captain, and became director of training at Randolph Field, Texas, in August 1931. He completed the courses at the Air Corps Tactical School and the Command and General Staff School, with promotion to major in March 1935 and assignment to March Field, California.

In June 1938, Cannon went to Buenos Aires, Argentina, for three years as chief of the U.S. Military Mission. While there, he was promoted to lieutenant colonel in March 1940 and to colonel in January 1941. That October, he went to Mitchel Field, New York as chief of staff of the 1st Air Force, taking command of the 1st Interceptor Command. He was promoted to brigadier general in February 1942.

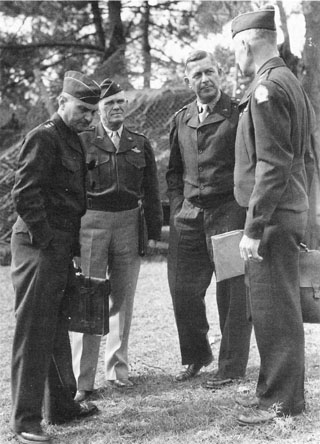
Lieutenant General Ira C. Eaker, Major General John K. Cannon, Lieutenant General Jacob L. Devers, and Major General Thomas B. Larkin, 1944.

During Operation Torch in November 1942, Cannon was the commanding general of the XII Air Support Command for the Western Task Force during the invasion of French Morocco. He moved to Algeria as commanding general of the XII Bomber Command. Through March and April 1943, General Cannon organized and commanded the Northwest African Training Command in the Northwest African Air Forces of the Mediterranean Air Command (MAC), the official Allied air force command organization in the Mediterranean Theater. In May 1943, Cannon became deputy commanding general of the Northwest African Tactical Air Force under Commander Air Marshal Sir Arthur Coningham for the Sicilian campaign and the invasion of Italy. He was promoted to major general in June and after MAC was disbanded in December, became commanding general of both the Twelfth Air Force and the Mediterranean Allied Tactical Air Force in the newly organized Mediterranean Allied Air Forces. General Cannon was responsible for all air operations during the invasion of southern France in August 1944 (Operation Dragoon). In March 1945, he was promoted to lieutenant general and named air commander in chief of all Allied Air Forces in the Mediterranean Theater of Operations. In May 1945, Lt. Gen. John K. Cannon became commanding general of U.S. Air Forces in Europe USAFE.

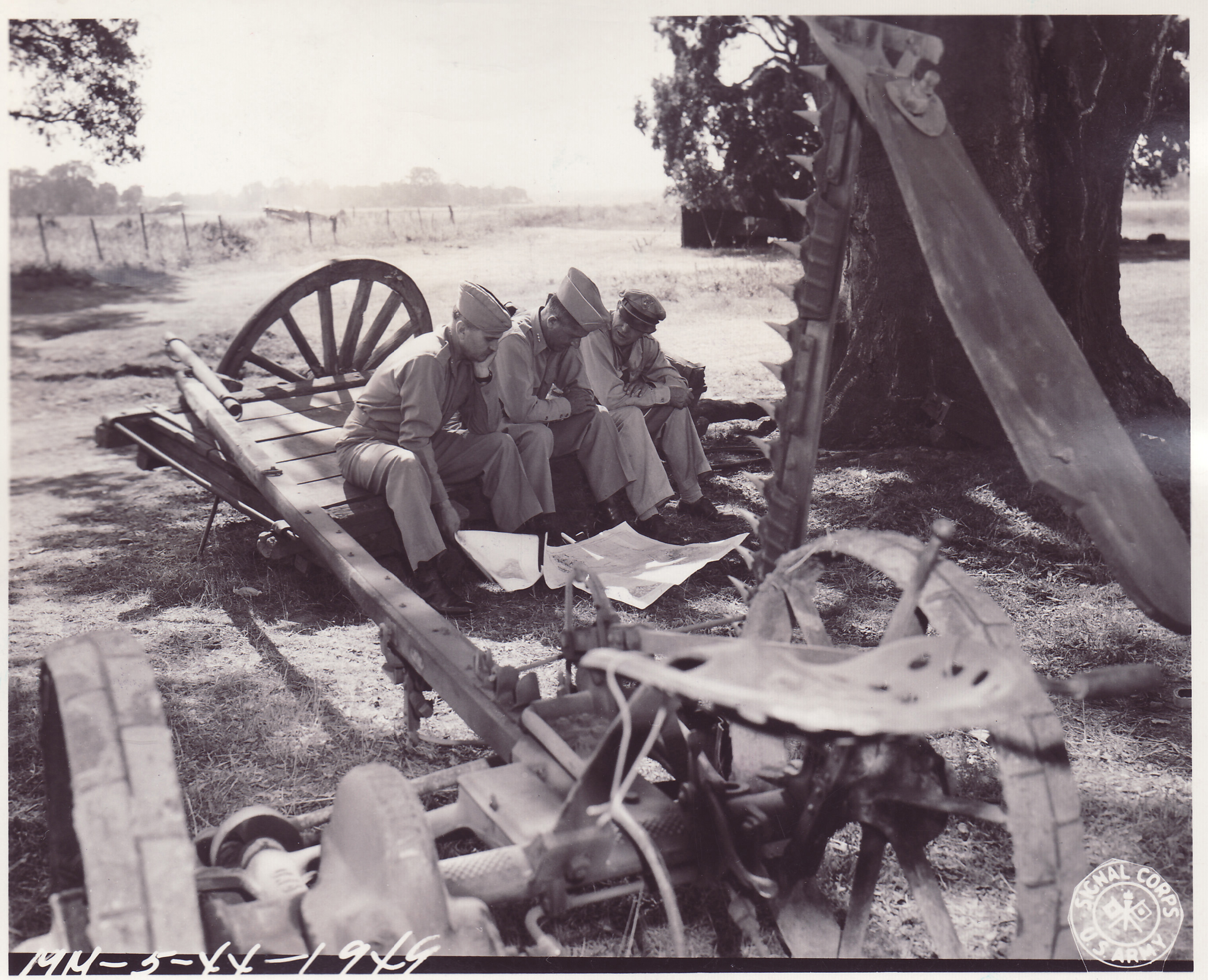
Generals Saville, Devers, and Cannon planning operations on Corsica in 1944.

He earned four Distinguished Service Medals, Legion of Merit, Bronze Star, Air Medal and decorations from Great Britain, France, Italy, Poland, Yugoslavia and Morocco.

General Cannon returned to the U.S. in April 1946 as commanding general of Air Training Command at Barksdale Field, Louisiana. In October 1948, he returned to Europe as commanding general of U.S. Air Forces in Europe and in March 1950 was designated commander-in-chief of U.S. Air Forces in Europe. On October 29, 1951, he was promoted to general and appointed commanding general of Tactical Air Command at Langley Air Force Base, Virginia.

General Cannon retired from the service on March 31, 1954. At the time of his retirement, he was senior air officer in point-of-service, holding serial number 3A.

He died of a heart attack on January 12, 1955, at his home in Arcadia, California. He is buried in Arlington National Cemetery.

== Honors and awards ==
On 8 June 1957, the Clovis Air Force Base in Clovis, New Mexico was renamed Cannon Air Force Base in honor of General Cannon.

The Arnold Air Society Squadron at Utah State University is named the John K. Cannon Squadron in honor of his achievements and alumni status.

== Effective dates of promotion ==
Cannon was honorably discharged September 23, 1919 at the grade of first lieutenant and returned to duty at that grade on July 1, 1920.

Insignia	Rank	Date
	General	October 29, 1951
	Lieutenant general	March 17, 1945
	Major general	June 2, 1943
	Brigadier general	February 27, 1942
	Colonel	January 9, 1941
	Lieutenant colonel	March 11, 1940
	Major	March 16, 1935
	Captain	August 8, 1929
	First lieutenant	July 1, 1920
	Second lieutenant	November 27, 1917

== See also ==
- List of commanders of Tactical Air Command
- List of commanders of USAFE
