= Northwest African Photographic Reconnaissance Wing =

- Active: 18 February 1943 – 10 December 1943
- Role: Photoreconnaissance
- Part of: Northwest African Air Forces

The Northwest African Photographic Reconnaissance Wing (NAPRW) was a composite Allied photographic reconnaissance wing operational in North Africa during World War II in 1943.

== History ==
NAPRW was a sub-command of the Northwest African Air Forces which itself was a sub-command of the Mediterranean Air Command (MAC). These new Allied air force organizations were created at the Casablanca Conference in January 1943 to promote cooperation between the British Royal Air Force (RAF), the American United States Army Air Force (USAAF), and their respective ground and naval forces in North Africa and the Mediterranean Theater of Operations (MTO). Effective 18 February 1943, the NAPRW and other MAC commands existed until 10 December 1943 when MAC was disbanded and the Mediterranean Allied Air Forces (MAAF), with the Mediterranean Allied Photographic Reconnaissance Wing (MAPRW), were established. Colonel Elliott Roosevelt, the son of United States President Franklin D. Roosevelt, attended the Casablanca Conference and was made the commander of NAPRW. Lt. Col. Roosevelt had been the commander of the U.S. 3rd Reconnaissance Group, which had participated in the landings in North Africa in November 1942. RAF Wing Commander Eric Fuller was Col. Roosevelt's deputy.

One reason for the creation of the NAPRW was the grave attrition of the constituent units prior to February 1943. NAPRW was headquartered at Maison Blanche Airport outside Algiers, and deployed units to outlying bases including Malta. Under the pressure of events, the squadron structure had broken down, and it was not reconstituted until the German surrender in Tunis in May 1943. At that time, NAPRW HQ moved to el-Aouina Airport outside Carthage. After the landings in Italy, the Wing moved to San Severo near Foggia, Italy, in November. Numerous other airfields were used, and wing aircraft ranged throughout the Mediterranean from Barcelona to Budapest.

The 3rd PR Group contributed early model F-4 Lightnings and a mapping detachment equipped with four Boeing B-17Fs. These aircraft were found to be unsuitable for combat operations and were relegated to other duties. NAPRW found that only the later model F-4Bs and F-5 Lightnings, with their flaws corrected, could operate in enemy airspace. NAPRW did important pioneering work in night photography using a single assigned North American B-25 Mitchell. The RAF contributed PR Spitfires and a few early de Havilland Mosquitos. Colonel Roosevelt borrowed two Mosquitos from the British, and began a campaign for American adoption of this aircraft; however, when a few new F-8 Mosquitos did get allocated to NAPRW from Canadian production, they turned out to be problem-plagued. During the first half of 1943, the Wing also flew a single Potez 540, a war prize modified to serve as a flying photo processing laboratory.

From its operational nadir in February 1943, NAPRW grew to become a very large unit with nearly 3,000 men, and relative combat losses declined rapidly during its existence. Because NAPRW was the first U.S.-led reconnaissance wing to see sustained combat in Europe, its operational experience set the tone for subsequent American operations; this was why Col. Roosevelt was tagged to command the Eighth Air Force's 325th Reconnaissance Wing in England at the end of 1943. President Roosevelt inspected his son's wing at El Aouina in November 1943 during his travel to the Teheran Conference.

The successor unit was the "Mediterranean Allied Photo Reconnaissance Wing"

== Order of battle ==
At the time of the Allied invasion of Sicily (Operation Husky) on 10 July 1943, the NAPRW consisted of:

- 3rd Photographic Group under Lieutenant Colonel Frank Dunn
  - 5th Combat Mapping Squadron, P-38 Lightning
  - 12th Photographic Reconnaissance Squadron, P-38 Lightning
  - 12th Weather Detachment
  - 15th Photographic Reconnaissance Squadron, B-17 Fortress
  - 13th Photographic Reconnaissance Squadron (Detachment) Photo Intelligence
- No. 60 Squadron SAAF Detachment, Mosquito PR.IV
- No. 540 Squadron RAF Detachment, Mosquito PR.IV/PR.XI
- No. 680 Squadron RAF, Spitfire PR.IX/PR.XI
- 2/33 Groupe (Free French Air Force), P-38 Lightning

== Notable personnel ==
Antoine de Saint-Exupéry, the renowned French aviator and author of several aviation writings as well as The Little Prince, was a P-38 pilot in 2/33 Groupe de Reconnaissance. Saint-Exupéry flew a few missions with NAPRW before being grounded. He later was allowed to fly with MAPRW and failed to return to his base at Borgo, Corsica following a reconnaissance mission on 31 July 1944 and is believed to have died at that time.

USAAF Colonel Karl Polifka, who arrived in theater from the Pacific in October 1943, was one of the most aggressive and most highly regarded reconnaissance pilots of the war. He succeeded Roosevelt in command.

Wing Commander Adrian Warburton DSO, DFC & two bars, perhaps Britain's most notable reconnaissance pilot of the war, flew for NAPRW in 1943, especially in missions from RAF Luqa, Malta.
