= Harry Barton (footballer) =

English footballer

Personal information
- Date of birth: 1874
- Place of birth: Northwich, England
- Date of death: 1954 (aged 79–80)
- Position: Winger

Senior career*
| Years | Team | Apps | (Gls) |
| 1895–1896 | Castle True Blues | | |
| 1896–1897 | Fairfield | | |
| 1897 | Grimsby Town | 3 | (1) |
| 1898–1899 | Witton Albion | | |
| 1899–1900 | Middlewich Athletic Rangers | | |
| 1900–1901 | Northwich Victoria | | |
| 1901–1902 | Watford | | |
| 1902–190? | Witton Albion | | |
- * Club domestic league appearances and goals

Harry Barton (1874–1954) was an English professional footballer who played as a winger.
