= Northwest African Air Service Command =

The Northwest African Air Service Command (NAASC) was a sub-command of the Northwest African Air Forces which itself was a sub-command of the Mediterranean Air Command (MAC). These new Allied air force organizations were created at the Casablanca Conference in January 1943 to promote cooperation between the British Royal Air Force (RAF), the American United States Army Air Force (USAAF), and their respective ground and naval forces in the North African and Mediterranean Theater of Operations (MTO). Effective 4 March 1943, Brigadier General Delmar Dunton became the commander of NAASC which consisted of service units from the United States Army 12th Air Force Service Command which Dunton had overseen since 30 September 1942, and similar units from the British RAF Middle East Command. In June 1943, prior to the invasion of Sicily (Operation Husky), Brigadier General Harold Bartron became the commander of NAASC. On 10 December 1943, MAC was disbanded and NAASC was reorganized in the newly established Mediterranean Allied Air Forces.
