= 1st Special Operations Component Maintenance Squadron =

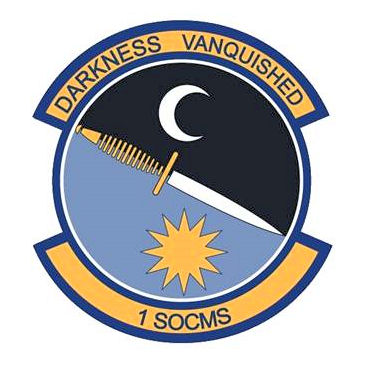
- Emblem of the 1st Special Operations Component Maintenance Squadron
- Active: 1941-present
- Country: United States
- Branch: United States Air Force
- Role: Aircraft Maintenance

The 1st Special Operations Component Maintenance Squadron is an active United States Air Force unit. Its current assignment is with the 1st Special Operations Maintenance Group, based at Eglin Aux Air Field #9 (Hurlburt Field), Florida.

== Overview ==
The 1st Special Operations Component Maintenance Squadron (SOCMS) is responsible for organizational and all intermediate level maintenance on 141 different avionic, electronic warfare, sensor, electrical, pneudraulic, fuel and engine maintenance systems, specifically AC-130 gunships, MC-130H Combat Talon IIs, MC-130P Combat Shadows and MH-53J/M PAVE LOW III/IV helicopters assigned to the 1st Special Operations Wing. Technical support is provided on Communication/navigation, guidance and control, sensor, electronic warfare, pneudraulics, electrics and fuel systems, engines and propellers.

The squadron's unique repair capabilities cover the entire range—from vacuum tube, solid state and infrared components, to laser and fiber optic technology. In addition to maintenance for the wing's operational and transient aircraft, the squadron performs test and development work for ongoing acquisitions in support of Air Force Special Operations Command, U.S. Special Operations Command and the Department of Defense.

== History ==
=== Lineage ===
- Constituted 1st Depot Repair Squadron on 1 October 1933

Activated on 1 January 1941
Inactivated on 6 November 1945
Disbanded on 15 June 1983

- Reconstituted, and redesignated, 1st Special Operations Component Repair Squadron on 21 September 1992

Activated on 22 September 1992
Inactivated on 1 October 1993
Redesignated 1st Special Operations Component Maintenance Squadron on 15 November 2006
Activated on 16 November 2006.

=== Assignments ===
- 1st Air Depot Group, France Field, Canal Zone, 1 January 1941
- VI Air Force Service Command, 10 June 1944
- San Antonio Air Technical Service Command, 19 December 1944
- 23rd Air Depot Group, 26 March 1945
- San Antonio Air Technical Service Command, 23 May-6 November 1945
- 1st Special Operations Logistics Group, 22 September 1992 – 1 October 1993
- 1st Special Operations Maintenance Group, 16 November 2006–present

=== Stations ===
- France Field, Canal Zone, 1 January 1941
- Albrook Field, Canal Zone, by 6 May 1943 – 7 December 1944
- Kelly Field, Texas, 19 December 1944 – 10 August 1945
- Fort Lawton, Washington, 15 August-1 September 1945
- Kelly Field, Texas, 21 September-6 November 1945
- Eglin Aux Air Field #9(Hurlburt Field), Florida, 22 September 1992 – 1 October 1993
- Eglin Aux Air Field #9(Hurlburt Field), Florida, 16 November 2006–present
