= Northwest African Training Command =

The Northwest African Training Command (NATC) was a sub-command of the Northwest African Air Forces (NAAF) which itself was a sub-command of the Mediterranean Air Command (MAC). These new Allied air force organizations were created at the Casablanca Conference in January 1943 to promote cooperation between the British Royal Air Force (RAF), the American United States Army Air Force (USAAF), and their respective ground and naval forces in the North African and Mediterranean Theater of Operations (MTO). Effective February 18, 1943, the NATC and other MAC commands existed until December 10, 1943, when MAC was disbanded and the Mediterranean Allied Air Forces (MAAF) were established.

Brigadier General John Cannon organized and commanded NATC to provide pre-combat flight training for new pilots and crews. Many of the bomber and fighter groups of NAAF were assigned to Cannon's NATC for a brief but highly effective training period prior to their ultimate combat assignments. Some of the groups trained by NATC before the Allied invasion of Sicily (Operation Husky) on July 10, 1943, are indicated below.

Northwest African Training Command
Brigadier General John Cannon

NATC-Trained Units	Training Dates	Assignment
14th Fighter Group	February 18 – March 14, 1943	NASAF
27th Fighter Group	February 18 - May 27, 1943	NATAF
2nd Bombardment Group	April, 1943	NASAF
86th Bomber Group (Dive)	May 11 - June 29, 1943	NATAF
99th Pursuit Squadron	-	NATAF
^154th Weather Reconnaissance; Squadron (Medium)	May 24 - September 1, 1943	-
^63rd Reconnaissance Squadron (Long Range, Weather)	May 24 - September 1, 1943	-

Notes:
^These reconnaissance squadrons were likely permanent assignments to NATC.

To establish an effective training command, Cannon and Lieutenant General Carl Spaatz, commander of NAAF, arranged a meeting with the Commanding General of the United States Army Air Forces (USAAF), General Henry H. Arnold to consider their recommendation of Philip Cochran as a teacher and trainer of raw fighter pilots. Cochran was unanimously approved and contributed most effectively to the combat performance of many NAAF pilots. The comic strips Terry and the Pirates and Steve Canyon by Milton Caniff were partly inspired by Philip Cochran who was a friend of Caniff.

In 1942, Colonel Charles D. Jones was General Cannon's Assistant A-3 (Operations) Officer. After the Allied air force reorganization and the creation of NATC in early 1943, Jones took charge of a school in French Morocco that trained American fighter pilots and aviators in the Free French Air Force. In 1944, Jones became the commanding officer of the 340th Bombardment Group until he was shot down on March 10, 1944, and spent the rest of the war as a prisoner in Germany.
