= Harold Bartron =

United States Air Force general (1896–1975)

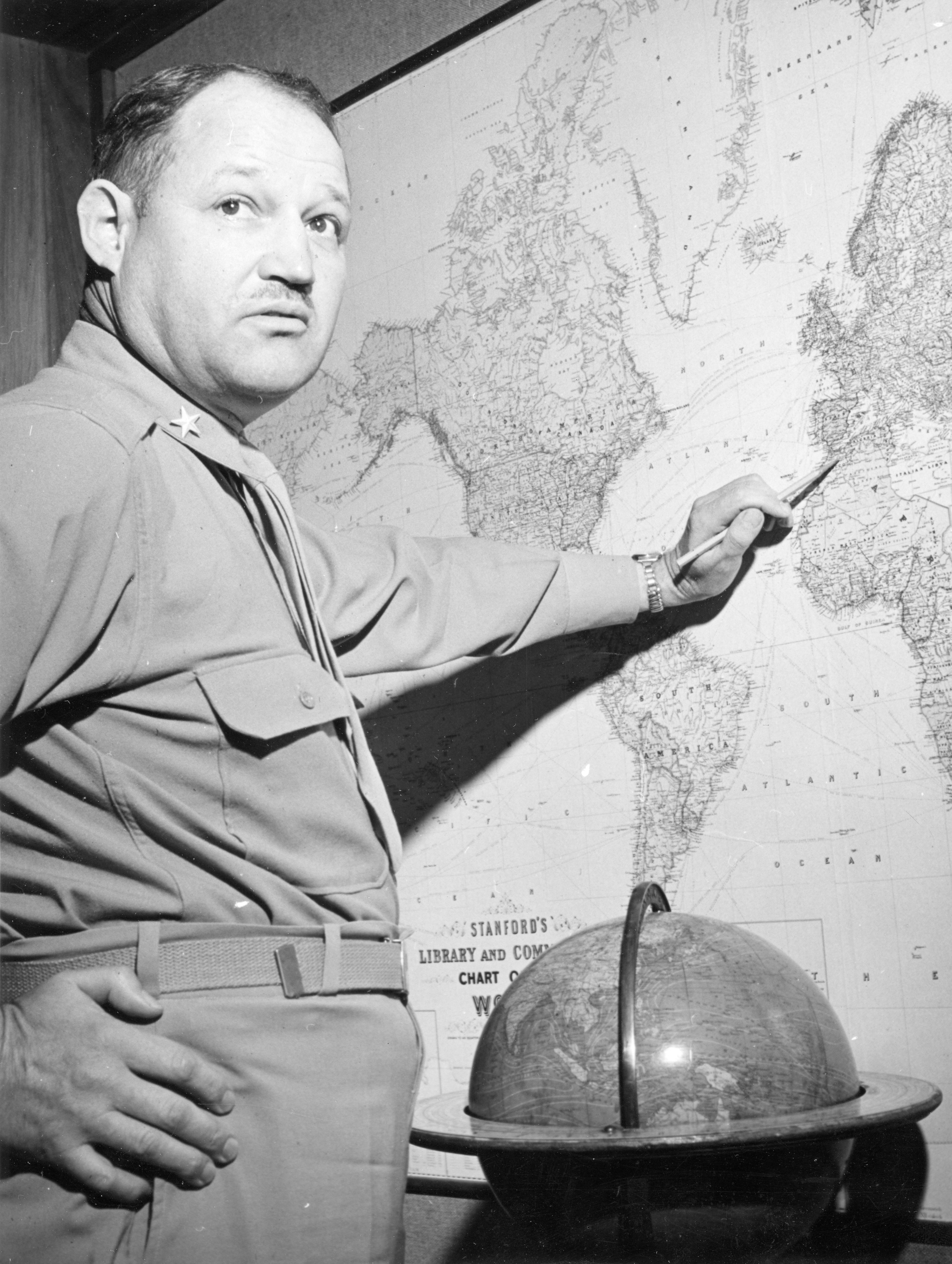
- Brigadier General Harold A. Bartron
- Born: September 17, 1896; Frankfort, Indiana
- Died: June 1, 1975 (aged 78); Riverside, California
- Military career
- Allegiance: United States of America
- Branch: United States Air Force
- Rank: Brigadier general

Harold Arthur Bartron (September 17, 1896 – June 1, 1975) was a brigadier general in the United States Air Force.

== Biography ==
Enlisting as a private in the United States Marine Corps in the fall of 1912, he was discharged four years later in that grade.

When World War I broke out Bartron was admitted to the first officers training camp at Fort Benjamin Harrison, Indiana, early in April 1917, and was transferred shortly thereafter to Columbus, Ohio, where he was a member of the third ground school class in preliminary training for an aviation career. Upon graduation he was sent to the overseas detachment in New York, having been discharged as a candidate, and enlisted in the Aviation Section of the Signal Corps for flying training.

Going to England in September 1917, Bartron received additional ground instruction at Oxford prior to flying training. His flying training in France consisted of primary training at Tours and advanced training at Issodoun before he graduated in the first class of the American gunnery school at St. Johns De Monte, France. Joining the 13th Squadron of the Second Pursuit Group after completing his training, he remained with it until the cessation of hostilities, returned to the United States, and was honorably discharged as a first lieutenant in February 1919.

Appointed a second lieutenant in the Air Service, Regular Army, in July 1920, after a short tour of duty at Fort Sill, Oklahoma, Bartron was ordered to Patterson Field, Ohio, moving to Kelly Field, Texas, in 1929, and then Randolph Field, Texas. From there he was sent to the Air Corps Tactical School at Maxwell Field, Ala., graduating in 1939, and then served at March Field, Calif., and the Panama Air Depot in 1939.

Two years later Bartron was transferred to Waller Field, Trinidad, and six months later he went to Losey Field, Puerto Rico. In October 1942 he joined the invasion force on the West Coast of North Africa, landing in November 1942, and assumed command of the First Area Northwest African Air Service Command. He was transferred to Constantine in April 1943, and later moved to Tunis. That June he was appointed to command the Air Service Command, Northwest African Theater. With the invasion of southern Italy he moved to Bari, Italy, and later Naples, remaining there until August 1944 when he returned to the United States.

Assuming command of the Fairfield Air Technical Service Command, in November 1945 he became commanding general of San Bernardino Air Technical Service Command. In August 1947 he was assigned to Air Materiel Command headquarters, Dayton, Ohio.

His decorations include the Legion of Merit, and he was rated a command pilot and combat observer.
