= Structure of the Egyptian Air Force =

The structure of the Egyptian Air Force, is described below.

Air bases of the Egyptian Air Force: Egyptian Air Force bases

== World War II ==
By June 1940 at the beginning of the Western Desert Campaign, the Royal Egyptian Air Force comprised:

- 1 Squadron (Egypt) with Westland Lysander II
- 2 Squadron (Egypt) with Gloster Gladiator II
- 3 Squadron (Egypt) and 4 Squadron (Egypt) with Avro 626s and Avro 674s respectively
- 5 Squadron (Egypt) with Gloster Gladiator II

== Air bases ==
- Abu Sultan Air Base
- Abu Suweir Air Base
- Al Khatatbah Air Base
- Al Mansurah Air Base
- Almaza Air Base
- Aswan Air Base at Aswan International Airport
- Az Zaqaziq Air Base
- Beni Suef Air Base
- Bilbays Air Base
- Bir Gifgafa Airfield
- Borg-el-Arab/Intl Air Base at Borg El Arab International Airport
- Cairo/Intl Air Base at Cairo International Airport
- Cairo West Air Base
- Dakhla Air Base
- Daraw Air Base
- El Alamein Air Base at El Alamein International Airport
- El Arish Air Base at El Arish International Airport
- El Minya Air Base
- Fayid Air Base
- Gebel el Basur Air Base (Berigat)
- Habata Air Base
- Hurghada Air Base at Hurghada International Airport
- Inchas Air Base
- Ismailia Air Base
- Jiyanklis Air Base
- Kibrit Air Base
- Kom Awshim Air Base
- Mersha Matruh Air Base at Marsa Matruh International Airport
- Quwaysina Air Base
- Ras Banas Air Base within Ras Banas
- Uthman Air Base
- Wadi Abu Rish Air Base
- Wadi al Jandali Air Base

Reserve bases

- Abu Simbel Airport - no units
- Al Raymaniyah Air Base - no units
- As Salihiyah Air Base - no units
- Bir Abu Rahal Air Base - no units
- Misheifa Air Base - no units
- Sidi Barrani Air Base - reserve
- Wadi Abu Shihat Air Base - reserve

== Order of battle ==
Data from

- 102 Tactical Fighter Wing (Mersa Matruh)
  - 25 Squadron - Inshas (EMB-312 Tucano)
  - 26 Squadron – Ismaïlia (+Milaz) (AT-802 Air Tractor)
  - 35 Squadron - Hurghada (EMB-312 Tucano)
- 104 Tactical Fighter Wing
  - 42 Squadron - Wadi Abu Rish (MiG-29M2)
  - 44 Squadron - Wadi Abu Rish (MiG-29M2)
  - Aviation Training Center (MiG-29M2)
- 252 Tactical Fighter Wing' (Gebel el Basur Air Base)
  - 82 Squadron - Gebel el Basur (Mirage 2000)
- 282 Tactical Fighter Wing (Fayid)
  - 86th TFS – Fayid (F-16C/D)
  - 88th TFS – Fayid (F-16C/D)
- 601 Air Wing (Cairo West Air Base)
  - 87 Squadron – Cairo/West (E-2C)
- 292 Tactical Fighter Wing
  - 95 Squadron – Cairo West Air Base (F-16C/D B52)
  - 97 Squadron – Cairo West Air Base (F-16C/D B52)
- .. 601 ECM Brigade
  - 80 Squadron – Kom Awshim (Teledyne UAV)
- 272 Tactical Fighter Wing
  - 75 Squadron – Gianaclis (F-16C/D)
  - 77 Squadron – Gianaclis (F-16C/D)
  - 79 Squadron – Gianaclis (F-16C/D)
- 232 Tact Fighter Wing
  - 72 Squadron – Mersa Matruh (F-16A/B)
  - 74 Squadron – Mersa Matruh (F-16A/B)
- 252 Tactical Fighter Wing
  - 82 Squadron – Gebel El Basur (Mir.2000)
- 203 Tactical Fighter Wing
  - 34 Squadron – Gebel El Basur (Rafale)
  - 36 Squadron - Gebel El Basur (Rafale)
  - 84 Squadron - Gebel El Basur (Rafale)
- 242 Tact Fighter Wing
  - 68 Squadron – Aswan (F-16C/D)
  - 70 Squadron – Beni Sueif (F-16C/D)
- 262 Tact Fighter Wing
  - 60 Squadron – Abu Suweir (F-16C/D)
  - 64 Squadron – Abu Suweir (F-16C/D)
- 308 Tactical Fighter Wing CAS
  - 56 Squadron – El Minya (Alpha Jet)
  - 57 Squadron – El Minya (Alpha Jet)
- 546 Air Wing
  - 12 Squadron - Almaza (Commando)
  - 18 Squadron – Almaza (A109EMS, AW139SAR, AW189VIP)
  - 21 Squadron – Almaza (S-71)
- 548 Air Wing
  - 10 Squadron – Kibrit (SA-342)
  - 15 Squadron – Kibrit (SA-342)
  - 17 Squadron – Kibrit (SA-342)
- 547 Air Wing
  - 13 Squadron – Sidi Barrani (Mi-17)
  - 55 Squadron - Khatatba (Mi-17)
  - 91 Squadron - Ismailia (Mi-17)
- HQ Egyptian Air Force
  - 33 Squadron - Inshas (CH-47F)
  - 38 Squadron - Almaza (Beech 1900)
  - 99 Squadron - Almaza (Falcon 50)
- 101 Air Brigade
  - 3 Squadron – Bilbeis (Grob 115EG)
  - 5 Squadron – Bilbeis (Grob 115EG)
- 301 Air Wing
  - 30 Squadron – Abu Sultan (SA342)
  - 54 Squadron - Bilbeis (SA342)
  - 56 Squadron – Abu Sultan (SA342)
- 549 Air Wing
  - 40 Squadron – Wadi el Jandali (Ka-52E)
  - 41 Squadron – Wadi al Jandali (Ka-52E)
  - 43 Squadron - Borg al Arab (Mi-24V)
  - 45 Squadron – Wadi al Jandali (Ka-52E)
- 550 Attack Heli Brigade
  - 51 Squadron – Az Zaqaziq (AH-64D)
  - 52 Squadron – Az Zagaziq (AH-64D)
  - 53 Squadron – Az Zaqaziq (AH-64D)
- 516 Air Wing
  - 4 Squadron – Cairo East (C-130H)
  - 16 Squadron – Cairo East (C-130H)
  - Indep. Flight - Cairo East (IL-76MF)
- 533 Air Wing
  - 2 Squadron - Cairo East (C-295M)
  - 8 Squadron – Cairo East (C-295M, An-74T-200)
- Air Force Academy – 201 Air Wing
  - 28 Squadron – Bilbeis (K-8E)
  - 29 Squadron – Bilbeis (K-8E)
  - Demo Team Silverstars – Bilbeis (K-8E)
- 770th Tact Fighter Wing
  - 94 Squadron – As Salihiya (K-8E)
  - 98 Squadron – As Salihiya (K-8E)
- 544 Air Wing
  - 9 Squadron - Beni Sueif (Mi-17)
  - 81 Squadron – Daraw (Mi-17)
  - 83 Squadron - Bernice (Mi-17)
- 545 Air Wing Wing
  - 11 Squadron – Borg al Arab (AW149 SAR)
  - 14 Squadron – Borg al Arab (AW149)
  - 37 Squadron – Borg al Arab (SH-2G)
- 700th Air Wing
  - 6 Squadron – Uthman (E-June)
- 700 Air Wing Wing
  - 20 Squadron – Uthman (Wing Loong II)
  - 22 Squadron – Uthman (Wing Loong II)
  - 24 Squadron – El Arish (Wing Loong II)
