= Inchas Air Base =

Egyptian Air Force Base

Inchas Air Base Anchas Air Base Inshas Air Base
- Sharqia Governorate in Egypt

Site information
- Owner: Egyptian Armed Forces
- Operator: Egyptian Air Force

Location
- Shown within Egypt
- Coordinates: 30°19′47″N 31°27′00″E

Site history
- Built: 1947
- In use: 1947 - present

Inchas Air Base, also known as Anchas Air Base and Inshas Air Base, is an Egyptian Air Force base located in Sharqia Governorate, Egypt.

== History ==
In 1947, Inchas Airfield was constructed intended for private use by King Farouk. In 1954, the airfield was taken over by the Egyptian Air Force (EAF), and was gradually improved over the years. It operated as an auxiliary field for jet fighters, light transports and liaison aircraft. During the Suez Crisis in 1956, Inchas Airfield was attacked by Hawker Sea Hawks of 810 Naval Air Squadron, Fleet Air Arm, operating from HMS Bulwark (R08), leaving multiple MiG fighters scorched. Following the Suez Crisis, Mikoyan-Gurevich MiG-15 and Mikoyan-Gurevich MiG-17 fighter aircraft began operating from the airfield. In 1957, runway NE/SW was lengthened and new taxiways were built. By 1958, the airfield consisted of 3 runways, NE/SW measuring 8,100 x 120 ft, N/S measuring 5,400 x 120 ft, and E/W measuring 5,400 x 120, all of which were built with macadam. There was a single concrete hangar. In June 1958, the airfield was reported to house 16 Ilyushin Il-28, 8 Mig-17s, 10 MiG-15s, and 6 aircraft crates.

By the late 1960s, Inchas Airfield operated as a primary fighter base of the EAF under Soviet command, mainly operating Mikoyan-Gurevich MiG-21 aircraft. By 1967, the airfield consisted of 3 runways, NE/SW measuring 8,325 x 130 ft consisting of blacktop and concrete, N/S measuring 5,985 x 130 ft consisting of blacktop, and E/W measuring 5,815 x 125 ft consisting of blacktop. On 1 January 1967, the airfield was reported to host a total of 24 MiG-21 aircraft, which included 12 assigned to the 19th Fighter Squadron along with a further 12 assigned to an unidentified squadron. During the Six-Day War, which began on 5 June 1967, Inchas Airfield was attacked by Israeli forces. The mission left 20 destroyed aircraft, a partially destroyed hangar, and 9 bomb craters in the runways. By 1970, sand-camouflaged hardened aircraft shelters was constructed at the airfield, designed to accommodate the MiG-21J interceptor.

=== Present ===
In early 2023, plans were made to renovate Inchas Air Base to prepare it as a beddown location for new Boeing CH-47F Chinook heavy-lift helicopters, as the base no longer permanently hosts aircraft. The improvements included a new maintenance hangar capable of servicing up to four CH-47s simultaneously, expansion of the apron, renovation of water, wastewater, lighting and utilities on the airfield, and the extension of taxiways and access roads.

== See also ==
- Structure of the Egyptian Air Force
