= 53 Squadron =

53 Squadron may refer to:

- No. 53 Squadron PAF, Pakistan
- No. 53 Squadron RAF, United Kingdom
- 53 Squadron, Egypt; see structure of the Egyptian Air Force
- 53rd Squadron, Qatar Emiri Air Force
- 53rd Fighter Squadron "Warhawks", Romania
- 53d Aero Squadron, Air Service, United States Army; see list of American aero squadrons
- 53rd Airlift Squadron, United States Air Force
- 53rd Fighter Squadron, United States Air Force
- 53rd Space Operations Squadron, United States Space Force
- 53rd Weather Reconnaissance Squadron, United States Air Force
- VF-53, United States Navy
