= Wadi Abu Rish Air Base =

Air base of the Egyptian Air Force

Wadi Abu Rish Air Base
- Arabic: قاعدة وادي أبو الريش الجوية
- Biba, Beni Suef Governorate in Egypt

Site information
- Type: Air Base
- Owner: Ministry of Defense (Egypt)
- Operator: Egyptian Air Force

Location
- Shown within Egypt
- Coordinates: 28°58′30″N 031°41′56″E

Airfield information
- Elevation: 329 metres (1,079 ft) AMSL
Runways
Direction	Length and surface
01L/19R	3,985 metres (13,074 ft) Asphalt
01R/19L	3,985 metres (13,074 ft) Asphalt

Wadi Abu Rish Air Base is an Air base of the Egyptian Air Force located 43 miles (69 km) east of Biba, Beni Suef Governorate, Egypt.

The base is home to 42 Squadron which flies the Mikoyan MiG-29M/M2 as part of 104 Tactical Fighter Wing of 149 Air Division and the Aviation and Training Center which also files the MiG-29M/M2.
