= Biba, Egypt =

Biba ببا
- City
- Location in Egypt
- Coordinates: 28.921782°N 30.984449°E
- Country: Egypt
- Governorate: Beni Suef

Area
  - Total: 192.1 km^{2} (74.2 sq mi)
- Elevation: 29 m (95 ft)

Population (2023)
  - Total: 528,065
  - Density: 2,749/km^{2} (7,120/sq mi)
- Time zone: UTC+2 (EET)
  - Summer (DST): UTC+3 (EEST)

Biba (Arabic: ببا; Coptic: ⲡⲁⲡⲟ) is a city in Beni Suef Governorate, Egypt. It contains a cathedral that dates back to the sixth century, although the building that stands today was built in the 19th century.

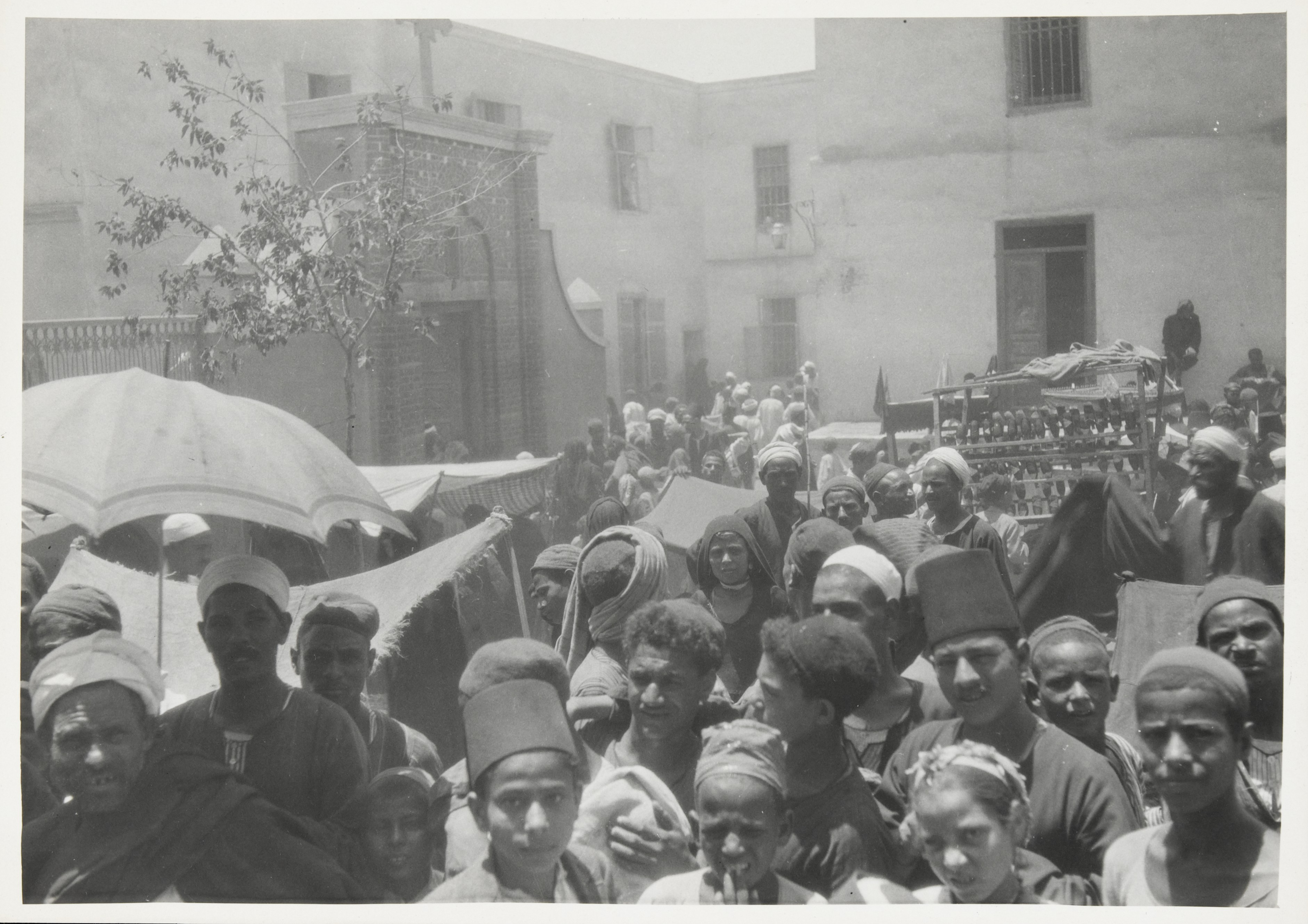
Pilgrims in the church of Saint George in Biba

The city was called Papa or Papa Megale (Ancient Greek: Παπα Μεγάλη) in Ptolemaic and Byzantine Egypt.

== See also ==
- List of cities and towns in Egypt
