= Gebel el Basur Air Base =

Air base of the Egyptian Air Force

Gebel el Basur Air Base
- Arabic: قاعدة جبل الباصور الجوية
- Sadat City, Monufia Governorate in Egypt

Site information
- Type: Air Base
- Owner: Ministry of Defense (Egypt)
- Operator: Egyptian Air Force

Location
- Shown within Egypt
- Coordinates: 30°32′05″N 30°33′40″E

Airfield information
- Elevation: 24 metres (79 ft) AMSL
Runways
Direction	Length and surface
15/33	3,000 metres (9,843 ft) Asphalt
18/36	3,200 metres (10,499 ft) Asphalt

Gebel el Basur Air Base is a Air base of the Egyptian Air Force located north of Sadat City, Monufia Governorate, Egypt.

The base is home to 82 Squadron which flies the Dassault Mirage 2000BM/EM, and part of 252 Tactical Fighter Wing of 139 Air Division, along with 34 Squadron which flies the Dassault Rafale DM/EM as part of 203 Tactical Fighter Wing of 139 Air Division.
