= El Minya Air Base =

El Minya Air Base
- Arabic: قاعدة المنيا الجوية
- Minya, Minya Governorate in Egypt

Site information
- Type: Air Base
- Owner: Ministry of Defense (Egypt)
- Operator: Egyptian Air Force

Location
- Shown within Egypt
- Coordinates: 28°05′42″N 030°44′08″E

Airfield information
- Elevation: 38 metres (125 ft) AMSL
Runways
Direction	Length and surface
16L/34R	2,990 metres (9,810 ft) Asphalt
16R/34L	2,990 metres (9,810 ft) Asphalt

El Minya Air Base is a Air base of the Egyptian Air Force located west of Minya, Minya Governorate, Egypt.

The base is home to the Silver Stars demonstration team which is part of 201 Air Wing of the Egyptian Air Academy flying the Karakorum-8E, 57 and 58 Squadrons flying the Dassault/Dornier Alpha Jet MS1/2 as part of 308 Close Air Support Tactical Wing of 139 Air Division.

== History ==
In the 1950s, a new concrete runway measuring 8200 feet long and 110 feet wide was constructed over the site of the old airfield. A parallel taxiway was also built on the east side with six hardstands.
