= Al Mansurah Air Base =

Air base of the Egyptian Air Force

Al Mansurah Air Base
- قاعدة المنصورة الجوية
- Dakahlia Governorate in Egypt

Site information
- Type: Air Base
- Owner: Ministry of Defense (Egypt)
- Operator: Egyptian Air Force

Location
- Shown within Egypt
- Coordinates: 30°57′54″N 031°25′58″E

Site history
- Built: 1985
- In use: 1985 - present

Airfield information
- Elevation: 4 metres (13 ft) AMSL
Runways
Direction	Length and surface
14/32	2,900 metres (9,514 ft) Asphalt
17/35	2,750 metres (9,022 ft) Asphalt

Al Mansurah Air Base is an Egyptian Air Force airbase located within Dakahlia Governorate, Egypt.

The air base is home to both No. 57 Squadron and No. 58 Squadron as part of 308 Close Air Support Tactical Wing of the 139 Air Division which flies the Dassault/Dornier Alpha Jet MS1/2.
