= Habata Air Base =

Air base of the Egyptian Air Force

Habata Air Base
- Arabic: قاعدة هاباتا الجوية
- Sallum, Matrouh Governorate in Egypt

Site information
- Type: Air Base
- Owner: Ministry of Defense (Egypt)
- Operator: Egyptian Air Force

Location
- Shown within Egypt
- Coordinates: 31°06′27″N 025°27′07″E

Airfield information
- Elevation: 205 metres (673 ft) AMSL
Runways
Direction	Length and surface
16L/34R	3,650 metres (11,975 ft) Asphalt
16R/34L	3,650 metres (11,975 ft) Asphalt

Habata Air Base is an air base of the Egyptian Air Force located southeast of Sallum, Matrouh Governorate, Egypt.

The base is home to 44 Squadron which flies the Mikoyan MiG-29M/M2 of 104 Tactical Fighter Wing of 149 Air Division, alongside 36 Squadron which flies the Dassault Rafale DM/EM of 203 Tactical Fighter Wing of 139 Air Division.
