= Beni Suef Air Base =

Air base of the Egyptian Air Force

Beni Suef Air Base
- قاعدة بني سويف الجوية
- Beni Suef Governorate in Egypt

Site information
- Type: Air Base
- Owner: Ministry of Defense (Egypt)
- Operator: Egyptian Air Force

Location
- Shown within Egypt
- Coordinates: 29°12′43″N 031°00′57″E

Site history
- Built: 1985
- In use: 1985 - present

Airfield information
- Elevation: 28 metres (92 ft) AMSL
Runways
Direction	Length and surface
18L/36R	3,550 metres (11,647 ft) Asphalt
18R/36L	3,550 metres (11,647 ft) Asphalt
05/23	2,935 metres (9,629 ft) Asphalt

Beni Suef Air Base is an Egyptian Air Force airbase located within Beni Suef Governorate, Egypt.

The air base is home to No. 55 Squadron as part of 547 Air Wing of the 119 Air Division which flies the Mil Mi-17V-5. It is also home to No. 70 Squadron which flies the General Dynamics F-16C/D Fighting Falcon as part of 242 Tactical Fighter Wing of 149 Air Division, No. 94 Squadron which flies the Hongdu K-8E of 770 Tactical Fighting Wing of 149 Air Division and a detachment from No. 87 Squadron which flies the Grumman E-2C Hawkeye as part of 601 Air Wing of the 159 Air Division.
