= Wadi al Jandali Air Base =

Wadi al Jandali Air Base
- Arabic: قاعدة وادي الجندلي الجوية
- Badr, Cairo Governorate in Egypt

Site information
- Type: Air Base
- Owner: Ministry of Defense (Egypt)
- Operator: Egyptian Air Force

Location
- Shown within Egypt
- Coordinates: 30°03′01″N 031°50′22″E

Airfield information
- Elevation: 244 metres (801 ft) AMSL
Runways
Direction	Length and surface
01L/19R	3,640 metres (11,942 ft) Asphalt
01R/19L	3,210 metres (10,531 ft) Asphalt

Wadi al Jandali Air Base is a Air base of the Egyptian Air Force located southeast of Badr, Cairo Governorate, Egypt.

The base is home to 40 and 41 Squadrons which both flew the Kamov Ka-52E as part of 549 Air Wing of 129 Air Division.
