= Uthman Air Base =

Uthman Air Base
- Arabic: قاعدة عثمان الجوية
- Siwa Oasis, Matrouh Governorate in Egypt

Site information
- Type: Air Base
- Owner: Ministry of Defense (Egypt)
- Operator: Egyptian Air Force

Location
- Shown within Egypt
- Coordinates: 29°33′20″N 025°35′15″E

Airfield information
- Elevation: 132 metres (433 ft) AMSL
Runways
Direction	Length and surface
11L/29R	2,988 metres (9,803 ft) Asphalt
11R/29L	2,988 metres (9,803 ft) Asphalt
17/35	2,985 metres (9,793 ft) Asphalt

Uthman Air Base is a Air base of the Egyptian Air Force located north of the Siwa Oasis, Matrouh Governorate, Egypt.

The base is home to 26 Squadron with the Air Tractor AT-802, as part of 102 Tactical Air Wing of 149 Air Division, 22 Squadron with CAIG Wing Loong II as part of 702 Air Wing or 129 Air Division and a detachment from 13 Squadron with the Mil Mi-17V-5, part of 547 Air Wing of 119 Air Division.
