= Az Zaqaziq Air Base =

Az Zaqaziq Air Base
- قاعدة الزقازيق الجوية
- Sharqia Governorate in Egypt

Site information
- Type: Air Base
- Owner: Ministry of Defense (Egypt)
- Operator: Egyptian Air Force

Location
- Shown within Egypt
- Coordinates: 30°35′39″N 031°39′58″E

Site history
- Built: 1985
- In use: 1985 - present

Airfield information
- Elevation: 9 metres (30 ft) AMSL
Runways
Direction	Length and surface
18L/36R	3,000 metres (9,843 ft) Asphalt
18R/36L	3,000 metres (9,843 ft) Asphalt

Az Zaqaziq Air Base is an Egyptian Air Force airbase located within Sharqia Governorate, Egypt.

The air base is home to No. 51, 52 and 53 Squadrons as part of 550 Air Wing of the 129 Air Division which flies the Boeing AH-64D Apache.
