= Quwaysina Air Base =

Quwaysina Air Base
- Arabic: قاعدة القويسينا الجوية
- Benha, Qalyubiyya Governorate in Egypt

Site information
- Type: Air Base
- Owner: Ministry of Defense (Egypt)
- Operator: Egyptian Air Force

Location
- Shown within Egypt
- Coordinates: 30°34′46″N 031°07′44″E

Airfield information
- Elevation: 11 metres (36 ft) AMSL
Runways
Direction	Length and surface
16/34	2,790 metres (9,154 ft) Asphalt

Quwaysina Air Base is a Air base of the Egyptian Air Force located 8 miles (13 km) north of Benha, Qalyubiyya Governorate, Egypt.

The base is home to 91 Squadron which flies the Mil Mi-17/Mi-8T helicopters as part of 547 Air Wing of 119 Air Division.
