= Al Khatatbah Air Base =

Al Khatatbah Air Base
- قاعدة الخطاطبة الجوية
- Giza Governorate in Egypt

Site information
- Type: Air Base
- Owner: Ministry of Defense (Egypt)
- Operator: Egyptian Air Force

Location
- Shown within Egypt
- Coordinates: 30°18′40″N 030°52′35″E

Site history
- Built: 1985
- In use: 1985 - present

Airfield information
- Elevation: 11.5 metres (38 ft) AMSL
Helipads
Number	Length and surface
02L-20R	220 metres (722 ft) Asphalt
02R-20L	300 metres (984 ft) Asphalt
11L-29R	380 metres (1,247 ft) Asphalt

Al Khatatbah Air Base is an Egyptian Air Force airbase located within Giza Governorate, Egypt.

The air base is home to No. 13 Squadron as part of 547 Air Wing of the 119 Air Division which flies the Mil Mi-17V-5.
