= Cairo West Air Base =

Egyptian military airport near Cairo

Cairo West Air Base
- Arabic: قاعدة غرب القاهرة الجوية
- Cairo, Cairo Governorate in Egypt
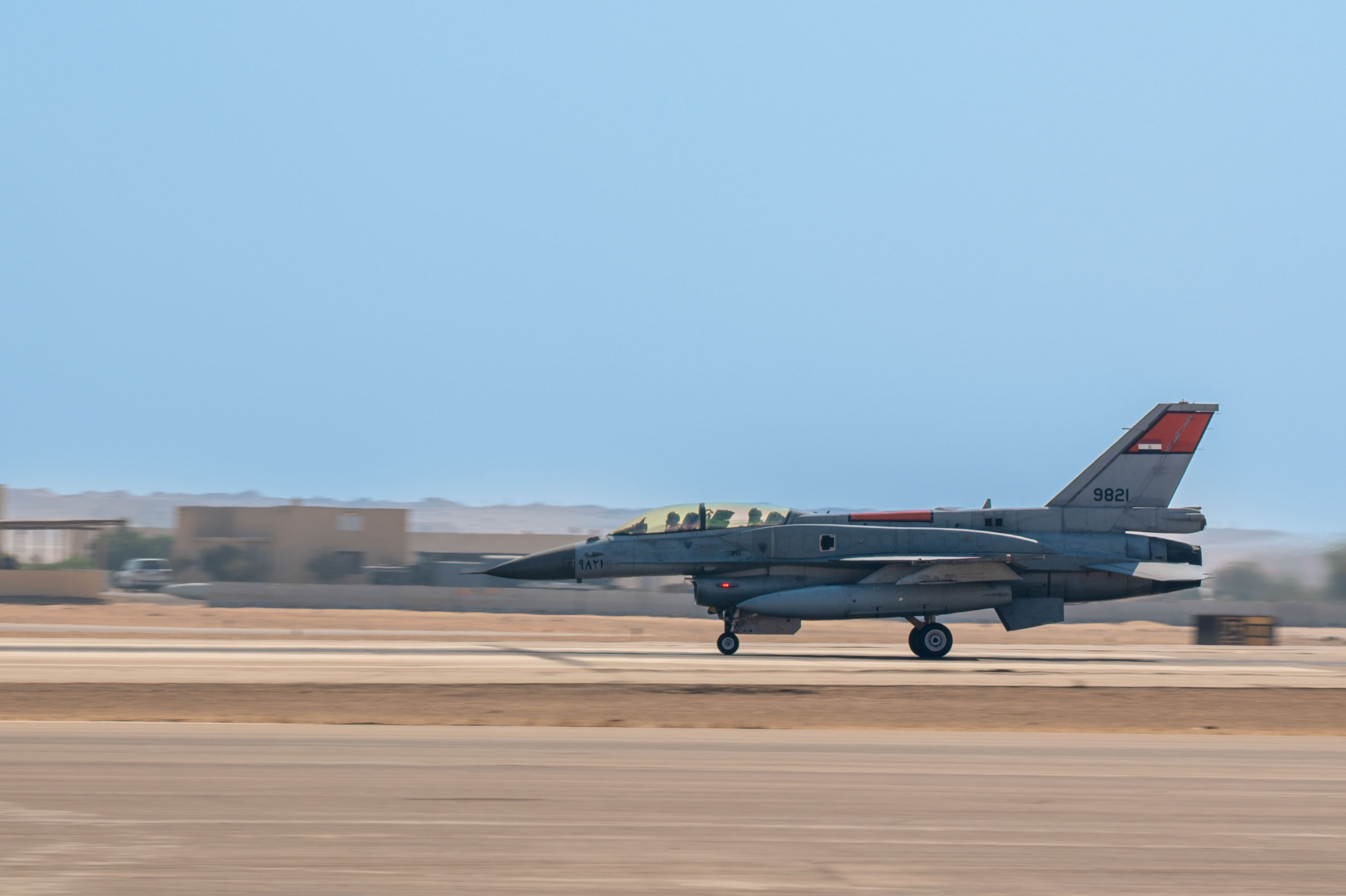
- Egyptian Air Force F-16 at Cairo West Air Base in 2025

Site information
- Type: Air Base
- Owner: Ministry of Defense (Egypt)
- Operator: Egyptian Air Force

Location
- Shown within Egypt
- Coordinates: 30°07′00″N 30°55′00″E

Site history
- Built: 1941
- In use: 1941 - present

Airfield information
- Identifiers: IATA: ~~CWE~~, ICAO: HECW
- Elevation: 168 metres (551 ft) AMSL
Runways
Direction	Length and surface
10/28	2,795 metres (9,170 ft) Asphalt
16/34	2,985 metres (9,793 ft) Asphalt
- Google Maps GCM SkyVector

Cairo West AB (IATA: ~~CWE~~, ICAO: HECW) is a military airport on the western side of Cairo, Egypt. The air base shares some infrastructure with the adjacent Sphinx International Airport.

The base is home to the Egyptian Fighter Weapon School of 139 Air Division, 95 & 97 Squadrons of 292 Tactical Fighter Wing of 139 Air Division with F-16C/D's, 87 Squadron of 601 Air Wing of 159 Air Division with E-2C's and a detachment from 16 Squadron of 516 Air Wing of 159 Air Division with C-130H's.

== History ==
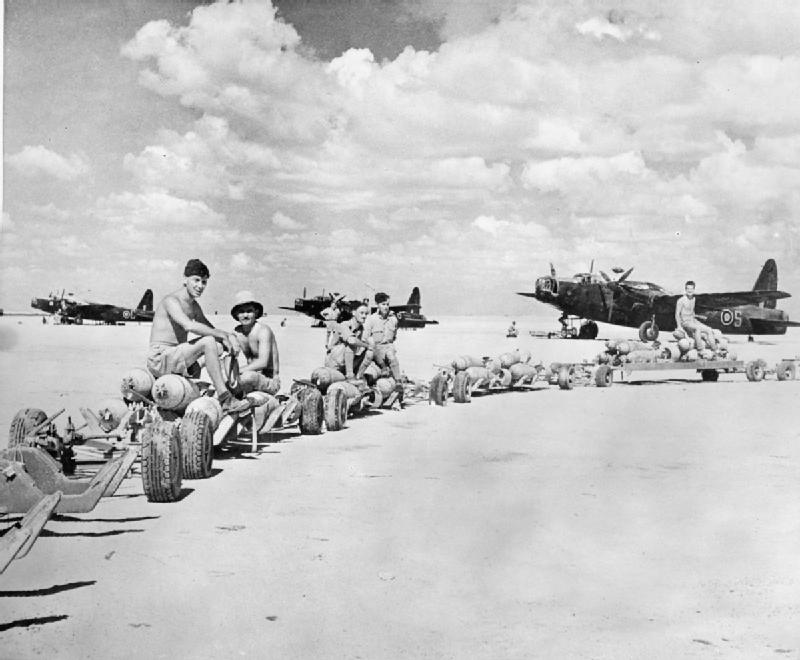
Armourers ride trolley loads of 250-lb GP Bombs to Vickers Wellington IIs of No. 104 Squadron RAF at LG 224/Cairo West, Egypt, before a night operation against enemy columns retreating after the Battle of El Alamein.

Second World War

Originally a Royal Air Force installation ("Landing Ground 224"). No. 104 Squadron RAF flew Vickers Wellington bombers against retreating Axis forces from the base after the Battle of El Alamein. The last RAF unit was No. 620 Squadron RAF's stay from 6 March to 14 June 1946 with the Halifax A.7.

Landing Ground 224

- No. 14 Squadron RAF between 10 and 25 August 1942 with the Bristol Blenheim IV, Martin Baltimore II and Martin Marauder I
- No. 37 Squadron RAF between 26 and 29 June 1942 initially then between 6 and 13 November 1942 with the Vickers Wellington IC
- No. 39 Squadron RAF between 3 and 11 June 1943 with the Bristol Beaufort II
- Detachment from No. 46 Squadron RAF between May 1942 and January 1943 with the Bristol Beaufighter IF
- No. 70 Squadron RAF between 26 and 29 June 1942 then between 6 and 11 November 1942 with the Wellington IC
- Detachment from No. 76 Squadron RAF between October 1941 and September 1942 with the Handley Page Halifax II
- No. 104 Squadron RAF between 7 and 12 November 1942 with the Wellington II
- No. 267 Squadron RAF between 19 January and 18 November 1943 with the Lockheed Hudson IV & Douglas Dakota
- No. 450 Squadron RAAF between 2 and 14 October 1942 with the Curtiss Kittyhawk III
- Detachment from No. 454 Squadron RAAF between April and September 1942

Kilo 26

- No. 6 Squadron RAF between 22 January and 28 April 1943 with the Hawker Hurricane I

Cairo West

- Detachment from No. 74 Squadron RAF between October and November 1943 with the Supermarine Spitfire VB, VC & IX
- Detachment from No. 89 Squadron RAF between December 1941 and January 1943 with Beaufighter IF
- No. 96 Squadron RAF between 30 March and 1 May 1945 with the Halifax III and Dakota
- No. 216 Squadron RAF between 27 November 1942 and 15 July 1945 with the Hudson VI & Dakota

Cold War

=== Six Day War ===
The Air Base was temporarily put out service was it was one of the air bases in Egypt attacked simultaneously by the Israeli Air Force during Operation Focus.

=== Late history ===
After submission of the Fiscal Year 1981 budget, the United States Secretary of Defense/JCS - ordered "Proud Phantom," at a request to Egypt which was an unprogrammed tactical deployment, not part of the regular exercise program. Twelve F-4E Phantom IIs and at least 400 personnel were dispatched from the 347th Tactical Fighter Wing at Moody Air Force Base, Georgia, to Cairo West, in July 1980.

On 29 May 1981 a Lockheed C-130 Hercules crashed after takeoff from the base.

For a long period it has been frequently listed by aviation periodicals as the home of the 222nd Tactical Fighter Brigade of the Egyptian Air Force, flying McDonnell Douglas F-4 Phantom IIs.

It has been a frequent site for United States Air Force deployments, with the 487th Air Expeditionary Wing located here in March-May 2003 during the 2003 invasion of Iraq.

The Cairo West TACAN (Ident: BLA) is located on the field.

== See also ==
- Transport in Egypt
- List of airports in Egypt
- List of North African airfields during World War II
