= Egyptian Air Force =

Aerial warfare branch of Egypt's armed forces

- القوات الجوية المصرية; Al Qūwāt Al Gawīyä Al Miṣrīya
- Emblem of the Egyptian Air Force
- Founded: Part of the Egyptian Army in 1932, an independent service arm in 1937 (94 years)
- Country: Egypt
- Type: Air force
- Role: Aerial warfare
- Size: 20,000 active personnel 5,000 reserve personnel 25,000 total personnel 757 aircraft
- Part of: Egyptian Armed Forces
- Headquarters: Heliopolis, Cairo
- Mottos: إلى العلا في سبيل المجد; I‘la’ al-'olà fī sabīl al-magd; "To highness for the sake of glory"
- Colours
- March: أغنية للقوات الجوية (Air Force Song)
- Mascot: Golden eagle
- Anniversaries: 14 October
- Engagements: See list: World War II 1948 Arab–Israeli War Suez Crisis North Yemen Civil War Six-Day War Nigerian Civil War War of Attrition Yom Kippur War Shaba I Egyptian–Libyan War Sinai insurgency Second Libyan Civil War 2015 airstrikes in Libya Intervention in Yemen Battle of Merowe Airport
- Website: www.mod.gov.eg

Commanders
- Supreme commander: President Abdel Fattah el-Sisi
- Minister of Defense: Lieutenant general Ashraf Salem Zaher
- Chief of Staff of the Armed Forces: Lieutenant general Ahmed Fathy Khalifa
- Commander of the Air Force: Lieutenant general Air Marshal Mahmoud Fouad Abdel-Gawad
- Chief of Air Staff: Major general Air Vice Marshal Amr Abdelrahman Sakkr
- Notable commanders: Hosni Mubarak; Ahmed Shafik; Reda Hafez

Insignia
- Roundel

- Fin flash

- Flag

Aircraft flown
- Attack: Alpha Jet, Wing Loong II, E-June 30SW
- Electronic warfare: E-2C, Beechcraft 1900, Commando Mk.2E
- Fighter: F-16A/B/C/D, Mirage 2000EM, Rafale DM/EM, MiG-29M/M2
- Helicopter: AW109, AW139, AW149, AW189, UH-60M, S-70, SA342L
- Attack helicopter: Ka-52E, AH-64D/E, Mi-24V, Mi-17, SA342L
- Cargo helicopter: CH-47D, Commando Mk.1/2B, Mi-8, Mi-17
- Patrol: SH-2G
- Reconnaissance: M-324, E-June 30SW, Mirage 5SDR, AT-802
- Trainer: K-8E, L-39, MiG-29UB, Mirage 2000BM, Mirage 5SDD, Alpha Jet, EMB 312, G-115
- Transport: C-130H, IL-76MF, C-295, An-74, DHC-5, Beechcraft 1900

The Egyptian Air Force (EAF) (Arabic: القوات الجوية المصرية, romanized: Al Qūwāt Al Gawīyä Al Miṣrīya) is the aviation branch of the Egyptian Armed Forces that is responsible for all airborne defence missions and operates all military aircraft, including those used in support of the Egyptian Army, Egyptian Navy, and the Egyptian Air Defense Forces. The latter was created as a separate command in the 1970s, and it coordinates with the Air Force to integrate air and ground-based air defense operations. The EAF is headed by an air marshal (lieutenant general equivalent). The force's motto is 'To highness for the sake of glory' (Arabic: إلى العلا في سبيل المجد, I‘la’ al-'olà fī sabīl al-magd).

It was known as the Royal Egyptian Air Force until 18 June 1953, following the declaration of the Republic of Egypt by Mohamed Naguib. The Egyptian Army Air Service was formed in 1932 and became an independent air force in 1937. It had little involvement in the World War II. From 1948 to 1973, it took part in four separate lost wars with Israel, as well as the quasi-War of Attrition. It also supported the Egyptian Army during the North Yemen Civil War and the Libyan–Egyptian War of 1977. From 1977 to 2011 it saw virtually no combat, but has participated in numerous exercises, including Operation Bright Star. Since 1992 the EAF has also provided aviation support for the police and other national security organizations engaged in the war against terrorism. In recent years, the Air Force has acted in the Sinai insurgency, the Second Libyan Civil War, and the Intervention in the Yemen.

The EAF primary role is the air defence of the nation, with secondary tasks of strike and army support operations. The EAF provides official government transport and carries out international search-and- rescue operations in the desert, the Mediterranean Sea, and the Red Sea.

In 2023, the IISS estimated the total active manpower of the Egyptian Air Force at approximately 30,000 personnel, including 10,000 conscripts, with reserves of 20,000 personnel.

== History ==
=== Establishment (Egyptian Army Air Force) ===
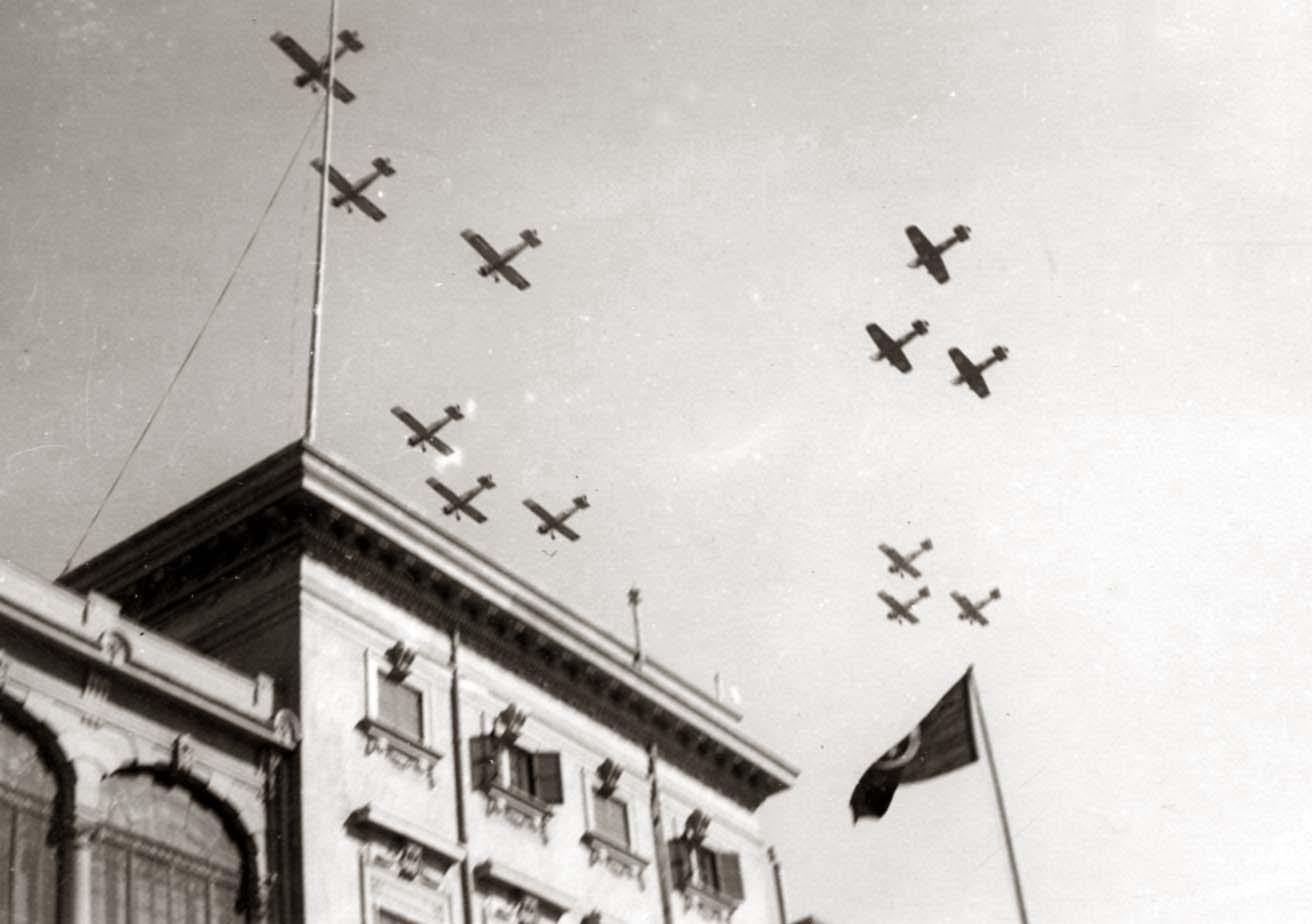
Egyptian airplanes flying over Koubbeh Palace in celebration of King Farouk I and Queen Farida's wedding.

In late 1928, the Parliament of Egypt proposed the creation of an Egyptian Air Force. The Egyptian ministry of war announced that it needed volunteers for the new arm to become the first four Egyptian military pilots. Over 200 Egyptian officers volunteered, but in the end only three succeeded in passing strict medical tests and technical examinations.

These three went to No. 4 Flying Training School RAF at RAF Station Abu Sueir near the Suez Canal, where they were trained on a variety of aircraft. After graduation, they traveled to the United Kingdom for specialised training.

Royal Egyptian Air Force

roundel (1945–1958)

Flag (1930–1958)

On 2 November 1930, the King of Egypt and Sudan, Fuad I announced the creation of the Egyptian Army Air Force (EAAF). On 27 May 1931, the Egyptian Council of Ministers approved the purchase of five aircraft and the building of an airfield at Almaza (Cairo) with a budget of 50,000 pounds. The aircraft chosen was the British de Havilland Gipsy Moth trainer, the five modified aircraft were flown from England to Egypt and on arrival in May 1932 the air force was founded and the Almaza airfield was formally opened.

The first commander of the EAAF was Squadron Leader Victor Hubert Tait RAF, a Canadian, former Senior Air Advisor on the British Military Mission in Egypt. Tait selected staff, weapons and initiated building a number of airfields. In 1934 the British government provided ten Avro 626 aircraft, which were the first real Egyptian military planes. A further 17 626s together with Hawker Audaxes for army cooperation and close support and Avro Ansons for VIP work followed shortly afterward.

In 1937 the Egyptian Army Air Force was separated from the Army Command and became an independent branch named the Royal Egyptian Air Force (REAF). New stations were built in the Suez Canal Zone, and the Western Desert.

During 1938 the REAF received two squadrons (Nos 2 and 5) of Gloster Gladiator biplane fighters and No. 1 Squadron of Westland Lysander reconnaissance aircraft, Egypt was the last state to use the Lysander in action, during the 1948 Arab–Israeli War.

=== Second World War ===
As the Egyptian border was threatened by an Italian and German invasion during the Second World War, the Royal Air Force established more airfields in Egypt. The Royal Egyptian Air Force was sometimes treated as a part of the Royal Air Force, at other times a strict policy of neutrality was followed as Egypt maintained its official neutrality until very late in the war. As a result, few additional aircraft were supplied by Britain, however the arm did receive its first modern fighters, Hawker Hurricanes and a small number of Curtiss P-40 Tomahawks. In the immediate post-war period, cheap war surplus aircraft, including a large number of Supermarine Spitfire Mk.IXs were acquired.

A 1946 order of battle for the Air Force can be found in Jane's Fighting Aircraft of World War II, listing Nos 1, 3, 4, 5, and 6 Squadrons at Almaza Air Base, and No. 2 Squadron at Edku.

=== 1948 Arab–Israeli War ===
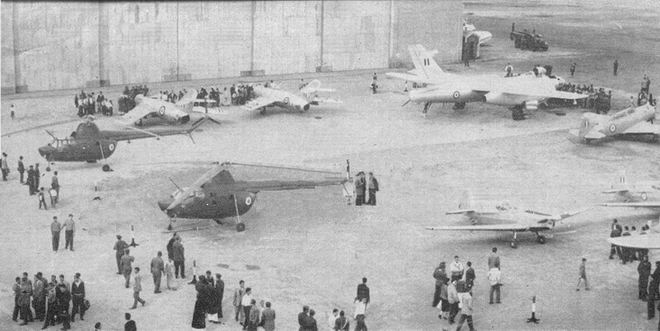
On display circa 1956, new aircraft purchased from Czechoslovakia and the USSR clockwise: MiG-17F, MiG-15bis, Il-28, Yak-11, Zlin 226, and two Mi-1 helicopters.

Following the British withdrawal from the British Protectorate of Mandatory Palestine and the establishment of the State of Israel on 14 May 1948, Egyptian forces crossed into Israel as part of a wider Arab League military coalition attempting to defeat the Israelis. The Egyptian Air Force contribution included the Short Stirling bomber, Douglas C-47 Dakotas performing as light bombers and Spitfires.

On 22 May 1948, Egyptian Spitfires attacked the RAF Ramat David airfield, believing that it had already been taken over by Israeli forces. The first raid surprised the British, and resulted in the destruction of several RAF aircraft on the ground, and the deaths of four airmen. The British were uncertain whether the attacking Spitfires had come from Arab or Israeli forces. When second and third raids followed shortly afterwards, the British were ready and the entire Egyptian force was shot down – the last aircraft being baited for some time as the RAF pilots attempted to get a close look at its markings.

Relations with Britain were soon restored and the official state of war with Israel ensured that arms purchases continued. New Spitfire Mk. 22s were purchased to replace the earlier models. In late 1949, Egypt received its first jet fighter, the British Gloster Meteor F4 and shortly after de Havilland Vampire FB5s.

=== Republican Egypt (Egyptian Air Force) ===
In 1955, Egypt made an agreement to buy heavy arms from Czechoslovakia, culminating four years of attempts. The Egyptian Government was determined to move away from reliance on British armaments. 1951 discussions had included 60–100 Mikoyan-Gurevich MiG-15 fighters. Initial Soviet bloc deliveries included the MiG-15s, Ilyushin Il-28 bombers, Ilyushin Il-14 transports, and Yak-11 trainers. Instructors from Czechoslovakia accompanied these aircraft. Egypt also began manufacturing its own Czechoslovak-designed Heliopolis Gomhouria (originally the German Bü 181 Bestmann) primary trainers at this time.

=== Suez Crisis ===
After the Egyptian Government's nationalization of the Suez Canal in 1956, Egypt was attacked by Israel, France, and the United Kingdom in what came to be known as the Suez Crisis ("Tripartite Aggression" in Egypt). Heavy losses were sustained by the Egyptian side. After U.S. pressure, the French and British withdrew their forces after seizing the city of Suez. The war also forced the EAF to rebuild without British help.

In 1958, Egypt merged with Syria to form the United Arab Republic, and the previously separate Egyptian and Syrian forces were combined as the United Arab Republic Air Force. Though Syria left the union in 1961, Egypt continued to use the union's official name until 1971, including for its air force.

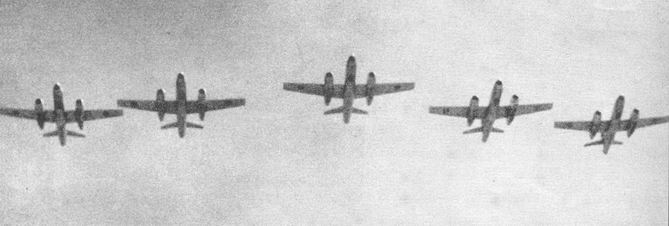
A formation of Il-28 bombers, over Cairo during a parade in September 1956.

One of the first Egyptian Mikoyan-Gurevich MiG-19 units was the 15th Air Brigade, consisting of Nos 20 and 21 Squadrons, which became operational at Fayid with a forward location at Milayz in the early 1960s.

By the mid-1960s, British aircraft had been replaced completely by Soviet hardware. The Soviet Union became the principal supplier of the EAF, and many other Arab states. This allowed the EAF to greatly modernise and boost its combat effectiveness. The MiG-21 Fishbed arrived in the early 1960s, bringing with it a Mach 2 capability. The MiG-21 would remain Egypt's primary fighter for the next two decades. The EAF also began flying the Sukhoi Su-7 fighter/bomber in the mid-1960s. By 1966, Air Group 65, with its primary base at Cairo West Air Base, was operating three squadrons of Tupolev Tu-16 "Badgers": No. 34 and 36 Squadrons with bomber variants, and No. 95 Squadron equipped with the Tu-16KS' that could carry AS-1 Kennel air-to-surface missiles. In 1967, Egypt had 200 MiG-21s.

Egypt also took over the Helwan HA-300 from Spain as its first supersonic aircraft. It never went beyond three prototypes and initial test flights. It was abandoned due to high costs and political factors. The German designers involved had to leave Egypt after death threats from the Israeli intelligence agency Mossad, in Operation Damocles.

=== Yemen War ===
The Yemeni Royalist side received support from Saudi Arabia and Jordan, while the Yemeni Republicans were supported by Egypt. The fighting was fierce, featuring heavy urban combat as well as battles in the countryside. Both foreign irregular and conventional forces were also involved.

Strategically, the Yemen War was an opportunity for Israel. It stagnated Egyptian military plans for the reinforcement of Sinai, by shifting the Egyptian military focus to another theater of operation. Egyptian historian Mohammed Heikal writes that Israel provided arms shipments and also cultivated relationships with hundreds of European mercenaries fighting for the Royalists in Yemen. Israel established a covert air-supply bridge from Djibouti to North Yemen. The war also gave the Israelis the opportunity to assess Egyptian combat tactics and adaptability.

Egyptian air and naval forces began bombing and shelling raids in the Saudi southwestern city of Najran and the coastal town of Jizan, which were staging points for royalist forces. In response, the Saudis purchased British Thunderbird surface-to-air missiles and developed their King Khalid airfield near Khamis Mushait. Riyadh also attempted to convince the United States to respond on its behalf. In Operation Hard Surface, President Kennedy sent jet fighters and bombers to Dhahran Air Base from May 1963, demonstrating to Egypt the seriousness of his commitment to defending U.S. interests in Saudi Arabia.

=== Six-Day War ===
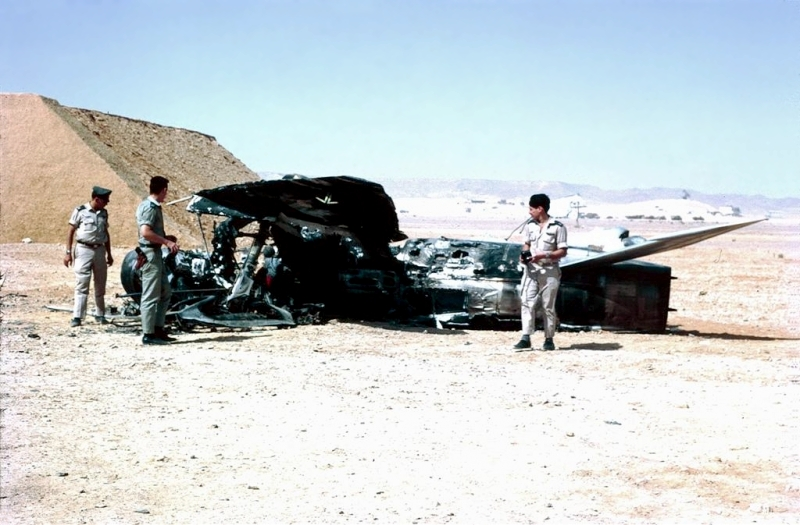
Israeli troops examine a destroyed Egyptian Mig 21

In the 1967 Six-Day War, the EAF's combat capacity was severely damaged after the Israeli Air Force destroyed its air bases in a preemptive strike codenamed Operation Focus. During the last four days, the EAF conducted only 150 sorties against Israeli units throughout the Sinai. After the war, the Soviet Union replenished EAF stocks, sending large numbers of aircraft and advisors to Egypt to revitalise the EAF.

The EAF's first air-to-air victory is claimed by MiG-21 pilot Nabil Shoukry against a Mirage IIICJ fighter over Inchas air base two hours following the first Israeli strike.

On 8 June 1967, a pair of Egyptian MiG-21s engaged a pair of Mirage IIIs over the Sinai. In the ensuing dogfight, the EAF's 1st Lt Fakhry El-Ashmawy managed to down one of the Mirage fighters while the second Mirage crashed from fuel exhaustion.

Initial Egyptian claims were even more inflated, but were later reduced to 72 Israeli aircraft destroyed. The IDF/AF admitted 45 losses on all fronts, while outside observers put the figure between 55 and 60. Years later, unofficial Israeli sources admitted ten IDF/AF aircraft downed in air combat on all fronts. Independent sources put this figure at 11, plus another resulting in fuel exhaustion. In fact, several Israeli aircraft reportedly downed by ground fire probably fell to Egyptian fighters.

=== Nigerian Civil War ===
During the Nigerian Civil War, Nigeria received air support from pilots of the Egyptian Air Force, who launched air raids against the self-declared republic of Biafra. The Egyptian pilots flew aircraft procured by the Soviet Union, air force Mikoyan MiG-17 fighters and Ilyushin Il-28 bombers.

=== War of Attrition ===
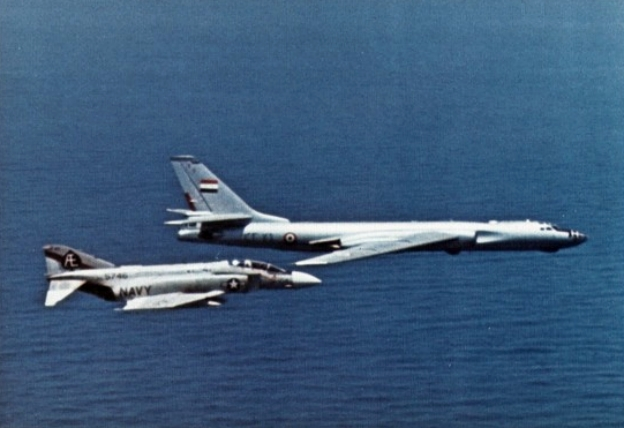
An F-4 Phantom from VF-102 intercepting an Egyptian Air Force Tupolev Tu-16 Badger over the Mediterranean Sea, 1972

The years between 1967 and 1970 involved a prolonged campaign of attrition against Israel. The EAF went through a massive construction program to build new air bases in order to increase its survivability. During this period, Egypt also received replacements for losses it suffered during the Six-Day War. The EAF was the first branch of the Egyptian armed forces to achieve full combat readiness.

On 15 July 1967, six Israeli Mirage III fighters violated Egyptian airspace and orders were given for two formations each consisted of two MiG-21 fighters to intercept, another formation of 2 MiGs piloted by Major Fawzy Salama & Lieutenant Medhat Zaki was ready in West Cairo airbase. Indeed, the formation took off, but for protecting the airbase rather than supporting the interception.

=== Yom Kippur War ===
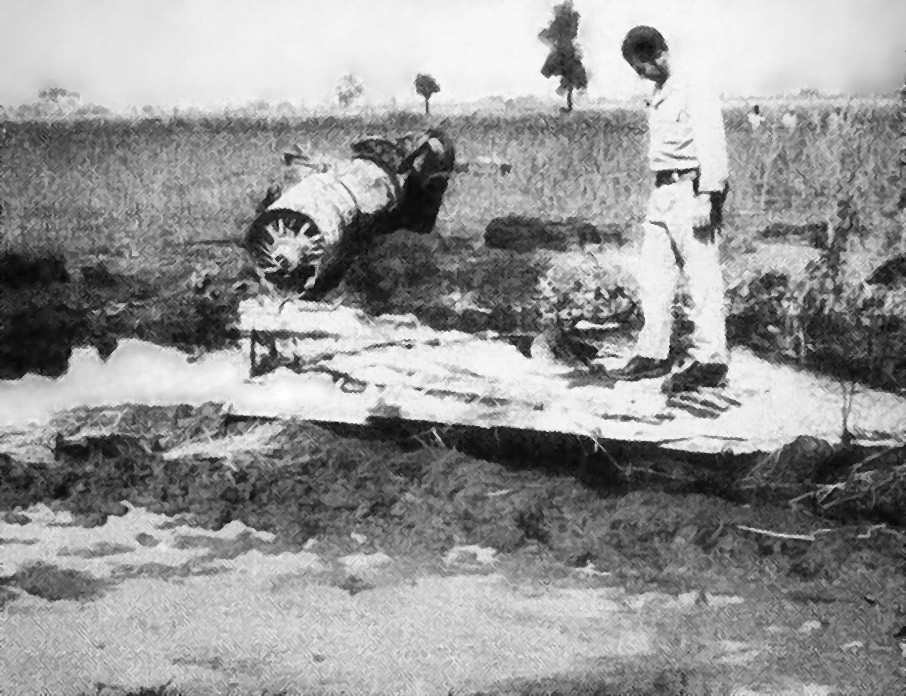
An Israeli Mirage, shot down over the west bank of the canal during the battle of Ismailia

During the initial surprise air attack of the Yom Kippur War, over 220 EAF aircraft took part. Unlike their Syrian counterparts, EAF aircraft evaded Israeli radars by flying below detection height. EAF aircraft were held in reserve after that point, mainly concentrating on airfield defence in conjunction with the SA-3 'Goa', while the more mobile SA-6 'Gainful' protected Egyptian forces at low and medium level, aided by the ZSU-23-4 and shoulder-held SA-7 SAMs.

Despite these limitations, the EAF conducted offensive sorties from time to time. The Su-7BM was used for quick strafe attacks on Israeli columns and the Mirage IIIE (sometimes confused with the Mirage 5), donated by Libya, carried out long-range attacks deep inside Sinai at Bir Gifgafa.

However, when Israeli armoured forces used a gap between the two Egyptian armies to cross the Suez Canal (Operation Stouthearted Men), they destroyed several Egyptian SAM sites, forcing the EAF into battle against the IAF. The EAF claimed victories and continued to contest IAF operations, while also launching attacks on Israeli ground forces on the East Bank of the Suez Canal. In most of these engagements, Egyptian MiG-21s (of all types) challenged Israeli Mirage IIICJs or Neshers.

The IAF did not operate freely and did not have complete air supremacy it enjoyed during the previous conflict, the 1967 war. Egyptian MiGs were used with better efficiency than before which included the tactics and lessons learned from the 1967 war.

It was during this war that the EAF applied the lessons it earlier learnt from the Israelis. A 32-year-old deputy MiG-21 regiment commander who has been flying since he was 15 recalls: "During the war of attrition, the Israeli air force had a favorite ambush tactic", he told Aviation Week and Space Technology. "They would penetrate with two aircraft at medium altitude where they would be quickly picked up by radar, We would scramble four or eight to attack them. But they had another dozen fighters trailing at extremely low altitude below radar coverage. As we climbed to the attack they would zoom up behind and surprise us. My regiment lost MiGs to this ambush tactic three times. But we learned the lesson and practiced the same tactics. In the final fights over Deversoir, we ambushed some Mirages the same way, and my own 'finger four' formation shot down four Mirages with the loss of one MiG."

The Egyptian Air Force commander during the war was then-Air Marshal Hosni Mubarak. On 14 October 1973 one of many Egyptian/Israeli air engagements took place. Initial Egyptian reports that 15 Israeli aircraft had been destroyed. on the day of "Air battle of Mansoura". Later on, the Egyptian government changed the country's "Air Force Day" from 2 November to 14 October, to commemorate the Mansourah air battle. Mubarak was even promoted and feted as a national hero after the war, It was estimated that over 2200 take offs were done by the Egyptian Air Force throughout the war that included dogfighting and ground attacks.

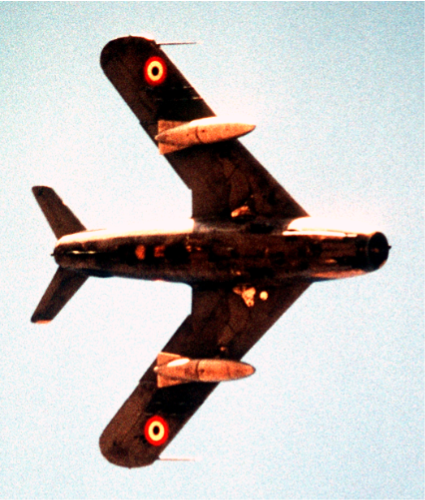
EAF MiG17

=== Shaba I ===
During the Shaba I crisis in Zaire on 1977, Egyptian Air Force provided 50 pilots and technicians, who operated Mirage jets for the Zairian Air Force.

=== Libyan–Egyptian War ===
During the 1977 Libyan–Egyptian War, there were some skirmishes between Libyan and Egyptian fighters. In one instance, two Libyan Air Force MiG-23MS engaged two EAF MiG-21MFs that had been upgraded to carry Western weaponry. The Libyan pilots made the mistake of trying to manoeuvre with the more nimble Egyptian fighters, and one MiG-23MS was shot down by EAF Maj. Sal Mohammad, while the other Libyan aircraft used its speed advantage to escape.

=== Camp David Accords and Egypt-Israel Peace Treaty ===
Egyptian president Anwar Sadat and Israeli Prime Minister Menachem Begin signed the Camp David Accords, Egypt would receive US$1.3 Billion military aid while Israel would receive US$3.1 Billion in aid. Ever since Egypt signed its peace treaty with Israel, Egypt shifted to American weaponry and drifted away from the Soviet style weapons. In March 1982, Egypt received its first 12 F-16 fighter Jets for its inventory.

From 1980, the EAF was involved in the joint U.S.-Egyptian biannual Exercise Bright Star.

=== Sinai Insurgency ===
The Egyptian Air Force operated on a large scale during the Sinai insurgency which commenced in 2011. AH-64 Apache helicopters and F-16 jet fighters bombed numerous militant targets on almost a daily basis.

=== Second Libyan Civil War ===
During the Second Libyan Civil War, there were conflicting reports that Egyptian warplanes bombed Islamist militias in support of the government based in Tobruk. The foreign ministry denied any involvement in the conflict although unnamed Egyptian military officials claimed otherwise. Egypt tightened security on Libyan border following mysterious air strikes. Egyptian forces near the Libyan border have been put on high alert following airstrikes on Jan 10 from unidentified fighter jets inside Libya. The fighter jets struck Islamic State of Iraq and Levant (ISIL) targets inside Libya, according to news reports. The Libyan coastal city of Sirte has served as ISIL's capital in North Africa since the terror group seized the city last summer.

After receiving three MiG-21MFs and three Mi-8s from Egypt just half a year ago, it appears the Libyan Air Force is now further strengthened by two MiG-21MFs from the same source. The former EAF mounts are a welcome addition to the under-equipped Libyan Air Force, which is currently waging a war against Libya Dawn, Ansar al-Sharia and even the Islamic State, the latter centered around the Libyan city of Derna.

On 6 March 2016, Egypt and France began on Sunday a joint military exercise termed as the "Ramses-2016" in the coastal city of Alexandria along the Mediterranean. The French nuclear-powered aircraft carrier Charles de Gaulle is steaming through the Red Sea on its way to the Mediterranean via the Suez Canal for joint maneuvers with the Egyptian air force and navy in preparation for a reduced coalition offensive against Islamic State's deepening grip on Libya.

=== 2015 Airstrikes in Libya ===
The February 2015, Egyptian airstrikes in Libya against Islamic State of Iraq and the Levant (ISIL) positions in Libya took place on 16 February 2015, and were triggered by a video released by ISIL in Libya a day earlier, depicting the beheading of 21 Coptic Christians from Egypt.

Within hours, the Egyptian Air Force responded with airstrikes against ISIL training camps and weapons stockpiles in retaliation for the killings. Warplanes acting under orders from the Libyan government also struck targets in Derna, reportedly in coordination with Egypt. It is believed that more than eight EAF F-16 jet fighters were used for the strikes, including the newly joined "block 52" variants.

The airstrikes had allegedly killed up to 81 ISIL militants, including three of the leadership, in the coastal cities of Derna and Sirte. Libyan media reported that at least 35 more Egyptians had been rounded up by ISIL in retaliation for the air raids.

=== 2015 Military Intervention in Yemen ===
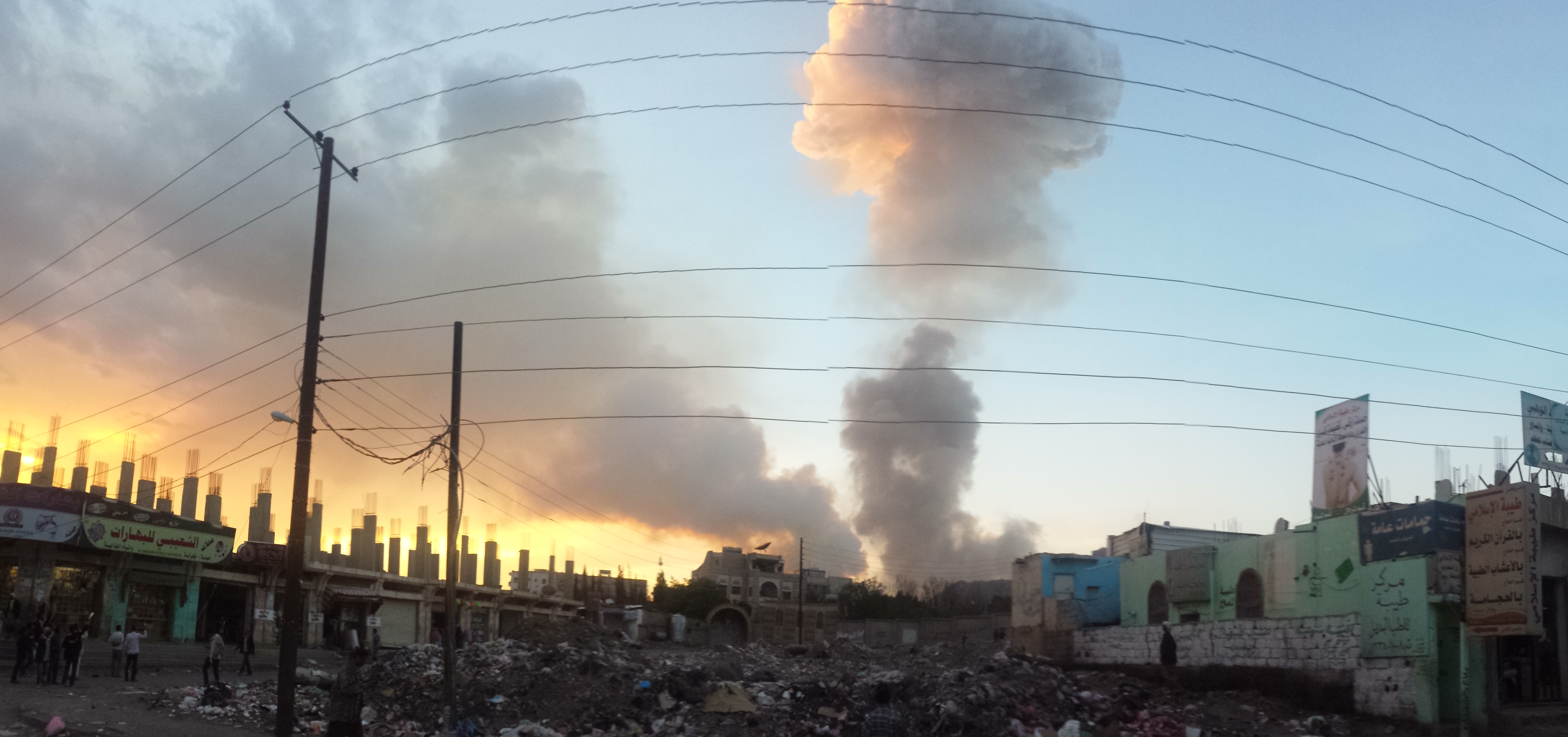
An airstrike in Sana'a on 11 May 2015

Egyptian Air Forces are participating in a Saudi-led joint regional military operation to halt the advance of Houthi rebels in Yemen, Egypt's presidency announced on 2015 March 25 in a statement. the Egyptian Air Force participated in airstrikes against Houthis in Yemen.

Egypt's military participation "through elements of the Egyptian air and navy forces" aims to support the Saudi-led regional coalition to restore stability in Yemen "under legitimate leadership", according to the Egyptian presidency's statement.

The Egyptian air force supported pro-government forces when they attacked Al Anad Air Base in the south of Yemen. "EAF and paratroopers aerial supported Yemeni ground forces who have now seized the military base killing scores of Houthi rebels".

=== 2017 Airstrikes in Libya ===
On May 26, 2017, armed men traveling in pickup trucks gunned down 28 Coptic Christians and wounded 26 as the Christians were on their way to visit a monastery in Egypt's Minya province, The Islamic State claimed responsibility for this attack. That same evening, Egypt announced that its air force had carried out six air raids on ISIS camps near the Libyan city of Derna. The strikes involved F-16C/D Block 52s covered by at least two Dassault Rafales.

== Structure ==
Air bases of the Egyptian Air Force: Egyptian Air Force bases

=== Air bases ===
- Abu Sultan Air Base
- Abu Suweir Air Base
- Al Khatatbah Air Base
- Al Mansurah Air Base
- Almaza Air Base
- Aswan Air Base at Aswan International Airport
- Az Zaqaziq Air Base
- Beni Suef Air Base
- Bilbays Air Base
- Bir Gifgafa Airfield
- Borg-el-Arab/Intl Air Base at Borg El Arab International Airport
- Cairo/Intl Air Base at Cairo International Airport
- Cairo West Air Base
- Dakhla Air Base
- Daraw Air Base
- El Alamein Air Base at El Alamein International Airport
- El Arish Air Base at El Arish International Airport
- El Minya Air Base
- Fayid Air Base
- Gebel el Basur Air Base (Berigat)
- Habata Air Base
- Hurghada Air Base at Hurghada International Airport
- Ismailia Air Base
- Jiyanklis Air Base
- Kibrit Air Base
- Kom Awshim Air Base
- Mersha Matruh Air Base at Marsa Matruh International Airport
- Quwaysina Air Base
- Ras Banas Air Base within Ras Banas
- Uthman Air Base
- Wadi Abu Rish Air Base
- Wadi al Jandali Air Base

== Aircraft ==
The Camp David Accords caused a gradual change in the overall composition of the EAF. The EAF began to rely more on US, French and in some cases on Chinese aircraft.

The addition of these aircraft from multiple sources along with the ones already in the EAF inventory caused increasing serviceability problems. In 1982, the EAF began receiving General Dynamics F-16 Fighting Falcon fighters under the Peace Vector Program. Turkish Aerospace / TUSAS produced 46 F-16s for the Egyptian Air Force between 1993 and 1995 under the agreement signed between the Governments of Turkey and the Arab Republic of Egypt. As of 2015, the EAF received a total of 220 F-16s. 18 aircraft were lost in accidents and 7 F-16A/Bs were grounded.

These grounded F-16A/Bs were later overhauled, upgraded and returned to active service, additional F-16s were acquired to replace those lost. In 1986, the EAF received the French Mirage 2000 fighters, one was lost in a training accident. Egypt also license-built Alphajets, Tucano airplanes and Westland Gazelle helicopters.

In 1987 the E-2C Hawkeye Airborne Early Warning (AEW) entered service and was upgraded with advanced AN/APS-145 radars. The EAF also upgraded its F-16 fighters to C/D standard that enabled them to fire the AGM-84 Harpoon anti-ship missile.

The EAF currently operates 46 AH-64 Apache attack helicopters 36 of which were initially delivered as the AH-64A variant but were later upgraded to AH-64D standard. On 22 May 2009, Egypt requested the purchase of 36 Apache Arrowhead sensor systems as part of an order for 12 Block II AH-64D Apache helicopters. The number was later reduced to 10 Helicopters. 74 Grob G-115's and 120 K-8 Karakorum trainers were also ordered.

=== Modernization ===
Egypt made several deals with Ukrainian companies for the modernization of its old MiG-21 fleet but these deals were not implemented, and all old MiG-21 fighters were taken out of service.

On 3 March 2010, the EAF ordered 20 Lockheed Martin F-16C/D Block 52 aircraft. The contract was set to complete in 2013 and included 16 single-seat F-16C and four twin-seat F-16D aircraft. On 14 August 2012, the US Defense Department awarded a major contract to facilitate the procurement of F-16s by the EAF. The Pentagon selected American International Contractors for a $66.6 million contract to upgrade infrastructure for Egypt's order of 20 F-16 Block 52 aircraft, estimated at $2.2 billion. On 24 July 2013, the U.S. announced it would halt deliveries of the F-16s in response to the 2013 Egyptian coup d'état. In March 2015 the US announced the resumption of the deliveries of the F-16s, the last of which was delivered in October 2015.

On 16 February 2015, Egypt became the Dassault Rafale's first international customer when it officially ordered 24 Rafales, as part of a larger deal (including a FREMM multipurpose frigate and a supply of missiles) worth US$5.9 billion (€5.2 billion). In July 2015, the official ceremony, marking the acceptance by Egypt of its first 3 Rafales, was held at the Dassault Aviation flight test center in Istres. In January 2016, Egypt received three more Rafale fighters, raising the number of Rafales in service to six. All six aircraft are two-seat models and were diverted from delivery to the French Air Force; Egypt's total 24-plane order is for 8 single-seat models and 16 two-seaters.

In April 2014, it was reported that Egypt planned to order 24 MiG-35 fighters as part of an arms deal with Russia. MiG head Sergei Korotkov said at the 2015 Aero India exposition they will provide the fighters if Egypt orders them and are ready to negotiate. Russia agreed on a contract with Egypt for 46 MiG-29M/M2 fighters and it was expected to be worth up to US$2 billion. Russia planned to supply the Egyptian MiG-29M/M2s with 40 high precision targeting pods. Deliveries would have begun in 2016.

SAGEM and AOI-Aircraft Factory signed a collaboration agreement concerning the Patroller UAV. AOI-Aircraft Factory could handle final assembly of the drones and developed a dedicated training center in Egypt to train staff for the operation and maintenance of the drone systems.

On 18 April 2016, Egypt signed a contract with France for the sale of a military telecommunications satellite after discussions between the Egyptian and French presidents and between the Ministers of Defense, which took place during a visit by French President Francois Hollande to Cairo. The satellite were supplied by Airbus Defence and Space and Thales Alenia Space. The price of the contract was not announced but was estimated at 600 million euros.

In September 2016, Russian Helicopters delivered the first 3 refurbished Mi-8T helicopters to the Egyptian Air Force after a major overhaul. The company also announced that the necessary equipment for the retooling and upgrading of the Helwan Factory aircraft repair plant had been prepared for shipment and that the Egyptian service technicians had completed training.

In August 2019, the Royal Jordanian Air Force transferred two of its Ilyushin Il-76MF aircraft to the Egyptian Air Force. The two aircraft are unique because they are the only stretched version of the famous Il-76 air-frame.

On 4 May 2021, France agreed to sell Egypt an additional 30 Dassault Rafale warplanes in a 4 billion euro (US$4.8 billion) deal.

On 15 March 2022, the United States agreed to sell Egypt variants of F-15Es, the offer's amount of planes and price is to be determined.

In July 2025, Turkey announced Egypt's participation in the Kaan program, including co-production of the aircraft. This agreement reflects a strategic shift and a focus on practical industrial collaboration between the two nations.

On November 28, 2025, the Egyptian Air Force received a new batch of the Rafale F4.2 for a total of expected 54 total, all 54 are being upgraded to the F3R and F4.2 standard The Egyptian presidency also confirmed for the first time the acquisition of the METEOR BVR missile for its Rafales

=== Current inventory ===
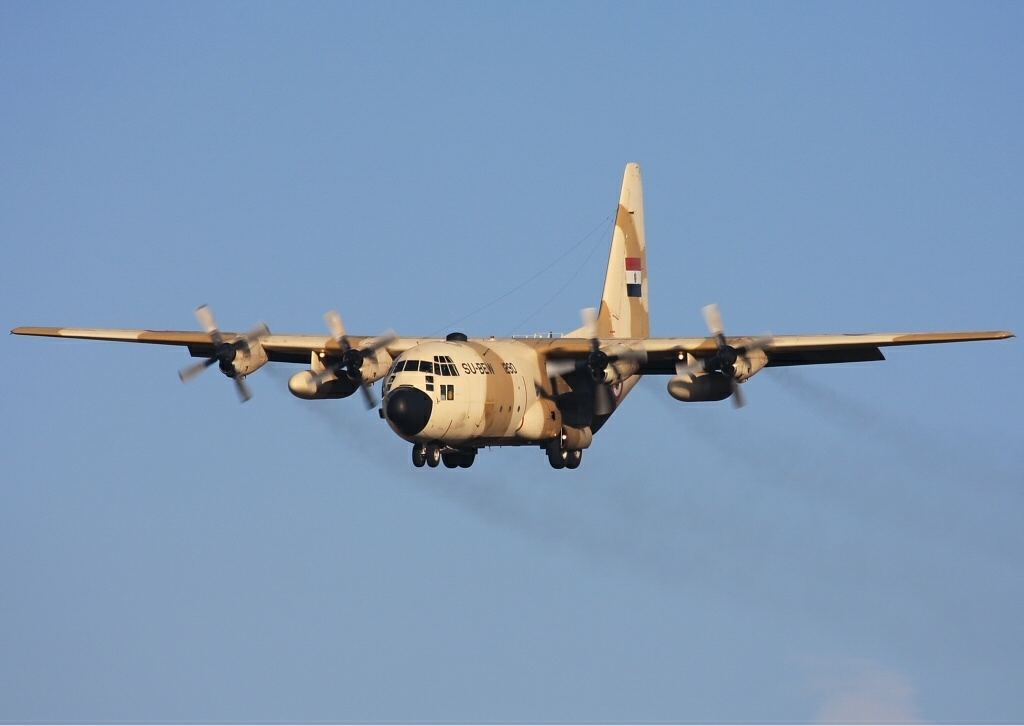
An Egyptian C-130H aircraft

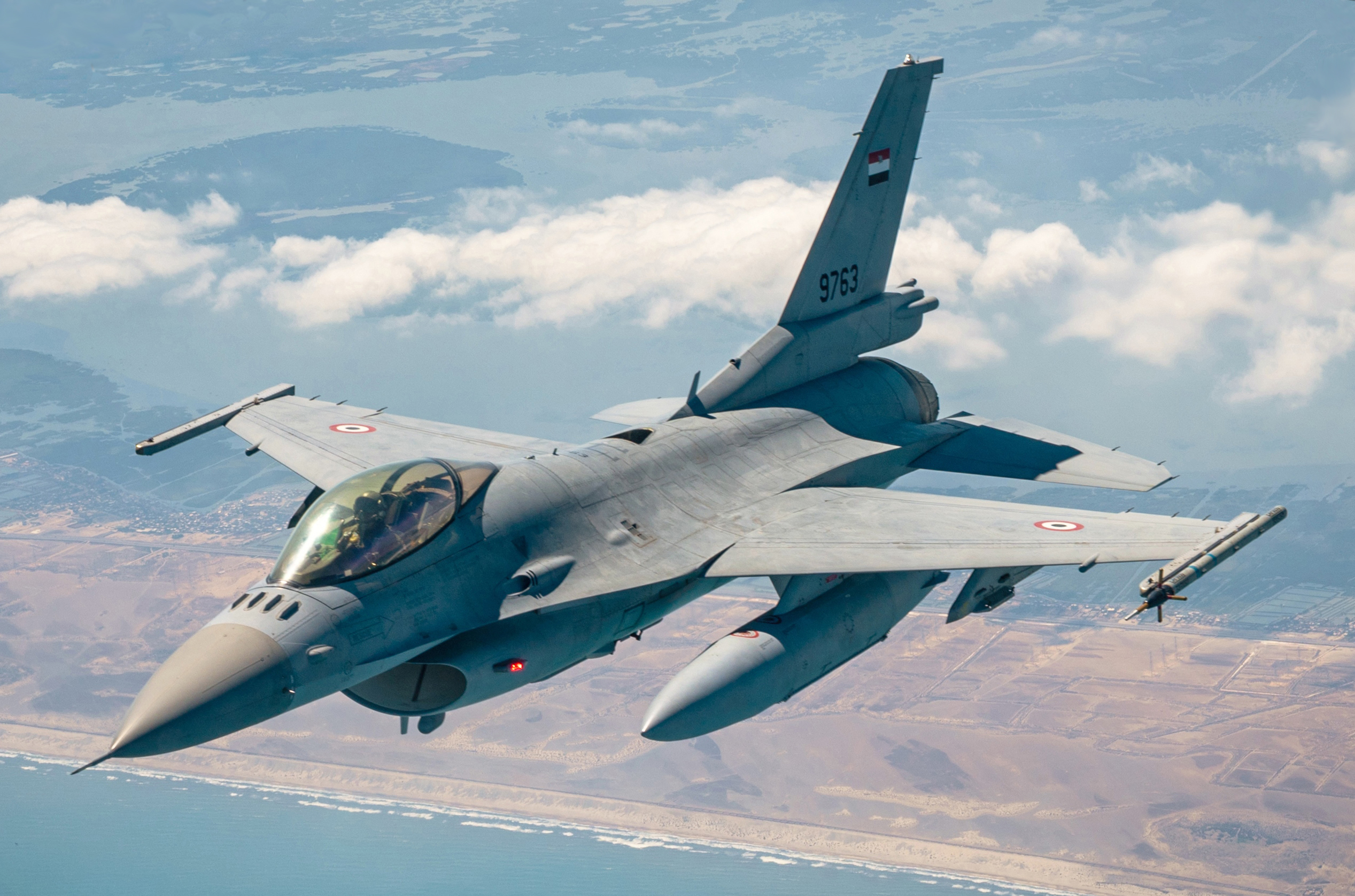
An Egyptian F-16 Fighting Falcon

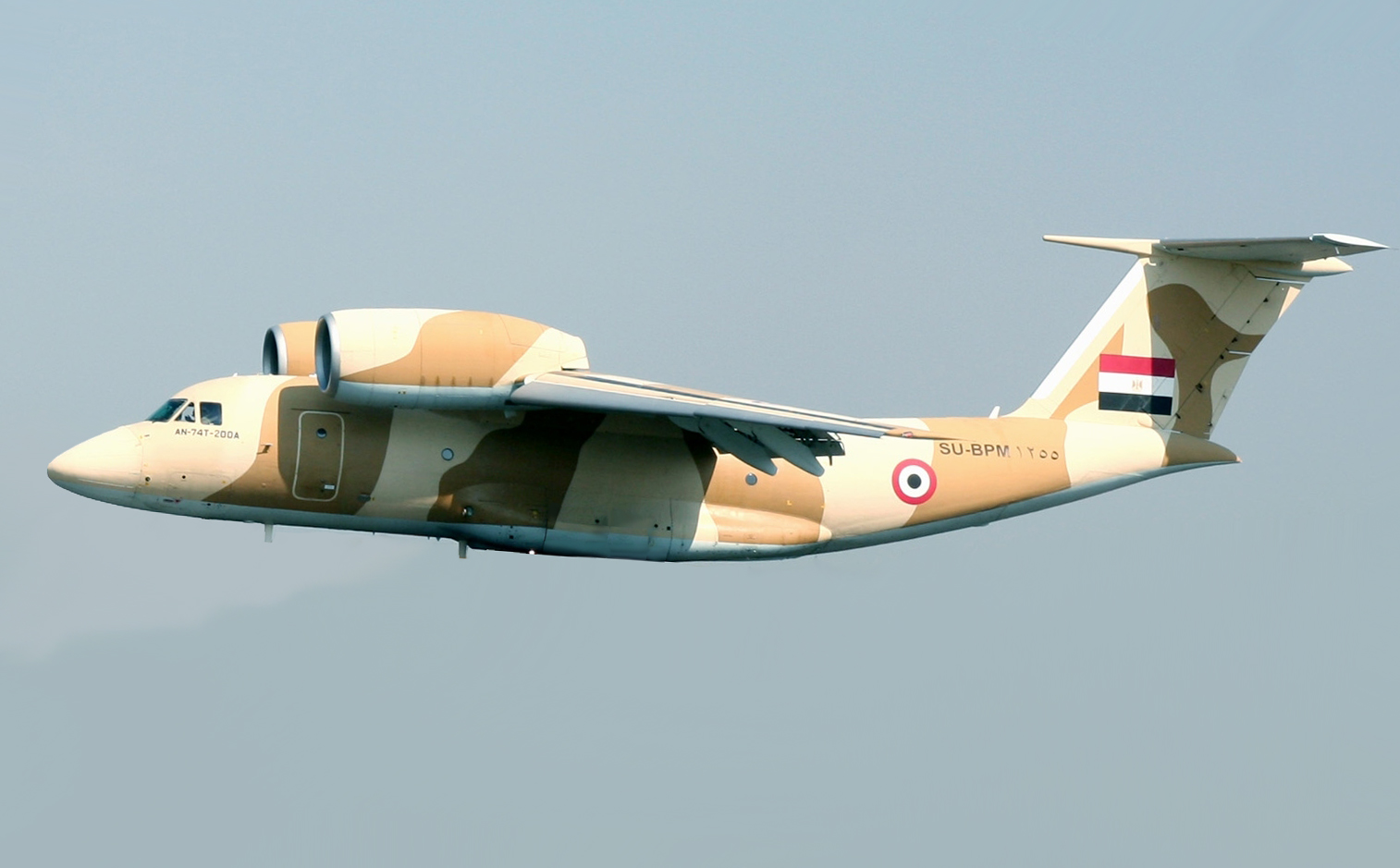
An Egyptian An-74 in flight

Aircraft	Origin	Type	Variant	In service	Notes
Fighter jets (329)
Dassault Rafale	France	multirole	DM/EM F4.2 Variant	46	8 more to be delivered by end of 2026
F-16 Fighting Falcon	United States	multirole	C/D Block 40/52	220	All variants upgraded to Block 40/52
MiG-29M	Russia	multirole	M/M2	45	
Mirage 2000	France	multirole		18	
AEW&C (9)
E-2 Hawkeye	United States	AEW&C	E-2C	7	
Saab GlobalEye	Sweden	AEW&C	Global 6500	2	On July 27th 2026, Saab announced that an order worth €910 million for 2 Saab GlobalEye aircraft The deliveries are expected in 2030.
Aerial Refueling (4)
McDonnell Douglas KC-10 Extender	United States	Tanker	KC-10A	4	the U.S. government has approved the sale to Egypt of four retired KC-10A Extender heavy tanker-transport aircraft previously operated by the U.S. Air Force.
Transport (55)
Antonov An-74	Ukraine	transport	An-74TK-200A	3	
Beechcraft 1900	United States	transport		4	
CASA C-295	Spain	transport		24	
C-130 Hercules	United States	transport / SAR / ELINT	C-130H	20	2 used for ELINT.
C-130J Super Hercules	United States	transport	C-130J-30	2	10 more on order
Ilyushin Il-76	Russia	heavy transport	Il-76MF	2	obtained from Royal Jordanian Air Force
Helicopters (285)
Aérospatiale Gazelle	France	scout / anti-armor	SA342K	45	
Aérospatiale Gazelle	France	scout / anti-armor	SA342L	3	
AgustaWestland AW109	Italy	light utility / VIP transport		3	
AgustaWestland AW139	Italy	light utility / VIP / SAR		4	2 used for SAR.
AgustaWestland AW149	Italy	utility / VIP transport		5	
AgustaWestland AW189	Italy	utility / SAR		8	8 on order
AH-64 Apache	United States	Attack	AH-64E	45	10 More AH-64E's on order, to be delivered by 2031 All AH-64D variants have been upgraded to the E variant
CH-47 Chinook	United States	transport / CSAR	CH-47D	15	
CH-47 Chinook	United States	transport / CSAR	CH-47C	3	
CH-47 Chinook	United States	Transport/CSAR	CH-47F	5	7 more to be delivered by December 2026.
Kamov Ka-52	Russia	scout / anti-armor	Ka-52	46	
Mil Mi-8	Soviet Union	utility	Mi-8T	40	
Mil Mi-17	Soviet Union	utility	Mi-17-1V	3	
Mil Mi-24	Soviet Union	Attack	Mi-24V	13	
SH-2G Super Seasprite	United States	ASW / maritime patrol		7	
UH-60 Black Hawk	United States	VIP transport	UH-60L	4	
Westland Sea King	United Kingdom	transport / utility	Commando Mk.2/1	22	
Trainer aircraft (194)
Alpha Jet	France / Germany	advanced trainer		53	
Aero L-39	Czech Republic	primary trainer		11	
Embraer EMB-312	Brazil	trainer		14	
Grob G 115	Germany	basic trainer		74	
K-8	China/Pakistan	jet trainer		30	
Air Tractor AT-802	United States	Armed Reconnaissancs	AT-802U	12	12 AT-802U (acquired from the UAE in 2016, first spotted in service in January 2018)
UAV
ASN-209	China	surveillance			locally produced under license
WJ-700	China	reconnaissance / attack		10	
6 October	Egypt	reconnaissance / attack			
E-June 30	Egypt	reconnaissance / attack			
NUT	Egypt	reconnaissance / attack			
Jabbar-150 Drone	Egypt	'kamikaze' attack			
Jabbar-250 Drone	Egypt	reconnaissance / attack			
Hamza-1	Egypt	reconnaissance / attack			
Hamza-2	Egypt	reconnaissance / attack			
R4E-50 skyeye	United States	reconnaissance			
CAIG Wing Loong	China	reconnaissance			
CAIG Wing Loong II	China	reconnaissance			
CASC Rainbow	China	surveillance	CH-5		
Yabhon United 40	UAE	surveillance			locally produced under license
RQ-20 Puma	United States	surveillance			hand-launched system
324 Scarab	United States	surveillance			
Lipán M3	Argentina	surveillance			
Meggitt Banshee -	United Kingdom	target drone			
AirCamel	Egypt	reconnaissance			A multi-purpose, heavy-payload unmanned aerial vehicle with a total weight of 500 kg and a payload capacity of up to 250 kg. It is designed for both logistical operations, including firefighting and reconnaissance, as well combat applications, capable of carrying projectiles when required
H12 Poseidon	Egypt	reconnaissance			A long-range unmanned aerial vehicle with an operational range of over 150 km., also developed together with Swarmly. It is designed to operate in challenging environments, capable of overcoming GNSS satellite navigation jamming and harsh weather conditions. The UAV is equipped with electro-optical thermal surveillance systems to perform diverse reconnaissance tasks.
Ahmose	Egypt	reconnaissance			Developed in 2019, this UAV is built for reconnaissance and intelligence missions, featuring a 1,200 kg takeoff weight, 18-meter wingspan, 145 hp gasoline engine, and a 250 km/h maximum speed
Taba/Taba 2	Egypt	reconnaissance			UAVs produced in large quantities for reconnaissance and surveillance missions

=== Future ===
In 2014, Egypt planned to sign a large arms deal with Russia for the purchase of 24 MiG-35 fighter jets. In February 2015, MiG Director General Sergei Korotkov announced that the company was ready to supply the MiG-35 jets to Egypt should the country request them. However, in April 2015, Egypt signed a $2 billion contract for the purchase of 46 MiG-29M/M2 multi-role fighters instead.

Rosoboronexport and the Russian Helicopters holding are engaged in consultations with their Egyptian partners concerning a possible acquisition of Kamov Ka-52K ship-based helicopters for the 2 Mistral-class helicopter carriers that Egypt has agreed to buy from France. An Egyptian Air Force delegation had access to the helicopter before the official opening of the MAKS-2015.

In March 2019, it was reported that Egypt had reached an initial agreement with Russia for the sale of "over 20" Su-35 air superiority fighters in a deal valued at about US$2 billion. Deliveries were expected to begin as early as 2020 or 2021. However, deputy head of the Rosoboronexport Sergei Kornev denied any contract regarding the supply of Su-35 fighters to Egypt has been signed. In May 2020 Russia reportedly started producing the Su-35 under a contract with Egypt that was signed in 2018. Pictures taken in July 2020 reportedly showed five Su-35 in EAF camouflage on their delivery voyage. There was also a possibility of future orders for more Su-35 and the new MiG-35.

As of January 5, 2022, Egypt, Algeria, and Indonesia have cancelled plans of purchasing the Su-35.

On March 15, 2022, The United States offered to sell the McDonnell Douglas F-15E Strike Eagle to Egypt. The offer's amount of planes and price is to be determined.

In July 2025, Turkey announced Egypt's participation in the Kaan program, including co-production of the aircraft. This agreement reflects a strategic shift and a focus on practical industrial collaboration between the two nations.

In August 2025, Arab Organization for Industrialization (AOI) and Turkey's HAVELSAN signed an agreement to co-produce the Torgha VTOL UAV in Egypt, integrating AI-based real-time analytics for reconnaissance and surveillance missions. The Turkish ambassador in Cairo, Salih Mutlu Şen, announced that actual production has officially begun under the joint program, marking a new phase in Egypt–Turkey defense cooperation.

== Aircraft insignia ==
The roundel of the EAF consists of three circles, with the outside one being red, the middle one white, and the inner one being black, matching the Egyptian flag. Former roundels of the EAF included a similar variant with two green stars used from 1961 to 1973, and one with the old Egyptian crescent and three stars on a green background. Changes in markings reflect political changes.

=== Roundels ===
1932–1932	1932–1932	1932–1945	1945–1958	Proposed (1952)	1958–1972	1972–present

=== Tail marking ===
1932–1945	1945–1958	1958–1972	1972–1984	1984–present

== Egyptian Air Force ranks ==
Officers

Rank group	General/Flag/Air officers				Senior officers			Junior officers
Egyptian Air Force
Egyptian Air Force	فريق أول; Fariq 'awal	فريق; Fariq	لواء; Liwa	عميد; Amid	عقيد; Aqid	مقدم; Muqaddam	رائد; Ra'id	نقيب; Naqib	ملازم أول; Mulazim awwal	ملازم; Mulazim

Enlisted

Rank group	Senior NCOs				Junior NCOs	Enlisted
Egyptian Air Force
Egyptian Air Force	مساعد أول; Mosa'id awwal	مساعد; Mosa'id	رقيب أول; Raqib awwal	رقيب; Raqib	عريف 'arif	جندي; Jundi

== See also ==
- List of air forces
- National Authority for Remote Sensing and Space Sciences
- Atef Sadat
