= Dapper =

Dapper is an adjective describing a chic or fashionable man. It may also refer to:

== People ==
- Cliff Dapper (1920–2011), Major League Baseball catcher
- Olfert Dapper (1635–1689), Dutch physician and writer
- Marco Dapper (born 1983), American actor and model
- "Dapper" Danny Hogan (c. 1880–1928), American mob boss
- Dapper O'Neil (1920–2007), American politician

== Other uses ==
- Musée Dapper, a Parisian museum specializing in African art
- Dapper-class gunboat, a Royal Navy class of 20 gunboats built in 1854–1855
- "Dapper", a track from the album Genesis by Domo Genesis
- Dapper, a character in the 1610 play The Alchemist by Ben Jonson
- Dapper ORM, a simple object mapper for .NET Framework
- Dapper, a Colombian startup for public affairs management

== See also ==
- Dapper Dan (disambiguation)
- John Gotti (1940–2002), American mob boss known as "The Dapper Don"
- Dapper Day, a semi-annual gathering that takes place at the Walt Disney Parks and Resorts
