= Ryan Brougham =

Aircraft family by Ryan

Brougham
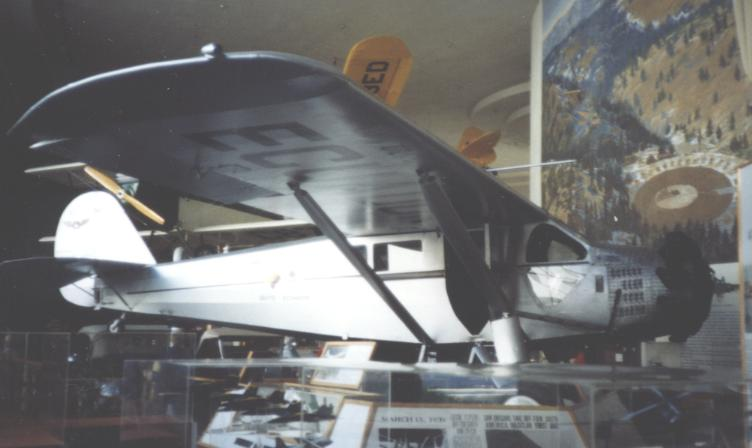
- Ryan B-5 Brougham NC9236 displayed in the San Diego Aerospace Museum in 1990

General information
- Type: Airliner
- National origin: United States
- Manufacturer: Ryan Aeronautical
- Designer: Donald A. Hall
- Number built: 212

History
- First flight: 1927

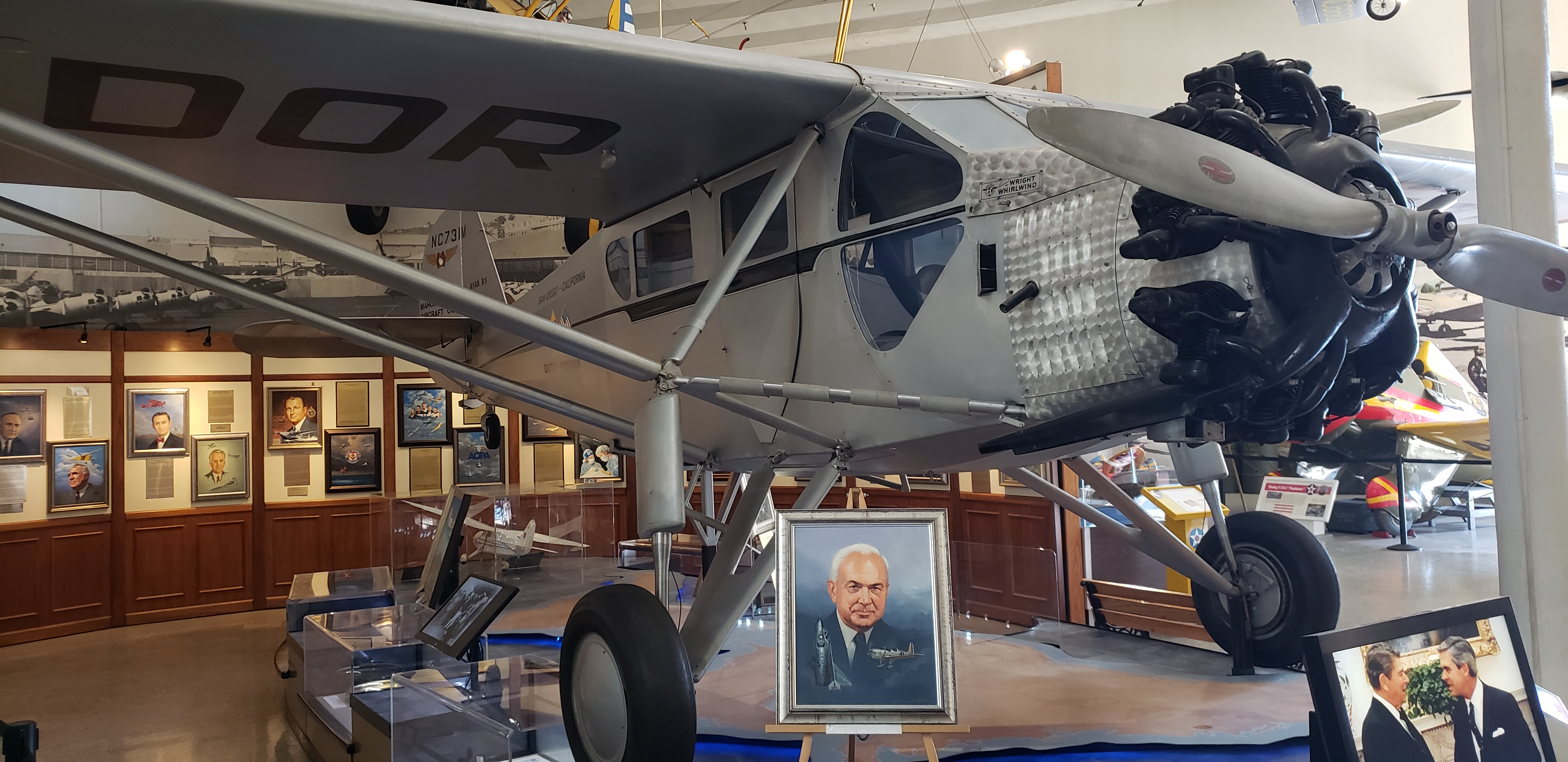
Ryan Brougham in San Diego Air and Space Museum

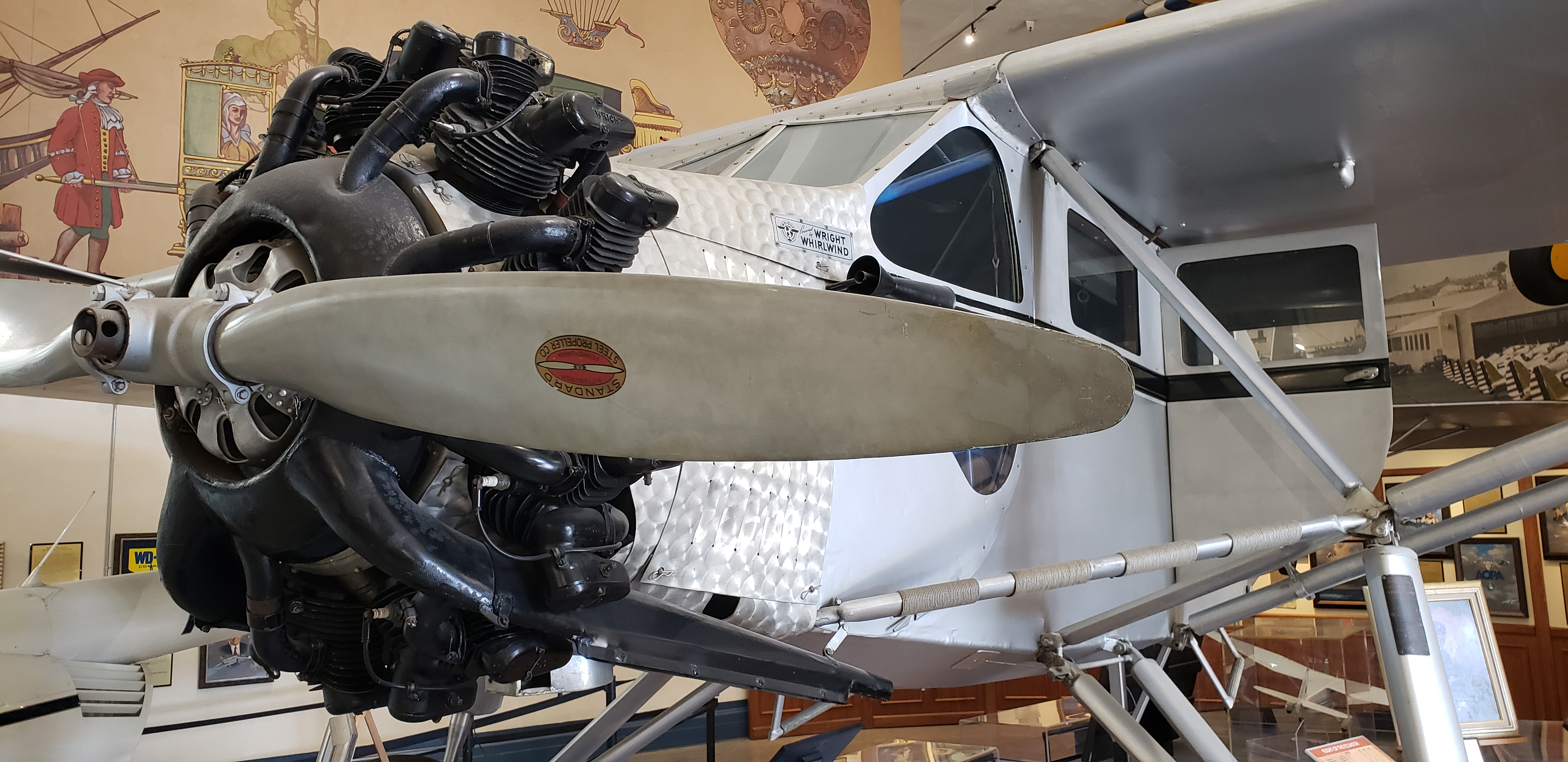
Ryan Brougham in San Diego Air and Space Museum

The Ryan Brougham was a small single-engine airliner produced in the United States in the late 1920s and early 1930s. Its design was reminiscent of the M-1 mailplane first produced by Ryan in 1926, and like it, was a high-wing, strut-braced monoplane of conventional design.

== Design and development ==
The plane was named by Tom Mathews after Henry Brougham, 1st Baron Brougham and Vaux, designer of the Brougham carriage.

Unlike the M-1, the Brougham had a fully enclosed cabin for the pilot and four passengers. The Brougham prototype was derived from the later M-2 and was powered by a 150 hp Wright-Martin "Hisso" (Note: Hispano-Suiza engines built under license by Wright were marketted as "Hisso" engines.) water cooled V8 engine. Originally priced at $12,200, the price was reduced to $9,700 when fitted with a Wright J-5, and $5,750 with the Hisso. One Brougham was fitted with floats. The only common parts shared with the famous Spirit of St. Louis and the first Ryan B-1s were the tail surfaces and a few of the wing fittings. Later B-1 Brougham production versions shared no common parts.

Welded Chrome moly steel tubing was used to make the fuselage. Wood was used for the wing, but did not have and dihedral or angle of incidence.

== Operational history ==
The first production B-1 Brougham was The Gold Bug, flown by Frank Hawks. It was preceded by three Hisso Brougham prototypes.

Charles Lindbergh had come to the factory to examine that first B-1, but had instead ordered a completely new aircraft to his specifications. He used the Ryan NYP Spirit of St. Louis on his record-breaking transatlantic flight of 1927. Hawks renamed his B-1 "Spirit of San Diego" and flew to Washington with his wife to greet the triumphant Lindbergh. In the ensuing glare of publicity, Hawks was hired by the Ryan Aircraft company to be its official representative.

With the public idolizing Lindbergh, Hawks toured the country, selling rides in the aircraft "like Lindy flew." His Spirit was actually painted gold, but looked the part to the public. Another reason for the success of the Brougham was its performance at the 1927 National Air Races in Spokane, Washington where Hawks, who had obtained a contract with Maxwell House Coffee, with the now renamed "Miss Maxwell House" came in first for speed in the Detroit news Air Transport Speed and Efficiency Trophy Race. Later, at the 1928 Ford Tudor Reliability Trial and Air Tour, Hawks placed sixth in "Miss Maxwell House".

Hawks popularized the type, which stimulated demand among small airlines and charter operators. The Brougham not only sold well in the domestic market, but was exported to China, Guatemala, Mexico and Salvador. Production peaked at 20 per month but was eventually halted by worsening economic conditions in the United States that led to the sale of the Ryan factory in October 1930.

== Aotearoa (G-AUNZ) ==
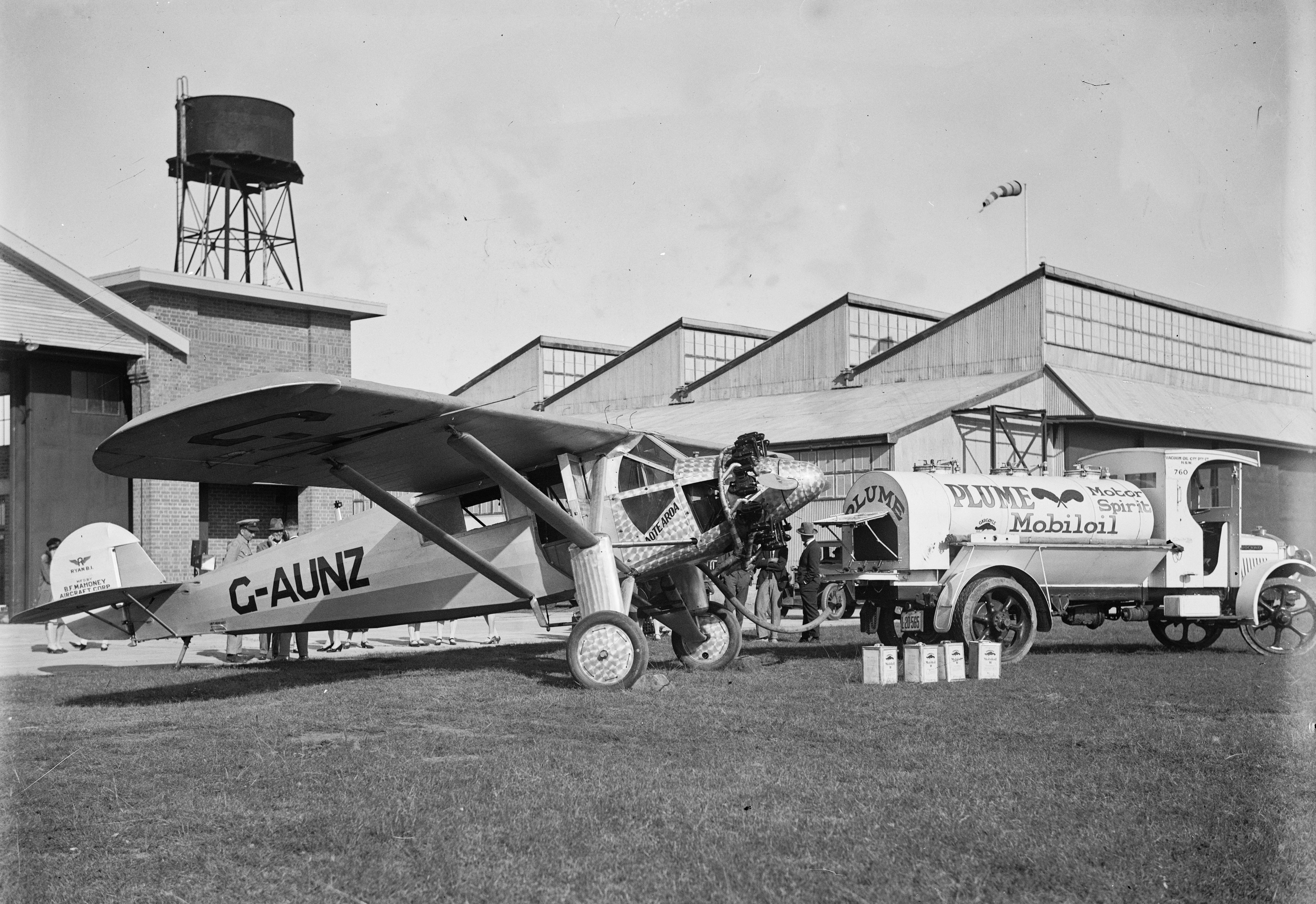
Moncrieff and Hood's Ryan B.1 Aotearoa', Mascot, Sydney, 10 January 1928

Lindbergh's successful trans-Atlantic flight led to a slightly modified Ryan Brougham being ordered for the first attempted trans-Tasman flight between Australia and New Zealand. Named Aotearoa, the Māori name for New Zealand, and crewed by New Zealanders Lieutenant John Moncrieff and Captain George Hood, the aircraft left Richmond near Sydney on 10 January 1928, on a flight expected to take about 14 hours. Radio signals were heard from the plane for 12 hours before abruptly ceasing. The aviators failed to arrive in New Zealand, and no trace of them or their aircraft has ever been found.

== Surviving aircraft ==
- s/n 141 (N6955) - Restored to airworthy condition and displayed at the Yanks Air Museum in Chino, California.

- s/n 194 (N9236) - On display at San Diego Air and Space Museum. Restored in the markings of NC731M, flown by Theodore Gildred from San Diego to Quito, Ecuador.

Three aircraft were modified to look like the Spirit of St. Louis for the 1957 movie starring James Stewart as Charles Lindbergh. One of the movie Ryans is at the Cradle of Aviation Museum. The second movie Ryan is at The Henry Ford museum. The third movie Ryan was hanging in the Terminal 1 at Lambert Field in St. Louis, Missouri, when it was removed in 1998. It is now on display at the Missouri History Museum in Forest Park (St. Louis).

Restoration work has continued on two aircraft by Scott Gifford of Hood River, Oregon. One of these two Broughams features modifications made in September 1927 to accommodate the transport of MGM mascot Leo the Lion on a transcontinental flight; many of its passenger cabin fittings were removed to make room for Leo's cage . Although this aircraft subsequently crashed en route, neither the pilot nor Leo were injured.

== Variants ==
- B-1 - initial production version with Wright J-5 engine (ca 150 built)
- B-2 - one-off version with extended wingspan for Charles Lindbergh promotional tour (1 built)
- B-3 - version with roomier cabin, sixth seat and larger tail (9 built)
- B-5 - production version with Wright J-6 engine (61 built)
- B-7 - version with Pratt & Whitney Wasp engine (8 built)

== Operators ==
Data from: Munson 1982a, p. 129.

- Aeronáutica del Sur
- Bowman Airways
- Corporación Aeronáutica de Transportes
- Embry-Riddle
- National Airlines
- Pickwick Latin American Airways
- Pike's Peak Airlines
- Robertson Airplane Service
- Ryan Airlines
- Thompson Flying Service
- Tri-State Airlines

== Specifications (B-1) ==
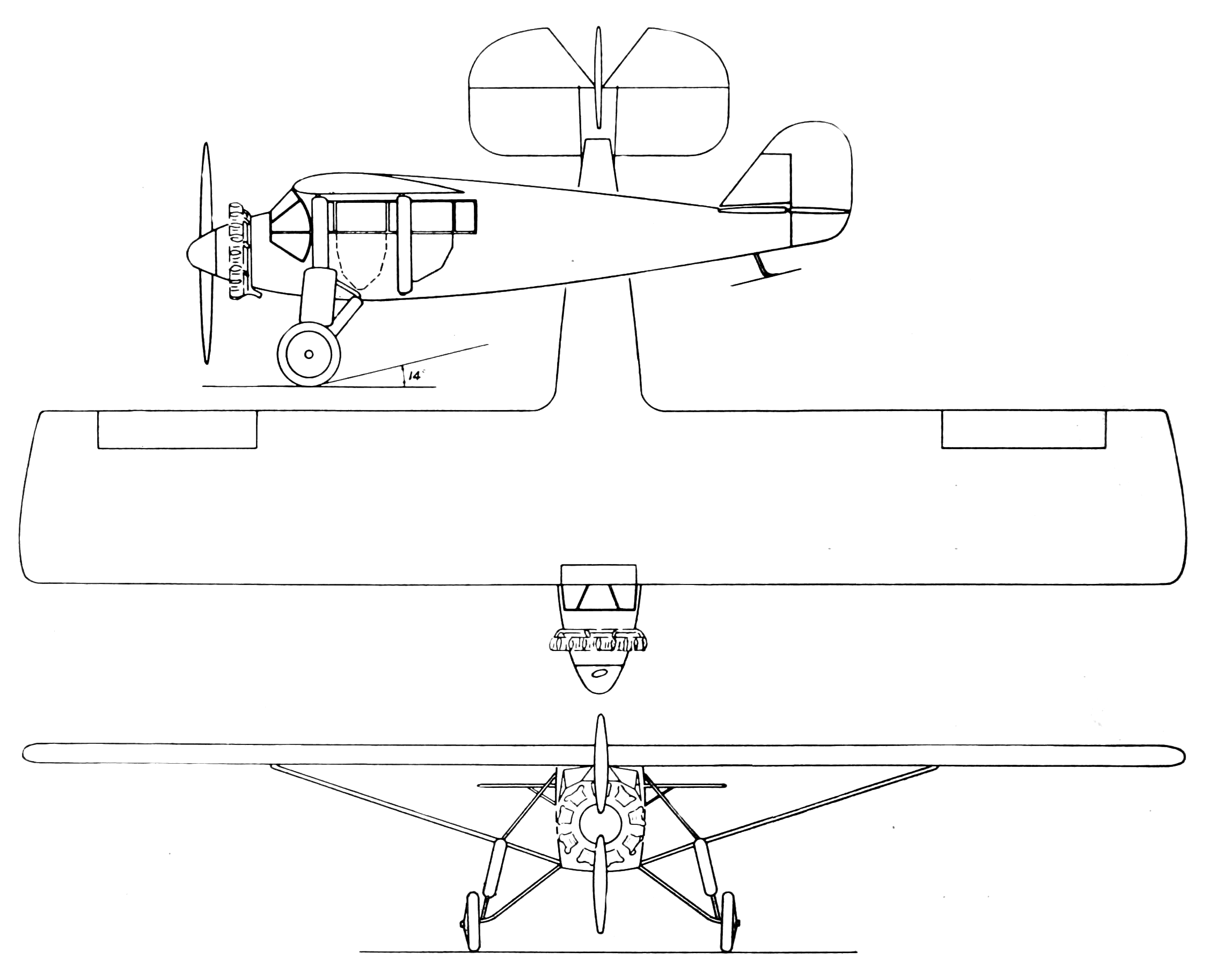
Ryan B-2 Brougham 3-view drawing Aero Digest May 1928

Data from

General characteristics

- Crew: One pilot
- Capacity: 4 passengers
- Length: 27 ft 9 in (8.46 m)
- Wingspan: 42 ft 0 in (12.80 m)
- Height: 8 ft 9 in (2.67 m)
- Wing area: 270 sq ft (25.1 m^{2})
- Empty weight: 1,870 lb (848 kg)
- Gross weight: 3,300 lb (1,497 kg)
- Powerplant: 1 × Wright J-5 , 225 hp (168 kW)

Performance

- Maximum speed: 125 mph (201 km/h, 109 kn)
- Range: 700 mi (1,130 km, 610 nmi)
- Service ceiling: 16,000 ft (4,900 m)

== See also ==
Aircraft of comparable role, configuration, and era

- Curtiss Thrush
- Yakovlev AIR-5

== Bibliography ==
- "Aircraft Restoration." Yanks Air Museum. Retrieved: 3 March 2009.
- "Collection." San Diego Air & Space Museum. Retrieved: 3 March 2009.
- Daniels, C.M. "Speed: The Story of Frank Hawks." Air Classics, Vol. 6, No. 2, December 1969.
- Hearn, Gail. "A Brougham fit for a King." Air & Space, 1 March 2006. Retrieved: 3 March 2009.
- The Illustrated Encyclopedia of Aircraft. London: Aerospace Publishing, 1985.
- Munson, Kenneth. Airliners from 1919 to the Present Day. London: Peerage Books, 1982a. ISBN 0-907408-36-2.
- Munson, Kenneth. U.S. Commercial Aircraft. London: Jane's Publishing, 1982b. ISBN 0-86720-628-4.
- "Ryan NYP 'Spirit of St. Louis'." Cradle of Aviation Museum. Retrieved: 3 March 2009.
- Taylor, Michael J.H. Jane's Encyclopedia of Aviation. London: Studio Editions, 1989. ISBN 0-517-10316-8.
