= Horace M. Trent =

American physicist

- Born: December 20, 1907; Bradley County, Tennessee
- Died: December 16, 1964 (aged 56)
- Citizenship: United States
- Education: M.A., PhD - Indiana University; B.A. - Berea College
- Known for: Finding that a bullwhip's crack is a sonic boom Trent analogy
- Spouse: Eva Mae (Manes) Trent
- Children: Marilyn; Sandra
- Scientific career
- Fields: Physics; Acoustics
- Institutions: Mississippi Agricultural and Mechanical College; Naval Research Laboratory; University of Maryland

Horace Maynard Trent (December 20, 1907 – December 16, 1964) was an American physicist best known for being part of the team that found that the crack of a bullwhip was actually a sonic boom. He is also the author of the currently accepted force-current analogy in physics known as the Trent analogy.

== Education and early career ==
Trent was born in Bradley County, Tennessee to his mother Lida L. Trent. His early years were spent on a family farm with his mother and sister, Jean. He earned his bachelor's degree from Berea College in 1929. By 1930 he was living with his mother in Starkville, Mississippi in a boarding house. He obtained his M.A. and Ph.D. from Indiana University where his thesis was on diaphragmless microphones. While working on his degrees he served on the faculties of Indiana University, Mississippi State, and Mississippi Agricultural and Mechanical College

He began his career as a member of the physics department at Mississippi State University in the early 1930s. In 1933, he married Eva Mae Manes of Indiana, who was also an Indiana University graduate, and they had two daughters, Marilyn and Sandra. While at MSU he became the faculty advisor for the Sigma Pi colony there and he was initiated into the organization when the colony became a chapter. In 1935 he was promoted to assistant professor and then to associate professor two years later.

== Naval Research Laboratory ==
Trent left Mississippi State in 1940 to accept an appointment at the Naval Research Laboratory (NRL), where he eventually became head of the Applied Mathematics Branch. His expertise in acoustics brought him an appointment to a special naval team assigned to do technical intelligence work on sound devices developed by the Nazis in Germany after World War II. By 1960, he was the supervisor of the Research Computation Center.

Trent's wife, Eva Mae, was also a mathematician in the Atmosphere and Astrophysics Division of NRL. In 1963, the NRL granted both of them a leave of absence to study and make recommendations for changes to Dartmouth College’s engineering sciences curriculum. The Ford Foundation financed the grant for his study of the college's mathematics, physics, chemistry, and engineering courses.

While at the NRL, Trent was able to keep teaching. He was an associate professor at the University of Maryland where he also became the Sigma Pi chapter there's faculty advisor.

== Noted work ==
In 1958, Trent was part of a team, along with Barry Bernstein and Donald A. Hall, that made the discovery of what causes a bullwhip’s crack. At the time, it was thought to be caused by leather in the tip smacking against other leather as it curled back in on itself. Bernstein, Trent, and Hall proved that it was really the whip exceeding the sound barrier.

In 1955 Trent wrote what is now called the Trent analogy to describe a power conjugate pair using through and across variables in linear graph form. Although he was not the first person to use the through and across variables, his work is still regarded as the modern understanding of through and across.

Trent was also noted for his activities in the field of standardization. He served as the US Navy's Project Officer for Mechanical Shock and Vibration, was a member of the Tripartite (American, British, Canadian) Standardization committee, and was a member of the International Organization for Standards on the ISO/TC 37 committee.

== Other work ==
He served on the editorial boards for the Journal of the Acoustical Society of America and the Journal of Mathematics and Mechanics. He was also a member of the Cosmos Club.

He became a member of the governing board of the American Institute of Physics in 1963.

He also held nine patent in such fields as underwater sound and mechanics.
