= The Spirit of St. Louis (film) =

1957 historical drama film by Billy Wilder

- Theatrical release poster
- Directed by: Billy Wilder
- Written by: Charles Lederer; Wendell Mayes; Billy Wilder
- Based on: The Spirit of St. Louis by Charles A. Lindbergh
- Produced by: Leland Hayward
- Starring: James Stewart
- Cinematography: Robert Burks; J. Peverell Marley
- Edited by: Arthur P. Schmidt
- Music by: Franz Waxman
- Distributed by: Warner Bros. Pictures
- Release date: February 21, 1957
- Running time: 135 minutes
- Country: United States
- Language: English
- Budget: $7 million
- Box office: $2.6 million

The Spirit of St. Louis is a 1957 American biographical historical drama film directed by Billy Wilder and starring James Stewart as Charles Lindbergh. The screenplay was adapted by Charles Lederer, Wendell Mayes and Wilder from Lindbergh's 1953 autobiographical account of his historic flight, which won the Pulitzer Prize in 1954.

Along with reminiscences of his early days in aviation, the film's storyline largely focuses on Lindbergh's lengthy preparation for, and accomplishment of, his history-making transatlantic flight in the purpose-built Spirit of St. Louis high-wing monoplane. His flight begins at Roosevelt Field and ends 33 hours later on May 21, 1927, when he lands safely at Le Bourget Field in Paris. The film ends with actual newsreel footage of Lindbergh's ticker tape parade in New York.

== Plot ==
On May 19, 1927, after waiting a week for the rain to stop on Long Island, New York, pilot Charles A. "Slim" Lindbergh tries to sleep in the Garden City Hotel near Roosevelt Field before his transatlantic flight from New York to Paris. His friend Frank Mahoney guards his hotel-room door from reporters. Unable to sleep, Lindbergh reminisces about his time as an airmail pilot.

In a flashback sequence, Lindbergh lands his old de Havilland biplane at a small airfield to refuel on the way to Chicago. Despite bad weather, he takes off, unaware that heavy snow has closed the Chicago landing field. Lindbergh is forced to bail out in a storm after running out of fuel. Recovering mail from his crashed DH-4, he continues to Chicago by train. A suspender salesman tells him that two airmen just died competing for the Orteig Prize for the first nonstop flight from New York City to Paris. (Note: The Orteig Prize offered by Paris hotelier Raymond Orteig could be claimed by aviators completing the flight in either direction.)

Lindbergh telephones Columbia Aircraft Corporation in New York from a small diner at the Lambert-St. Louis Flying Field. Quoted a price of $15,000 ($280,000 today) for a Bellanca high-wing monoplane, Lindbergh lobbies St. Louis financiers with a plan to fly the Atlantic in 40 hours in a stripped-down, single-engine aircraft. The backers are excited by Lindbergh's vision and dub the venture Spirit of St. Louis.

When the Bellanca deal falls apart because Columbia insists on selecting the pilot, Lindbergh approaches Ryan Airlines, a small manufacturer in San Diego, California. Frank Mahoney, the company's owner and president, promises to build a suitable monoplane in just 90 days. With Ryan's chief engineer Donald Hall, a design takes shape. To decrease weight, Lindbergh refuses to install a radio or other heavy equipment, even a parachute, and plans to navigate by "dead reckoning". With no autopilot function available, Lindbergh will not be able to sleep during the 40 hour flight. With the deadline pressing, Ryan workers agree to work around the clock, completing the monoplane in just 62 days. However, by the time it is completed, Nungesser and Coli have begun their attempt, which is ultimately tragically unsuccessful.

Lindbergh flies The Spirit of St. Louis to New York, stopping at Lambert Field (St. Louis Lambert International Airport) on the way to show the aircraft to his investors. He prepares for the flight at Roosevelt Field, ensuring that 450 gallons of fuel is on board for the long flight. In the cramped cockpit, which does not allow direct forward view, the magnetic compass must fit above his head; a young woman offers her compact mirror, which is attached with chewing gum so that Lindbergh can read the compass. Mahoney secretly slips a Saint Christopher medal into a bag of sandwiches on board.

As the weather clears, The Spirit of St. Louis trundles down the muddy runway and barely clears power lines and treetops. A newspaper headline reads: "Lindy Is Off!" Every hour, Lindbergh switches fuel tanks to keep the airplane's weight balanced. As he flies over Cape Cod, Lindbergh realizes that he has not slept in 28 hours. He recalls past times when he had slept on railroad tracks, short bunk beds, and under a windmill. When he begins to doze, he is awakened by a fly. Over Nova Scotia, he sees a motorcyclist below, remembering his own Harley-Davidson motorcycle that he had once traded as partial payment for his first aircraft, a World War I war-surplus Curtiss Jenny.

Over the seemingly endless Atlantic, Lindbergh remembers barnstorming across the Midwest in a flying circus. After 18 hours, ice forms on the wings and engine, and the aircraft begins losing altitude. Lindbergh changes course and the ice breaks off in the warmer air; the engine, which had stopped, is restarted. Back on course, his compasses begin malfunctioning, forcing him to navigate by the stars. By dawn, he falls asleep, and the monoplane gradually descends in a wide spiral toward the ocean. Sunlight reflecting off the compact's mirror hits his eyes and awakens him just in time to regain flight control.

Seeing a seagull, Lindbergh realizes that he is close to land. He tries without success to hail a fisherman below. Sighting land, he determines that he has reached Dingle Bay, Ireland. Pulling out a sandwich from a paper bag, Lindbergh discovers the hidden Saint Christopher medal and hangs it on the instrument panel. Crossing the English Channel and the coast of France, Lindbergh follows the Seine up to Paris as darkness falls.

Finally seeing the city lights ahead of him, Lindbergh approaches Le Bourget Airfield in the dark, becoming disoriented by panning spotlights aimed into the sky. He glimpses strange movements and lights below, in reality huge crowds of people and traffic in and around Le Bourget. Confused by this chaos, Lindbergh begins his landing approach, quickly becoming panicked. As he goes lower, he whispers "Oh, God, help me!"

Landing safely and bringing The Spirit of St. Louis to a full stop, Lindbergh is rushed by hordes of people while sitting in the plane. As flash powder ignites and photos are taken, Lindbergh is carried triumphantly on people's shoulders toward a hangar. An exhausted Lindbergh eventually realizes that the crowds, numbering 200,000, are cheering for him and his achievement. On returning to New York City, Lindbergh, having now become a national hero, is given a huge ticker tape parade, with four million people lining the parade route.

== Cast ==
- James Stewart as Charles Lindbergh
- Murray Hamilton as Harlan A. "Bud" Gurney
- Patricia Smith as Mirror Girl
- Bartlett Robinson as Benjamin Frank Mahoney
- Arthur Space as Donald A. Hall
- Marc Connelly as Father Hussman
- Charles Watts as O.W. Schultz
- Aaron Spelling as Mr. Fearless (uncredited)
- Richard Deacon as Charles A. Levine (uncredited)

== Production ==
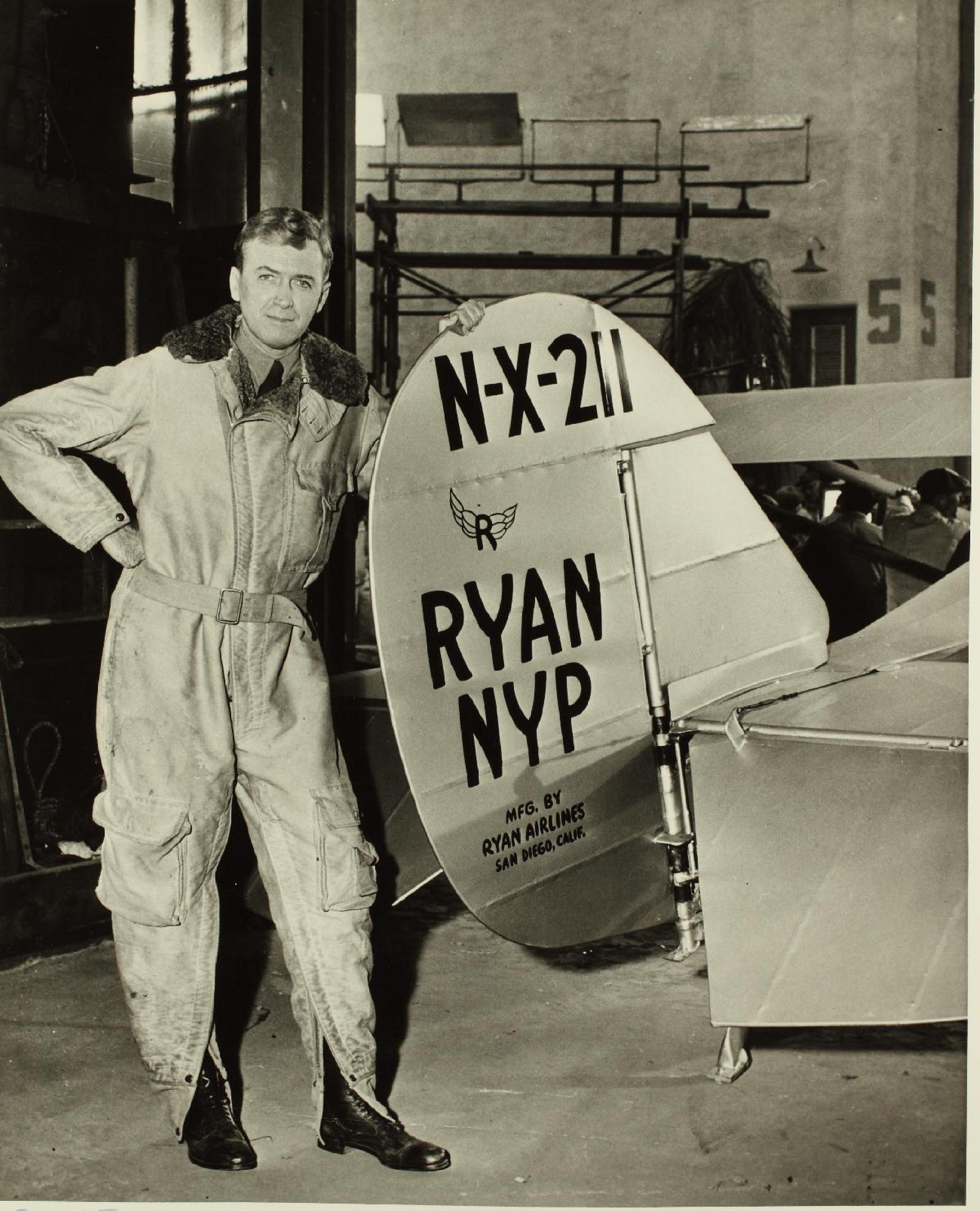
Jimmy Stewart with the aircraft replica used in the film

Billy Wilder was looking to collaborate on the script with a writer but had not found someone he would work with. He was reading an article in the newspaper by Colin Goring on bridge, and next to the column was a review of one of Wendell Mayes' television plays. This led to Mayes being hired to work on the script. Mayes said, "We simply wrote a screenplay together, in a room together, walking around, talking it out, We would write a scene just as you would imagine a scene would be written. I would say, "Suppose he says this . . . ," and Billy would say, "Yeah, let him say that, and then he says . . . " It isn't the best way in the world to write, and it doesn't work for everybody, but it does work for Billy Wilder. We would scribble it down on a piece of paper, then call in a secretary, and she takes it out and types it, and then we look at it. "

Before production began in August 1955, producer Leland Hayward offered the role of Lindbergh to John Kerr, star of Tea and Sympathy, who turned it down. (Note: An urban myth has developed involving James Dean. After completing the film Giant in mid-1955, Dean was allegedly offered the role to portray Lindbergh in The Spirit of St. Louis, but the actor died in an auto accident on September 30, 1955, before the production's filming could begin. At the time of his death, Dean was 25, the same age as Lindbergh when he made his historic flight.) Numerous sources indicate that Stewart was lobbying Warner Bros. executives for the role as early as 1954. Stewart did not take a salary for the role in return for a share of the gross. At age 47 when the film was shot, Stewart underwent a strenuous diet and regimen to more closely resemble the 25-year-old Lindbergh of 1927. Stewart (with hair bleached blond) was ultimately cast as Lindbergh, but his age was pointedly an issue in post-production reviews.

Stewart had a lifelong passion for aviation and Lindbergh's story. Later in his life, he recalled Lindbergh's famous flight as among the most significant events of his youth, one that led him to seek a career as an aviator. Like Lindbergh, Stewart had been an USAAF pilot, and both eventually retired from the U.S. Air Force Reserve at the grade of brigadier general.

To accurately depict the transatlantic flight, three replicas, at a cost of $1.3 million (equal to $15.6 million today), were made of the Spirit of St. Louis for the various filming units stateside, in Europe and in the studio. Stewart purchased a similar Ryan Brougham that was modified under Lindbergh's supervision. In 1959, Stewart donated the aircraft to the Henry Ford Museum in Dearborn, Michigan. The second replica was donated to the San Diego Aerospace Museum but was destroyed in 1978 when a fire gutted the Electric Building in Balboa Park that housed the museum. The third replica is displayed in the Missouri History Museum in St. Louis.

Filming took place at the Santa Maria Public Airport in Santa Maria, California, at what is currently the site of Allan Hancock College. A non-flying replica for ground shots was also built, which currently hangs in the Minneapolis−Saint Paul International Airport.

Aerial sequences were directed by Paul Mantz and were taken from a North American B-25 bomber converted as a camera platform for photography. (Note: On a bet from Stewart, the director Wilder flew on top of a biplane for a wingwalker stunt.)

During pre-production in August 1955, a small film crew was sent to New York to shoot footage at Roosevelt Field on Long Island and later to film aerial sequences over the Appalachian Mountains in Nova Scotia and at St. John's, Newfoundland, recreating the initial stages of the transatlantic flight. Principal photography began on September 2, 1955, with filming taking place at L'aérodrome de Guyancourt, near Versailles, which would stand in for Le Bourget. Difficulties with Stewart's schedule led to the abandonment of aerial sequences that had been planned with Stewart actually flying one of the replicas over European locales. Ultimately, staged scenes using a mock-up on a sound stage had to suffice. The film's schedule was disrupted throughout the fall and only resumed in November when Stewart had completed two other films. The original 64-day schedule ballooned into a 115-day marathon, as weather and Stewart's unavailability hampered the production, with final sequences shot in March 1956. The film eventually cost $7,000,000.

Aaron Spelling appears as Mr. Fearless in an uncredited role that marks an early foray into acting.

== Reception ==
=== Critics ===
The film garnered mixed reviews, with Bosley Crowther at The New York Times praising the "... exciting and suspenseful episodes" while noting that Stewart's performance as Lindbergh did not convey the human side well:

"We see very little of his basic nature, his home life or what makes him tick. As Mr. Stewart plays him, with his usual diffidence, he is mainly a type. That's too bad, for after all these years of waiting, it would be interesting if we could see what it was about the fellow that made him uniquely destined for his historic role.

However, the film was commended for its special effects and Stewart's performance. Time in its 1957 review describes the actor's success in conveying on screen the public's perception of Lindbergh's feat three decades earlier:

Stewart, for all his professional, 48-year-old boyishness, succeeds almost continuously in suggesting what all the world sensed at the time: that Lindbergh's flight was not the mere physical adventure of a rash young 'flying fool' but rather a journey of the spirit, in which, as in the pattern of all progress, one brave man proved himself for all mankind as the paraclete of a new possibility.

In recent years, the film has regained some of its luster, and a modern reevaluation has centered on the screenplay's characterization of Lindbergh and the methodical depiction of the preparations for the momentous flight. The Smithsonian Institution periodically screens the film as part of its "classic" series, and the DVD re-release in 2006, with remixed and digitized elements and a small number of special features, has evoked commentary such as "captivating" and "suspenseful".

=== Commercial reception ===
The film opened at Radio City Music Hall in New York City on February 21, 1957 and helped set a Broadway record gross of $829,500 for Washington's Birthday week with its gross of $160,000 (also a record for Washington's Birthday).

Overall, early results had not been promising: The studio found out during test screenings that people under the age of 40 tended to be unaware of Lindbergh and his accomplishments. To address this problem, Warner sent their contract player Tab Hunter, who was popular with teenagers, on a tour of schools and colleges in 12 cities. When put into general release on April 20, 1957, The Spirit of St. Louis resulted in one of Warner's biggest financial failures in its history till then.

== Awards and honors ==
At the 1958 Academy Awards, Louis Lichtenfield earned a nomination for Best Special Effects.

The film was ranked #69 on the American Film Institute list AFI's 100 Years...100 Cheers.
