= Spirit of St. Louis =

Monoplane flown solo by Charles Lindbergh

Spirit of St. Louis Ryan NYP
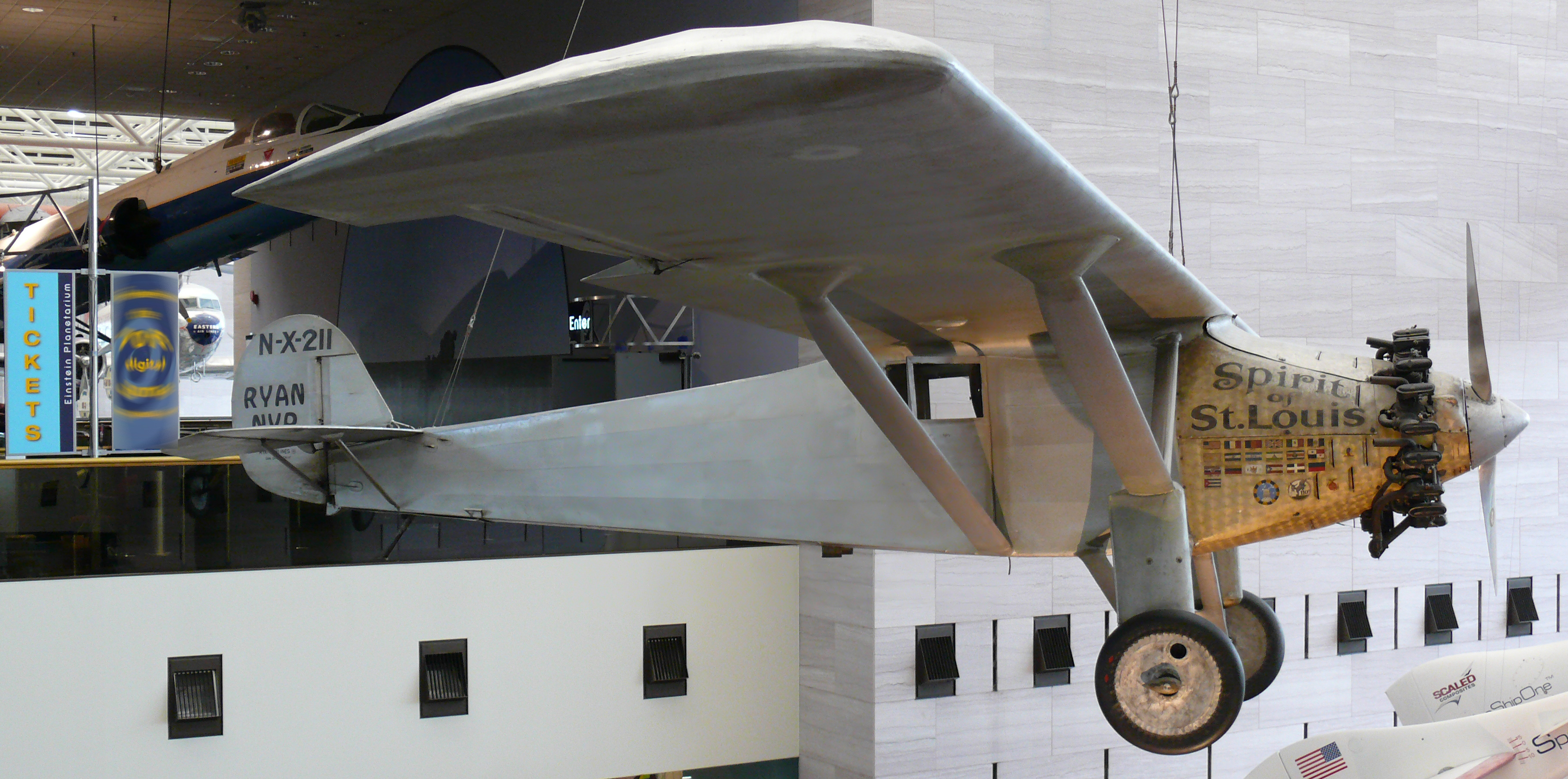
- The Spirit at the National Air and Space Museum

General information
- Type: Long-range aircraft [for record attempt]
- Manufacturer: Ryan Airlines
- Designer: Donald A. Hall
- Owners: Charles Lindbergh
- Number built: 1 (not including later replicas and reproductions)
- Registration: N-X-211
- Flights: 174
- Total hours: 489 hours, 28 minutes

History
- Manufactured: 1927; 99 years ago
- First flight: April 28, 1927
- Retired: April 30, 1928
- Developed from: Ryan M-2
- Preserved at: National Air and Space Museum

The Spirit of St. Louis (formally the Ryan NYP; registered N-X-211) is the custom-built, single-engine, single-seat, high-wing monoplane that Charles Lindbergh flew on May 20–21, 1927, on the first solo nonstop transatlantic flight from Long Island, New York, to Paris, France, for which Lindbergh won the $25,000 Orteig Prize.

Lindbergh took off in the Spirit from Roosevelt Airfield in Garden City, New York, and landed 33 hours, 30 minutes later at Aéroport Le Bourget in Paris, a distance of approximately 3,600 miles (5,800 km). He also flew this aircraft on numerous occasions, delivering mail in and out of the United States. One of the best-known aircraft in the world, the Spirit was built by Ryan Airlines in San Diego, California, owned and operated at the time by Benjamin Franklin Mahoney, who had purchased it from its founder, T. Claude Ryan, in 1926. The Spirit is on permanent display at the Smithsonian Institution's National Air and Space Museum in Washington, D.C. The exhibit, Pioneers of Flight, reopened in 2025 following extensive renovation and modernization.

== Development ==
Officially known as the "Ryan NYP" (for New York to Paris), the single-engine monoplane was designed by Donald A. Hall of Ryan Airlines and named the "Spirit of St. Louis" in honor of Lindbergh's supporters from the St. Louis Raquette Club in his then hometown of St. Louis, Missouri. To save design time, the NYP was loosely based on the company's 1926 Ryan M-2 mailplane, the main difference being the NYP's 4,000-mile (6,400 km) range. As a nonstandard design, the government assigned it the registration number N-X-211 (for "experimental"). Hall documented his design in "Engineering Data on the Spirit of St. Louis", which he prepared for the National Advisory Committee for Aeronautics (NACA) and is included as an appendix to Lindbergh's 1953 Pulitzer Prize winning book The Spirit of St. Louis.

B.F. "Frank" Mahoney and Claude Ryan had co-founded the company as an airline in 1925 and Ryan remained with the company after Mahoney bought out his interest in 1926, although there is some dispute as to how involved Ryan may have been in its management after selling his share. It is known, however, that Hawley Bowlus was the factory manager who oversaw construction of the Ryan NYP, and that Mahoney was the sole owner at the time of Donald A. Hall's hiring.

The Spirit was designed and built in San Diego to compete for the $25,000 Orteig Prize for the first nonstop flight between New York and Paris. Hall and Ryan Airlines staff worked closely with Lindbergh to design and build the Spirit in just 60 days. Although what was actually paid to Ryan Airlines for the project is not clear, Mahoney agreed to build the plane for $6,000 and said that there would be no profit; he offered an engine, instruments, etc. at cost. After first approaching several major aircraft manufacturers without success, in early February 1927 Lindbergh, who as a U.S. Air Mail pilot was familiar with the good record of the M-1 with Pacific Air Transport, wired, "Can you construct Whirlwind engine plane capable flying nonstop between New York and Paris ...?"

Mahoney was away from the factory, but Ryan answered, "Can build plane similar M-1 but larger wings... delivery about three months." Lindbergh wired back that due to competition, delivery in less than three months was essential. Many years later, John van der Linde, chief mechanic of Ryan Airlines, recalled, "But nothing fazed B.F. Mahoney, the young sportsman who had just bought Ryan." Mahoney telegraphed Lindbergh back the same day: "Can complete in two months."

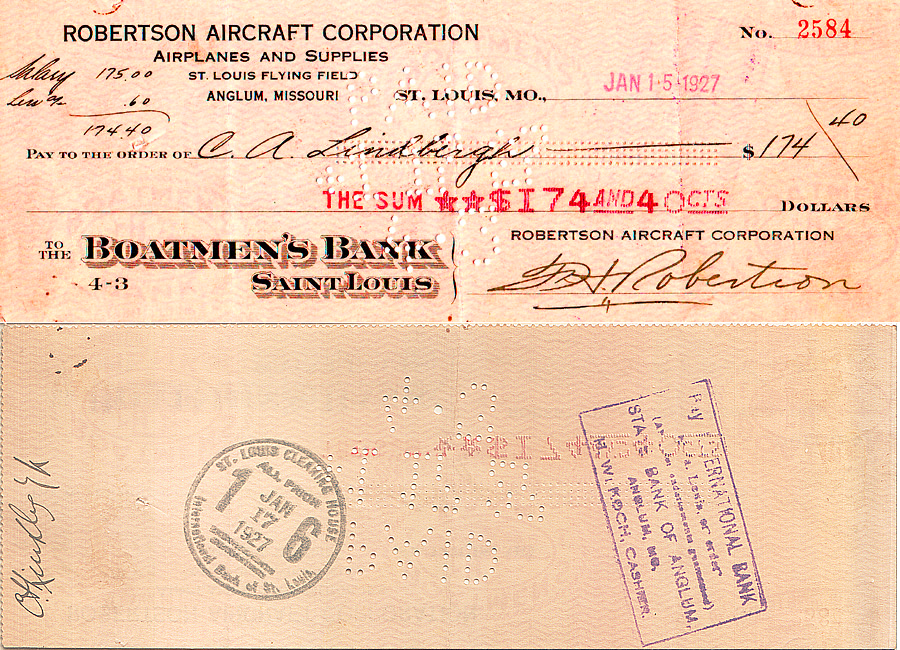
Part of the funding for the Spirit of St. Louis came from Lindbergh's own earnings as a U.S. Air Mail pilot (January 15, 1927 RAC paycheck).

Lindbergh arrived in San Diego on February 23 and toured the factory with Mahoney, meeting Bowlus, chief engineer Donald Hall, and sales manager A. J. Edwards. After further discussions between Mahoney, Hall and Lindbergh, Mahoney offered to build the Spirit for $10,580, restating his commitment to deliver it in 60 days. Lindbergh contributed $2,000 toward the cost of the Spirit that he had saved from his earnings as an Air Mail pilot for Robertson Aircraft Corporation. The rest was provided by the Spirit of St. Louis Organization.

Lindbergh was convinced: "I believe in Hall's ability; I like Mahoney's enthusiasm. I have confidence in the character of the workmen I've met." He then went to the airfield to familiarize himself with a Ryan aircraft, either an M-1 or an M-2, then telegraphed his St. Louis backers and recommended the deal, which was quickly approved.

Mahoney lived up to his commitment. Working exclusively on the aircraft and closely with Lindbergh, the staff completed the Spirit of St. Louis 60 days after Lindbergh arrived in San Diego. Powered by a Wright Whirlwind J-5C 223-hp radial engine, it had a 14 m (46-foot) wingspan, 3 m (10 ft) longer than the M-1, to accommodate the heavy load of 1,610 L (425 gal) of fuel. In his 1927 book We, Lindbergh acknowledged the builders' achievement with a photograph captioned "The Men Who Made the Plane", identifying: "B. Franklin Mahoney, president, Ryan Airlines", Bowlus, Hall and Edwards standing with the aviator in front of the completed aircraft.

== Design ==
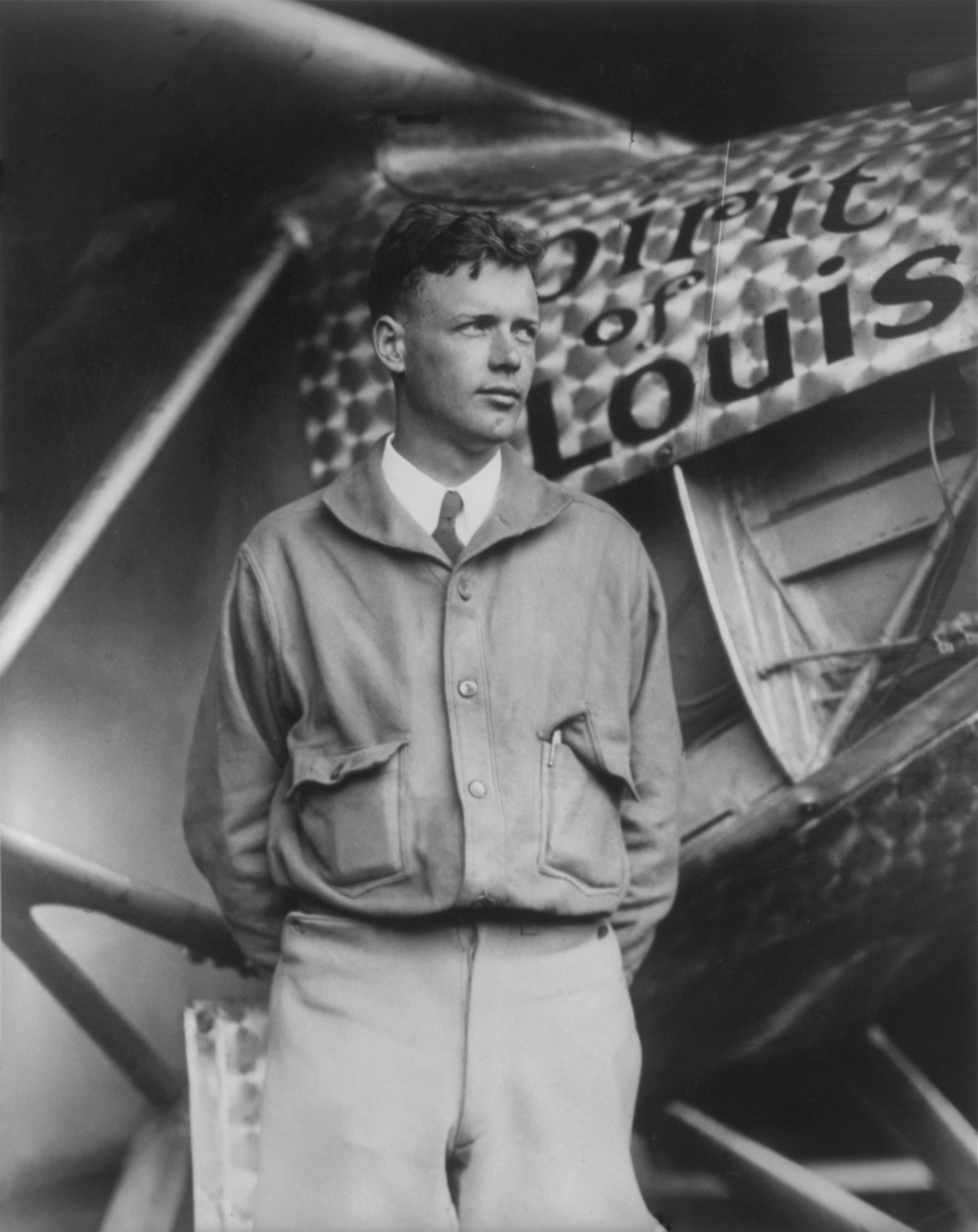
Lindbergh and the Spirit of St. Louis at Roosevelt Field, with perlée engine-turned finishing on the nose panels.

Lindbergh believed that multiple engines resulted in a greater risk of failure while a single-engine design would give him greater range. To increase fuel efficiency, the Spirit of St. Louis was also one of the most advanced and aerodynamically streamlined designs of its era, as detailed by Popular Science magazine in 1957: "The fuselage curved from spinner to tail in one unbroken line. All struts were faired with balsa, then covered with sheet aluminum. The shock absorbers were streamlined. Even the wheels were covered with a doped fabric. The gap between fin and rudder was sealed with a strip of fabric. And the engine cowling was faired into the fuselage. The result of this unheard-of streamlining was a maximum speed ten m.p.h. higher than that of the M-2--even though The Spirit of St. Louis weighed twice as much!"

Lindbergh believed that a flight made in a single-seat monoplane designed around the dependable Wright J-5 Whirlwind radial engine provided the best chance of success. The Ryan NYP had a total fuel capacity of 450 U.S. gallons (1,700 L; 370 imp gal) or 2,710 pounds (1,230 kg) of gasoline, which was necessary in order to have the range to make the anticipated flight non-stop. The fuel was stored in five fuel tanks, a forward tank – 88 U.S. gal (330 L; 73 imp gal), the main – 209 U.S. gal (790 L; 174 imp gal), and three wing tanks – total of 153 U.S. gal (580 L; 127 imp gal). Lindbergh modified the design of the plane's "trombone struts" attached to the landing gear to provide a wider wheelbase in order to accommodate the weight of the fuel.

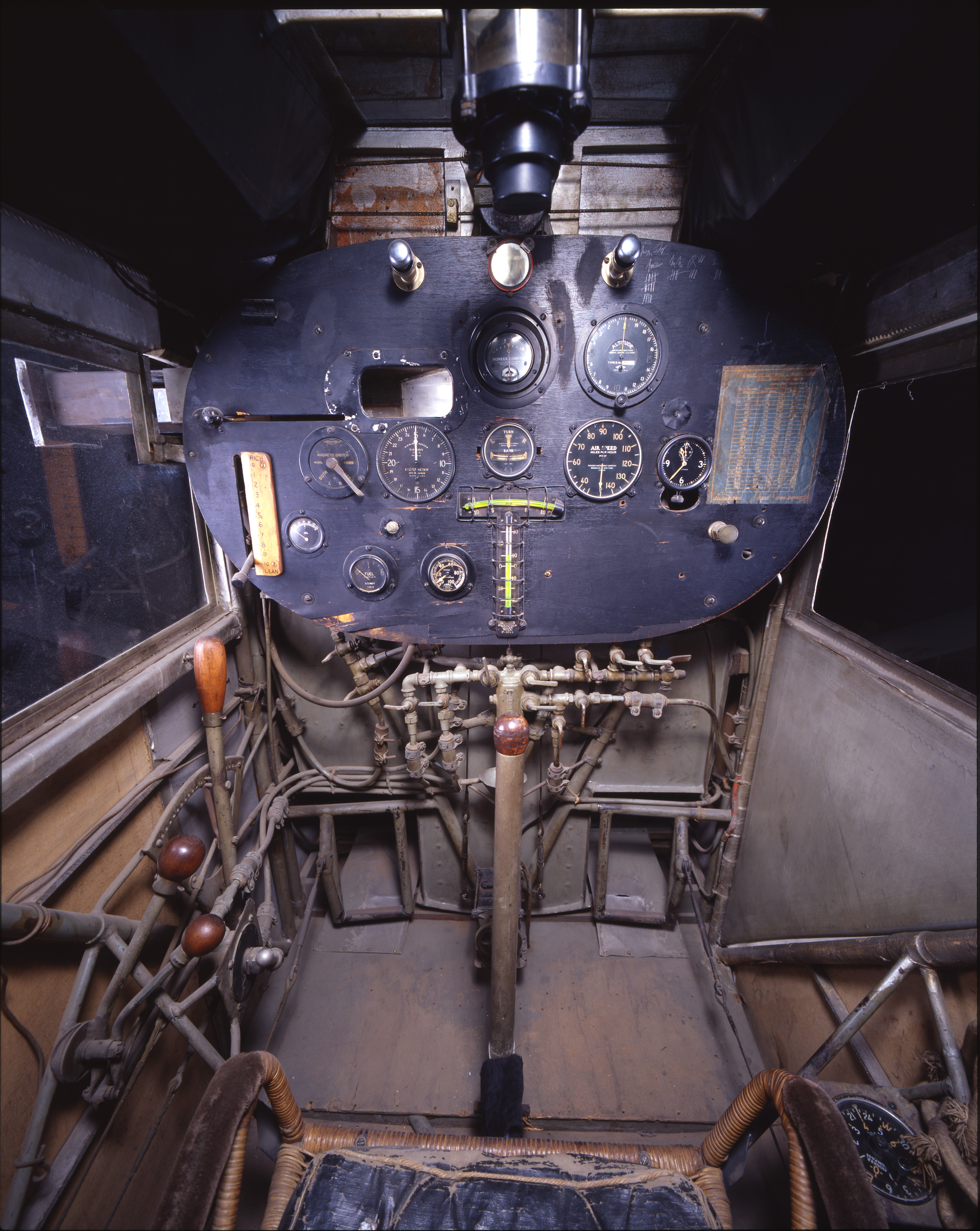
View of the cockpit.

At Lindbergh's request, the large main and forward fuel tanks were placed in the forward section of the fuselage, in front of the pilot, with the oil tank acting as a firewall. This arrangement improved the center of gravity and reduced the risk of the pilot being crushed to death between the main tank and the engine in the event of a crash. This design decision meant that there could be no front windshield, and that forward visibility would be limited to the side windows. This did not concern Lindbergh as he was accustomed to flying in the rear cockpit of mail planes with mail bags in the front. When he wanted to see forward, he would slightly yaw the aircraft and look out the side. To provide some forward vision as a precaution against hitting ship masts, trees, or structures while flying at low altitude, a Ryan employee who had served in the submarine service installed a periscope which Lindbergh helped design. It is unclear whether the periscope was used during the flight. The instrument panel housed fuel pressure, oil pressure and temperature gauges, a clock, altimeter, tachometer, airspeed indicator, bank and turn indicator, and a liquid magnetic compass. The main compass was mounted behind Lindbergh in the cockpit, and he read it using the mirror from a women's makeup case which was mounted to the ceiling using chewing gum. Lindbergh also installed a newly developed Earth Inductor Compass made by the Pioneer Instrument Company which allowed him to more accurately navigate while taking account of the magnetic declination of the earth. Lindbergh's ultimate arrival in Ireland deviated from his flight plan by just a few miles.

Lindbergh sat in a cramped cockpit which was 36 in × 32 in × 52 in (91 cm × 81 cm × 132 cm) in width, length, and height. It was so small, Lindbergh could not stretch his legs, nevertheless it was to be his home for nearly two days and nights over the Atlantic. The Spirit of St. Louis was powered by a 223 hp (166 kW), air-cooled, nine-cylinder Wright J-5C Whirlwind radial engine, by most accounts an exceptionally engineered powerplant by engineer Charles Lawrance. The engine was rated for a maximum operating time of 9,000 hours (more than one year if operated continuously) and had a special mechanism that could keep it clean for the entire New York-to-Paris flight. It was also, for its day, very fuel-efficient, enabling longer flights carrying less fuel weight for given distances. (Note: The "History Detectives" (Season 3, Episode 1; Season 4, Episode 5) PBS program confirms through three documents and interviews of several experts that the uncle of two brothers, now in possession of the letter (image on first reference), did indeed build the J5 rotary aeronautical engine of the Spirit of St. Louis.) Another key feature of the Whirlwind radial engine was that it was rated to self-lubricate the engine's valves for 40 hours continuously. Lubricating, or "greasing," the moving external engine parts was a necessity most aeronautical engines of the day required, to be done manually by the pilot or ground crew prior to every flight and would have been otherwise required somehow to be done during the long flight.

The engine was built at Wright Aeronautical in Paterson, New Jersey, by a 24-year-old engine builder, Tom Rutledge, who was disappointed that he was assigned to the unknown aviator, Lindbergh. Four days after the flight, he received a letter of congratulations from the Wright management.

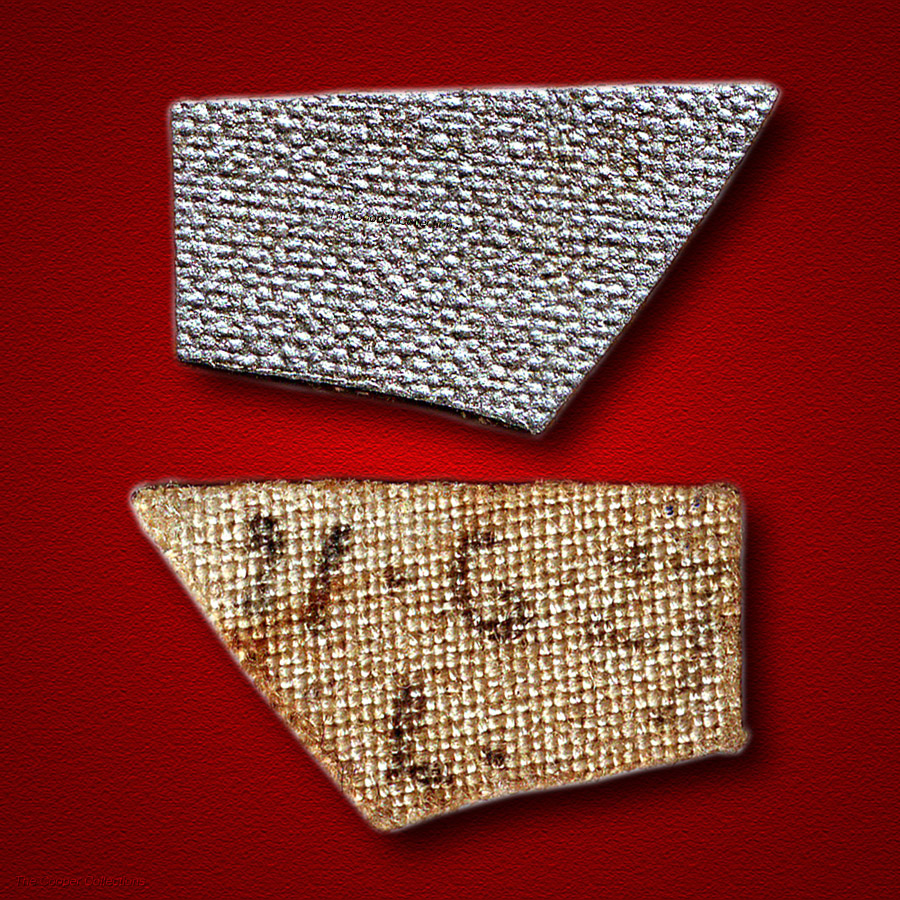
Sample of the treated fabric from the Spirit of St. Louis

The race to win the prize required time-saving design compromises. Donald A. Hall decided that the empennage (tail assembly) and wing control surfaces would not be altered from his original Ryan M-2 design, thus minimizing redesign time that was not available without delaying the flight. The result was less aerodynamic stability; nevertheless, the experienced Lindbergh approved the unaltered design. This setup resulted in a negatively stable design that tended to randomly introduce unanticipated pitch, yaw, and bank (roll) elements into its overall flight characteristics. There is a dispute regarding whether Hall and Lindbergh also preferred this design because they anticipated that the continuous corrections to the random movements of the aircraft would help to keep Lindbergh awake during the estimated 40-hour flight. Whether or not the unstable design was deliberately retained to help fight fatigue, Lindbergh did later write how these random unanticipated movements helped keep him awake at various times during the flight. The stiff wicker seat in the cockpit was also purposely uncomfortable, although custom-fitted to Lindbergh's tall and lanky frame.

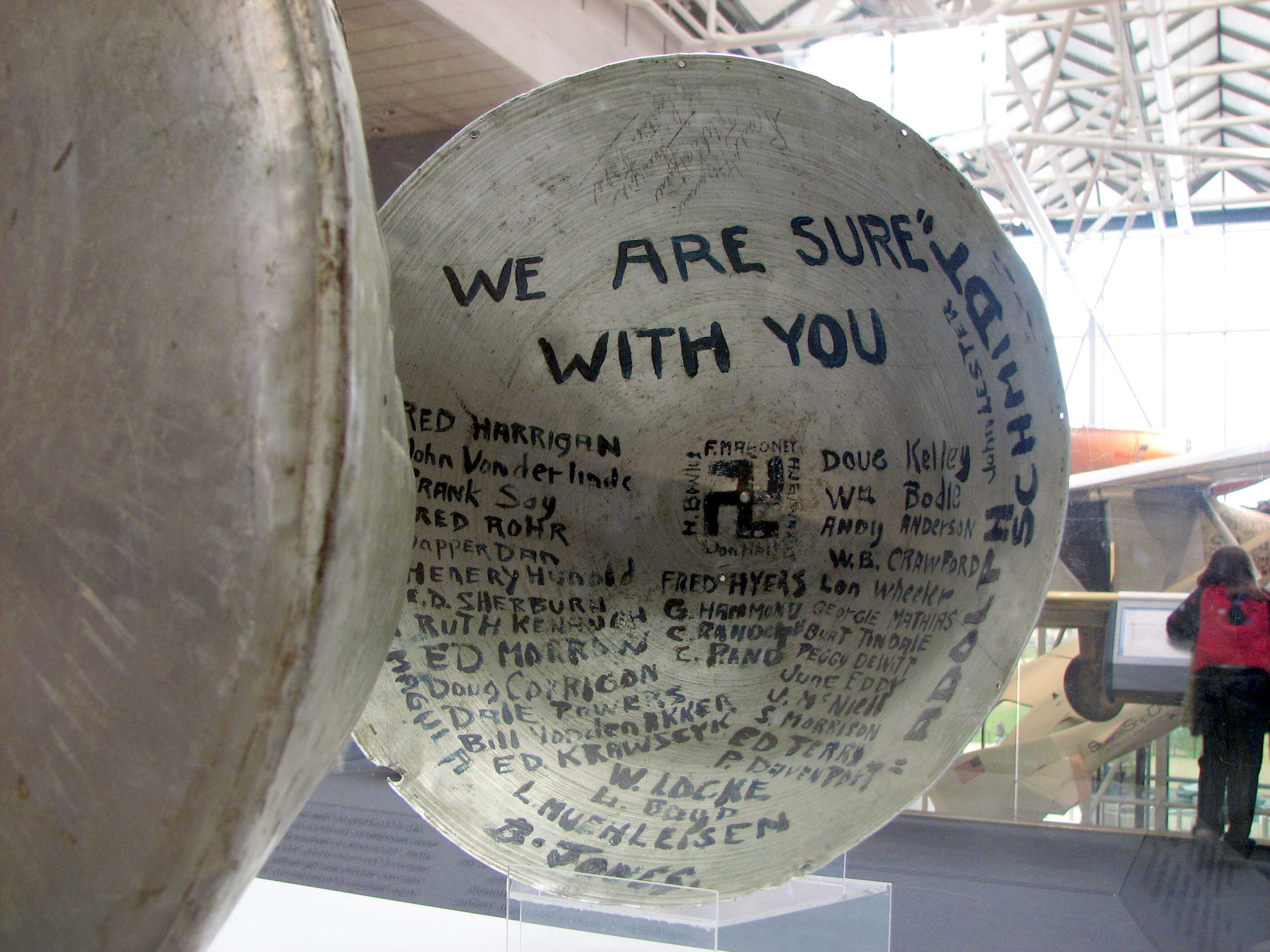
Inside of the original propeller spinner of the Spirit of St. Louis

Lindbergh also insisted that unnecessary weight be eliminated, even going so far as to cut the top and bottom off of his flight map. He carried no radio in order to save weight and because the radios of the period were unreliable and difficult to use while flying solo. Also, although he was an airmail pilot, he refused to carry souvenir letters on the transatlantic journey, insisting that every spare ounce be devoted to fuel. The fuselage was made of treated fabric over a metal tube frame, while the wings were made of fabric over a wood frame. The plywood material that was used to build most of Lindbergh's plane was made at the Haskelite Manufacturing Corporation in Grand Rapids, Michigan.

A small, left-facing Indian-style swastika was painted on the inside of the original propeller spinner of the Spirit of St. Louis along with the names of all the Ryan Aircraft employees, including Dapper Dan, who designed and built it. It was meant as a message of good luck prior to Lindbergh's solo Atlantic crossing as the symbol was often used as a popular good luck charm with early aviators and others. (Note: During this period, the swastika (which has neolithic origins) was a widely used symbol of good luck and was not yet associated in the United States with the German Nazi Party which was still a largely unknown organization outside of Europe.) The inside of the original propeller spinner can be viewed at the National Air and Space Museum. This propeller spinner was found to be cracked when Lindbergh arrived at New York prior to his transatlantic flight. A replacement was hastily made in New York to replace the cracked original and was on the aircraft during the transatlantic flight.

== Later history and conservation ==
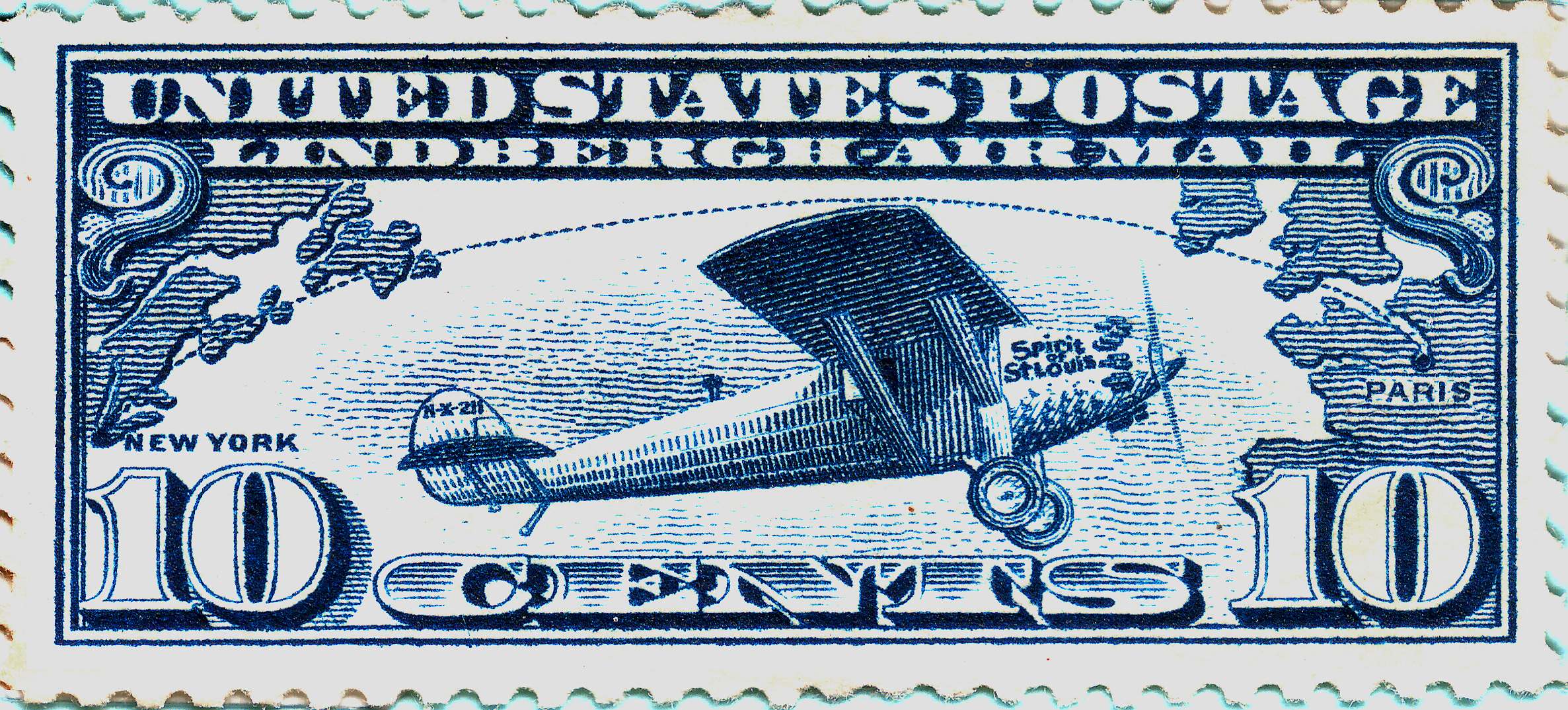
Ten-cent US Air Mail stamp honoring Capt. Charles Lindbergh and the Spirit of St Louis; issued June 11, 1927. (Scott C10)

Lindbergh's New York-to-Paris flight made him an instant celebrity and media star. In winning the Orteig Prize, Lindbergh stirred the public's imagination. He wrote: "I was astonished at the effect my successful landing in France had on the nations of the world. It was like a match lighting a bonfire." Lindbergh subsequently flew the Spirit of St. Louis to Belgium and England before President Calvin Coolidge sent the light cruiser Memphis to bring them back to the United States. Arriving on June 11, Lindbergh and the Spirit were escorted up the Potomac River to Washington, D.C., by a fleet of warships, multiple flights of military pursuit aircraft, bombers, and the rigid airship Los Angeles (which was itself a veteran of one of the earliest transatlantic flights), where President Coolidge presented the 25-year-old U.S. Army Reserve aviator with the Distinguished Flying Cross.

On the same day, the U.S Post Office issued a commemorative 10-cent "Lindbergh Air Mail" stamp depicting the Spirit over a map of its flight from New York to Paris, and which was also the first stamp issued by the post office that bore the name of a living person.

Over the next 10 months, Lindbergh flew the Spirit of St. Louis on promotional and goodwill tours across the United States and Latin America. According to the published log of the Spirit, during his 3-month tour of the US, he allowed Major Thomas Lamphier (Commander of the 1st Pursuit Squadron, Selfridge Field) and Lieutenant Philip R. Love (classmate in flight school and colleague of Lindbergh's in the airmail service of Robertson Aircraft Corporation) to pilot the Spirit of St. Louis for ten minutes each on July 1 and August 8, 1927, respectively. These two are apparently the only persons other than Lindbergh who ever piloted the Spirit of St. Louis.

One year and two days after making their first flight at Dutch Flats in San Diego, California, on April 28, 1927, Lindbergh and the Spirit of St. Louis flew together for the final time while making a hop from St. Louis to Bolling Field, in Washington, D.C., on April 30, 1928. There he presented the plane to the Smithsonian Institution where for more than eight decades it has been on display, hanging for 48 years (1928–76) in the Arts and Industries Building, and since 1976 hanging in the atrium of the National Air and Space Museum alongside the Bell X-1 and SpaceShipOne. At the time of its retirement, the Spirit had made 174 flights, totaling 489:28 hours in the air.

The Spirit of St. Louis appears today much as it appeared on its accession into the Smithsonian collection in 1928, except that the gold color of the aircraft's aluminum nose panels is an artifact of well-intended early conservation efforts: Not long after the museum took possession of the Spirit, conservators applied a clear layer of varnish or shellac to the forward panels in an attempt to preserve the flags and other artwork painted on the engine cowling. This protective coating has yellowed with age, resulting in the golden hue seen today. Smithsonian officials at some point planned to remove the varnish and restore the nose panels to their original silver appearance when the aircraft was to be taken down for conservation, but later decided that the golden hue on the engine cowling will remain, as it is part of the aircraft's natural state after acquisition and during its years on display. The effort to preserve artifacts is not to alter them but to maintain them as much as possible in the state in which the Smithsonian acquired them.

In 2015 the aircraft was lowered to the floor of the museum's Milestones gallery, and the tires were temporarily replaced with "forklift" style tires. This was done to preserve the Spirit's original tires which, due to age and lessening of vulcanization, are unable to sustain the aircraft's weight without disintegration (conservation was also likely undertaken on the wheel assembly itself).

== Further developed types ==
NYP-2, an exact duplicate of the Spirit of St. Louis, was built 45 days after the transatlantic flight, for the Japanese newspaper Mainichi. The NYP-2 carrying serial number 29 was registered as J-BACC and achieved a number of record-breaking flights early in 1928 before a crash ended its career.

Although Ryan capitalized on the notoriety of the NYP special, further developments were only superficially comparable to the Spirit of St. Louis. An offshoot of the Ryan B-1 Brougham emerged as a five-seater with the same J-5 engine but modified with a conventional cockpit layout and a shorter wingspan. Under the newly restructured B.F. Mahoney Company, further development continued with the six-place Model B-7 utilizing a 420 hp (310 kW) engine and the Model C-1 with the basic 220 hp (160 kW) engine.

Shortly after the original Spirit was retired in April 1928, the Mahoney Aircraft Corporation presented Lindbergh with a Mahoney Ryan B-1 "Brougham". In 1928, Mahoney built a B-1X (NX4215) as a gift for Charles Lindbergh.

Pilot Frank Hawks purchased a Mahoney Ryan B-1 Brougham (NC3009) with money from his wife, naming the plane the "Spirit of San Diego." In the aftermath of the media exposure surrounding Lindbergh's transatlantic flight, he flew to Washington with his wife on board to greet the triumphant Lindbergh. Due to the ensuing publicity, Hawks was hired by the Ryan Aircraft company to be its official representative. Hawks went on to tour the country, selling rides in the aircraft "like Lindy flew."

== Reproductions ==
=== Airworthy examples ===
The Mahoney Ryan B-1 "Brougham" was also used as the basis of a reproduction of the Spirit of St. Louis. The reproduction was used in the 1938 Paramount film Men with Wings starring Ray Milland.

All three reproductions from the Warner Bros. film The Spirit of St Louis (1957) have survived with B-153 on display at the Missouri History Museum, in St. Louis, B-156 is part of the collection at The Henry Ford museum in Dearborn, Michigan, and B-159 belongs to the Cradle of Aviation Museum located in Garden City, Long Island, New York, not far from the site of Roosevelt Field from which the original departed in 1927. According to information at the Henry Ford Museum, their copy (B-156) was actually owned by James Stewart, who portrayed Lindbergh in the film. Stewart is credited as having donated the aircraft to the museum. Lindbergh was reputed to have flown one of the reproductions during the film's production, however, the connection to Lindbergh is now considered a myth.

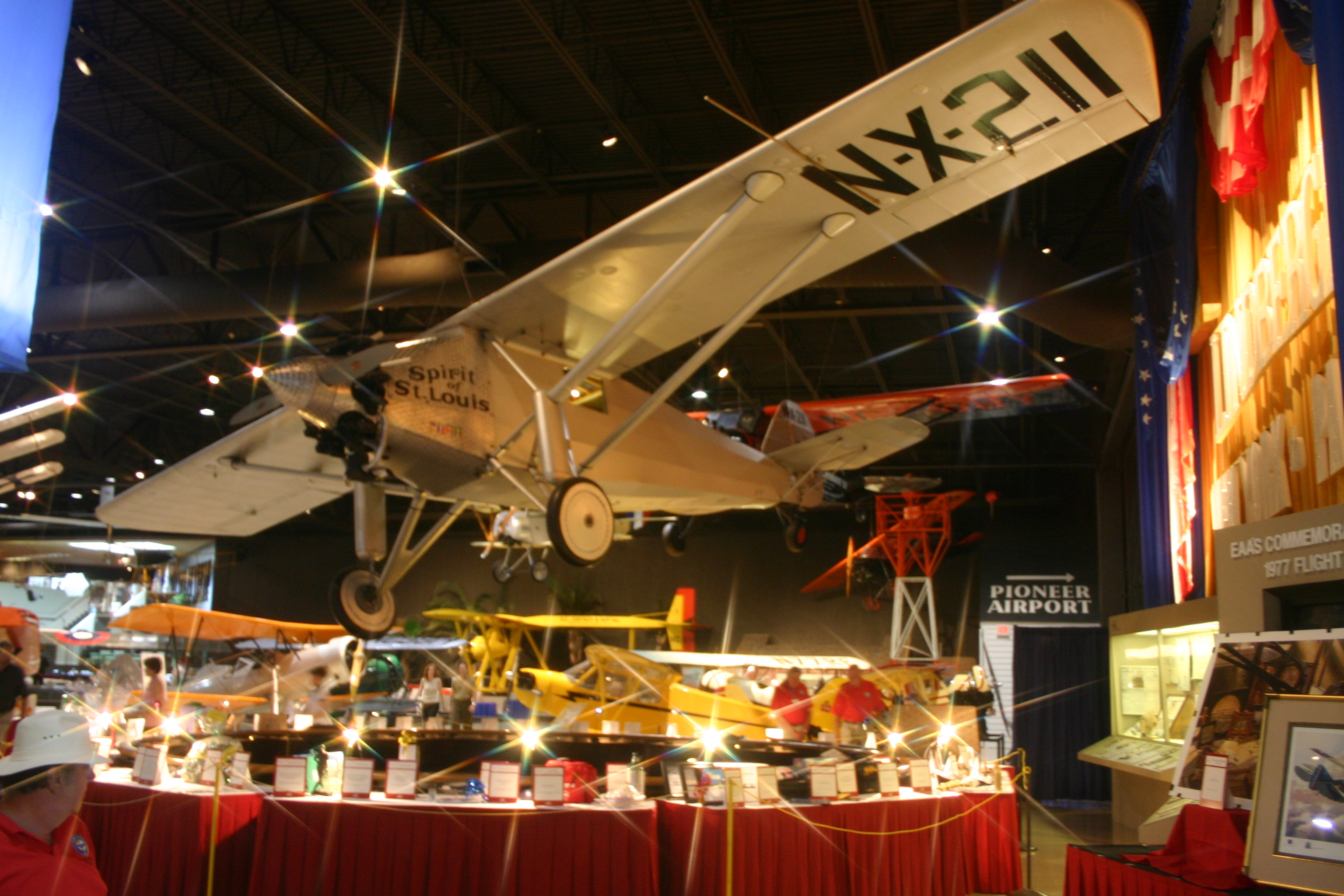
Spirit of St. Louis replica at the EAA Aviation Museum

On the 40th anniversary of Lindbergh's flight, a new reproduction named Spirit 2 was built by a movie stunt pilot, Frank Tallman. It first flew on April 24, 1967, and appeared at the 1967 Paris Air Show where it made several flights over Paris. In 1972, Spirit 2 was bought for $50,000 by the San Diego Air & Space Museum (formerly San Diego Aerospace Museum) and placed on public display until it was destroyed by arson in 1978. The museum built a replacement named Spirit 3 which first flew on April 28, 1979; it made seven flights before being placed on display. In August 2003, the Spirit 3 was removed from display and was flown as a 75th Anniversary tribute to Lindbergh. The aircraft is now on display in the museum's rotunda.

Through the efforts of both staff and volunteers, the Experimental Aircraft Association in Oshkosh, Wisconsin produced two reproductions of the Spirit of St. Louis, powered by Continental R-670-4 radial engines, the first in 1977 (of which was to be based on a conversion from a B-1 Brougham; the aircraft proved to be too badly deteriorated to be used in that manner), flown by EAA founder Paul Poberezny to commemorate the 50th anniversary of Lindbergh's flight across the Atlantic Ocean and subsequent tour of the United States. This example is now on display in the main museum gallery. A second reproduction, started from scratch in 1977 and first flown in November 1990, continues to fly at air shows and commemorative events. Both of the EAA reproductions were registered under the original's N-X-211.

Another airworthy reproduction was built by David Cannavo and first flown in 1979, powered by a Lycoming R-680 engine. In 1995, it was bought by Kermit Weeks for his Fantasy of Flight Museum in Polk City, Florida.

A reproduction of the Spirit (Registration ES-XCL), which had been built and certified in Estonia in 1997, was written off on May 31, 2003. Shortly after takeoff at an air show in Coventry, England, structural failure occurred, resulting in a fatal crash, killing its owner-pilot, Captain Pierre Holländer. (Note: Even though the airframe only had 191 total hours, the accident investigation revealed the cause of the crash to be a metal fatigue failure of the starboard wing's "wishbone" strut resulting from a faulty weld. Captain Pierre Holländer was a veteran (22,000+ hours) Swedish Saab 340 pilot.)

A recently completed Spirit reproduction, intended for airworthiness is owned by the Old Rhinebeck Aerodrome (ORA), fulfilling a lifelong dream of its primary founder, Cole Palen (1925–1993). The reproduction project had been started by Cole before his own death and has mostly been subsequently built by former ORA pilot and current vintage aircraft maintenance manager Ken Cassens, receiving its wing covering, completed with doped fabric in 2015. A restored Wright J-5 Whirlwind radial was obtained by Palen in the 1970s for the project's start, with original, and still-functional 1920s-era flight instruments being incorporated — including the same basic type of earth inductor compass used by Lindbergh — matching the ones in the original Spirit at the NASM.

This reproduction aircraft successfully flew in early December 2015 in upstate New York, piloted by aircraft restorer/builder Ken Cassens of Stone Ridge, New York. The aircraft made its public debut flight on May 21, 2016, the 89th anniversary of Lindbergh's flight.

JNE Aircraft's reproduction

Over a period of 7 years and 3 months, John Norman of Burlington, Washington crafted to-date the most authentic Spirit reproduction ever built. With the intention of creating a copy of the aircraft "as it sits now," with all the patches, updates or modifications recreated in pains-taking detail and the added bonus of being airworthy, Norman completed the project in 2019. The maiden flight was performed July 28, 2019 and the public debut flight was September 8, piloted by John's friend and seasoned pilot, Ron Fowler.

In 2015, with coordinated efforts by fellow Spirit researcher Ty Sundstrom and the National Air & Space Museum, Norman took detailed measurements to correct errors he had discovered in the existing "Morrow" drawings. During the same trip, in an attempted search for Lindbergh's missing logbook, Norman used a video boroscope to inspect never-before seen areas of the fuselage and discovered an original pair of pliers thought to have been used by Lindbergh to adjust the fuel valves during flight.

In late 2021, a documentary feature film centered on the project and its builder began production. As of 2022, a tentative summer 2023 release was expected.

=== Static display examples ===
A 90% static reproduction, built in 1956 for The Spirit of St Louis film by studio employees, is now on display at the Wings of the North Air Museum in Eden Prairie, MN. In 1999, the San Diego Air & Space Museum built a non-flying example that was fitted with an original Wright J-5 engine. It is on display at San Diego International Airport. A static reproduction of the Spirit of St. Louis was built in 2002 and is on display at St. Louis Lambert International Airport. The Octave Chanute Aerospace Museum at Rantoul, Illinois also has a static reproduction built by museum volunteers. Two reproductions are also found in Germany, one at the Frankfurt International Airport with the second in the "Luftfahrtmuseum Hannover". (Note: Not truly a reproduction, but the cut-away flight simulator at the History Center of the Charles A. Lindbergh Historic Site in Little Falls, Minnesota provides visitors with a computer-assisted experience of sitting in and flying the Spirit of St. Louis.)

== Specifications (Ryan NYP) ==

Data from (Note: Schiff's article gives history of the Spirit and Lindbergh's transatlantic flight, technical details of the aircraft, and a pilot's narrative of flying a replica.)

General characteristics

- Crew: 1
- Length: 27 ft 7 in (8.41 m)
- Wingspan: 46 ft (14 m)
- Height: 9 ft 10 in (3.00 m)
- Wing area: 320 sq ft (30 m^{2})
- Airfoil: Clark Y
- Empty weight: 2,150 lb (975 kg)
- Gross weight: 2,888 lb (1,310 kg)
- Max takeoff weight: 5,135 lb (2,329 kg)
- Fuel capacity: 450 US gal (375 imp gal; 1,703 L)
- Powerplant: 1 × Wright J-5C Whirlwind 9-cylinder air-cooled radial piston engine, 223 hp (166 kW)
- Propellers: 2-bladed Standard Steel fixed pitch metal propeller

Performance

- Maximum speed: 133 mph (214 km/h, 116 kn)
- Cruise speed: 100–110 mph (160–180 km/h, 87–96 kn)
- Range: 4,100 mi (6,600 km, 3,600 nmi)
- Service ceiling: 16,400 ft (5,000 m)
- Wing loading: 16 lb/sq ft (78 kg/m^{2})
- Power/mass: 0.0435 hp/lb (0.0715 kW/kg)

== See also ==
- Charles Lindbergh in popular culture
- Transatlantic flight of Alcock and Brown

Related development

- Ryan M-2

Aircraft of comparable role, configuration, and era

- Bremen
- Plus Ultra
- Bird of Paradise
- Miss Veedol
- Wright-Bellanca WB-2

== Sources ==
- Bak, Richard. The Big Jump: Lindbergh and the Great Atlantic Air Race. Hoboken, New York: John Wiley & Sons, 2011. ISBN 978-0-471-47752-5.
- Belfiore, Michael. Rocketeers: How a Visionary Band of Business Leaders, Engineers, and Pilots is Boldly Privatizing Space. Archived May 15, 2015, at the Wayback Machine Washington, D.C.: Smithsonian, 2007. ISBN 978-0-06-114903-0.
- Bowers, Peter M. "The Many Splendid Spirits of St. Louis." Air Progress, Volume 20, No. 6, June 1967.
- Cassagneres, Ev. The Untold Story of the Spirit of St. Louis: From the Drawing Board to the Smithsonian. New Brighton, Minnesota: Flying Book International, 2002. ISBN 0-911139-32-X.
- Daniels, C.M. "Speed: The Story of Frank Hawks." Air Classics, Vol. 6, No. 2, December 1969.
- Forden, Lesley. The Ford Air Tours: 1925–1931. Alameda, California: Nottingham Press, 1973. ISBN 978-0-9725249-1-9.
- Gill. Brendan. Lindbergh Alone. New York: Harcourt, 1980. ISBN 978-0-1515-2401-3.
- Hall, Donald A. Technical Preparation of the Airplane "Spirit of St. Louis" N.A.C.A. Technical Note #257 Archived April 11, 2007, at the Wayback Machine Washington, DC: National Advisory Committee for Aeronautics, July 1927. Retrieved: May 18, 2007.
- Hall, Nova S. Spirit and Creator: The Mysterious Man Behind Lindbergh's Flight to Paris. Sheffield, Maryland: ATN Publishing, 2002. ISBN 0-9702964-4-4.
- Hardwick, Jack and Ed Schnepf. "A Viewer's Guide to Aviation Movies." The Making of the Great Aviation Films. General Aviation Series, Volume 2, 1989.
- Jackson, Joe. Atlantic Fever: Lindbergh, His Competitors, and the Race to Cross the Atlantic. New York: Farrar, Straus and Giroux, 2012. ISBN 978-0-37410-675-1.
- Lindbergh, Charles A. Spirit of St. Louis. New York: Scribners, 1953.
- Nevin, David, ed. The Pathfinders (The Epic of Flight, v. 2). Alexandria, Virginia: Time-Life Books, 1980. ISBN 0-8094-3256-0.
- Simpson, Rod. "Preserving the Spirit". Air-Britain Aviation World, Volume 55, no. 4, 2003. ISSN 0950-7434.
- Wohl, Robert. The Spectacle of Flight: Aviation and the Western Imagination, 1920–1950. New Haven, Connecticut: Yale University Press, 2005. ISBN 0-300-10692-0.
