= The Spirit of St. Louis (book) =

1953 autobiographical book by Charles Lindbergh

- Book cover of the first edition, 1953
- Author: Charles A. Lindbergh
- Cover artist: George W. Thompson
- Language: English
- Genre: Autobiography
- Publisher: Charles Scribner's Sons
- Publication date: September 14, 1953
- Publication place: United States
- Pages: 562
- ISBN: 0-684-85277-2

The Spirit of St. Louis is an autobiographical account by Charles Lindbergh about the events leading up to and including his 1927 solo trans-Atlantic flight in the Spirit of St. Louis, a custom-built, single engine, single-seat monoplane (Registration: N-X-211). The book was published on September 14, 1953, and won the Pulitzer Prize in 1954.

== Summary ==
The book covers a period of time between September 1926 and May 1927, and is divided into two sections: The Craft and New York to Paris. In the first section, The Craft (pp. 3–178), Lindbergh describes the latter days of his career as an airmail pilot and presents his account of conceiving, planning, and executing the building of the Spirit of St. Louis aircraft. He describes the many challenges he faced, including getting financial backing, constructing an aircraft that could carry the necessary fuel and still fly, and completing the project within several months—other pilots were racing to achieve the first solo trans-Atlantic flight and win the $25,000 Orteig Prize.

In the second section, New York to Paris (pp. 181–492), Lindbergh gives a detailed hour-by-hour account of his 33-hour solo flight above the Atlantic and northern Europe that began in the early morning hours of May 21, 1927. He describes the numerous challenges presented by navigation, storms, fuel calculation, boredom, and lack of sleep during the course of the flight that would take him over 3,600 miles from Roosevelt Field in Long Island, New York to Le Bourget field in Paris. Throughout the narrative, Lindbergh interjects flashback memories of his childhood in Little Falls, Minnesota, his college years, his early years as an aviator barnstorming across the countryside, his aviation mentors and friends who flew the mail routes with him, and his family—especially his father, who was not only a congressman, but a respected and sage companion to his young son.

As Lindbergh flies through the long, solitary night toward Europe, forcing his sleep-obsessed mind to check and re-check his course, he recalls the night he was flying the mail from St. Louis to Chicago when he first thought of flying across the Atlantic Ocean. Lindbergh believed he could make that flight, and he remembers his nine St. Louis friends who helped him purchase the Spirit of St. Louis and realize his dream. In the 22nd hour of flight Lindberg describes seeing and hearing visions of people in the cockpit, and remembers fond memories of his father. Lindbergh describes the thrill of spotting the first fishing boats off the coast of Ireland, and then crossing the coast of France, and then following the Seine River all the way to Paris and Le Bourget field.

In addition to an Afterword (pp. 495–501), Lindbergh included an extensive Appendix (pp. 503–562) containing his flight log, a flight map, his journal account of his return to the United States aboard the cruiser USS Memphis, an article about the decorations, awards, and trophies he received, engineering data and engine specifications, 16 pages of photographs, various illustrations, and a glossary.

== Background information ==
The Spirit of St. Louis was the third book length account Lindbergh wrote of his solo trans-Atlantic flight. The first was called "WE" which was published by G. P. Putnam's Sons in July, 1927 less than two months after the flight. He wrote a more expansive account in a book titled Of Flight and Life, which covered his entire aviation history. Lindbergh was pleased with the way Charles Scribner's Sons handled the publication of the latter, and he chose them to publish The Spirit of St. Louis. He asked for and received a $25,000 advance and 15 percent royalty from the first copy sold. He arranged for all proceeds to go directly into a trust for his children.

Lindbergh's editor, John Hall Wheelock, responded enthusiastically to the first manuscripts he read, writing to Lindbergh how impressed he was "not only by the way you have unfolded your story, but by the extraordinary beauty of the descriptions of sea and air." When Lindbergh asked Wheelock for more severe criticism, the editor responded with several suggestions that trimmed the book by about 70 pages—mainly flashbacks to his early life, which the editor felt distracted from the main narrative.

Lindbergh hired a literary agent, George T. Bye, who negotiated a serialization deal and motion-picture rights for $100,000 from The Saturday Evening Post. Ten installments appeared in that periodical under the title, "33 Hours to Paris". These installments generated the largest sales in the magazine's history. The Book of the Month Club selected The Spirit of St. Louis as the main selection in September 1953.

According to the author's Preface (pp. ix–xii), Lindbergh worked on the manuscript of The Spirit of St. Louis for 14 years. Work began in 1938, 11 years after the last event described in the book, so Lindbergh needed to rely on memory for his early drafts; few detailed records were available to him. The author cites his belief in the future of aviation as his primary motive for the flight, and tried to capture that in his book.

Prior to the publication of The Spirit of St. Louis on September 14, 1953, Lindbergh presented an advance copy in August 1953 to Carl B. Allen, who had read the manuscript and provided criticism and suggestions (he is included in the Acknowledgements). Accompanying the inscribed book was a two-page typewritten letter signed by Lindbergh that provides information about some of the challenges the author faced in the writing of the book.

I feel sure that some errors will be found, but want to exhaust every reasonable method of eliminating them before publication. In regard to the take-off area at North Island (San Diego), I have no figures. There was plenty of margin in this instance as the plane was carrying only a little over a half load of fuel. I wrote the first draft of the manuscript in past tense, then changed to present. Personally, I think it made a great improvement in spite of certain obvious restrictions. In regard to the difference between We and The Spirit of St. Louis, as you probably know I wrote We in three weeks (with the exception of about 5000 words which I had pieced together previously); also, one learns, or at least should learn during a quarter century of life. I have worked with more or less regularity for fourteen years on this present manuscript—quite intensively this winter. Also, as I am sure you realize more than most, being married to Anne has affected this book, in a deeper sense, as much as though she had written large parts of it.

In the months leading up to its publication, Lindbergh and his wife Anne labored over the galley proofs, leaving no detail unnoticed. Charles Scribner would later recall, "He would measure the difference between a semicolon and a colon to make sure each as what it ought to be. To him, every detail in the book has as much significance as if it were a moving part in the airplane."

Just prior to publication, Lindbergh dedicated the book to his wife, "To A.M.L. Who will never realize how much of this book she has written". A dark blue dustjacket was prepared by George W. Thompson of a night sky filled with stars. The book's endpapers were reproduced from an original aquatint by Burnell Poole titled, "The Epic of the Air".

== Reception ==
The Spirit of St. Louis was an overwhelming bestseller and generated near universal praise and favorable reviews. The Book of the Month Club alone sold over 100,000 copies in the first year, with several hundred thousand additional copies sold in bookstores and elsewhere. The Chicago Daily News called it a "stunning, tremendously beautiful reading experience ... a classic of adventure writing." Time noted, "At its exciting best, this book keeps the reader cockpit close to a rare adventure." And Lindbergh biographer Brendan Gill concluded, "The best authority on Lindbergh is Lindbergh."

In his book review that appeared in The New York Times on September 13, 1953, Quentin Reynolds wrote:

At last we have a book that explains and humanizes Lindbergh; that brings him into the company of his fellow mortals. The book is The Spirit of St. Louis, and it is of course written by the one man who really knows Lindbergh—himself. He spent fourteen years in the writing of it; the years were well spent.

Were this merely a personal account of his almost miraculous flight it would have interest, but not much significance. But this is far more than that; this is a frank and fascinating autobiography that destroys the myth of the phlegmatic, nerveless airman impervious to doubt and to the uncertainties that plague lesser mortals. Lindbergh had his moments of doubt and fear, when fourteen hours out of Roosevelt Field ice appeared on the wings of his plane and when black thunderheads loomed ahead. "They are barbaric in their methods. They lash you with their hailstones, poison you with freezing mist." No, Lindbergh during that flight was not merely a robot-like figure at the stick, he was not the supremely confident master of his plane and of his destiny. Was he on the right course? 'Am I heading for Africa instead of Europe?' he asked himself in desperate anxiety.

His book is written in the present tense, a happy choice, for somehow this style sustains the tension of the flight and enables the reader to feel himself a stowaway aboard the plane, sharing the dangers, the uncertainties and the eventual triumph. It takes quite a bit of literary skill to sustain the first person singular, present indicative, throughout five hundred pages, but take the word of this awed and amazed reader, Lindbergh writes as well as he flies, and the interest and suspense never lessen."

== Later editions ==
The 1956 edition

The Spirit of St. Louis continued to be reprinted in a number of editions with a variety of different covers with the copyright being renewed in 1981 by Anne Morrow Lindbergh. Later reprints beginning with the 1993 edition for the Minnesota Historical Society Press, featured an introduction written by Reeve Lindbergh. The latest hardcover and paperback editions are published by Scribner, the modern counterpart of the original, Charles Scribner's Sons. Scribner's 1956 edition bore the iconic 1927 portrait photograph of Lindbergh as a US Air Mail pilot.

There is no commercial audiobook version; however, the Canadian National Institute for the Blind produced a version in the 1980s narrated by Gordon Gould, and the American National Library Service for the Blind and Physically Handicapped produced a version narrated by Bruce Huntey.

== Adaptations ==
Lindbergh's literary agent, George T. Bye, sold the film rights to Warner Bros. for more than a million dollars. The film version of the book was released in 1957, directed by Billy Wilder, and starring James Stewart as Charles Lindbergh.

== Legacy ==
A copy of the book flew in space on the first competitive Ansari X Prize flight in 2004, SpaceShipOne flight 16P. The X Prize was inspired by the Orteig Prize that Lindbergh won for his flight.
