= Ryan M-1 =

Mail plne produced by Ryan Aeronautical

M-1 and M-2
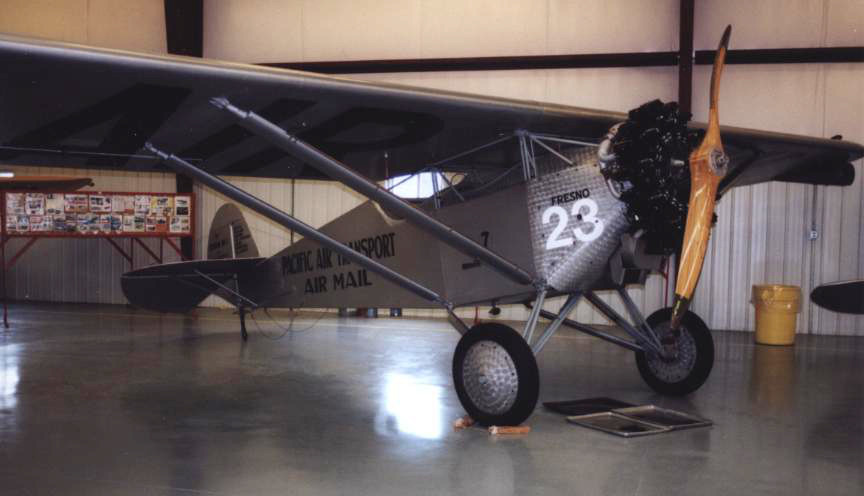
- Original Ryan M-1 NC2073 in Pacific Air Transport markings in the Historic Aircraft Restoration Museum, Creve Coeur airport, Missouri.

General information
- Type: Mailplane
- National origin: United States
- Manufacturer: Ryan
- Designer: Hawley Bowlus, W A Mankey, John Northrop
- Status: two airworthy in 2009
- Number built: 36

History
- First flight: 14 February 1926

The Ryan M-1 was a mail plane produced in the United States in the 1920s. It was the first original design built by Ryan Aeronautical. It was a conventional gear parasol-wing monoplane with two open cockpits in tandem and fixed, tailskid undercarriage.

== Design and development ==
The follow-on M-2 was substantially the same as the M-1. The prototype M-1 was originally powered by a Hispano-Suiza 8A, but production examples featured a variety of engines in the same general power range, with the Wright J-4B chosen for nine of the sixteen M-1s built, and the prototype later refitted with this engine.

According to Cassagneres, "Dimensions allowed for a front cockpit that could accommodate two passengers side by side, or one passenger and a sack of mail, or just mail sacks and no passenger. Dual controls were provided, so a passenger flying up front could get in some 'stick time' if he wished. The M-1 cowling had a feature that was to become almost a trademark on all subsequent Ryan models up to the ST. This was the distinctive 'engine-turning' or 'jeweling' effect achieved by burnishing the aluminum.

== Operational history ==
An M-1 was flown in the 1926 Ford National Reliability Air Tour.

Pacific Air Transport operated J-4B-powered M-1s and M-2s on their demanding Seattle–San Francisco–Los Angeles mail route, while Hispano-Suiza-powered machines flew with Colorado Airways between Cheyenne and Pueblo and Yukon Airways between Whitehorse and Dawson City.

One M-2 (named Bluebird) was built with a fully enclosed cabin for the pilot and four passengers, foreshadowing Ryan's highly successful Brougham series. The standard M-2, meanwhile, was Charles Lindbergh's first choice for his transatlantic flight. His list of requirements for the aircraft soon made it apparent, however, that rather than modifying an M-2, it would be more effective to build an all-new design along the same general lines, which resulted in the Ryan NYP Spirit of St Louis.

== Operators ==
United States

- Pacific Air Transport

== Aircraft on display ==
The M-1 prototype was restored to flying condition between 1980 and 1984 and is preserved in the Museum of Flight in Seattle. The seventh aircraft is preserved in airworthy condition in Pacific Air Transport markings at the Historic Aircraft Restoration Museum at Creve Coeur airport, Missouri. A replica of an M-1 using a small number of parts from serial number 11 was built by Andy King in 2001, powered by a Lycoming R-680 and also painted in Pacific Air Transport #7's scheme. Serial number 11 is owned and faces a full restoration by John Norman, who crafted the most accurate reproduction of the Spirit of St. Louis ever built. A replica M-1 is exhibited in the San Diego Air & Space Museum.

== Specifications (M-1) ==
Data from "Ryan M-1"

General characteristics

- Crew: One pilot
- Capacity: 1-2 passengers
- Length: 24 ft 0 in (7.30 m)
- Wingspan: 36 ft 0 in (11.00 m)
- Wing area: 228 sq ft (21 m^{2})
- Empty weight: 1,550 lb (705 kg)
- Gross weight: 2,700 lb (1,230 kg)
- Powerplant: 1 × Hispano-Suiza 8A , 150 hp (110 kW)

Performance

- Maximum speed: 125 mph (200 km/h, 109 kn)
- Range: 400 mi (640 km, 350 nmi)
