= Ryan Foursome =

American aircraft

C-1 Foursome
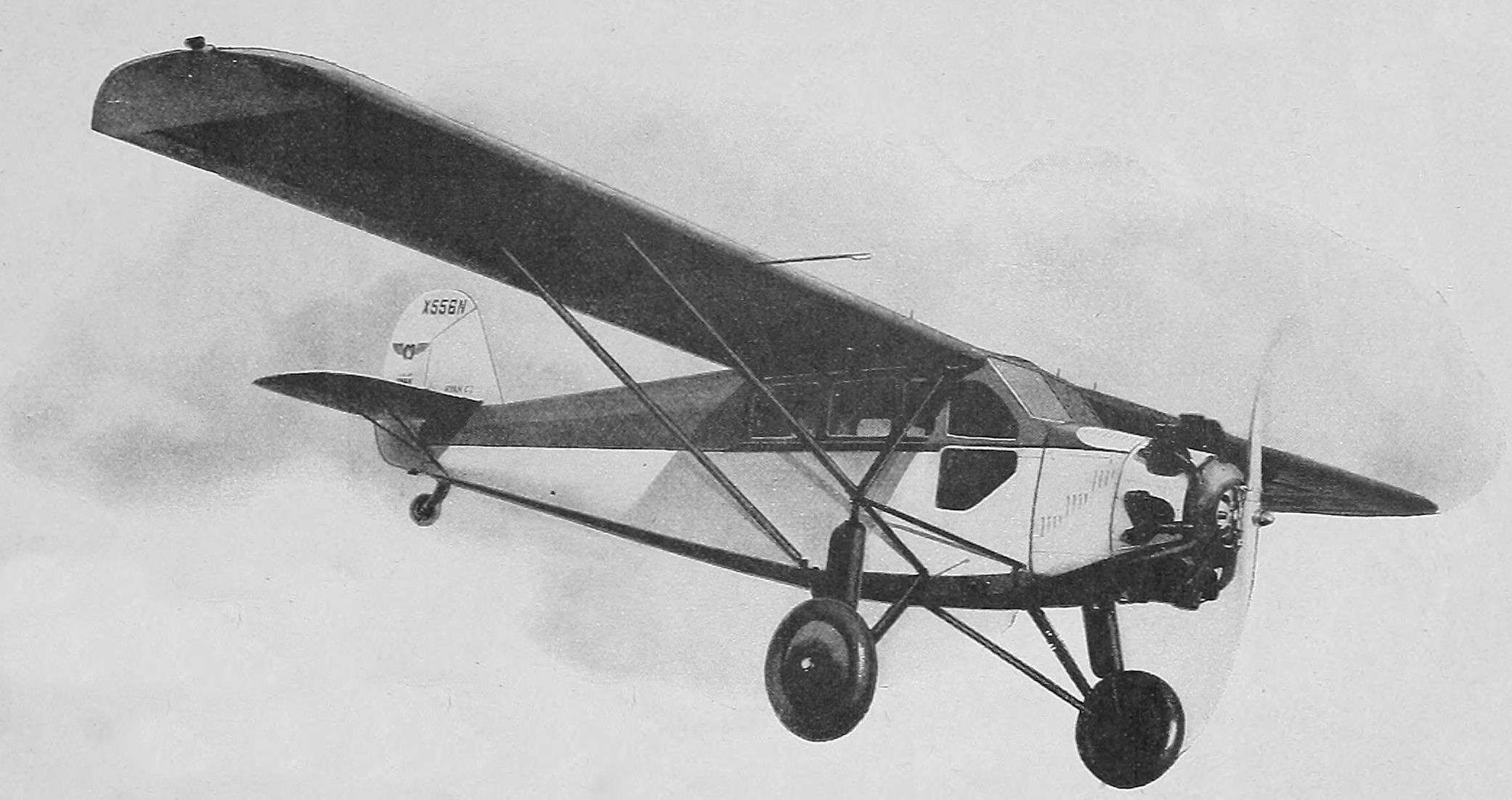
- C-1

General information
- Type: Business aircraft
- National origin: United States
- Manufacturer: Ryan Aeronautical
- Number built: 3

History
- First flight: 1930

The Ryan C-1 Foursome, also known as the "Baby Brougham", was a single-engine, four-seat light aircraft built by Ryan Aeronautical in the United States in 1930 as an executive transport. It was a high-wing, braced monoplane based on Ryan's highly successful Brougham design, but substantially smaller. The interior was luxuriously furnished, with deeply upholstered seats, and an oversize cabin door was fitted to ease boarding and disembarking for the three passengers.

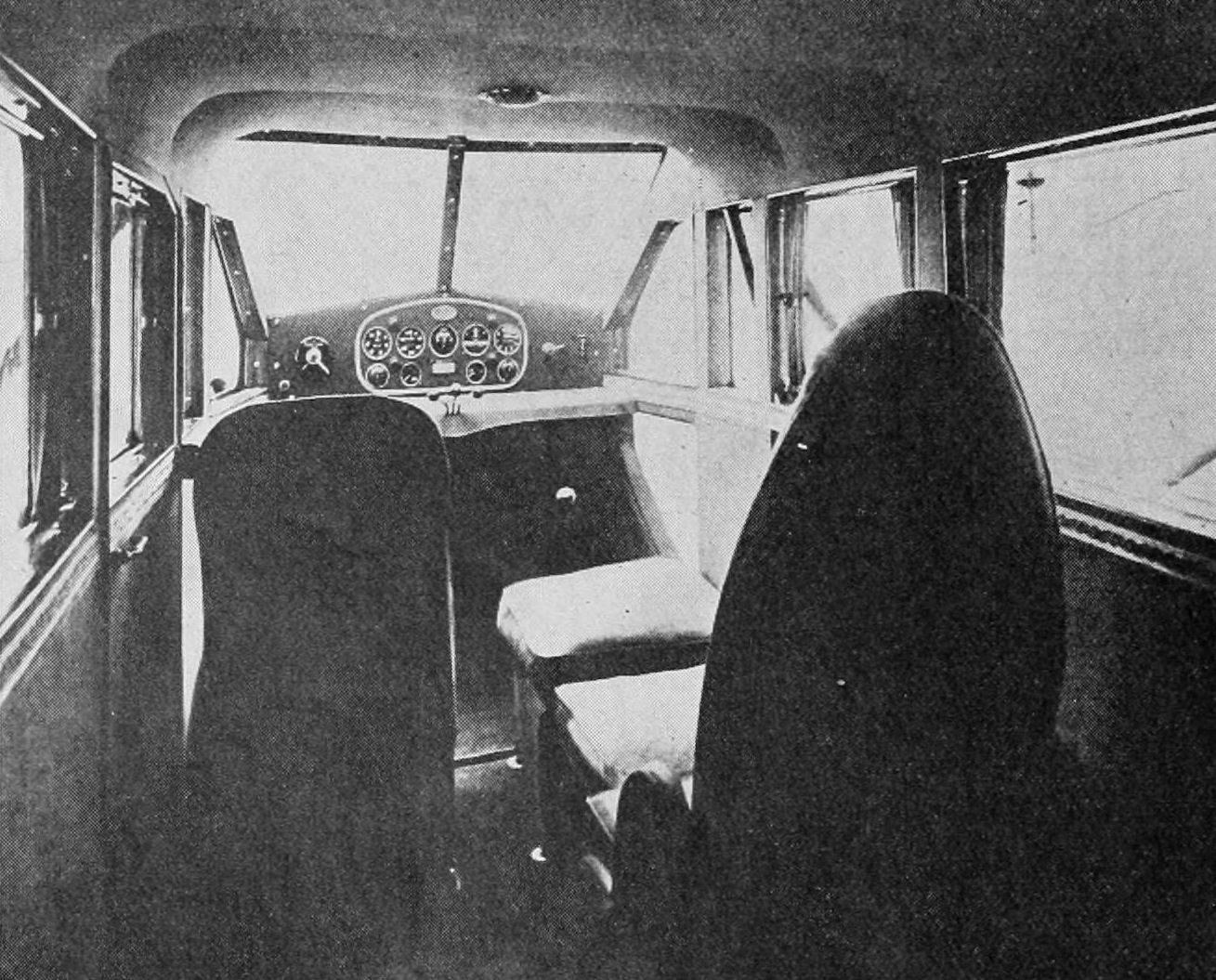
Ryan C-1 Foursome interior photo from Aero Digest March,1930

Only three examples were built before deteriorating economic conditions led to the sale of the Ryan factory in October 1930. One of the three machines was fitted with a Packard DR-980 diesel engine and designated the C-2. This latter aircraft was lost during an attempted transatlantic crossing by Alex Loeb and Richard Decker in August 1939.

== Variants ==
- C-1 - original version with Wright R-760 engine (2 built)
- C-2 - diesel-powered version with Packard DR-980 engine (1 built)

== Specifications (C-1) ==
Data from "Ryan, Ryan-Douglas, Ryan-Flamingo, Ryan-Standard"

General characteristics

- Crew: One pilot
- Capacity: 3 passengers
- Length: 27 ft 7 in (8.41 m)
- Wingspan: 39 ft 3 in (11.96 m)
- Powerplant: 1 × Wright R-760 , 225 hp (168 kW)

Performance

- Maximum speed: 128 mph (205 km/h, 111 kn)
- Range: 600 mi (960 km, 520 nmi)
