= Dapper Dan =

Dapper Dan may refer to:

== People ==
- Daniel B. Burnett Jr. (1905–1976), wing designer of the Spirit of St. Louis plane flown by Charles Lindbergh
- Frank Daley (1908–1968), Canadian hockey player
- Dan Howley (1885–1944), American baseball player
- Dapper Dan (designer) (born 1944), African-American fashion designer and haberdasher Daniel Day

== Arts and entertainment ==
- Dapper Dan The Magnetic Man, a 1950s era toy
- "Dapper Dan", a song by Ski Mask the Slump God on his 2018 mixtape Beware the Book of Eli
- "Dapper Dan" Greco, a character in the 1947 Bowery Boys film News Hounds
- "Dapper Dan" fictional hair pomade, featured prominently in the 2000 Coen Brothers' film O Brother, Where Art Thou?

== Sports ==
- Dapper Dan (horse), an American racehorse of the 1960s
- Dapper Dan Open, a former PGA Tour professional golf tournament
- Dapper Dan Charities, Pittsburgh's oldest (since 1936) and largest sports charity

== See also ==
- The Dapper Dans, a barbershop quartet that performs at various Disney theme parks
- "Dapper" Danny Hogan (1880–1928), American gangster
