= Donald A. Hall =

American aerospace engineer

- Young Donald A. Hall in 1927 when designing the Spirit of St. Louis
- Born: 7 December 1898; Brooklyn, New York City, U.S.
- Died: 2 May 1968 (aged 69); San Diego, California, U.S.
- Education: Pratt Institute
- Occupation: American aerospace engineer
- Children: 1

Donald Albert Hall (December 7, 1898 – May 2, 1968) was an American pioneering aeronautical engineer and aircraft designer who is most famous for having designed the Spirit of St. Louis.

Hall was also part of the three-person team that discovered that the crack of a bullwhip is a sonic boom.

== Early years ==
Hall was born in Brooklyn, New York City, on December 7, 1898. He attended the Manual Training High School in Brooklyn, and graduated from the Pratt Institute with a certificate in Industrial Mechanical Engineering in 1917.

== Aviation career ==
From 1919 to 1921, Donald Hall worked for the Curtiss Aeroplane and Motor Company as a junior draftsman, checker, and then designer. From 1921 to 1922, he was the aerodynamic design and acting chief engineer at Elias & Brothers. He moved to Santa Monica, California in 1924 to work for Douglas Aircraft.

He left Douglas Aircraft in 1926, briefly worked for the airplane division of the Ford Motor Company, and then became an aviation cadet in the U.S. Army Air Corps, but did not become a military pilot. He then returned to Douglas Aircraft, and joined Ryan Airlines in San Diego on 31 January 1927 as a full-time chief engineer and parts inspector, three weeks before Charles A. Lindbergh visited the company to inquire about designing the Spirit of St. Louis.

== The Spirit of St. Louis ==
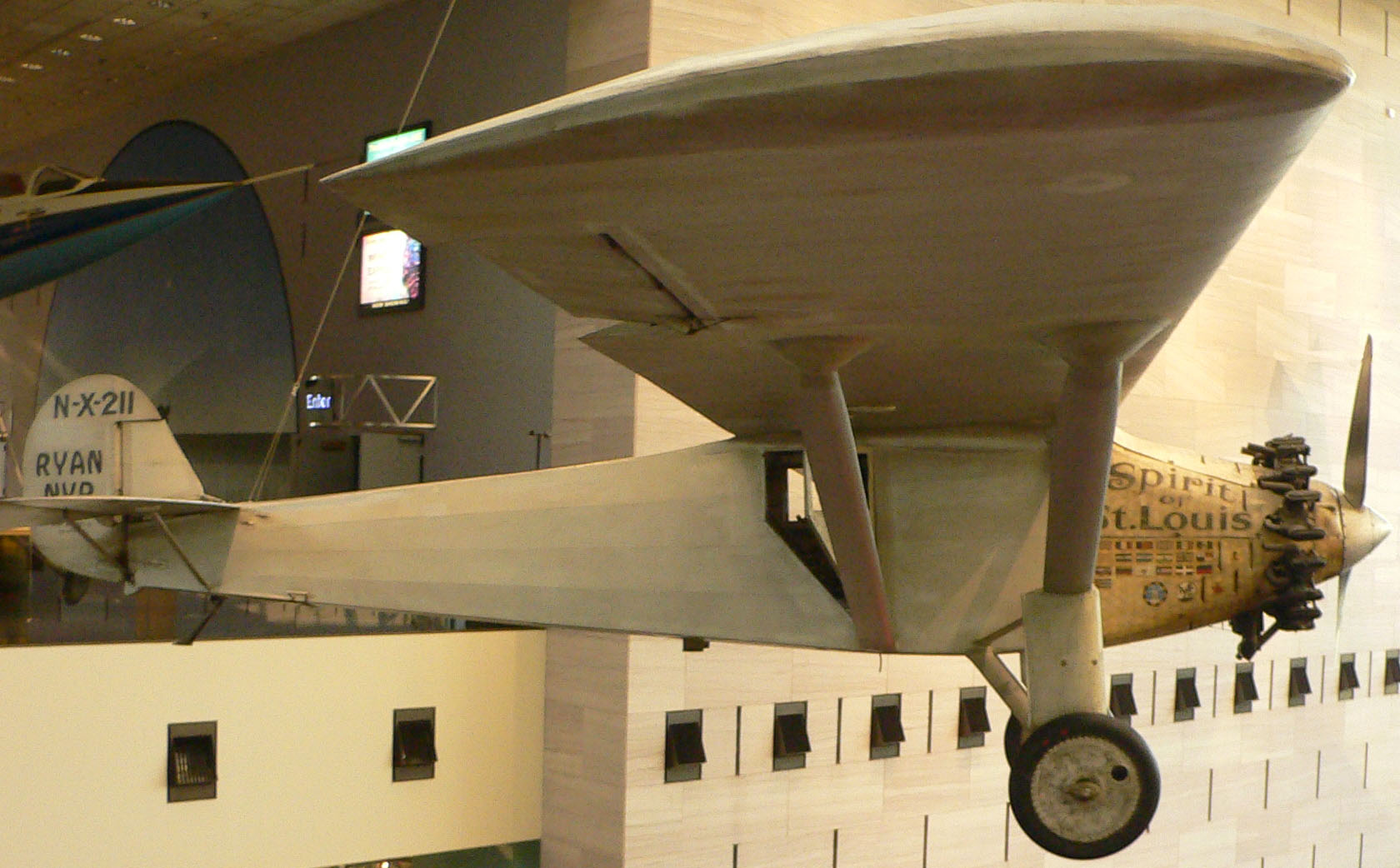
Spirit of St. Louis hanging in the National Air and Space Museum

Only days later, Ryan Airlines received an inquiry from Robertson Aircraft Corp. of St. Louis asking if they could design and build an aircraft capable of flying nonstop from New York to Paris. Ryan Airlines responded in the affirmative and after all the other potential manufacturers had said no, Charles Lindbergh finally traveled to San Diego on 21 February 1927 to inspect the Ryan Airlines facility. There he met Donald Hall for the first time. After touring the facility with the new owner Benjamin Franklin Mahoney, Lindbergh met and discussed the project with Donald A. Hall in his second story office. Lindbergh wanted to decide if the company could really deliver on the proposed aircraft.

Lindbergh later stated in his Pulitzer Prize winning 1953 book, The Spirit of St. Louis, that he chose Ryan Airlines in part because he believed in Hall's ability. The two men began working closely to design and construct the aircraft in only sixty days, from 28 February 1927 to 28 April 1927 when the first flight tests started.

Upon the request of Charles Lindbergh, Donald Hall intentionally left the aircraft slightly unstable to help keep its aviator awake.

The final aircraft was known as the Ryan NYP (registration number N-X-211) which captured popular imagination as the Spirit of St. Louis in May 1927 by flying nonstop from New York City to Paris and winning Charles Lindbergh the Orteig Prize. The famous flight made Lindbergh an instant worldwide celebrity and aviation became much more popular around the globe because of it.

Hall left Ryan Airlines in 1929 after the company became Mahoney-Ryan Airlines and later relocated to St. Louis.

== Later career ==
From 1929 to 1936, he developed Hall Aeronautical Research and Development Company, and designed and built the Hall X-1. This was a tandem wing design for which Hall held the patent. He closed this company due to financial problems, and joined Consolidated Vultee Aircraft/Convair as an aerodynamics and pre-design engineer. He was involved in the design of the B-24 Liberator bomber. He was discharged by Consolidated (then known as Convair) during the defense cutbacks following World War Two.

In 1952, he became head of the Navy's helicopter division at North Island, San Diego. He worked there in research until 1963.

=== Bullwhip breaking the sound barrier ===
In 1958, he was part of a team, along with Barry Bernstein and Horace M. Trent, that made the discovery of what causes a bullwhip's crack. At the time, it was thought to be caused by leather in the tip smacking against other leather as it curled back in on itself. Bernstein, Trent, and Hall proved that it was really the whip exceeding the sound barrier.

== Death ==
Donald Hall died of a heart attack on 2 May 1968 and was survived by his wife and only son. The New York Times and other major newspapers wrote extended obituaries for him once his death was publicly announced.

Years later, his grandson Nova Hall found a trunk in his garage that belonged to his grandfather Donald Hall, and which contained all the documents that were used to design the Spirit of St. Louis.

== Other tenures ==
- 1937-1968: Associate Fellow at the American Institute of Aeronautics and Astronautics (AIAA)

== In popular culture ==
Arthur Space played Hall in the 1957 film The Spirit of St. Louis.

== Publications ==
- Technical Preparation of the Spirit of St. Louis - Technical Note #257, National Advisory Committee for Aeronautics (NACA), 1927
