= Daniel B. Burnett Jr. =

Airplane wing designer (1905–1976)

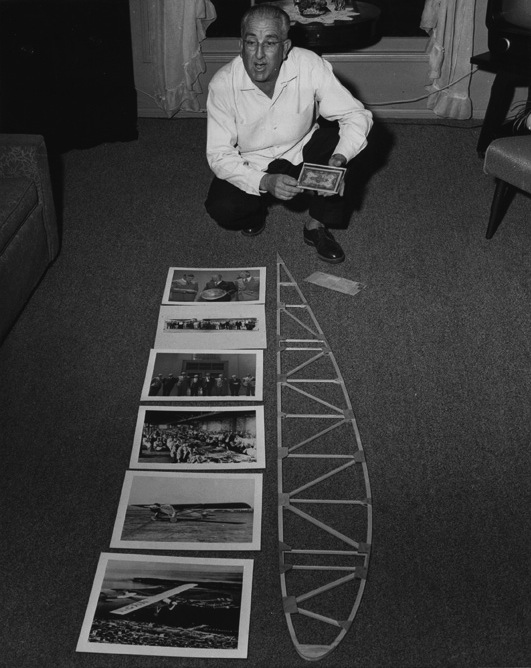
Burnett working on a wing rib design.

Daniel B. Burnett Jr. (November 27, 1905 – June 13, 1976), known by friends as "Dapper Dan", was a friend of Charles Lindbergh, an employee of Ryan Aeronautical of San Diego, and the wing designer of the Spirit of St. Louis. He was born November 27, 1905, in Orange, New Jersey. His daughter, Lorna, explained his nickname by saying, "He was a very snappy dresser and he always wore a homburg hat. Everyone always told him he looked so dapper."

== Early life ==
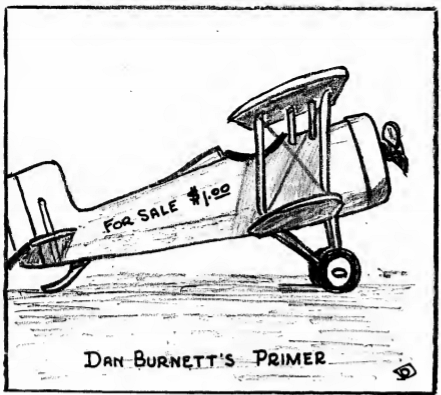
The $1 Plane as illustrated in the Ryan Flying Reporter.

In 1909, three year old Burnett viewed an aviation movie at the Plattsburgh Barracks that left a lifelong impression on him and led him to begin building model airplanes. When he was young, he witnessed an airplane race between Earie Ovington, the first airmail pilot, and Grahame White around the city of Boston. While living in Philadelphia, he rode his bike to the airport on Saturdays to watch the air mail planes. On one such occasion, he even saw the Curtiss NC-4 Trans-Atlantic plane. He later attended University High School in Oakland, California. There, he was the elected president of an aviation club whose specialty was the building of model airplanes. In 1921, he met one of his heroes, Eddie Rickenbacker.Then, in 1922, he moved to San Diego, California, and soon began maintaining airplanes for Ryan Aviation after school. Burnett wanted to share aviation with his high school in San Diego so he asked for help to get an airplane for his school. Phil Swing (local congressman), Admiral Moffett (Chief of Naval Aviation), and General Mason Patrick (Chief of the Army Air Corps) all agreed to have Burnett contribute $1.00 towards a 1916 Sopwith Aircraft for his school. A parade for the plane was held through downtown San Diego in March 1923. Later on, Burnett attempted to stow away on a Lieutenant Kelley's plane but didn't succeed. But after his attempt, he convinced the Lieutenant to speak of his (the Lieutenant's) flights to the school.

== Career ==
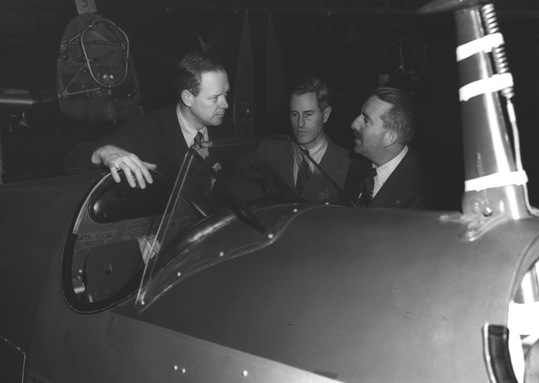
Dapper Dan chatting with Charles Lindbergh.

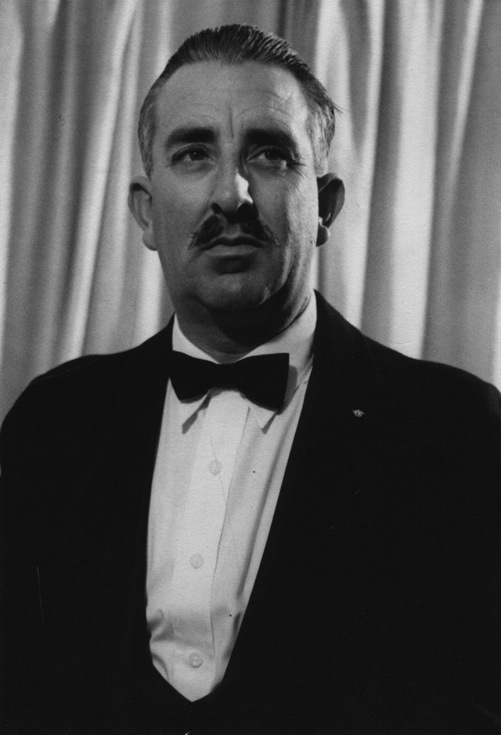
Daniel B. Burnett Jr.

Burnett worked full-time for Ryan Aviation after ending school. One fall, he was laid off but he, determined to work, returned without pay. This resulted in him receiving flying instruction from the company as a Christmas present later that year in 1925. He began flying on his own after instruction of only four hours. In 1926, before even the federal government restricted activities in the air, the City of San Diego set up licensing for pilots. Burnett was within the first three pilots to receive their license from the city. Around this time, Charles Lindbergh came to Ryan to have the Spirit of St. Louis built. Burnett, obsessed with wings, worked on the woodworking and design of the wings. Lindbergh and Burnett became friends throughout the process. Lindbergh's wife even visited Dan's baby shower for his daughter. Before Lindbergh's flight, Burnett asked him to take a one dollar bill and a letter, both signed by Captain Martell and a red carnation given to him by Lieutenant Kelley. The carnation was the first flower to fly across the Atlantic. Lindbergh also said that he prized the possessions. The dollar bill later transferred hands to Sir Hubert Wilkins for his flight to the Antarctic and on Doles' race with Martin Jensen to Honolulu. Dan later worked for a while on parachute development with Jimmy Russell. In 1930, he then worked for the Bowlus Sailplane Company as the Superintendent. Then in 1933, returned to Ryan Aviation. In 1937, he became the foreman of wing and control surface assembly at Ryan. And in 1939, he became the head of the experimental department and was later appointed night superintendent in 1940. The San Diego Air and Space Museum acquired a wing-rib jig that Burnett had built for the Spirit of St. Louis and started selling replica wing ribs in the '80s for $45 along with a certificate of authenticity with Burnetts name on it. Burnett died on June 13, 1976.
