= Peaches (disambiguation) =

Peaches are trees and its edible fruits.

Peaches may also refer to:

== Film and television ==
- Peaches (film), a 2004 movie starring Emma Lung
- The Peaches, a 1963 short film directed by Michael Gill
- "Peaches", an episode of the 2012 television series The River

== Music ==
=== Musicians ===
- Peaches (duo), a Swedish child duo
- Peaches (group), a 1970s Australian band
- Peaches (musician), a Canadian punk/electroclash musician
- The Peaches, a British duo
- Peaches, the stage name of seven different women who have appeared as half of the vocal duo Peaches & Herb
  - Miriamm Wright (born 1971), American singer-songwriter who served as Peaches in 2002
  - Meritxell Negre (1971–2020), Spanish singer-songwriter who served as Peaches in 2009

=== Albums ===
- Peaches: The Very Best of The Stranglers, a 2002 compilation album
- Peaches (EP), a 2021 EP by South Korean singer Kai
- Peaches!, a 2026 cover album by blues-rock duo The Black Keys

=== Songs ===
- "Peaches" (The Stranglers song), 1977
- "Peaches", by the Darts, 1980
- "Peaches" (The Presidents of the United States of America song), 1996
- "Peaches" (In the Valley Below song), 2013
- "Peaches" (Justin Bieber song), 2021
- "Peaches" (Kai song), 2021
- "Peaches" (Jack Black song), 2023
- "Peaches", by Nat King Cole, from the album 10th Anniversary Album

=== Companies ===
- Peaches Records and Tapes, a former American music and entertainment retailer

== Sports ==
=== Athletes ===
- Jane Bartkowicz (born 1949), American tennis player
- Peaches Davis (1905–1995), American Major League Baseball pitcher
- Lori Fullington (born 1967), American professional wrestling manager who wrestled as "Peaches"
- Peaches Graham (1877–1939), American Major League Baseball catcher
- Romanus Nadolney (1899–1963), American National Football League player
- Peaches O'Neill (1879–1955), American Major League Baseball catcher in the 1904 season
- Dan Petry (born 1958), American Major League Baseball pitcher

=== American baseball teams ===
- Macon Peaches, an American minor league baseball franchise in Macon, Georgia
- Marysville Peaches, a former American minor league baseball team in Marysville, California
- Rockford Peaches, a former women's professional baseball team in Rockford, Illinois

== Other people ==
- Peaches (given name)
- Peaches Browning (1910–1956), American actress
- Peaches Geldof (1989–2014), British journalist, television presenter and model
- Tanya Jackson (1970–1997), a formerly-unidentified murder victim from New York who was nicknamed "Peaches"
- Miss Peaches (1924–2011), American comedian and singer
- Tso-ay (c. 1853–1933), Apache warrior and army scout nicknamed "Peaches"
- Peaches Wallace (1909–1930), American pioneering aviator

== Fictional characters ==
- Peaches, in Sam Hurt's comic strip Eyebeam and its spinoff, Queen of the Universe
- Peaches, in the direct-to-DVD video Futurama: Bender's Game (2008)
- Peaches, a woolly mammoth in the franchise Ice Age franchise
- Peaches, in the film Ken Park (2002)
- Peaches, on the television series Rocko's Modern Life

== See also ==
- Peach (disambiguation)
- Peaches and cream (disambiguation)
