= Peaches (given name) =

Peaches is an English given name and hypocorism derived from the name of the fruit.

== Women ==
=== Given name ===
- Peaches Geldof (1989–2014), English columnist, television personality, and model

=== Nickname ===
- Jane "Peaches" Bartkowicz (born 1949), American tennis player
- Peaches Browning (born Frances Belle Heenan; 1910–1956), American actress
- Peaches Golding (born Lois Patricia Golding in 1953), American-British business executive, administrator, and former academic
- Peaches Jackson (born Charlotte Jackson; 1913–2002), American child actress
- Peaches Wallace (born Sarah Wallace; 1909–1930), American aviator

=== Stage name ===
- Peaches (musician) (born 1966), stage name of Canadian electroclash musician and producer Merrill Nisker
- Peaches & Herb, American vocal duo
- Miss Peaches, stage name of American comedian and singer Elsie Higgs Griner Jr. (1924–2011)
- Peaches Christ (born 1974), stage name of American underground drag performer, emcee, filmmaker, and actor Joshua Grannell

== Men ==
=== Nickname ===
- Peaches Davis (born Roy Davis; 1905–1995), American baseball player
- Peaches Graham (born George Graham; 1877–1939), American baseball player
- Romanus "Peaches" Nadolney (1899–1963), American football player
- Peaches O'Neill (born Philip O'Neill; 1879–1955), American baseball player

== See also ==
- Peaches (duo), Swedish child duo
