= 桃子 =

桃子 may refer to:

- Momoko, Japanese feminine given name
- Taozi Township (桃子乡), township-level division of Sichuan

== See also ==
- Peach (disambiguation)
