= San Diego International Airport =

Airport serving San Diego, California, US

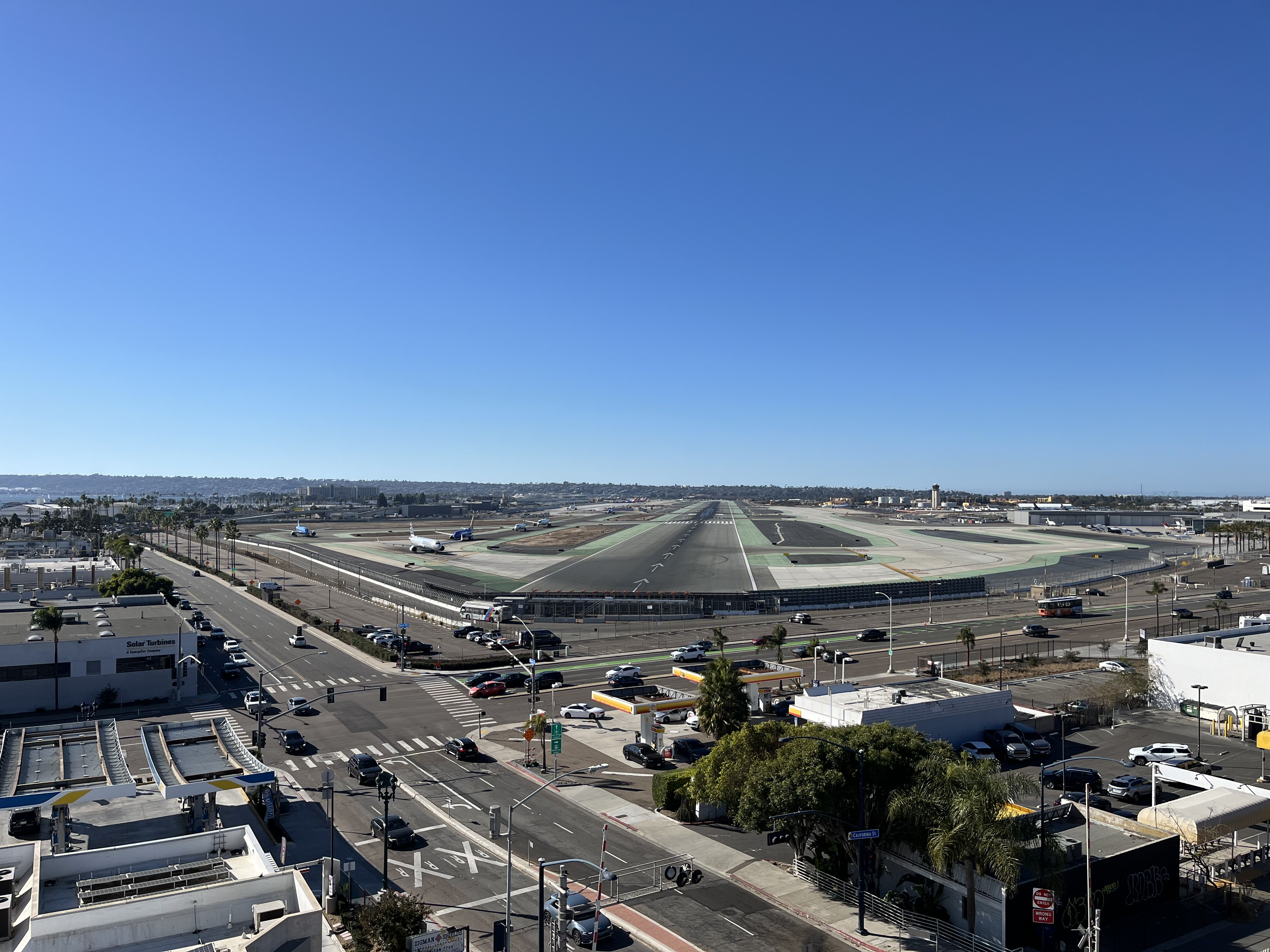
- View of Runway 27
- IATA: SAN; ICAO: KSAN; FAA LID: SAN; WMO: 72290

Summary
- Airport type: Public
- Owner/Operator: San Diego County Regional Airport Authority
- Serves: San Diego–Tijuana
- Location: San Diego, California, U.S.
- Opened: August 16, 1928; 98 years ago
- Hub for: Alaska Airlines
- Elevation AMSL: 17 ft (5.2 m)
- Coordinates: 32°44′01″N 117°11′23″W
- Website: san.org

Maps
- FAA airport diagram
- Interactive map of San Diego International Airport

Runways
Direction	Length		Surface
Direction	ft	m	Surface
09/27	9,401	2,865	Asphalt concrete

Statistics (2025)
- Total passengers: 25,320,556 ▲0.3%
- Aircraft operations: 233,275
- Sources:FAA

San Diego International Airport (IATA: SAN, ICAO: KSAN, FAA LID: SAN) is the primary international airport serving San Diego and its surrounding metropolitan area, in the U.S. state of California. The airport is located three miles (4.8 km; 2.6 nmi) northwest of downtown San Diego. It is the busiest single-runway airport in the United States and has a relatively small footprint, covering 663 acres (268 ha; 1.036 sq mi) of land. The airport is a hub for Alaska Airlines.

The airport is owned and operated by the San Diego County Regional Airport Authority. It operates in controlled airspace served by Southern California TRACON. The airport's landing approach is close to the skyscrapers of downtown San Diego, and can sometimes prove difficult to pilots due to the relatively short usable landing area, steep descent angle over the crest of Bankers Hill, and shifting wind currents just before landing.

== History ==
=== Origins ===
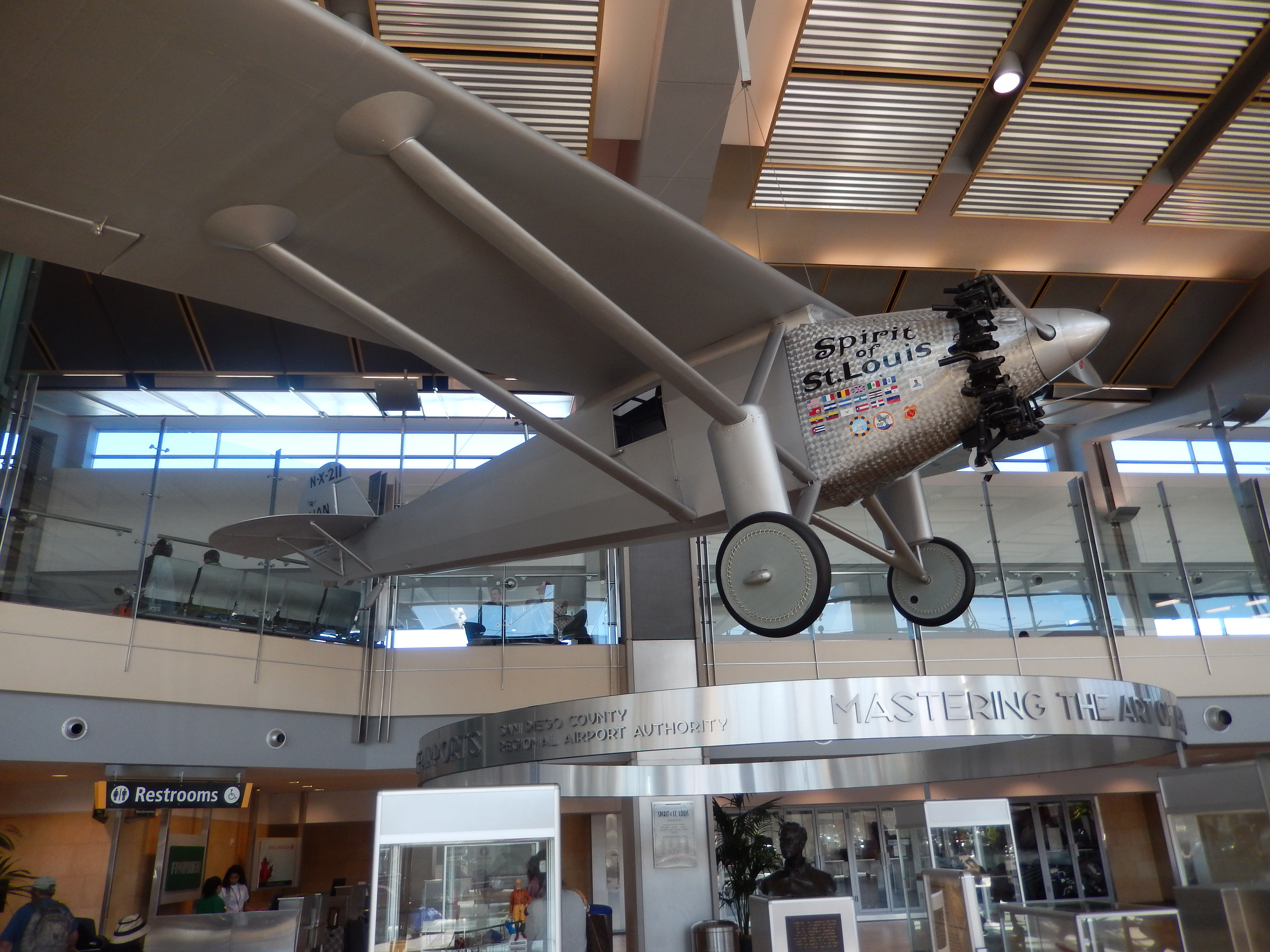
Spirit of St. Louis replica inside the airport

Prior to the development of the airport, the area formed part of the delta of the San Diego River that discharged into San Diego Bay. The river was later rerouted to discharge into the Pacific Ocean west of Mission Bay.

The airport is near the site of the Ryan Aeronautical Company factory, where the Spirit of St. Louis was built for Charles Lindbergh's historic 1927 transatlantic flight. The aircraft was flight-tested at Dutch Flats Airport, Ryan's airfield located near the intersection of Midway and Barnett avenues on the opposite side of Marine Corps Recruit Depot San Diego.

Inspired by Lindbergh's flight and proud to have produced his aircraft, the city of San Diego approved a bond issue in 1928 to construct an airport. Lindbergh encouraged the project and agreed to lend his name to it. The airport was dedicated on August 16, 1928, as San Diego Municipal Airport – Lindbergh Field, with 140 Navy and 82 Army aircraft participating in a flyover.

The airport was the first federally certified airfield to serve all aircraft types, including seaplanes. The original terminal stood on the northeast side of the field along Pacific Highway.

The airport also served as a testing site for several early U.S. sailplane designs, including those by William Hawley Bowlus, superintendent of construction on the Spirit of St. Louis. Bowlus operated the Bowlus Glider School at Lindbergh Field from 1929 to 1930.

In 1930, Ruth Alexander set national and world altitude records for women at the airport.

The airport was the departure point for the first transcontinental glider tow, flown by Capt. Frank Hawks. The flight departed Lindbergh Field on March 30, 1930, and arrived at Van Cortlandt Park in New York City on April 6, 1930. Regular San Diego–Los Angeles airmail service began on June 1, 1930. The airport gained international airport status in 1934.

In April 1937, a United States Coast Guard air base was commissioned next to the airfield. The Coast Guard operated fixed-wing aircraft from Lindbergh Field until the mid-1990s, when those aircraft were reassigned elsewhere.

Consolidated Aircraft (later Convair) had its headquarters adjacent to Lindbergh Field and manufactured military aircraft there during World War II. Today the airport's rental car facility occupies part of the former factory, and the nearby street is named Liberator Way, after the company's B-24 Liberator aircraft. Convair used the airport for test and delivery flights from 1935 to 1995.

The United States Army Air Corps took control of the field in 1942 and expanded it to accommodate heavy bombers manufactured in the region. Two cantonment areas, Camp Consair and Camp Sahara, were established at the airport during World War II. Improvements included construction of an 8,750 ft (2,670 m) runway capable of accommodating large aircraft before jet airliners entered airline service. A May 1952 chart shows an 8,700-foot runway 9 and a 4,500-foot runway 13.

=== Jet age ===
Pacific Southwest Airlines (PSA) established its headquarters in San Diego and started service at Lindbergh Field in 1949. The April 1957 Official Airline Guide shows 42 departures per day: 14 American, 13 United, 6 Western, 6 Bonanza, and 3 PSA (5 PSA on Friday and Sunday). American had a nonstop flight to Dallas and one to El Paso; aside from that, nonstop flights did not reach beyond California and Arizona. The first scheduled flights using jets at Lindbergh Field were in September 1960: American Airlines Boeing 720s to Phoenix and United Airlines 720s to San Francisco. Nonstop flights to Chicago started in 1962 and to New York in 1967.

The airport was built and operated by the City of San Diego through the sale of municipal bonds to be repaid by airport users. In 1962 it was transferred to the San Diego Unified Port District by a state law. The original terminal was on the north side of the airport; the former Terminal 1 opened on the south side of the airport on March 5, 1967. Originally Terminal 1 was only 1 story tall and had no jet bridges, however between 1981 and 1983 Terminal 1 East was given a second floor and jet bridges, and the same was done with Terminal 1 West between 1989 and 1991. Terminal 2 also originally opened on July 11, 1979. These terminals were designed by Paderewski Dean & Associates.

Western Airlines discontinued service to Mexico City in 1981, leaving the airport without any international flights. However, in June 1988, the airport's first transatlantic flight was opened, a British Airways flight to London's Gatwick Airport using Boeing 747s and McDonnell Douglas DC-10s. As San Diego airport's customs facility had not been used in seven years and was not up to the US Customs Service's latest security requirements, inbound travelers had to clear customs in Los Angeles, which made the journey cumbersome. After the Port District performed the necessary upgrades, San Diego Airport's customs facility reopened in 1989 - nevertheless, British Airways ended the route in November 1990.

Between 1991 and 1993, the airport's second runway (Runway 13/31) was closed and retrofitted into taxiways D and F. This runway had been much smaller than the main runway (Runway 9/27) and was unable to be used by commercial jets.

The Commuter Terminal opened on July 23, 1996, a small standalone facility used by all short-haul flights, mostly to Los Angeles, regardless of airline. Service out of the terminal stopped in 2015 after the expansion of Terminal 2 and amid the introduction of larger regional jets. However, the building remained standing until January 2024 as it also housed offices for the San Diego County Regional Airport Authority.

Terminal 2 itself was expanded westward by 300,000 square feet (27,871 m^{2}) on January 7, 1998. The expanded Terminal 2 and the Commuter Terminal were designed by Gensler and SGPA Architecture and Planning.

In 2001, the San Diego County Regional Airport Authority (SDCRAA) was created by California State Assembly Bill 93. The SDCRAA assumed jurisdiction over the airport in December 2002. The Authority changed the airport's name from Lindbergh Field to San Diego International Airport in 2003, reportedly considering the new name "a better fit for a major commercial airport."

The airport's first nonstop flight to Asia began in 2012 with a Tokyo flight.

=== Relocation proposals ===
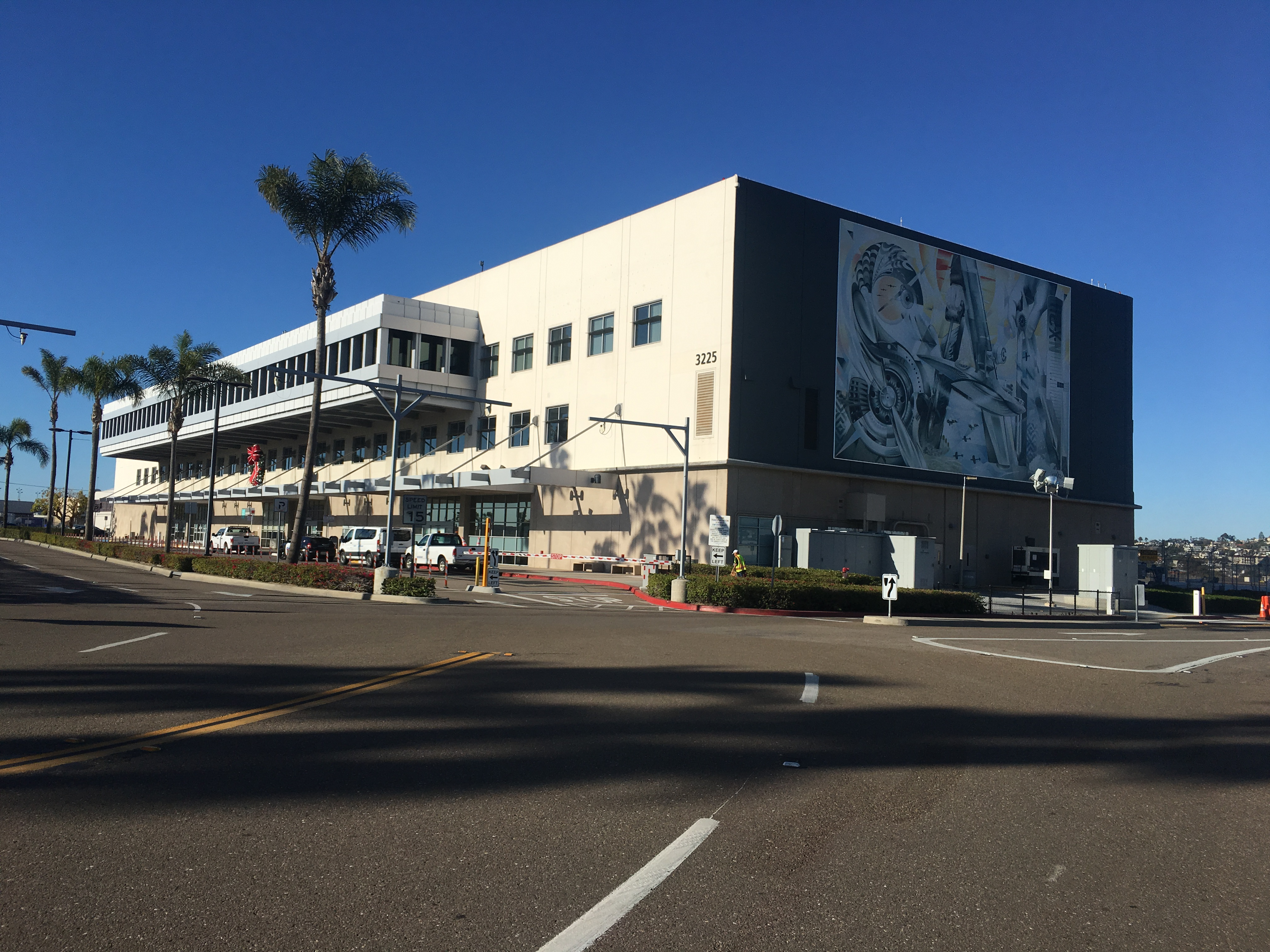
The former Commuter Terminal, operated until 2015 and demolished in January 2024.

As far back as 1950, there have been proposals to relocate San Diego International Airport. In 1950, the city of San Diego acquired what is today Montgomery-Gibbs Executive Airport and much of the land surrounding it through eminent domain to build a replacement airport, but the Korean War brought with it a massive expansion in jet traffic to nearby Naval Air Station Miramar, which soon rendered a commercial service airport in the area impractical. The CAA refused to fund any major enhancements to SDIA through the 1950s, and at various times the city proposed NAS North Island, Mission Bay, and Brown Field as replacements. Cost, conflicts with the Navy, and potential interference with other air traffic stymied these plans.

While in 1964 the FAA finally agreed to an expansion of SDIA, which led to the construction of today's Terminal 1, it was only allowed with the assurance of San Diego Mayor Charles Dail that it would be a temporary measure until a replacement airport could be found. From that time until 2006, various public agencies conducted studies on potential locations for a replacement airport. One revisited a study done in the 1980s by the City in 1994 when Naval Air Station Miramar closed and was then immediately transferred to the US Marine Corps as Marine Corps Air Station Miramar. Another was by the City of San Diego in 1984 and another that started in 1996 and sat dormant with SANDAG until the airport authority was formed.

In 2001, the SDCRAA projected SAN would be constrained by congestion between 2015 and 2022; the Great Recession, however, extended the forecast capacity limitations into the 2030s. In June 2006, SDCRAA board members selected Marine Corps Air Station Miramar as its preferred site for a replacement airport, despite military objections the compromises this would require would severely interfere with the readiness and training of aviators stationed at the air station. On November 7, 2006, San Diego County residents rejected an advisory relocation ballot that included a joint use proposal measure over these and related concerns over the potential impact reducing the region's military value would have on the defense-focused San Diego economy. With the relocation proposals now defeated, San Diego Airport began looking to improve its existing facilities.

=== Modern expansion ===
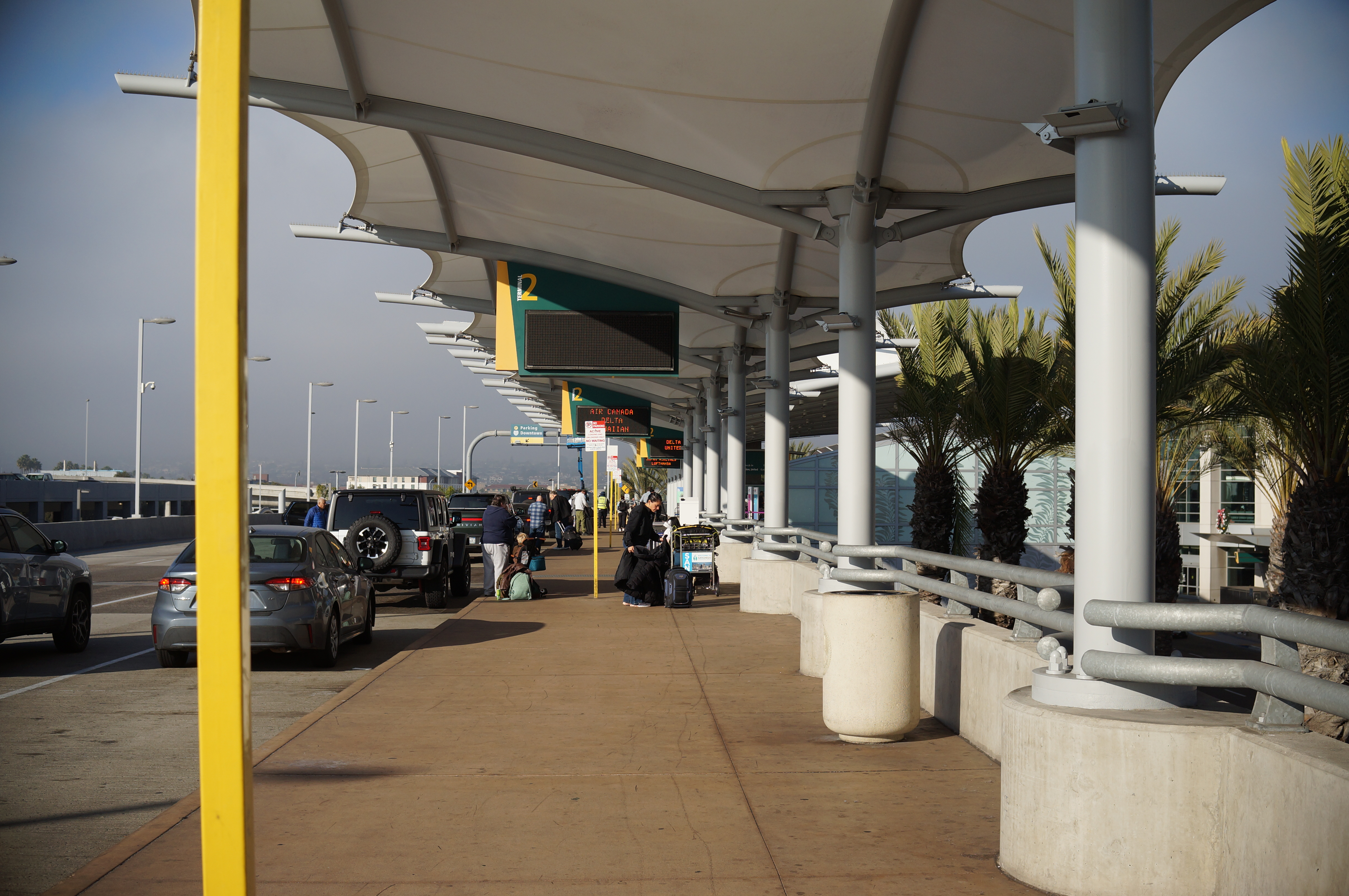
Terminal 2 upper-level departures roadway

The first major 21st-century expansion of the airport was "The Green Build," adding 10 gates to Terminal 2 West, as well as a new security checkpoint, a scenic dining area dubbed "Sunset Cove," a new USO Center, and a dual-level arrivals and departures roadway for the entirety of Terminal 2. Completed on August 13, 2013, at a cost of US$900 million, it was followed in January 2016 by the opening of a consolidated rental car facility on the airport's north side. The US$316 million, 2-million-square-foot (190,000 m^{2}) facility houses 14 rental car companies and is served by shuttle buses to and from the terminals. In July 2016, construction began on a three-story 5,200-space parking structure in front of Terminal 2, which was completed in May 2018.

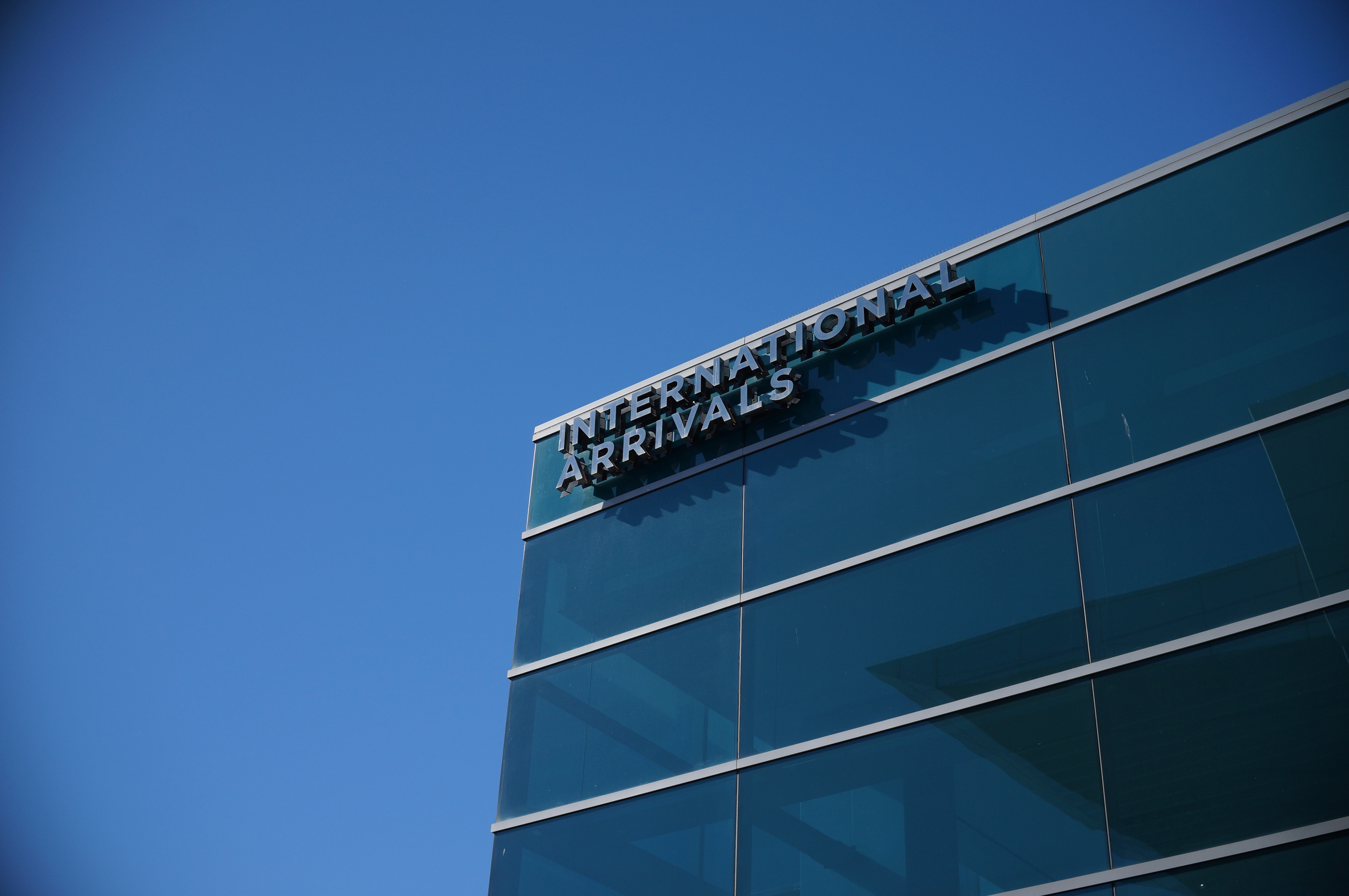
International Arrivals Facility at the southwest corner of Terminal 2

Given annual arrivals at Terminal 2 East's three international gates (20–22) had increased from 50,000 passengers in 1990 to more than 400,000 in 2017, a new international arrivals facility for the airport was built at Terminal 2 West. Construction began in 2017 and completed in June 2018, adding vertical circulation and an upper level connecting six of the Green Build gates (46–51) to a 55,000-square-foot (5,100 m^{2}) international arrivals processing facility at the southwest corner of the terminal.

After many years of planning, construction on a complete replacement of Terminal 1 began in 2021. Divided into two phases, Phase 1 of the project includes a 19-gate standalone terminal east of the original facility, a five-story 5,200-space parking structure, a dual-level arrivals and departures roadway similar to Terminal 2's, a new entry road parallel to Harbor Drive, and an expanded taxiway A to pair with existing taxiway B. Phase 1 opened on September 22, 2025, at a cost of US$2.6 billion. Phase 2, to begin after Phase 1's opening and planned for completion in 2028, will demolish the original Terminal 1 and add 11 additional gates to the new Terminal 1 in its place. An area west of the new Terminal 1's parking structure was left vacant to accommodate a station for the proposed "Airport Transit Connection," a project under study by SANDAG to connect the airport to Downtown San Diego via a transit line of a yet to be decided mode.

A new administration building for the San Diego County Regional Airport Authority opened in December 2023 just west of Terminal 2, relocating offices previously housed on the upper floors of the Commuter Terminal. Its relocation enabled the long unused by passengers Commuter Terminal to be demolished, making way for Phase 1 of the new Terminal 1.

On September 23, 2025, Phase 1 of the new Terminal 1 opened with 19 gates. Aircraft began arriving at the new terminal on the evening of September 22 to position them for departures the following morning. Several Southwest Airlines flights were the first to arrive and received water salutes from the airport fire department. The original Terminal 1 continued to handle departures for the remainder of the evening on September 22. Several Southwest Airlines flights operated the final departures from the old terminal. In 2026, two additional gates opened in Terminal 1.

Southwest Airlines 737-700 plane in old livery on final approach to Runway 27

== Facilities ==
=== Terminals ===
San Diego International Airport has two terminals and 52 gates:

- Terminal 1 currently has 21 gates in use, with 9 more planned to open by 2028.
- Terminal 2 has two concourses with 31 gates. The older East concourse has 12 gates and the newer West concourse has 19 gates, along with the airport's international arrivals facility.

=== Runway ===
SAN runway and terminal layout prior to June 2015

The airport has one runway, designated 09/27 for its magnetic headings of 95 degrees and 275 degrees. The runway, built of asphalt and concrete, measures 9,401 by 200 feet (2,865 m × 61 m). Each end has a displaced threshold: on Runway 27, the first 1,810 feet (550 m) are displaced, while the first 1,000 feet (300 m) are displaced on Runway 9. The west end of the runway has an engineered materials arrestor system, installed in 2006 and expanded in 2021.

Most takeoffs and landings use Runway 27, as the predominant westerly winds favor its use. However, in Santa Ana wind conditions, where winds shift toward the east, operations reverse and Runway 9 is used for takeoffs and landings instead. Marine layer conditions that lower the cloud ceiling below visual flight rules minimums will also trigger an operations reversal to Runway 9, as Runway 27 lacks an instrument landing system (as the steep terrain on approach makes such a system infeasible). These reversals to Runway 9 can cause delays, as the airport's taxiway layout is constrictive, given there is only one taxiway (B) that spans the entire length of the airport's sole runway. When enough planes line up to take off on Runway 9, they will block planes that have just landed on Runway 9 from getting to their gate. Compounding this is some heavier aircraft being restricted from departing on Runway 9 at all, which in reversed operations requires these aircraft to taxi against the flow of taxiway B to the end of Runway 27, where they will wait for sometimes multiple hours until their departure can be accommodated by air traffic control. In rare cases of severe gridlock, planes will be instructed by ground control to backtaxi on the runway, a procedure not typically utilized by commercial airports. The creation of a new taxiway A as part of the new Terminal 1 project aims to reduce aircraft ground movement-related delays like these.

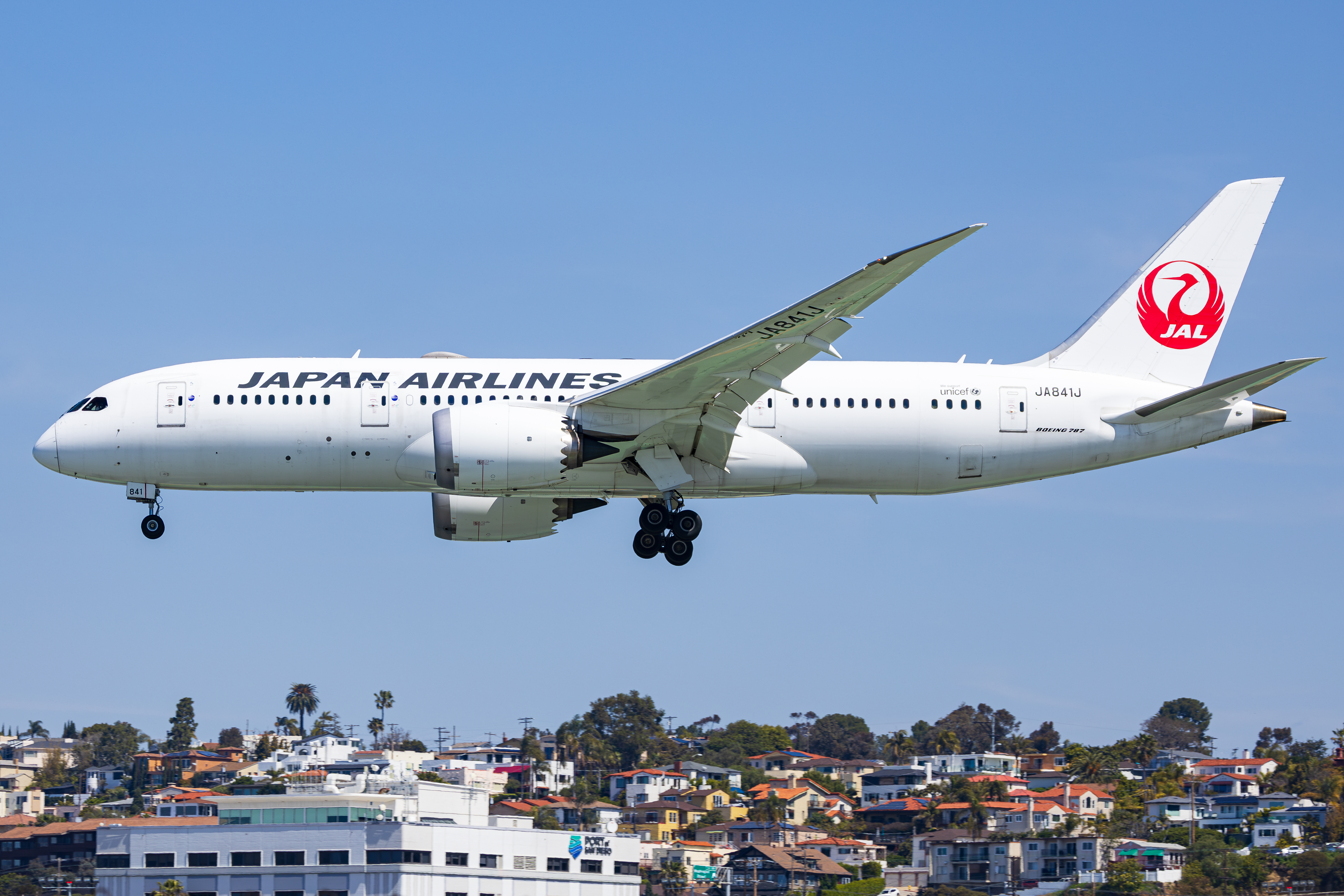
A JAL Boeing 787-8 aircraft on approach to Runway 27, passing over buildings close to the runway threshold

The approach to Runway 27 is unusually steep due to utility poles and over 200-foot-tall (61 m) buildings within 2 miles (3.2 km; 1.7 nmi) of the runway threshold. Although nearby skyscrapers are not considered an obstacle, the approach has been compared to those at Charles B. Wheeler Downtown Airport in Kansas City and Hong Kong's former Kai Tak Airport.

To appease the concerns of the airport's neighbors regarding noise and to head off any ensuing lawsuits, a curfew was implemented in 1979 whereby takeoffs are only allowed between 6:30 a.m. and 11:30 p.m. Outside these hours, they are subject to a large fine. However, law enforcement, emergency, fire or rescue aircraft, and medical flights can operate normally. Arrivals are permitted 24 hours per day.

=== Ground transportation ===
The airport is on North Harbor Drive, which is accessible from Interstate 5 northbound via the Hawthorn Street exit and southbound via the Sassafras Street exit. Parking garages are located in front of both terminals and each has around 5,200 spaces. The airport also offers valet service curbside at the terminals. Both terminals have designated areas for taxis and ride-share pickups.

=== Public transportation ===
There are three public transportation options:

- Metropolitan Transit System route 992: operates between downtown San Diego, Terminal 1 and Terminal 2. Route 992 operates from 5 a.m. to 12:30 a.m. with buses arriving every 15 minutes. Route 992 connects to several major transportation hubs in downtown San Diego:
  - Santa Fe Depot served by Amtrak, Coaster, the Blue and Green lines of the San Diego Trolley, and Rapid buses
  - City College station served by the Blue and Orange lines of the San Diego Trolley, and Rapid buses
- SAN Flyer shuttle: complimentary buses operate between the airport and Old Town Transit Center every 20 to 25 minutes. Pickup and drop-offs are timed to meet the first and last Trolley, Coasters, Amtrak trains, and MTS buses. Passengers can transfer via Old Town Transit Center to Amtrak, Coaster, along with Blue and Green lines trains of the San Diego Trolley.
- Trolley to Terminal shuttle: The airport's complimentary buses between the terminals and consolidated rental car facility also stops on Admiral Boland Way near West Palm Street, 800 feet (240 m) from the San Diego Trolley's Middletown station. Passengers walking from Middletown station can board shuttles here for either terminal. From the airport, passengers must tell the driver they wish to be dropped off for the Trolley, as the shuttle does not automatically stop.

Extension of the San Diego Trolley to directly serve the airport terminals has been proposed several times, but has not yet come to fruition. A 2021 study has found that such an extension to the airport is feasible and could be completed within ten years.

The airport is the proposed terminus of the second phase of the California High-Speed Rail project.

=== Military ===
Coast Guard Air Station San Diego is near the southeast corner of the airport. The installation originally supported seaplane operations during the 1970s, 1980s, and early 1990s, when the station had HU-25 Guardian jets assigned.

=== Airline Support Building ===
The 93,000-square-foot (8,600 m^{2}) Airline Support Building, which houses cargo operations and aircraft provisions storage and serves as a pickup and drop-off point for live animals and large cargo, opened on July 20, 2021. Located on the south side of the airfield along North Harbor Drive.

=== Other facilities ===
Signature Aviation is the fixed-base operator (FBO) at San Diego International Airport. The FBO ramp is at the northeast end of the airfield.

Stormwater is captured on Terminal 2 Parking Plaza and used in the cooling towers that heat, ventilate and air condition the terminals and jet bridges.

A portion of the southeast infield at San Diego International Airport is set aside as a nesting site for the endangered California least tern. April through September is the least tern nesting season at SAN. Since 1970, this endangered migratory sea bird has found a suitable nesting site each year in the sand and gravel located in four oval areas between the runway and airplane taxiway. Approximately 135 nests were established there in 2007.

== Airlines and destinations ==
=== Passenger ===
As of November 2026, San Diego International Airport has nonstop scheduled passenger flights to 90 destinations, including 13 international destinations in 8 foreign countries.

Airlines	Destinations
Air Canada	Seasonal: Montréal–Trudeau, Toronto–Pearson, Vancouver
Air Canada Express	Vancouver
Air Canada Rouge	Toronto–Pearson; Seasonal: Vancouver
Air France	Paris–Charles de Gaulle (begins May 3, 2027)
Alaska Airlines	Austin, Boise, Boston, Bozeman, Chicago–O'Hare, Dallas/Fort Worth, Denver, Eugene, Everett, Fresno, Honolulu, Jackson Hole, Kahului, Kailua-Kona, Las Vegas, Lihue, Medford, Monterey, New York–JFK, Newark, Oakland, Orlando, Phoenix–Sky Harbor, Portland (OR), Puerto Vallarta, Raleigh/Durham, Redmond/Bend, Reno/Tahoe, Sacramento, Salt Lake City, San Francisco, San Jose (CA), San José del Cabo, San Luis Obispo, Santa Barbara, Santa Rosa, Seattle/Tacoma, Spokane, Tampa, Tulsa, Washington–Dulles, Washington–National; Seasonal: Anchorage, Eagle/Vail, Fort Lauderdale, Glacier Park/Kalispell, Hayden/Steamboat Springs, Loreto (begins December 19, 2026), Missoula, Sun Valley
American Airlines	Charlotte, Chicago–O'Hare, Dallas/Fort Worth, Miami, Philadelphia, Phoenix–Sky Harbor
Breeze Airways	Seasonal: Cincinnati, Jacksonville (FL), Norfolk, Pittsburgh, Raleigh/Durham
British Airways	London–Heathrow
Copa Airlines	Panama City–Tocumen
Delta Air Lines	Atlanta, Austin (begins April 12, 2027), Boston, Detroit, Minneapolis/St. Paul, New York–JFK, Salt Lake City, Seattle/Tacoma
Delta Connection	Los Angeles; Seasonal: Salt Lake City
Frontier Airlines	Dallas/Fort Worth, Denver, Las Vegas, Phoenix–Sky Harbor, San Francisco
Hawaiian Airlines	Honolulu
Japan Airlines	Tokyo–Narita
JetBlue	Boston, Fort Lauderdale, New York–JFK
KLM	Amsterdam
Lufthansa	Munich
Southwest Airlines	Albuquerque, Austin, Baltimore, Boise, Boston, Chicago–Midway, Colorado Springs, Columbus–Glenn, Dallas–Love, Denver, El Paso, Eugene, Fresno, Honolulu, Houston–Hobby, Indianapolis, Kahului, Kailua-Kona (resumes March 13, 2027), Kansas City, Las Vegas, Lihue (resumes March 13, 2027), Milwaukee, Nashville, New Orleans, Oakland, Oklahoma City (begins June 6, 2027), Omaha, Orlando, Phoenix–Sky Harbor, Pittsburgh, Portland (OR), Puerto Vallarta, Reno/Tahoe, Sacramento, St. Louis, Salt Lake City, San Antonio, San Francisco, San Jose (CA), San José del Cabo, Santa Barbara, Santa Rosa, Seattle/Tacoma, Spokane, Tampa, Tucson; Seasonal: Bozeman, Fort Lauderdale
Sun Country Airlines	Minneapolis/St. Paul
United Airlines	Chicago–O'Hare, Denver, Houston–Intercontinental, Los Angeles, Newark, San Francisco, Washington–Dulles
United Express	Seasonal: Los Angeles, San Francisco
WestJet	Calgary

=== Destinations map ===
Continental United States destinations
Continental U.S. destinations from San Diego International Airport
Red = Year-round destination
Green = Seasonal destination
Blue = Future destination
Alaska and Hawaii destinations
Alaska destinations from San Diego International Airport
Green = Seasonal destination
Hawaii destinations from San Diego International Airport
Red = Year-round destination
North America international destinations
North American international destinations from San Diego International Airport
Red = Year-round destination
Green = Seasonal destination
Blue = Future destination
Asia and Europe international destinations
Asia destinations from San Diego International Airport
Red = Year-round destination
Blue = Future destination
Europe destinations from San Diego International Airport
Red = Year-round destination
Blue = Future destination

=== Cargo ===
Airlines	Destinations	Refs
DHL Aviation operated by 21 Air	El Paso	
FedEx Express	Indianapolis, Memphis, Oakland, Ontario	
FedEx Feeder operated by Empire Airlines	Tijuana	
FedEx Feeder operated by West Air	Imperial/El Centro	
UPS Airlines	Louisville, Ontario	

== Statistics ==
=== Top destinations ===
Busiest domestic routes from SAN (September 2025 – August 2026)
Rank	City	Passengers	Carriers
1	Denver, Colorado	823,902	Alaska, Frontier, Southwest, United
2	San Francisco, California	813,144	Alaska, Frontier, Southwest, United
3	Phoenix–Sky Harbor, Arizona	712,771	Alaska, American, Frontier, Southwest
4	Seattle/Tacoma, Washington	625,796	Alaska, Delta, Southwest
5	Las Vegas, Nevada	615,426	Alaska, Delta, Frontier, Southwest
6	Dallas/Fort Worth, Texas	586,450	Alaska, American, Frontier
7	Sacramento, California	585,280	Alaska, Southwest
8	Chicago–O'Hare, Illinois	565,832	Alaska, American, United
9	San Jose, California	545,692	Alaska, Southwest
10	Atlanta, Georgia	399,530	Alaska, Delta

Busiest international routes from San Diego (September 2025 – August 2026)
Rank	City	Passengers	Carriers
1	London–Heathrow, United Kingdom	240,038	British Airways
2	San José del Cabo, Mexico	173,218	Alaska, Southwest
3	Munich, Germany	136,626	Lufthansa
4	Vancouver, Canada	107,857	Air Canada, Westjet
5	Tokyo–Narita, Japan	92,565	Japan Airlines
6	Toronto–Pearson, Canada	86,837	Air Canada, Porter
7	Calgary, Canada	67,854	WestJet
8	Panama City–Tocumen, Panama	54,052	Copa Airlines
9	Puerto Vallarta, Mexico	51,626	Alaska
10	Amsterdam, Netherlands	45,736	KLM

=== Airline market share ===
Airline market share at SAN (September 2025 – August 2026)
Rank	Airline	Passengers	Share
1	Southwest Airlines	9,537,364	35.3%
2	Alaska Airlines	5,998,614	22.2%
3	United Airlines	3,193,220	11.8%
4	Delta Air Lines	3,110,391	11.5%
5	American Airlines	2,848,112	10.5%
–	Other airlines	2,400,500	9.0%

=== Annual traffic ===
Historical passenger data at SAN 1988-2025
Year	Passengers	Year	Passengers	Year	Passengers	Year	Passengers
1988	10,748,729	1998	14,340,447	2008	18,419,621	2018	24,240,864
1989	11,111,080	1999	14,971,261	2009	17,316,835	2019	25,216,947
1990	10,937,026	2000	15,746,445	2010	17,205,100	2020	9,238,882
1991	11,185,920	2001	14,942,061	2011	16,891,690	2021	15,602,505
1992	11,759,091	2002	14,731,518	2012	17,250,265	2022	22,009,921
1993	11,817,706	2003	15,304,975	2013	17,710,241	2023	24,061,607
1994	12,681,985	2004	16,517,153	2014	18,758,751	2024	25,242,377
1995	12,908,395	2005	17,569,355	2015	20,081,258	2025	25,320,556
1996	13,461,361	2006	17,673,483	2016	20,729,353	2026	
1997	13,900,712	2007	18,673,441	2017	22,173,493	2027	

Note: Obtained passenger data for 2011–present from air traffic reports; data does not match up with the Historical Passenger table from 2011 to 2018.

== Accidents and incidents ==
- On April 29, 1929, a Ford Trimotor operated by Maddux Air Lines collided in mid-air with a PW-9D shortly after taking off from Lindbergh Field. The aircraft collided over downtown San Diego, killing all five aboard the Trimotor and the USAAC pilot of PW-9D. According to eyewitness accounts, shortly before the collision the Air Corps pilot had been flying extremely close to the larger airliner in an impromptu show for viewers on the ground, when he misjudged the distance between the two aircraft and crashed into it.
- On June 2, 1941, the first British Consolidated LB-30 Liberator II, AL503, on its acceptance flight for delivery from the Consolidated Aircraft Company plant in San Diego, crashed into San Diego Bay when the flight controls froze, killing all five of the civilian crew: Consolidated Aircraft Company's chief test pilot William Wheatley, co-pilot Alan Austen, flight engineer Bruce Kilpatrick Craig, and two chief mechanics, Lewis McCannon and William Reiser. Craig had been commissioned a 2nd lieutenant in the US Army Reserve in 1935 following Infantry ROTC training at the Georgia Institute of Technology, where he earned a Bachelor of Science degree in aeronautical engineering. He had applied for a commission in the US Army Air Corps before his death; this was granted posthumously, with the rank of 2nd lieutenant. On August 25, 1941, the airfield in his hometown of Selma, Alabama was renamed Craig Field, later Craig Air Force Base. Investigation into the cause of the accident caused a two-month delay in deliveries, resulting in the Royal Air Force not receiving Liberator IIs until August 1941.
- On May 10, 1943, the first Consolidated XB-32 Dominator, 41–141, crashed on take-off at Lindbergh Field, likely from failure of the flaps. Although the bomber did not burn when it piled up at the end of the runway, Consolidated's senior test pilot Dick McMakin was killed. Six others on board were injured. This was one of only two twin-finned B-32s (41–142 was the other); all subsequent planes had a PB4Y-style single tail.
- On November 22, 1944, Consolidated PB4Y-2 Privateer, BuNo 59544, on a pre-delivery test flight from Lindbergh Field, took off at 12:23 am, lost its left outer wing on climb-out, and crashed in a ravine in an undeveloped area of Loma Portal near the Naval Training Center, less than 2 miles (3.2 km) from the runway. All six members of the Consolidated Vultee test crew were killed, including pilot Marvin R. Weller, co-pilot Conrad C. Cappe, flight engineers Frank D. Sands and Clifford P. Bengston, radio operator Robert B. Skala, and Consolidated Vultee field operations employee Ray Estes. A wing panel landed on a home at 3121 Kingsley Street in Loma Portal. The cause was found to be 98 missing bolts; the wing was only attached with four spar bolts. Four employees who either were responsible for installation, or were inspectors who signed off on the undone work, were fired two days later. A San Diego coroner's jury found Consolidated Vultee guilty of "gross negligence" by vote of 11–1 on January 5, 1945, and the Bureau of Aeronautics reduced its contract by one at a cost to firm of US$155,000. Consolidated Vultee paid out US$130,484 to the families of the six dead crew.
- On April 5, 1945, the prototype Ryan XFR-1 Fireball, BuNo 48234, on a test flight over Lindbergh Field, lost skin between the front and rear spars of the right wing, interrupting airflow over the wing and causing it to break apart. Ryan test pilot Dean Lake bailed out as the airframe disintegrated. The wreckage struck a brand new Consolidated PB4Y-2 Privateer, BuNo 59836, just accepted by the US Navy and preparing to depart for the modification center at Litchfield Park, Arizona. The bomber caught fire and the four man Navy crew was forced to evacuate the burning PB4Y, with aviation machinist J. H. Randall suffering first, second, and third degree burns and minor lacerations while the rest of the crew was uninjured.
- On April 30, 1945, just before midnight, the first production Consolidated PB4Y-2 Privateer, BuNo 59359, was being prepared on the ramp at Lindbergh Field for a flight to Naval Air Station Twin Cities in Minneapolis, Minnesota. A mechanic attempted to remove the left battery solenoid, located 14 inches (36 cm) below the cockpit floor, but did so without disconnecting the battery. A ratchet wrench accidentally punctured a hydraulic line 3 inches (7.6 cm) above the battery and the fluid ignited, setting the entire aircraft alight. The mechanic suffered severe burns. Only the number four (outer right) engine was deemed salvageable. The cause was an unqualified mechanic attempting a task that only a qualified electrician should perform.
- On August 5, 1952, Convair B-36D-25-CF Peacemaker, 49-2661, returning from a pre-delivery test after being modified for the San-San project, suffered an uncontrollable engine fire in the right wing while attempting to land at Lindbergh Field. The #4 and #5 engines fell off the aircraft as the Convair test crew steered the crippled bomber towards the ocean. Seven of the eight crew on board bailed out, with Pilot David H. Franks heroically electing to stay with the aircraft to prevent it turning back towards the heavily populated coast, but flight engineer W.W. Hoffman drowned before he could be rescued. A USAF accident investigation was inconclusive, with a failure in the #5 engine's alternator, supercharger, fuel or exhaust systems suggested as possible causes.
- On July 15, 1953, the prototype Convair XP5Y-1 Tradewind seaplane, BuNo 121455, on a test flight off Point Loma after taking off from the water next to Lindbergh Field, fractured an elevator torque tube rendering the aircraft uncontrollable. All nine on board bailed out safely and were rescued.
- On November 4, 1954, an experimental Convair YF2Y Sea Dart seaplane, BuNo 135762, on a demonstration flight for Navy officials over San Diego Bay after taking off from the water next to Lindbergh Field, disintegrated in mid-air after its pilot inadvertently exceeded the airframe's structural limits. Convair test pilot Charles E. Richbourg was pulled from the water but did not survive.
- On September 25, 1978, a Boeing 727-200 operating flight PSA Flight 182 on the Sacramento–Los Angeles–San Diego route collided in mid-air with a Cessna 172 while attempting to land at San Diego Airport. The two aircraft collided over San Diego's North Park neighborhood, killing all 135 people on Flight 182, the two people in the Cessna, and seven people on the ground. An NTSB accident investigation found the probable accident's cause was the PSA flight crew's failure to inform the tower they had lost sight of the Cessna, in contradiction to air traffic control instructions to "keep visual separation" from the smaller aircraft. Other factors named were errors on the part of ATC, including the use of pilot-maintained visual separation when ATC-monitored radar separation was available, and an unexpected turn by the Cessna that put it directly in the path of the 727.
- On August 11, 2023, Southwest Airlines Flight 2493 and a Cessna Citation V business jet nearly collided, but this was avoided when the Cessna aborted its landing and passed over the Southwest plane waiting to depart by 100 feet. There were no injuries.
- On May 20, 2025, Hawaiian Airlines Flight 15, an Airbus A330, was pushed back from its gate for departure to Honolulu International Airport. At 8:45am PT, Port of San Diego Harbor Police received a dispatch call from the captain advising them of a possible bomb threat on board. During pushback, flight attendants overheard a guest making threats to the safety of their aircraft. All 293 occupants were deplaned and the FBI cleared the plane. It was determined that a Navy technician had made fake bomb threats to a passenger next to him. He was arrested.
- On June 8, 2025, a Cessna 414 owned by vitamin and dietary supplement maker Optimal Health Systems crashed into the ocean off the coast of Point Loma shortly after takeoff. All six occupants were reported missing and later confirmed to have been killed in the crash.
- On September 17, 2025, a Cessna Citation X N769XJ suffered a nose wheel collapse upon takeoff. The airport was subsequently closed for 5 hours, with many flights diverting to surrounding airports. There were no reported injuries.

== See also ==
- California World War II Army Airfields
- Tijuana International Airport
