= Dutch Flat =

Dutch Flat or Dutch Flats may refer to:

- Dutch Flat, California, an unincorporated community in northern California
- Dutch Flat (Arizona), a valley in Arizona
- Dutch Flats Airport, a historic airfield in San Diego, California
