= Irving, Kansas =

Ghost town in Marshall County, Kansas

- Ghost town
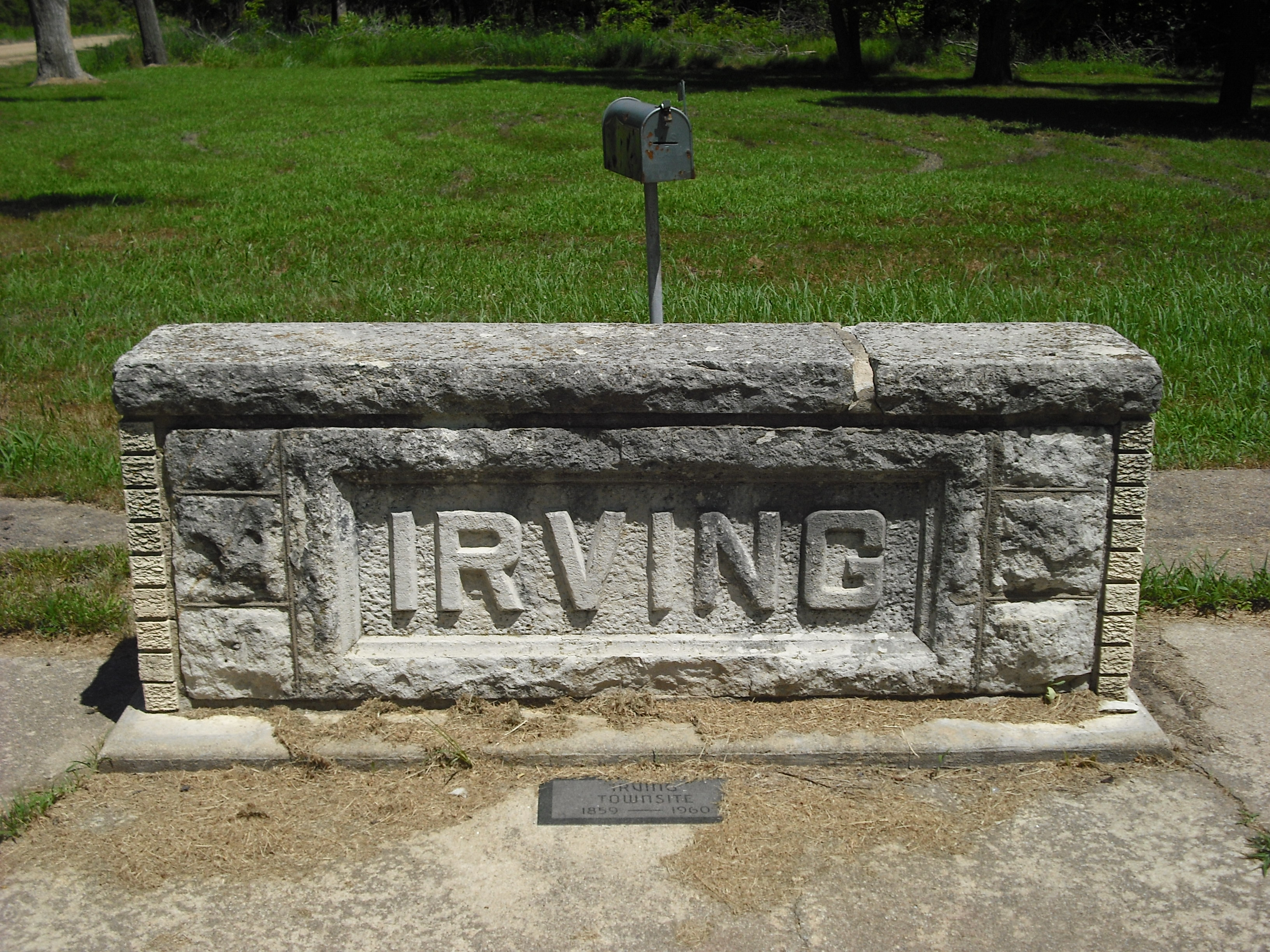
- Irving stone marker, located where the post office once stood.

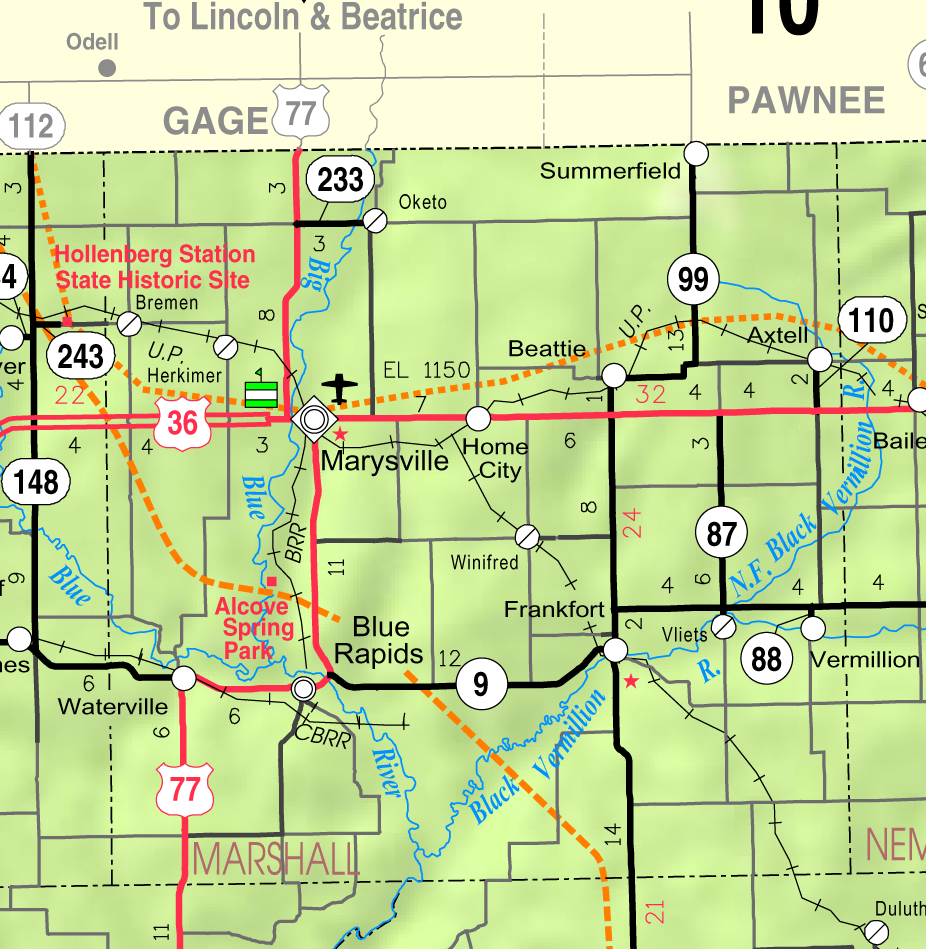
- KDOT map of Marshall County (legend)

- Location within Kansas Location within the United States
- Coordinates: 39°38′20″N 96°35′51″W
- Country: United States
- State: Kansas
- County: Marshall
- Founded: 1859
- Named for: Washington Irving
- Elevation: 1,142 ft (348 m)

Population
  - Total: 0
- Time zone: UTC-6 (CST)
  - Summer (DST): UTC-5 (CDT)
- FIPS code: 20-14325
- GNIS ID: 481910

Irving is a ghost town in Marshall County, Kansas, United States, located six miles southeast of the city of Blue Rapids along the Big Blue River. Irving was one of the many towns affected by "Big Dam Foolishness" during the construction of Tuttle Creek Lake about ten miles to the south. Although the lake never reached the town, the federal government forced remaining residents to vacate the town.

== History ==
Irving was founded in 1859 by a small group from Lyons, Iowa. They named the town after author Washington Irving. In the spring of 1860, a severe drought ruined crops and forced some farmers to lose their land. Over the summer the area was wracked with fierce winds and thunderstorms that blew down buildings, took roofs and damaged the saw mill. During the fall, some residents chose to leave and return to Iowa. In 1866, the community was invaded by grasshoppers that also destroyed crops and damaged trees. The town would have another plague in 1875. Despite these hardships, in 1878, Irving was described as "being located in one of the best settled and best cultivated portions of Marshall County"

On May 30, 1879, two tornadoes destroyed most of the town, leaving 19 dead and many more injured. These tornadoes were extensively studied by the pioneer American meteorologist John Park Finley, and author L. Frank Baum may have named the main character of his Wonderful Wizard of Oz, Dorothy Gale after one of the victims. Some residents left Irving, but the town was rebuilt, and new businesses arrived, allowing Irving to regain its prominence as a local agricultural center.

During the summer of 1903, the Big Blue River flooded and destroyed homes, crops and bridges. The river threatened to do it again in 1908 but the townspeople were prepared and were able to keep the river within its banks. In 1910 the population was estimated at 403 and boasted "good banking facilities, a weekly newspaper, telegraph and express offices, graded schools, public library, churches of all denominations, and three rural routes extend from the Irving post office."

After plans for the construction of the Tuttle Creek Dam were announced, the population declined and many businesses, including the post office, closed. The townsite was abandoned in 1960 after the dam was constructed. Nevertheless, because the lake is miles away, Irving remains accessible and its road network and building foundations visible. A stone marker sits in a makeshift park along with a mailbox and notebook in which visitors can write.

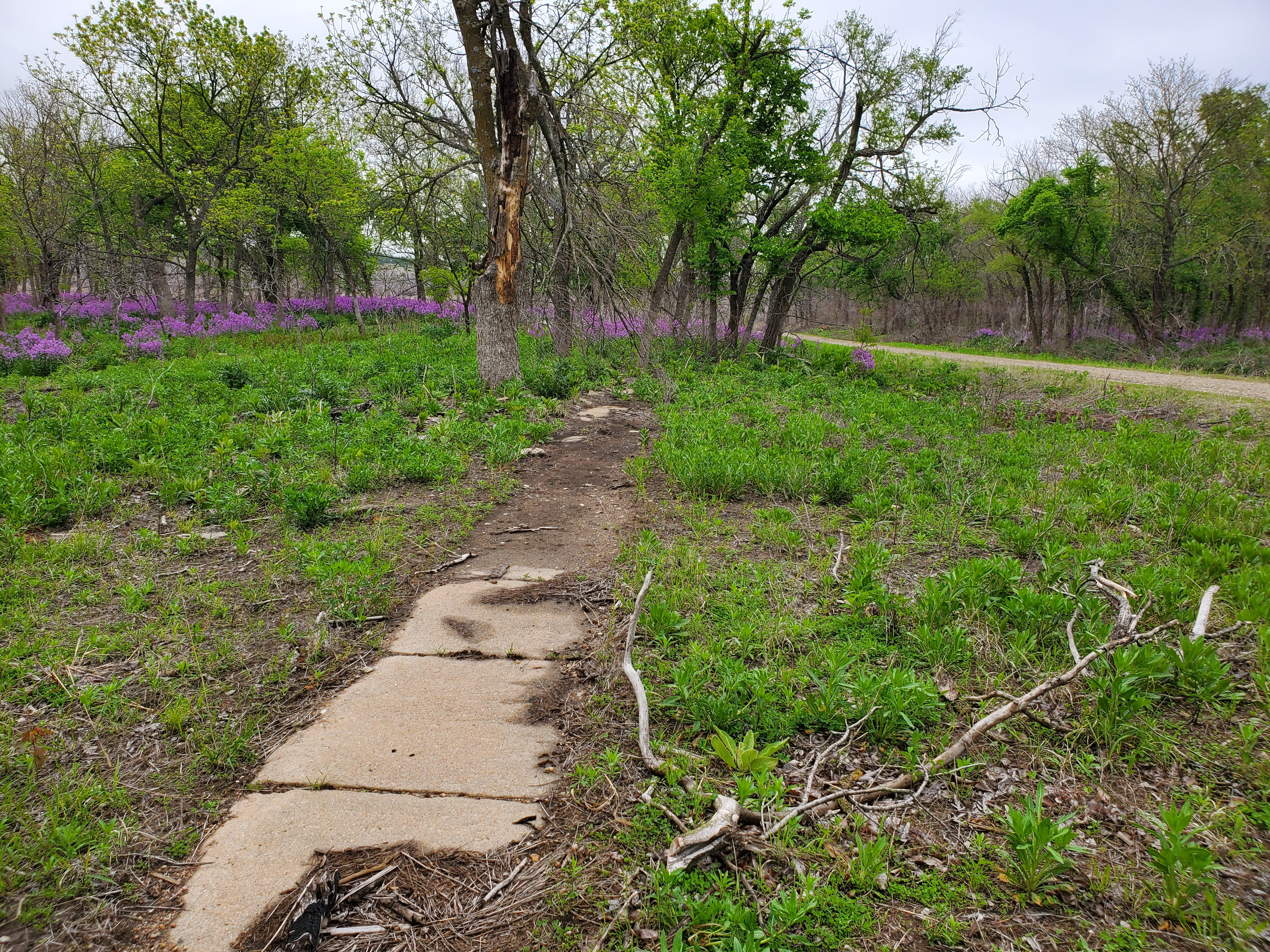
Abadonded sidewalk

== Education ==
The first schoolhouse was built in 1868 but was destroyed in 1879. The stone school was replaced by a frame one the same year.

Established around 1864, the Wetmore Institute was built on a slope overlooking the town and named for A.H. Wetmore. The limestone building was partially destroyed by the 1879 tornadoes and burned down in 1880.

== Notable people ==
- Ruth Alexander (1905–1930) - Female aviation pioneer.

== See also ==
- Central Branch Union Pacific Railroad
- Dorothy Gale, fictional character in Wizard of Oz film
