= Tomten, jag vill ha en riktig jul =

Single by Busungarna

from the album Tjena, vi är Busungarna
- A-side: "Tomten, jag vill ha en riktig jul"
- B-side: "Skvallerbytta bing bång"
- Released: 1982
- Songwriter: Kenneth Fridén

Busungarna singles chronology
"Tomten, jag vill ha en riktig jul" (1982)	"Äntligen sommarlov" (1984)

"Tomten, jag vill ha en riktig jul" (transl. "Santa Claus, I Want a Proper Christmas") is a Christmas song written by Kenneth Fridén, and recorded by Busungarna in 1982. Released as a single, it peaked at 11th position at the Swedish singles chart, It also appeared at the 1984 Busungarna album Tjena, vi är Busungarna.

The song describes Christmas with children asking for presents by Santa Claus, including a radio-controlled aeroplane, a pinball game, Donkey Kong, typical for the 1980s, and a table soccer set.

In 1991, Werner & Werner recorded a parody of the song with new lyrics "Tomten du är så otroligt ful" ("Santa, you look so incredible ugly").

In 1997, the song was recorded by Håbo Music School on the EP Flingor som singlar.

In 1998 the song was recorded by Drängarna & Smådrängarna on the album En skitkul jul.

In 2002, the a recording by girl duo Peaches appeared on a Christmas EP. with a video.

In 2008, the song was recorded by Sonja Aldén, Shirley Clamp och Sanna Nielsen during their Christmas show, with new lyrics.

== Charts ==
Chart (1983)	Peak position
Sweden (Sverigetopplistan)	11
