= Ryan Airline Company =

American airline

IATA	ICAO	Call sign
-	-	-
- Founded: April 19, 1925; 101 years ago
- Commenced operations: 1925; 101 years ago
- Ceased operations: 1926; 100 years ago
- Destinations: San Diego and Los Angeles, California
- Headquarters: San Diego California, United States
- Key people: T. Claude Ryan B. F. "Frank" Mahoney

Ryan Airline Company was an American airline founded by T. Claude Ryan and Benjamin Franklin "Frank" Mahoney at Dutch Flats Airport in San Diego, California, on April 19, 1925. On March 1, 1925, they had established a scheduled air service between San Diego and Los Angeles, California — Los Angeles-San Diego Air Line, the first scheduled passenger air service operated wholly over the contiguous United States and throughout the year — with a fare of $14.50 one-way and $22.50 round-trip.

== Operations ==
Service was provided by a Standard J-1, a World War I training aircraft (not widely liked by pilots) that they modified with a four-passenger closed cabin in the forward front cockpit area. The company also bought and modified the Douglas Cloudster (a portmanteau of cloud duster) from Donald Douglas. They designed the Ryan M-1 for mail and passenger service, building the first of these in the fall of 1925 and 22 more within a year. When orders fell, Ryan and Mahoney ended the partnership in November 1926. Mahoney bought out Ryan's interest but kept using the name for several months.

Some of the airline's plane manufacturing was done under the name Ryan Aeronautical Company, which under Mahoney built the NYP monoplane for Charles Lindbergh, but this was not the business that later became Teledyne Ryan Aeronautical. Lindbergh claimed that the name of the company he was dealing with was Ryan Airlines, Incorporated. In July 1927, shortly after Lindbergh's successful flight in the Spirit of St. Louis, the name of that business was changed to B. F. Mahoney Aircraft Corporation.

== See also ==
- List of defunct airlines of the United States
