= Peach (surname) =

Peach is a surname. Notable people with the name include:

- Andrew Peach, British broadcaster
- Alan Peach (1890–1961), English cricketer
- Arthur Wallace Peach (1886–1956), American poet and academic
- Ben Peach (1842–1926), British geologist and Charles William Peach's son
- Bill Peach (1935–2013), Australian television journalist
- Billy Peach (born 1990), Canadian football player
- Bob Peach (born 1937), English cricketer
- Calvin Peach (born 1953), Canadian politician
- Ceri Peach (1939–2018), Welsh geographer
- Charles William Peach (1800–1886), British naturalist and geologist
- Charlie Peach (1900–1977), English cricketer
- Daryl Peach (born 1972), English pocket billiards player
- David Peach (born 1951), English footballer
- Diana Clifton-Peach (born 1944), British figure skater
- Dianne Peach (born 1939), British figure skater
- Frederick Peach (1882–1965), English cricketer
- Greg Peach (born 1986), American football player
- Harry Peach (1874–1936), British furniture manufacturer and social campaigner
- James Peach (born 1997), English squash player
- John Peach-Hungerford (c.1719–1809), British politician
- Isaac Peach (born 1982), New Zealand boxer and coach
- Kenneth Peach (1903–1988), American cinematographer
- L. du Garde Peach (1890–1974), English author and playwright
- Len Peach (1932–2016), British businessman and public servant
- M. Aloysius Peach (1892–1980), American Ursuline nun and poet
- Mark Peach, American football coach
- Mary Peach (1934–2025), British actress
- Milton Peach (born 1943), Canadian politician
- Nathaniel William Peach (1785–1835), English politician
- Norm Peach, American bassist
- Norman Peach (1889–1974), Australian tennis player
- Richard Peach (1949–2008), Australian news anchor
- Robert Peach (1920–1971), American airline executive
- Robert Westly Peach (1863–1936), American Reformed Episcopal bishop and hymnologist
- Samuel Peach (1725–1790), English merchant and politician
- Sinead Peach (born 1998), British rugby league footballer
- Stuart Peach (born 1956), RAF Officer
- Terry Peach (1950–2022), American farmer and politician
- Timothy Peach (born 1963), British-German actor
- Vince Peach, Australian DJ and radio presenter
- Wildri Peach (born 1982), South African politician
- William Peach (1875–1959), English cricketer

== See also ==
- Death of Blair Peach, 1979
- Peach Lover, Thai television series
