= Tjena, vi är Busungarna =

Studio album by Busungarna
- Released: December 1984
- Recorded: Polar Music Studio, Stockholm, Sweden 1983-1984
- Genre: pop
- Label: Polar
- Producer: Johan Folkesson

Tjena, vi är Busungarna was released in December 1984, and is a studio album by Busungarna. The album consists of something as uncommon as Christmas songs on an album that's not a strictly Christmas album. The theme of changing seasons returns with the final track "Äntligen sommarlov.

== Track listing ==
=== Side A ===
1. Tjena, vi är Busungarna
2. Jag ska bli rockstjärna när jag blir stor
3. Doktor Pop presenterar Busungarnas rockfavoriter
  1. Be-Bop-A-Lula
  2. Cadillac
  3. Do You Wanna Dance?
4. Vi vill ha fred
5. Busvitsar

=== Side B ===
1. Tomten, jag vill ha en riktig jul
2. Julbus runt granen
  1. Hej tomtegubbar
  2. Nu har vi ljus här i vårt hus (Julpolska)
  3. Nu är det jul igen
3. Busvitsar, part 2
4. Jag ska rymma
5. Doktor Pop tackar
6. Äntligen sommarlov
