= Maxine Dunlap Bennett =

First licensed woman glider pilot in the U.S.

Maxine Dunlap Bennett (January 26, 1908 – c. September 1977), was an American aviator. She was the first licensed woman glider pilot and first woman glider club president in the United States. She flew her record-setting glider rating qualification flight over the sand dunes of Ocean Beach, San Francisco, California, on April 28, 1929, for a distance of 990 ft (300 m) and a flight duration of 50 seconds, exceeding the then-required minimum of 30 seconds, to obtain her Glider flying certificate.

== Life and career ==
Maxine Dunlap was born in 1908 in Pleasanton, California, the daughter of Henry H. and Catherine M. Dunlap (née Langan). She grew up in Oakland, California, and attended the University of California. (Note: Dunlap's brief bio in the Charlotte Observer of February 26, 1939 (p. 70), mentions that she "attended the University of California" without elaborating on the specific campus) The February 1939 Charlotte Observer writes that Dunlap became "smitten with lindberghitis" in 1927; (Note: For reference, Charles Lindbergh's well-publicized solo New York-to-Paris flight took place in May 1927) she earned her power flying certificate (number 5894) in 1928 as the first woman in San Francisco to earn a pilot's license.

After accumulating over 60 hours of power flying time she began taking gliding lessons, and three weeks later attained her glider rating, U.S. Department of Commerce glider certificate number 8. The San Francisco Examiner of April 29, 1929 notes that Dunlap's glider qualification flight made her the first woman in the US to receive a glider pilot's license. Furthermore, her flight's duration of 50 seconds "far exceeded the record of 17 seconds flight formerly held by Amelia Earhart, the Atlantic flyer. Miss Earhart was unable to remain aloft for the requisite 30 seconds to qualify for a license."

In March 1930 she became the first woman glider club president in the U.S. after being appointed by the National Glider Association as president of the Bay Region California Gliding Club. She joined the newly-founded Ninety Nines in 1930 and participated in many air races. In 1935 she set the women world speed record for light airplanes in Tulsa, Oklahoma. (Note: Weight class under 450 lbs, speed achieved 76.799)

== Personal life ==
Dunlap married her original flight instructor, Donald A. Templeman (1902–1942), in 1929; they divorced in 1933. In October 1934 she married Joseph J. Bennett Jr. (1901–1975), a Coca-Cola executive and former All American ('23, '24) University of Georgia tackle, and moved to Atlanta, Georgia. According to the February 1939 Charlotte Observer, she "did all the flying in the family" in a 260-horsepower Gull Wing Stinson, flying so well that "even her husband flys[sic] with her anywhere at any time."

On October 23, 1975, Joseph Bennett died in Oakland, California, aged 74. The obituary notice in the Atlanta Constitution mentions Maxine as his surviving widow, alongside his brother and sister. (Note: Maxine was approximately 67 years old at the time of Joseph's death. There is no mention in the obituary of any additional family members)

== See also ==
- Peaches Wallace – second licensed woman glider pilot in the U.S.
