= Peach (disambiguation) =

Peach is a tree, and the fruit produced by that tree.

Peach may also refer to:

== People ==
- Peach PRC, an Australian pop singer
- Peach (singer), an American blues and jazz artist
- Peach (surname), including a list of people with the surname

== Arts, entertainment, and media ==
=== Music ===
==== Groups ====
- Peach (band), a British metal band 1991–1994
- Peach (pop band), a British band 1995–1998

==== Songs ====
- "Peach" (IU song), a song by South Korean singer-songwriter and actress IU
- "Peach" (Prince song), by Prince, 1993
- "Peach", a song on "Peach/Heart", a 2007 double A-sided single by Ai Otsuka
- "Peach", a 2026 song on Angel by Lizzy McAlpine
- *"Peach!!", the A-side single on "Peach!!/Heart of Xmas", a single from Masaharu Fukuyama

=== Other uses in arts, entertainment, and media ===
- Princess Peach, a character in Nintendo's Mario franchise
- 10 Peach, an Australian television channel
- Peach, a starfish in the Finding Nemo franchise
- Big Buck Bunny (code named "Project Peach"), an open content short film by the Blender Foundation
- Peach Landis, a recurring character in the U.S. TV series 2 Broke Girls

== Other uses ==
- Peach (color), the pale pinkish-orange color of the fruit of the Peach tree
- Peach (social network), a social network
- Peach Air, former airline in the United Kingdom
- Peach Aviation, a low-cost airline based in Japan
- Peach County, Georgia, a county in the United States
- Pan-European Automated Clearing House, or PEACH

== See also ==
- Impeachment, a process in which an official is accused of unlawful activity
- Peaches (disambiguation)
- Pietsch, a surname
