= Busungarna =

- Origin: Sweden
- Genres: pop
- Years active: 1982-1985
- Labels: Septima

Busungarna was a Swedish early-mid 1980s pop group, consisting of Rickard Gunnarsson, Patrick Tokarski, Carl Westerberg and Malcolm Murrey. They scored a 1982 success with the Christmas song Tomten, jag vill ha en riktig jul.

== Discography ==
=== Albums ===
- Tjena, vi är Busungarna - 1984

=== Singles ===
- Tomten, jag vill ha en riktig jul/Skvallerbytta bing bång - 1982
- Äntligen sommarlov/Busvitsar del 2 - 1984
- Vi vill ha fred/Julbus runt granen - 1985
