= Dutch Flats Airport =

Former airport in San Diego, California, U.S.

Dutch Flats Airport Ryan Airport
- IATA: none; ICAO: none

Summary
- Owner/Operator: T. Claude Ryan, Benjamin Franklin Mahoney
- Built: 1923
- In use: early 1940s
- Occupants: Ryan Airline Company
- Coordinates: 32°44′45″N 117°12′20″W

Map
- Dutch Flats Airport, California Dutch Flats Airport (the United States)

Dutch Flats Airport was an airport in the Midway area, a neighborhood of San Diego, California. It is located at the northern (mainland) end of the Point Loma peninsula, northwest of downtown San Diego and just west of Old Town. Other names include: Ryan Airport, Mahoney Airport, and Speer Airport.

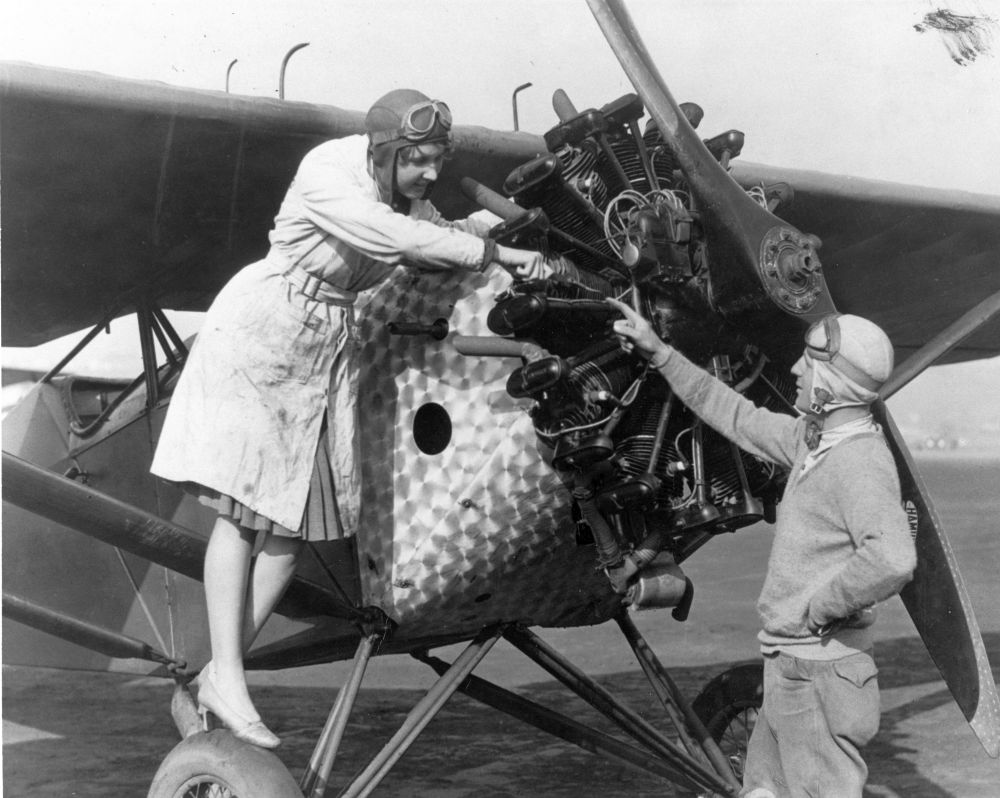
Ryan M-1 at Ryan Field with Peaches Wallace and pilot Jerry Jones

In 1923, T. Claude Ryan moved his business Ryan Airline Company to an area of Dutch Flats adjoining the Marine Corps Recruit Depot, located near what are now Midway and Barnett streets. A hangar, a small office building and grass airstrip were constructed. He hired a full-time mechanic and offered free plane parking to other pilots, the ensuing success allowed the business to develop into a larger airport and flight training school. Ryan took on a partner, Benjamin Franklin Mahoney, and on 1 March 1925, they started the first year-round, regularly scheduled passenger airline, the Los Angeles – San Diego Air Line, which continued for about a year and a half.

Dutch Flats Airport became famous when Ryan built a specially designed aircraft for Charles A. Lindbergh. After completion at the adjoining Ryan factory, Charles A. Lindbergh made the first flight of his Spirit of St. Louis airplane, constructed in 60 days by Ryan Airlines. The 20-minute flight took place on 28 April 1927. Lindbergh describes the flight:

This morning I’m going to test the Spirit of St. Louis. It’s the 28th of April (1927)—just over two months since I placed our order with the Ryan Company, and exactly sixty days since business formalities were completed and work on the plane began. What a beautiful machine it is, resting there on the field in front of the hanger, trim and slender, gleaming in its silver coat! All our ideas, all our calculations, all our hopes lie there before me, waiting to undergo the acid test of flight. For me it seems to contain the whole future of aviation.

In 1929, the editor of the San Diego Sun announced a contest to encourage women's participation in aviation – the winner of the “Miss Air Capital of the West” contest would receive a free full course of instruction at the Ryan Flying School at a (1929) value of about $1,300. The contest consisted of a series of tests to determine the greatest advance over a period of time in the study and practice of aviation. When the judges made their final decision, Peaches Wallace placed first with a score of 85.48. The flying instructions began on September 3, 1929, at Ryan Airport (Dutch Flats). In 1929, pioneer aviator Ruth Alexander, a graduate of the Ryan Flying School, established a new world record for women in light aircraft on a flight from Dutch Flats Airport. A post office now located on the site contains several historic plaques commemorating Dutch Flats and Lindbergh.

In the early 1940s, the name of the Dutch Flats Airport was changed to the Speers Airport. The airport was not used during WWII, and the government later converted the land to military housing facilities.
