= Momoko =

- Pronunciation: Moh-MOH-koh
- Gender: Female

Origin
- Origin: Japanese
- Meaning: 桃 peach, 百 one hundred, 杏 apricot combined with 子 child but it can have different meanings depending on the kanji (all homonyms) that precede "child"
- Region of origin: Japan

Momoko (桃子, 百子, 杏子, ももこ, モモコ) is a Japanese name for girls. Momo is usually written with the kanji character 桃 for "peach" or 百 for "one hundred" or 杏 for "apricot", followed by -ko, a common suffix for girls' names (meaning "child"). It may refer to:

== People ==
- Momoko Abe (阿部 桃子; born 1994), Japanese actress and model
- Momoko Ando (安藤 桃子; born 1982), Japanese film director
- Momoko Hirata (平田 桃子; born 1985), Japanese ballerina
- Momoko Hirotsu (広津 桃子; 1918–1988), Japanese novelist
- Momoko Iko (1940–2020), American playwright
- Momoko Ishii (石井 桃子; 1907–2008), Japanese author and translator of children's books
- Momoko Ishikawa (石川 桃子), Japanese voice actress
- Momoko Katō (加藤 桃子; born 1993), Japanese women's shogi player
- Momoko Kikuchi (菊池 桃子; born 1968), Japanese actress
- Momoko Kobori (小堀 桃子; born 1998), Japanese tennis player
- Momoko Kōchi (河内 桃子; 1932–1998), Japanese actress best known for her role as Emiko Yamane in the original Godzilla
- Momoko Kuroda (黒田 杏子; born 1938), Japanese haiku poet
- Momoko Nakamura (中村 桃子; born 1987), Japanese women's professional shogi player
- Momoko Ohtani (大谷 桃子; born 1995), Japanese wheelchair tennis player
- Momoko Osato (大里 桃子; born 1998), Japanese professional golfer
- Momoko Saitō (斎藤 桃子; born 1982), Japanese voice actress from Hyogo, Japan
- Momoko Saito (cricketer) (born 1981), Japanese cricketer
- Momoko Sakura (さくら ももこ; 1965–2018), Japanese manga artist from Shimizu, Japan
- Momoko Sayama (左山 桃子; born 1992), Japanese footballer
- Momoko Shibuya (渋谷 桃子; born 1987), Japanese actress
- Momoko Shimizu (清水 萌々子; born 1997), Japanese actress
- Momoko Takahashi (高橋 萌木子; born 1988), Japanese track and field athlete
- Momoko Tanaka (田中 桃子; born 2000), Japanese footballer
- Momoko Tsugunaga (嗣永 桃子; born 1992), J-pop singer and member of the Hello! Project group Berryz Kobo
- Momoko Ueda (上田 桃子; born 1986), Japanese female professional golfer
- Peach Momoko (桃桃子), pseudonym of an Eisner Award-winning Japanese comic book artist and writer
- Momoko Okazaki (岡崎 百々子, Born 2003), Japanese musician, singer and dancer for Babymetal

== Fictional characters ==
- Momoko (Maskman) (aka Pink Mask), a character in Hikari Sentai Maskman
- Momoko (The King of Fighters), a character in The King of Fighters video game series
- Momoko, a character in Armour of God II: Operation Condor
- Momoko, a character in Momo Kyun Sword
- Momoko, a character in Shangri-La
- Momoko Akatsutsumi, a character in the Demashita! Powerpuff Girls Z anime series
- Momoko Asuka, a character in Ojamajo Doremi, but only in the third and fourth story arcs
- Momoko Hamanaka, a character in The Decay of the Angel
- Momoko Hasegawa, a character in Mop Girl
- Momoko Hoshino, a character in Major
- Momoko Ichihara, a character in Love Get Chu
- Momoko Kanda, a character in Wonder Momo
- Momoko Koigakubo, a character in Ghost Stories
- Momoko Koishikawa, a character in Long Vacation
- Momoko Kuzuryū, a character in Sumomomo Momomo
- Momoko Momohara, a character in Sailor Moon
- Momoko Momozono, a character in Godannar
- Momoko Naitō, a character in Shōjo Sect
- Momoko Ryugasaki, a character in the novel, manga and movie Kamikaze Girls
- Momoko Sakura (aka Maruko-chan), main character of the Japanese anime and manga series Chibi Maruko-chan
- Momoko Suō, a character in The Idolmaster Million Live!
- Momoko Takamachi, a character in Magical Girl Lyrical Nanoha
- Momoko Takeuchi, a character in the manga Inubaka
- Momoko Togame, a character in Magia Record
- Momoko, mentally and physically disabled twin sister of nine-year-old Rikki in 2003 animated movie My Sister Momoko
- Wedding Peach (character), also known as Momoko Hanasaki, a character in Wedding Peach
- Momoko Fujikawa, a character in Magical Princess Club
- Momoko Kuramoto, a character in My Sister Momoko
- Momoko Fuller, a character in All Over Creation
- Momoko Yamazaki, a character in The Brave Fighter of Sun Fighbird

== See also ==
- Momoko Doll, a Japanese fashion doll
- Momoko 120%, a 1986 NES game based on the anime Urusei Yatsura released only in Japan
