= Peaches Wallace =

American aviation pioneer

Sarah "Peaches" Wallace
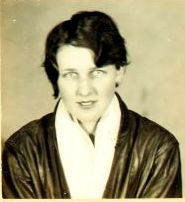
- Born: August 31, 1909; Oklahoma City, Oklahoma, US
- Died: June 22, 1930 (aged 20); San Diego, California, US
- Resting place: Glen Abbey Memorial Park
- Memorials: Peaches Wallace Field (named in her honor)

Sarah "Peaches" Wallace (August 31, 1909 – June 22, 1930) was an American aviator who was the second woman in the United States to obtain a glider license and held a record for time aloft in 1930. Wallace also wrote newspaper and magazine articles and made public appearances to discuss aviation and her experiences.

== Early life ==
Wallace was born in Oklahoma to Reid Wallace and Sallie A. Burge and lived there until the family relocated to San Diego in the early 1920s. Wallace was a tall, athletic girl who was called "Peaches" after her father's favorite racehorse.

In 1918, while still living in Oklahoma, eight-year-old Wallace was looking for four-leaf clovers beside a road, when a biplane made an emergency landing near her. The pilot, Billy Parker, asked Wallace, "Would you like to dare the heavens with me, my lady?" Wallace agreed and Parker strapped Wallace into the observer's seat. After tuning up his engine, Parker took off and circled the city. He then returned Wallace to her clover patch.

== Career ==
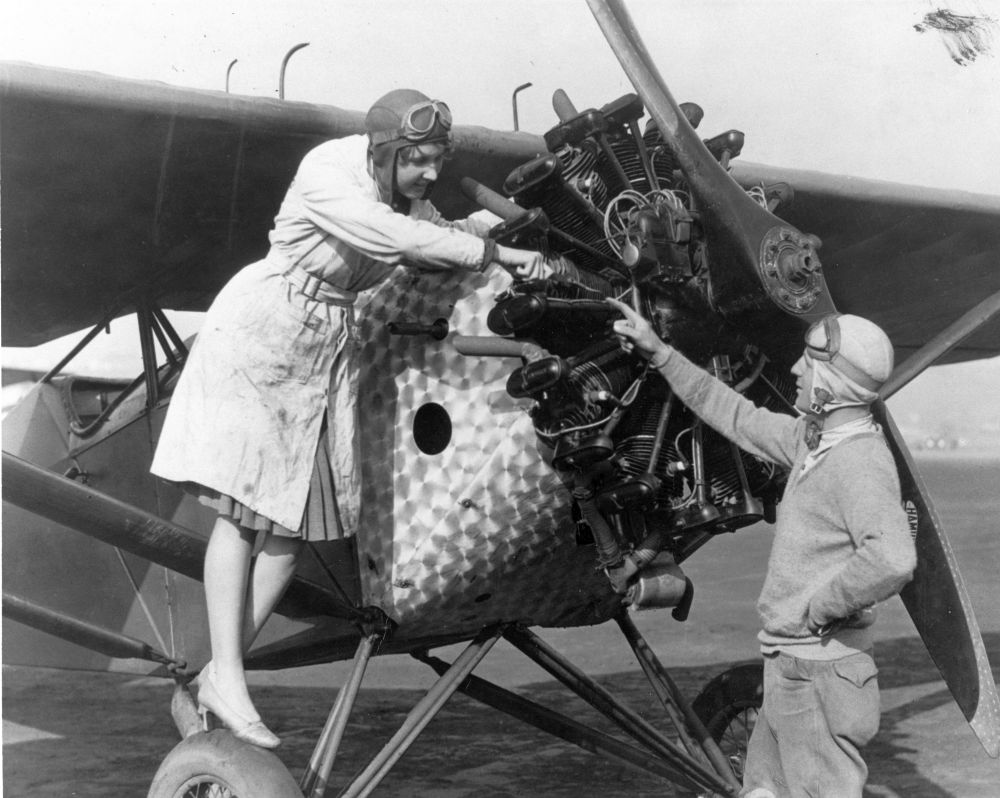
Peaches at Ryan School

In 1929, the editor of the San Diego Sun announced a contest to encourage women's participation in aviation – the winner of the "Miss Air Capital of the West" contest would receive a free full course of instruction at the T. Claude Ryan Flying School at a (1929) value of about $1,300. The contest consisted of a series of tests to determine the greatest advance over a period of time in the study and practice of aviation. Wallace entered the contest, and was one of ten finalists, (which included Ruth Alexander), but when the judges made their final decision, Wallace placed first with a score of 85.48. The flying instructions began on September 3, 1929, at Ryan Airport (Dutch Flats). Wallace reported her flight school activities regularly in the San Diego Sun. The Sun called her their "own 'newsgirl'". Wallace also wrote magazine articles and made public lectures about her training and aviation experiences.

Wallace was considered to be one of the most apt students to have taken the training course and within a few weeks of her first solo flight received her pilot's license.

=== Gliders ===
After the Treaty of Versailles banned powered aircraft in Germany, there was a great interest there in unpowered sailplanes. This interest soon spread to the United States. Influenced by Hawley Bowlus and, later, Charles and Anne Lindbergh, San Diego saw much interest in gliders. After Wallace completed her course and became a licensed pilot, she and several other female fliers became interested in this new sport of glider flying.

Wallace received glider training from Forrest Hieatt, under the supervision of Hawley Bowlus, at the nearby Bowlus Gliding School at Lindbergh Field, and on January 26, 1930, after only three hours of training, Wallace achieved a 36-second solo flight to qualify for a glider pilot license. This was a third-class license, but she soon added second- and first-class licenses. Wallace made this achievement before her teacher; Wallace received US license number 42, while Hieatt received number 47 shortly thereafter.

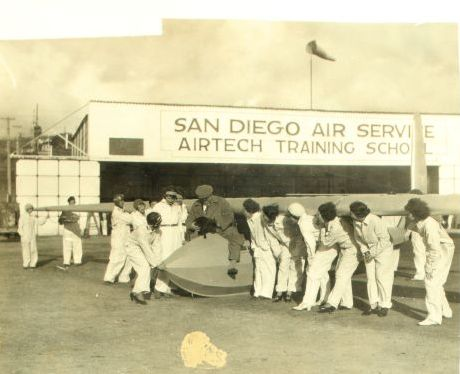
Glider training

It was reported at the time that Wallace was the first American female to be granted a glider license. However, another pilot, Maxine Dunlap, had obtained a third-class license in April 1929.

Wallace set a women's record for time in the air in a glider of 25 minutes. This record held for over a year, being broken in August 1931.

Inspired by Anne Morrow Lindbergh, the first American woman to receive a first-class glider license (days after Wallace's first solo flight), Wallace formed the inaugural women's glider club in the West, the Anne Lindbergh Flyers Club of San Diego. The club elected Lindbergh the honorary president.

== Death ==
On March 27, 1930, Wallace was making a routine glider flight in a Bowlus-built glider. After about nine minutes aloft, she was attempting to land when her glider struck a bar on a telephone pole on Point Loma and crashed. Wallace claimed to be uninjured, though her back struck a sidewalk curbing when the sailplane fell into a street. Although she suffered some discomfort with her back, the following week she appeared at each scheduled performance at the RKO-Orpheum theater and gave talks on aviation and gliding.

On April 18, Wallace was admitted to Mercy Hospital and diagnosed with appendicitis. Her family stated that her condition "was not due entirely to the crash in the glider, but may have been superinduced by the fall." She seemed to be on the road to recovery when infection set in, which led to further serious operations. After five major operations and blood transfusions, Wallace died June 22, 1930. She was laid to rest June 24 in Glen Abbey Memorial Park. The funeral services were attended by around 300, including a large number of prominent San Diegans.

After her death, on July 27, 1930, California's first glider port was opened in San Diego, and dedicated to Wallace. Ruth Alexander flew over the field and dropped wreaths of roses in memory of Peaches. San Diego Mayor, Harry C. Clark, spoke, paying high tribute to Wallace. Peaches Wallace Field has today been lost to development in San Diego.
