= Mark Peach =

American football coach

Coaching career (HC unless noted)
- 2003–2004: Campbellsville
- 2005–2019: Anderson County HS (KY)
- 2020: Trigg County HS (KY)
- 2021–2022: Danville HS (KY)

Head coaching record
- Overall: 15–7 (college)

Mark Peach is an American former football coach. He was the second head football coach at Campbellsville University, serving from 2003 to 2004 and compiling a record of 15–7.

== Head coaching record ==
=== College ===
Year	Team	Overall	Conference	Standing	Bowl/playoffs
Campbellsville Tigers (Mid-South Conference) (2003–2004)
2003	Campbellsville	9–2	7–2	T–3rd	
2004	Campbellsville	6–5	5–5	T–5th	
Campbellsville:		15–7	12–7		
Total:		15–7			
