= Peaches and cream (disambiguation) =

Peaches and cream is a dessert made with peaches and cream.

Peaches and cream may also refer to:

== Plants ==
- Peaches & Cream, a variety of sweet corn

== Arts, entertainment, and media ==
=== Music ===
==== Albums ====
- Peaches and Cream, an album of dances and marches by John Philip Sousa, by Erich Kunzel Cincinnati Pops Orchestra 1984

==== Compositions and songs ====
- "Peaches and Cream", a ragtime composition by Percy Wenrich 1905
- "Peaches and Cream", a comedy duet in Bowery tough dialect by Ada Jones and Len Spencer, wax cylinder 1906
- "Peaches and Cream", a fox trot composition by John Philip Sousa 1924
- "Peaches & Cream" (112 song)
- "Peaches & Cream", a song by Beck from Midnite Vultures
- "Peaches & Cream", a song by Bone Crusher from AttenCHUN!
- "Peaches & Cream", a song by The John Butler Trio from Sunrise over Sea
- "Peaches & Cream", a song written and recorded by Larry Williams; also recorded by the Ikettes in 1965
- "Peaches N Cream" (Snoop Dogg song)
- "Peaches 'N' Cream", a song by Mark O'Connor from Soppin' the Gravy
- "Peaches N' Cream", a song by Supercharge from 1980
- "Peaches 'N' Cream", a song by The Ikettes from 1965
- "My Peaches and Cream", a song by Jerome Kern from the musical The Red Petticoat 1912
