= Romanus Nadolney =

American football player (1899–1963)

Profile
- Position: Guard / Tackle

Personal information
- Born: May 23, 1899; Ironwood, Michigan
- Died: February 21, 1963 (aged 63); Houston, Texas
- Listed height: 5 ft 11 in (1.80 m)
- Listed weight: 211 lb (96 kg)

Career information
- High school: Ironwood (MI)
- College: Notre Dame

Career history
- Green Bay Packers (1922); Milwaukee Badgers (1923–1925)
- Stats at Pro Football Reference

Romanus Frank Nadolney (May 23, 1899 – February 21, 1963), also known as Peaches Nadolney, was a player in the National Football League for the Green Bay Packers and Milwaukee Badgers from 1922 to 1925 as a guard and tackle. He played at the collegiate level at the University of Notre Dame.

== Biography ==
Nadolney was born Romanus Frank Nadolney on May 23, 1899, in Ironwood, Michigan. He died in Houston, Texas on February 21, 1963.
