= Peaches (duo) =

Swedish child singers

Peaches was a Swedish child duo that was active from 2000 to 2005.

Peaches were formed when two girls met at an audition. Tåve Wanning (born 23 March 1992) was eight years old when the duo started and Isabelle Erkendal (born 23 June 1989) was eleven. Isabelle had a background in singing, having recorded a single previously. Tåve was a dancer, having placed 1st in a national competition. They managed to get a record company and found a producer and songwriters and worked with Johan Fjellström from Empire Music Production.

Their first single "Rosa helikopter" (lit. "Pink Helicopter") was a success, achieving gold status in Sweden and platinum in Norway. They later released more singles but they weren't as successful. From 2005 on the duo has been on a break, and both girls have pursued their own careers. Erkendal became one half of the duo West End Girls, a pop group which covers songs by the Pet Shop Boys, while Wanning is now a solo singer.

At The Gathering 2012: At the End of the Universe the duo celebrated a reunion.

== Discography ==
- "Rosa helikopter" (2001)
- "Tomten jag vill ha en riktig jul" (2002)
- "Fritt fall" (2003)
- "Daddy Cool" (2004)

== Track listing ==
=== "Rosa helikopter" (29 October 2001) ===
1. "Skateboard"
2. "Stockholm"
3. "Rosa helikopter"
4. "Rymdraket"
5. "Jag ser dej"
6. "Vi kommer loss"
7. "Vi rymmer bara du och jag"
8. "Dansa nu"
9. "Hallå hallå"
10. "Jag vill inte gå hit"
11. "Vi två"
12. "Vi går på disco"

=== "Tomten jag vill ha en riktig jul" EP (November 2002) ===
1. "Tomten, jag vill ha en riktig jul"
2. "Kul i jul"
3. "Jag såg mamma kyssa tomten"
4. "Tomten kommer snart"
5. "Rosa helikopter (Julmix)"

=== "Fritt fall" (23 May 2003) ===
1. "Sköna gröna sommartid"
2. "Dynamit nitroglycerin baby"
3. "Dra till magaluf"
4. "Roller Boy"
5. "Dumbom"
6. "Hokey Pokey"
7. "Pappa har sitt jobb"
8. "Peachmobile"
9. "Följ med mig ut"
10. "Indian Dance"
11. "Ut i natten"
