= Ruth Alexander =

American female aviation pioneer

Ruth Blaney Alexander
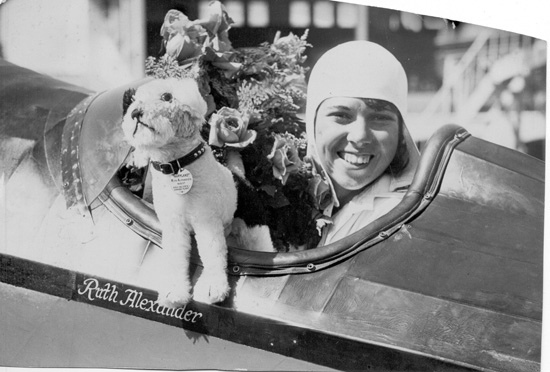
- Born: Ruth Blaney Alexander; May 18, 1905; Irving, Kansas, U.S.
- Died: September 18, 1930 (aged 25); San Diego, California, U.S.
- Known for: Establishment of world and national records in altitude and distance
- Aviation career
- Flight license: November 17, 1929; San Diego, California

Ruth Blaney Alexander (May 18, 1905 – September 18, 1930) was an early American female pilot who set several records in altitude and distance in 1929 and 1930.

== Youth ==
Ruth Blaney was raised in Irving, Kansas, in Marshall County, by parents William T. and Lillian F. Blaney. She had a natural interest in mechanics and assisted her father who ran a hardware store. Her first flight in an airplane occurred on July 4, 1920, when she took a ride with a local barnstormer at the age of 15. Searching for her career path, she worked at a general store and at a beauty parlor near Kansas City.

She married briefly in 1925 but the marriage was annulled soon afterwards. On June 16, 1925, she married Mac P. Alexander, a farmer from Olathe, Kansas. They lived together for two years, but separated due to irreconcilable differences.

In roughly 1927, she fell from a horse, breaking her shoulder, several ribs, and several fingers. During her recovery, she nearly died from pneumonia but surprised her doctors by making a full recovery. After this, she divorced Mac Alexander, and moved to San Diego, California, to pursue aviation. At the time, San Diego went by the nickname "Air Capital of the West."

== Flight school ==
Arriving in San Diego, Alexander worked as a beautician to save up sufficient funds for flight school. However, at precisely the same time, the editor of the local San Diego Sun newspaper announced a contest to encourage women's participation in aviation – the winner of the "Miss Air Capital of the West" contest would receive a free full course of instruction at the Ryan Flying School (normally costing $1,375, roughly $26,000 in 2025 dollars). She entered the contest along with approximately 60 other women and was one of the ten finalists, but did not finish in the top three. A 19-year-old San Diegan named Peaches Wallace placed first. However, Alexander was undaunted; she determined that she had saved enough to pay for her tuition and enrolled at the school. These activities were reported regularly in the San Diego Sun.

Her instruction began on September 9, 1929, at Ryan Field (Dutch Flats), the same airport from which Charles Lindbergh started his journey in the Spirit of St. Louis in 1927. Alexander made her first solo flight on October 25, and completed her training on November 11, the first Kansan to graduate from the Ryan school. On November 17, she became the 65th licensed woman pilot in the US, also obtaining her FAI license the same day.

== World record for altitude ==
Less than 24 hours after attaining her license, Alexander took off from Ryan Field on November 18 in a Great Lakes biplane and continued climbing to what she believed was an altitude of better than 18,000 feet (5,500 m) over the skies of San Diego. This was later recognized as a new official world record altitude for women in light planes of 15,718 feet (4,791 m), generating considerable fame not only for herself but also for San Diego and the Ryan Flying School. She was hailed as a local hero and honored with a special banquet by the San Diego Chamber of Commerce on November 22, and met with Mayor Harry C. Clark. In December, she was flown on a special flight to Oakland, California, for a special lunch in her honor with Amelia Earhart. After the lunch, Alexander was flown in a Ford Trimotor around the Bay area and offered the chance to pilot the aircraft, reportedly becoming the third woman in the US to do so.

== Gliding ==
After witnessing the gliding instruction of William Hawley Bowlus at Lindbergh Field in primary gliders, Alexander expressed an interest in becoming the first woman in the US to earn a glider license. However, shortly thereafter, Anne Morrow Lindbergh visited San Diego and took instruction from Bowlus, becoming the first woman to receive a first-class glider license in the US. On February 16, 1930, Alexander qualified for a US second-class glider license from the slopes of Mount Soledad, near La Jolla, California. Using a primary glider, Alexander made a perfect flight lasting 2 minutes 33 2/5 seconds. In the spring of 1930, she became a glider instructor and, in so doing, became the first woman in the US to hold this position. She was a charter member of the Anne Lindbergh Gliders Club of San Diego and joined the Ninety-Nines organization of women pilots.

== Commercial pilot's license ==
In March 1930, Alexander was granted a commercial pilot's license. Given her growing national fame, a contingent from Kansas travelled to California to meet her, including Kansas Governor Clyde M. Reed; other politicians; and Fred Trigg, the editor of the Kansas City Star. Alexander's first official passenger was Governor Reed on a flight from Ryan Field.

== Another world record for altitude ==
On July 4, 1930, Alexander flew a Nicholas-Beazley NB-3 (Barling NB-3) light aircraft (serial number 52, U.S. Department of Commerce registration number 880M) to 21,000 feet (6,400 m), though this was not confirmed as an official record owing to problems with the official barograph. Her altitude had exceeded the rating for the barograph drum. On July 11, 1930, Alexander took off at 1:34 p.m. in the same Barling from Lindbergh Field. After briefly losing consciousness at extreme altitudes despite using an oxygen tube, she established a new world record for light planes (for both men and women) of 26,600 feet (8,100 m). The previous American record had been set by D. S. Zimmerly (male) at an altitude of 24,074 feet (7,338 m) over St. Louis, Missouri, on February 16, 1930. Later in July, she became the first woman in the US to become an air deputy.

== Three flags flights ==
In July 1930, Alexander proposed to fly from Mexico to Canada via the U.S. – a "three flags flight" along the west coast air route. Tex Rankin had established a speed record over this route, and she wanted to break it. In addition, Alexander looked to become the first woman to make a round-trip flight from Canada to Mexico, and the first woman to fly from Canada to Mexico non-stop. Her northbound route started on August 27, 1930, from Agua Caliente, Tijuana, Mexico, to San Diego and then Los Angeles. On August 28, she continued from Los Angeles to Oakland, then Portland. On August 29, she completed the northbound leg to Seattle before finally landing at Vancouver (Lulu Island).

The return leg on August 31 started at roughly 3:20 a.m. from Vancouver and concluded back at Agua Caliente at 7:15 p.m. for a total flight time of 15 hours, 54 minutes, 30 seconds. The 1,460-mile (2,350 km) journey was flown at an average speed of 91.25 miles per hour (146.85 km/h), which was the fastest time by a woman on the route but not faster than Rankin's 14 hours and 37 minutes. The flight earned NAA records for distance over a specified air route by a woman, and a speed record over the course by a woman.

== Journey home and death ==
In September 1930, Alexander wrote to her parents in Irving that she was planning to fly from San Diego to Wichita, Kansas, continuing from there to New York City, with return stops at various cities on the east coast before returning to San Diego in October. Arrangements were made for her to meet the Lindberghs and the mayor of New York upon her arrival. Given the flight was sponsored by the Agua Caliente Company, the flight originated at the Agua Caliente Race Track before continuing to Lindbergh Field and then east to Wichita. Her takeoff from Agua Caliente at 1:05 a.m. on September 18 was uneventful, leading to a landing at Lindbergh Field shortly thereafter. Topped off with fuel, she once again took off at 3:28 a.m. from Lindbergh Field, but she entered low clouds and fog, is believed to have tip stalled, and crashed at Plumosa Park in Loma Portal, San Diego just west of the airport. The crash was at such a high speed that she died instantly upon impact. Her death made local, national, and international news. She was eulogized as a "pioneer of the airways of this epic age". She was buried at Greenwood Cemetery in Blue Rapids, Kansas.

During her aviation career, Ruth Alexander flew biplanes, monoplanes, transport aircraft, gliders, and even a Goodyear blimp.

== General references ==
- Carlson, D (1978) "Women in San Diego...a History in Photographs" The Journal of San Diego History, Vo. XXIV, No. 3.
- Fogel, Gary (2001) "Wind and Wings: The History of Soaring in San Diego" RockReef Press, San Diego, California.
- Fogel, Gary and Lindemer, Grant (2007) "Ruth Blaney Alexander: A Dream of Wings" Quiet Flyer, Vol. No. 8, pp. 22–27.
- Fogel, Gary (2019) "Ruth Blaney Alexander" AIAA SciTech 2019 Forum, San Diego, AIAA-2019-0122.
