= T. Claude Ryan =

American aviator

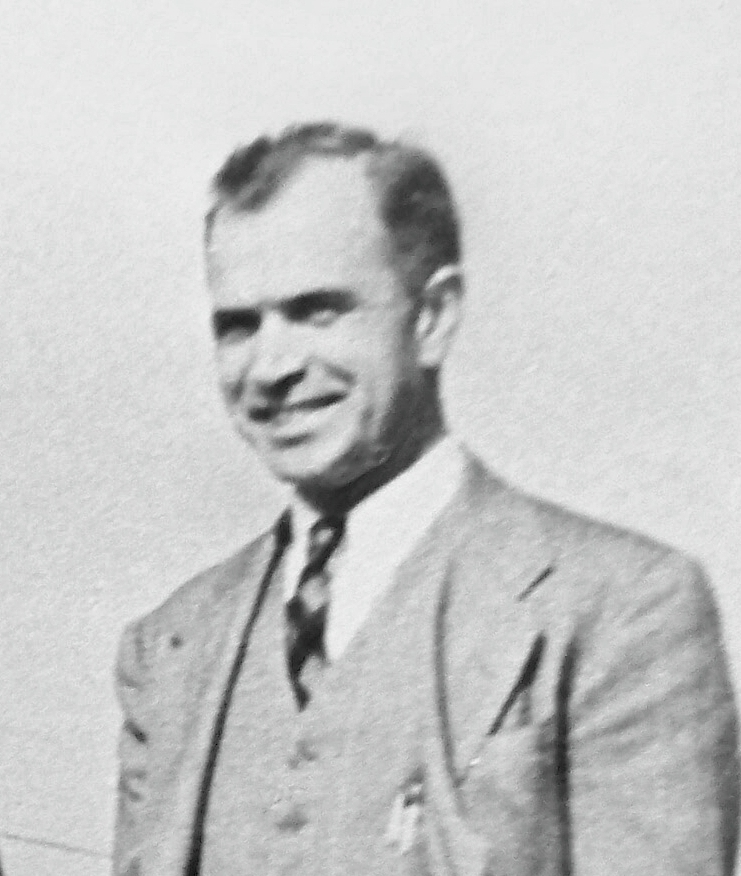
- Born: January 3, 1898; Parsons, Kansas, US
- Died: September 11, 1982 (aged 84)
- Occupations: Aviator, aerospace engineer

Tubal Claude Ryan (January 3, 1898 – September 11, 1982) was an American aviator born in Parsons, Kansas. Ryan was best known for founding several airlines and aviation factories.

== Early years ==
Ryan began his flying career in 1917 when he enrolled in the American School of Aviation in Venice, California. After making his first solo flight, he was accepted into the Army Air Service with an under-age waiver. The day that he was to report, the armistice was signed, ending his prospects for a military flying career. Instead, Ryan went to Oregon State College and studied mechanical engineering, then was accepted into the Aeronautical Division of the U.S. Army (later known as the United States Army Air Corps). While in the Army, Ryan learned to fly at March Field, California, from where he graduated in 1921.

Ryan flew forestry patrol duty in northern California and Oregon until 1922, when he formed the Ryan Flying Company. His flying service operated in San Diego using a Curtiss JN-4 Jenny for joy-rides, flight instruction and charter trips. In March 1925, Ryan Airlines, Inc. started flying passengers on round trip flights between San Diego and Los Angeles. Working with Hawley Bowlus, Ryan converted six government surplus Standard J-1 biplanes into Ryan-Standards. Capable of carrying four passengers in a forward cabin, they were powered by a 150-hp Hispano-Suiza.

== Business career ==
=== Beginnings ===
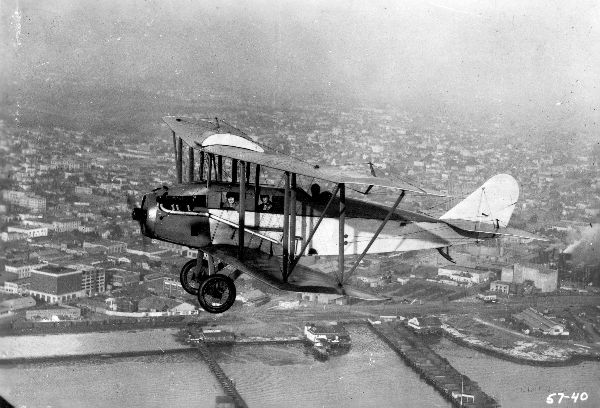
Ryan-Standard, a Ryan conversion of a Standard J-1 trainer

One of Ryan's students was a wealthy young stock broker and real-estate developer named Benjamin Franklin Mahoney, with whom Ryan formed a business partnership. Ryan and Mahoney bought the Douglas Cloudster, which Bowlus modified to carry 10 passengers in comfort. The pilot and co-pilot sat side by side in an open cockpit.

=== Ryan Airlines ===
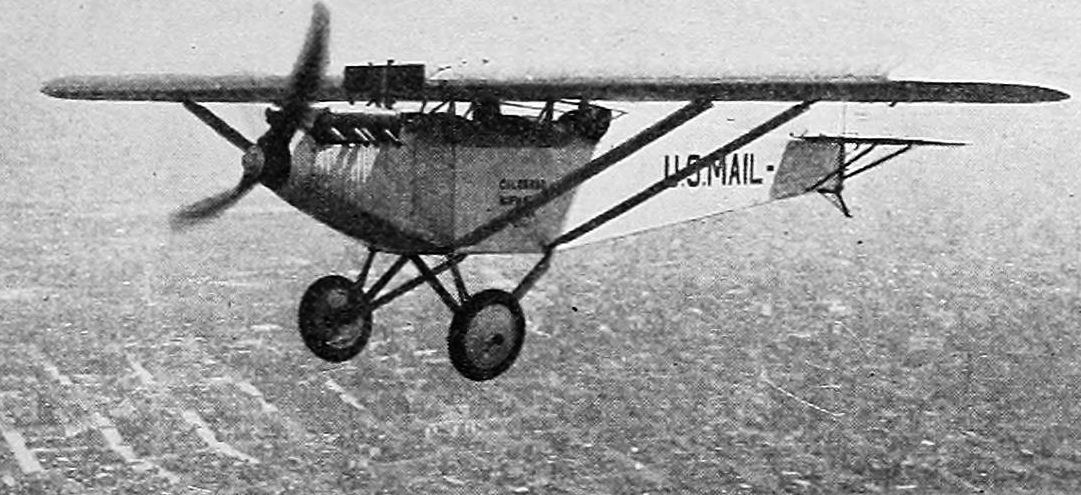
Ryan M-1 in flight, image from Aero Digest December 1926

The company's first production aircraft was the Ryan M-1 monoplane mail plane, which flew in 1926. Working drawings were to have been provided by William J. Waterhouse and Lloyd Royer at Glendale Airport. They failed to provide a complete set, and instead built their own version, the Waterhouse Cruzair. Ryan And Bowlus completed their own plans and construction, while Jack Northrop, employed by Donald Douglas, worked weekends redesigning key aspects of the M-1.

On 30 November 1926, the Ryan-Mahoney partnership ended when Ryan sold his interest in the Ryan Flying Company and Los-Angeles-San Diego Airline. On 15 July 1927, the company was reorganized as the B. F. Mahoney Aircraft Corporation.

Ryan's role after this point is disputed, but it is known that he was not present for the planning and development of Charles Lindbergh's Spirit of St. Louis or the related Ryan Brougham, although they were enclosed and enlarged developments of the M-1.

=== The Ryan Aeronautical Corporation ===
On 1 May 1928, Ryan opened the Ryan Flying School in San Diego. Ryan Airport at Dutch Flats, also offered charter flights and other flying services. The names of these services became known as the T.C. Ryan Flying Service, the T.C. Ryan Flying School, and the T.C. Ryan Aeronautical Corporation.

=== The "new" Ryan Aeronautical Corporation ===
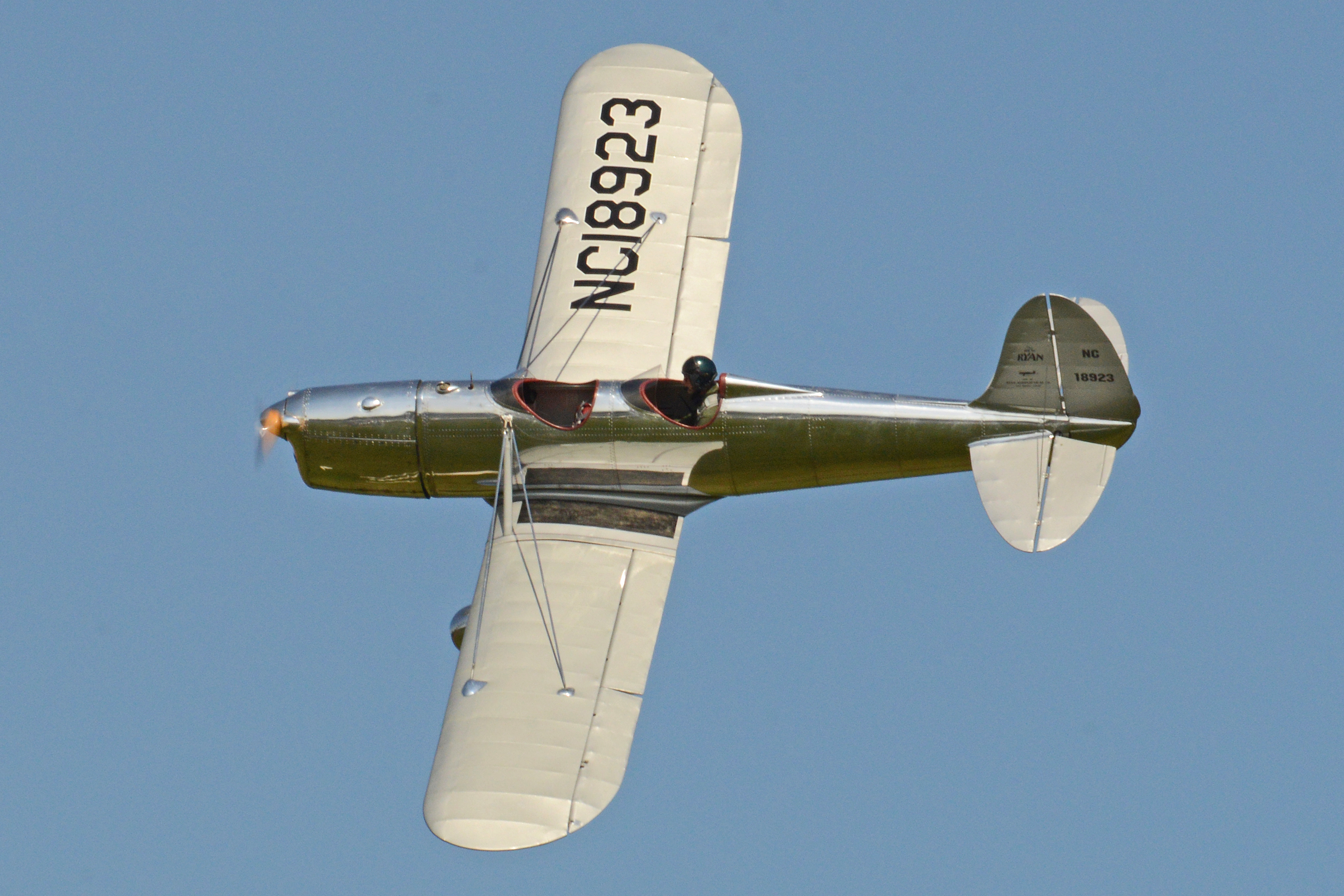
Ryan ST-A in flight

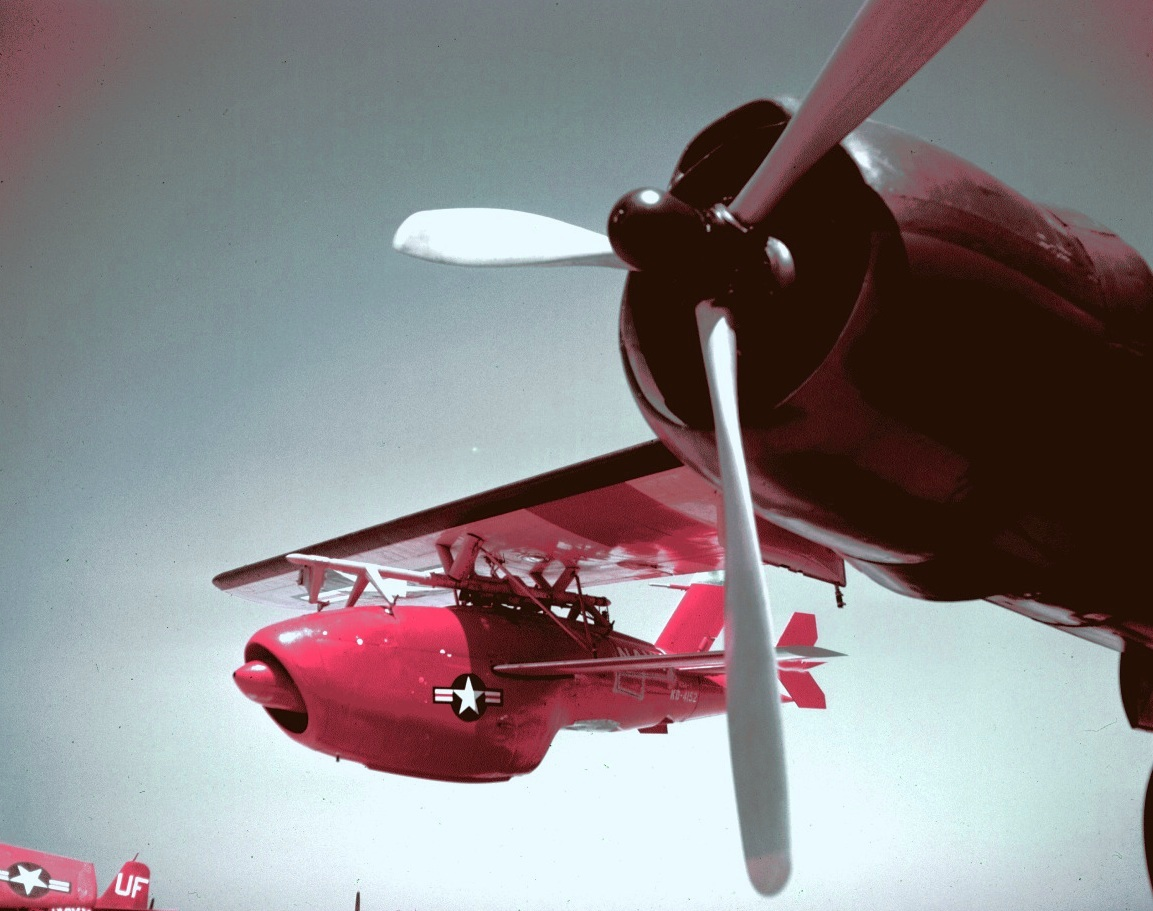
Early version of the Ryan Firebee under its carrier aircraft's wing

In 1931, Ryan organized his flying school in San Diego as the Ryan School of Aeronautics, Ltd. In 1935, the corporate name became The Ryan Aeronautical Company, with the school as a subsidiary. The school used Great Lakes 2T-1 biplanes. This company was one of many around the country that served the government's need for pilot training through the Civilian Pilot Training Program as they were increasing their readiness prior to World War II. Ryan decided to produce his own trainer aircraft, and returned to manufacturing.

By June 1934, Ryan, working with engineers Millard Boyd and Will Vandermeer, had designed and built the first Ryan ST. In 1939, the US military version became the first trainer that was not a biplane.

The ST was followed by S-C Sports Coupe, with an enclosed side-by-side cabin, although this didn't sell as widely and only 11 were built before the war, and the focus on the ST ended production. Ryan developed the YO-51 Dragonfly for observation and liaison, but only built three.

Later, during World War II, Ryan developed the FR-1 Fireball mixed jet/piston power carrier-based fighter of which 66 were delivered to the US Navy. The XF2R-1 Dark Shark replaced the piston engine in the nose with a turboprop.

After the war, Ryan bought the North American Navion design and built it as the Ryan Navion. They also developed and produced the Firebee and related drones, which saw extensive use during the Vietnam War.

They also developed a series of experimental vertical take off and landing aircraft exploring different ideas, including the X-13 Vertijet tailsitter, the VZ-3 Vertiplane, the XV-5 Vertifan and the XV-8 Flexible Wing Aerial Utility Vehicle although none of these led to a production aircraft.

In 1969, Ryan sold Ryan Aeronautical to the Teledyne Corporation, and became a wholly owned subsidiary. The name was changed to Teledyne Ryan Aeronautical Company. The company continued to produce a variety of pilotless drones as well as airframes for the AH-64 Apache helicopter. Despite there being no connection beyond T. Claude Ryan having founded both, Teledyne-Ryan continues to be claimed as the successor of the company that built the Spirit of St. Louis. Teledyne later sold off the drone division to Northrop Grumman.

== Later years ==
After his retirement Ryan formed a new company with his son Jerome to develop and market the Ryan ST-100 Cloudster, a motor glider the elder Ryan had designed. The aircraft was type certified as both a light aircraft and powered glider, but Ryan died before production was commenced and only one was completed.

Ryan died September 11, 1982, in San Diego, California. His wife, Zeta Gladys Bowen Ryan, died in 1997.

== Honors ==
- 1948 - Presidential Certificate of Merit, given by President Harry S. Truman in recognition of Ryan Aeronautical's contribution to the Allied war effort
- 1958 - Horatio Alger Award
- 1965 - International Aerospace Hall of Fame inductee
- 1966 - Mr. San Diego, awarded annually by Civic Leaders of San Diego
- 1970 - Fellow of the American Institute of Aeronautics and Astronautics
- 1971 - Service to Aviation Award, awarded by the National Business Aircraft Show
- 1974 - National Aviation Hall of Fame inductee
- 1975 - Honorary Fellow of the Society of Experimental Test Pilots
- 1981 - Aerospace Life Achievement Award, awarded by AIAA San Diego to a living aerospace pioneer with more than fifty years' experience advancing the frontiers of aeronautics
- 1982 - Honorary Fellow of the American Institute of Aeronautics and Astronautics
