= Miss Peaches =

American comedian

Miss Peaches was the stage name of Elsie Higgs Griner Jr. (July 15, 1924 – April 7, 2011), an American comedian and singer. Although white, Miss Peaches spoke in a broad African-American dialect, though she did not perform in blackface. She also established a newspaper and, known in later life as Annabel Alderman, became a published writer and poet.

== Biography ==
She was born in Nashville, Georgia, and was raised by black nannies. From the 1940s she worked as a stage comedian, performing monologues and songs accompanied by her pianist brother, George "Geunie" Griner, who died in 1975. Her most notable recording, in 1954, was "Callin' Moody Field," which described the lives of African-American airmen at Moody Air Force Base near Valdosta, Georgia. "Callin' Moody Field" was a regional rhythm and blues hit (Groove 0009). In the performance, Miss Peaches is talking to the base telephone operator and trying to reach her boyfriend: "You doesn't know Cathead. Well, honey, just stick yo head out the window and holler for Cathead. He'll come."

From 1961 to 1966, she and Geunie published The Nashville Herald, a weekly newspaper in her hometown of Nashville, Georgia. She twice won the Georgia Press Association's premier recognition for her weekly column, The Focus On:. She and Geunie later turned to political comedy, releasing an LP of political satire called The Focus on: The South, Where the REaction Is!, on Judges' Chamber records (1966). Also on the Judges' Chamber label, probably in 1975, was the Safari Down South LP that showed her riding a llama on the cover. She and Geunie also recorded their family gospel group, the Holy Notes.

She was married in 1952 to USAF Major Hugh D. Alderman, who died in 1973. In 1985, she changed her given name to Annabel.

In 1999, Mercer University Press published her first novel, Family Man. She was nominated for the Georgia Author of the Year Award and for the Townsend Prize for Fiction in 2000. Her poems have appeared in a variety of magazines and she garnered first place in the Southeastern Writers Association's poetry competition in 2001. A collection of her poetry was published in 1996 under the title Lost Loves Don't Count.
