= Tiamat (disambiguation) =

Tiamat is a deity in Babylonian mythology.

Tiamat may also refer to:

== Video games and role playing games ==
- Tiamat, a boss monster in Darksiders
- Tiamat, a reoccurring demon in the Shin Megami Tensei series
- Tiamat (Dungeons & Dragons), a five-headed dragon goddess in Dungeons & Dragons
- Titania (Fire Emblem), or Tiamat, a character in the Fire Emblem series
- Tiamat, a map in the survival game Ark: Survival Evolved
- Tiamat, a fictional planet in the space game Fury3
- Tiamat, a summon in the fantasy role-playing game series Golden Sun
- Tiamat, a Mantis ship in the real-time strategy game Conquest: Frontier Wars
- Tiamat, a mapmaker in Halo: Custom Edition
- Tiamat, a boss enemy in the platform adventure game La-Mulana
- Tiamat, a weapon in League of Legends
- Tiamat, a recurring monster in the Final Fantasy franchise
- Tiamat, a boss in Tales of Zestiria
- The Bracelet of Tiamat, a bracelet stolen at the beginning of Rhythm Thief and the Emperor's Treasure that sets off the plot

== Other media ==
- Tiamat, a planet in the Joan D. Vinge novel The Snow Queen
- Tiamat, an infant dragon in the Bruce Coville novel Jeremy Thatcher, Dragon Hatcher
- Tiamat the Dragon Empress, a character in the anime and manga Mon Colle Knights
- Tiamat is the name of the comet whose fragments fall to Earth and destroy the town of Itomori in the 2016 Japanese animated romantic fantasy film Your Name
- Tiamat, a titan that appears in the Monsterverse series of films
- Tiamat is the name of a series of guided missiles used in Chapter 331 of the Japanese manga series My Hero Academia

== Other ==
- Tiamat (band), a Swedish gothic metal band
- Tiamat (dinosaur), a genus of dinosaurs
- Tiamat (hypothetical planet), a planet in pseudoscientific literature
- Tiamat (yacht), in yacht racing
- JB-3 Tiamat, a World War II-era American air-to-air missile project
- Tiamat (rocket), a U.S. sounding rocket

== See also ==
- Tiamut, also known as the Dreaming Celestial, a fictional character in the Marvel Comics
