= BQM-145 Peregrine =

Type of aircraft

General information
- Type: Reconnaissance UAV
- National origin: United States
- Manufacturer: Teledyne Ryan

History
- First flight: May 1992

The Teledyne Ryan BQM-145 Peregrine (manufacturer designation Model 350) is a reconnaissance unmanned aerial vehicle (UAV) developed in the United States in the 1990s as a joint U.S. Navy/Marine Corps and Air Force "Medium Range UAV" program, with the Navy developing the airframe and the Air Force providing the payload. The BQM-145A was designed to precede airstrike packages into a target area and relay reconnaissance information in real time.

== Design and development ==
Production BQM-145As were to have a metal airframe, but the initial two prototypes were built with plastic composites, with initial flight in May 1992. The program then collapsed in 1993 due to technical difficulties and funding cutbacks. Six BQM-145As with plastic-composite airframes then under construction were later completed, with first flight of a composite BQM-145A in 1997.

== Operational history ==
Apparently Northrop Grumman has continued to use the BQM-145As for other experiments. Some sources claim they have been evaluated for unmanned strike missions, and paintings have been circulated showing a BQM-145A fitted with a "high-power microwave (HPM)" generator in the nose to fry adversary electronic equipment. It has been confirmed that BQM-145As have been flown in the US on test flights carrying HPM payloads.

The BQM-145A has some broad similarities to the Scarab, with a similar configuration except that it has twin air intakes on either side of the fuselage, just forward of the wing roots. Like the Scarab, it has no landing gear. It is powered by a Teledyne CAE F408-CA-400 (Model 382-10C) turbofan engine, with 4.4 kilonewtons (990 lb_{f}) thrust. It can be air launched from a standard fighter aircraft such as the F-16 or the F/A-18.

== Specifications ==
General characteristics

- Crew: None
- Capacity: 300 lb (135 kg) payload
- Length: 18 ft 4 in (5.60 m)
- Wingspan: 10 ft 6 in (3.20 m)
- Gross weight: 2,000 lb (900 kg)
- Powerplant: 1 × Teledyne CAE F408-CA-400 , 1,000 lbf (4.4 kN) thrust

Performance

- Maximum speed: 690 mph (1,115 km/h, 600 kn)
- Range: 810 mi (1,300 km, 700 nmi)
- Service ceiling: 40,000 ft (12,200 m)

== See also ==
Related development

- Teledyne Ryan Scarab

Aircraft of comparable role, configuration, and era

- Ryan Model 147
