= JB-3 Tiamat =

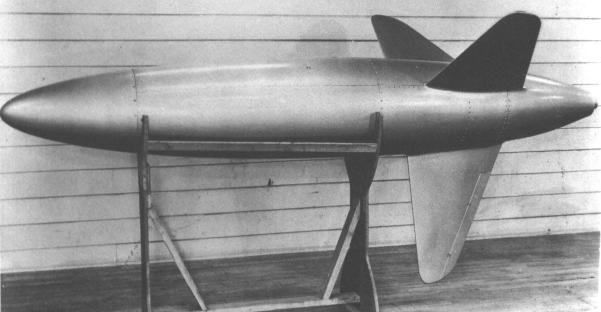
- Type: Air-to-air missile
- Place of origin: United States

Service history
- In service: 1945–1946
- Used by: United States Air Force

Production history
- Designer: Hughes Aircraft Company & NACA
- Designed: 1944
- Manufacturer: Hughes Aircraft Company
- Produced: 1945-1946
- No. built: 35 contracted for before program termination

Specifications
- Mass: 625 pounds (283 kg)
- Warhead: HE
- Warhead weight: 100 pounds (45 kg)
- Engine: Rocket
- Operational range: 9 miles (14 km)
- Flight altitude: 50,000 feet (15,000 m)
- Guidance system: Semi-Active Radar Homing
- Launch platform: Douglas JB-26 Invader (tests)

The JB-3 Tiamat was subsonic air-to-air missile program that began in January 1944 for the U.S. Army Air Force under project MX-570. The prime contractor was Hughes Aircraft Company Electronics Division which developed the Tiamat with the assistance of the National Advisory Committee for Aeronautics (NACA).

Tiamat was propelled by a rocket motor of a boost-sustain dual-thrust type, providing 7,200 lbf (32 kN) of thrust for 3.5 seconds, followed by 200 lbf (0.89 kN) for 45 seconds of cruising flight at 600 miles per hour (970 km/h). Tiamat used semi-active radar homing radar guidance to intercept the target aircraft, with a proximity fuze to detonate the missile's 100 lb (45 kg) high explosive warhead when within effective range of an enemy aircraft. The JB-3 program was quickly reduced in status following the end of WWII. Testing by NACA and US Army Air Force continued into 1946. Though the project was cancelled due to ongoing problems, missiles already under construction were used by the National Advisory Committee for Aeronautics for research during the next few years. During the program considerable research was conducted, including a test of then-novel swept wings. Existing during a period from where anything was tried, to limited development funding, the JB-3 had proven the limits of existing technology as well as providing much experience. With the appearance of more promising missile designs the JB-3 had gone from the cutting edge of technology to obsolete in just a few years time.

== Development ==
The JB designation was introduced by the U.S. Army Air Force in 1943, and covered guided missiles with rocket and/or air-breathing jet (turbojet, pulsejet, ramjet) propulsion. The JB-3 was a subsonic air-to-air design intended for use against bombers particularly "Kamikaze" aircraft. Development began in January 1944, when Hughes was asked to submit a proposal for sub-sonic air-to-air guided missile. In August 1944, Hughes proposed a missile with a tubular body, square wings, conventional tail and a Monsanto WF-1 rocket motor. After studying the proposal Robert Thomas Jones proposed a different design on November 8, 1944. The proposed "short-range interceptor pilotless aircraft" was propelled by a dual-thrust (boost/sustainer) solid-fueled rocket motor and had three comparatively large wings with control surfaces for stability and control. Jones suggested that the missile be named Tiamat. The program was then assigned the research project name of MX-570 and service designation JB-3. The Tiamat was to use a semi-active radar homing seeker and the warhead was to be triggered by a proximity fuze. A large weapon for the time, it weighed 625 pounds with a 100-pound warhead, with a range of about nine miles, at about 600 mph, up to 50,000 feet. Hughes designed the electronics, NACA was responsible for the missile configuration and aerodynamics. On January 29, 1945 NACA RA 1316 was issued starting work upon MX-570.

Launches of the MX-570 begin in late 1944, the first missiles to be launched at Wallops Island under the auspices of the Langley Research Center; MX-570 was slightly smaller than the definitive JB-3, being 11 feet (3.4 m) in length and weighing 625 pounds (283 kg) at launch. The definitive JB-3 "conducted its first test launch on 6 August 1945, the same day that Col. Paul Tibbets flew the B-29 Enola Gay to Hiroshima." In initial tests, the JB-3 was ground-launched with a booster, but in later tests conducted by Hughes and the AAF at Wendover, NV, it was dropped from the wings of a JB-26 Invader.

A report for Headquarters Air Materiel Command at Wright Field, Ohio, dated 1 October 1945, states: "Wind tunnel tests have been run in the five-foot tunnel at Wright Field and in the Free Flight Tunnel at NACA, Langley Field. Free-flight rocket-propelled model tests are now in progress at NACA, Langley Field. Tests of the first group of four Hughes JB-3's [sic] have been tested at Wendover Field, Utah. The first JB-3 test failed because of premature operation of the camera rescue parachute. The second JB-3 flew approximately a straight line controlled flight into the ground. The third JB-3 tumbled before the motor fired. The fourth had one or two seconds of controlled flight after the accelerating rocket failed to operate. The fifth JB-3 oscillated violently on its mount before release, rolled immediately after release and the rocket motor exploded after 15 seconds of flight. The sixth JB-3 flew in a steady 12° dive for its entire flight exhibiting fairly good stability. The seventh JB-3 developed a pre-launching oscillation and tumbled upon release. Its rocket motor exploded after 4 seconds. Both the oscillation experienced before launching and the rocket motor failures are expected to be eliminated in the near future. Flight data indicates that control rates in roll and pitch should be decreased. Sufficient tests have not been made to obtain performance data."

The report continued concerning future testing, "Tests on the aerodynamic configuration and control characteristics and [sic] to continue at Langley and Wendover. Variations of three and four winged missiles and swept-back wing missiles will be made at Langley. Difficulties in development of the radar seeker are being experienced and at this time a date cannot be set for the test of the JB-3 under seeker control. Tests of ten JB-3's [sic] with Flight Test Assemblies which simulate seeker control will begin approximately 15 January 1946." Of NACA testing, the report states that "The dummy and No. 1 instrumented model have been launched. Trouble was experienced in the phase of flight where the launching booster leaves the model due to instability of the booster unit. A new booster unit incorporating a single boosting rocket is now being designed around the Monsanto ACL-1 rocket."

The report concludes that "The first seven JB-3's [sic] have been tested at Wendover Field, Utah. Three JB-3's [sic] are scheduled for delivery on 8 October 1945. These missiles are auto-pilot controlled and are set to fly a straight line trajectory. Of the thirty-five (35) full scaled models planned, the NACA has six (6) under construction." MX-570 provided a great deal of early guided missile experience for the National Advisory Committee for Aeronautics. Aerodynamic design of the Tiamat had been the responsibility of Robert T. Jones of NACA Langley

In 1944 NACA, recognizing the need to expand its capabilities to study aerodynamic research at higher speeds, the agency determined that a location was necessary to study missiles, and that radar and telemetry would be required. The location selected was Wallops Island, VA, not too distant from Langley, VA. NACA had already adopted the SCR-584 radar with the M-9 computer for tracking research aircraft. NACA's Langley Laboratory had already been involved in Army Air Force and Navy missile development starting with the General Motors Flying Bomb. During most of the war research had involved a variety of NACA services. The MX-570 which was largely being designed and developed by NACA for Hughes Electronics required a variety of services including Stability Analysis and the Free Flight Wind Tunnel. Yet a still more capable means of research was needed, a facility to study the full capabilities of a guided missile. The NACA program of Tiamat tests from Wallops Island began with the transfer of responsibility to Charles Seacord of the Auxiliary Flight Research Station and to Robert Gardiner of the Instrument Research Division.

NACA determined that the original three wing design had limited stability at high angles of attack so the design was changed to have four wings (Tiamat B). Later the design was altered to have the wings swept back at a 41 degree angle (Tiamat C). Test of the Tiamat B (four winged) were generally unsuccessful with only one completing the programmed turn on August 7, 1946.

On 31 March 1946, the Air Proving Ground Command, Eglin Field, Florida, completed the tactical suitability test of the JB-3 Tiamat, Project MX-570.

== Cancellation ==
Testing and development of the JB-3 continued briefly after World War II, but the JB-3 was found unsatisfactory and in September 1946 the AAF program was officially terminated. "During Christmas week, known at Wright Field as the black Christmas of 1946, the president ordered a drastic cutback in fiscal year 1947 research and development spending, effective immediately. After hasty study, the Air Staff deleted more than 55 percent of the guided missile budget, reducing it from $29 million to $13 million." By 1946, much more promising air-to-air missile projects had been started, notably the AAM-A-1 Firebird and AAM-A-2/F-98/GAR-1 Falcon. The Huges AAM-A-2, MX-798, began in 1946 and under test by 1947 was built upon experience gained from the Tiamat.

== Later use ==
Two additional tests by NACA using existing examples of Tiamat continued into 1948. The last NACA test using a Tiamat missile was launched in June 1948 to test a roll stabilization system proposed by Robert R. Gilruth. By that time the Tiamat C was equipped with the latest six-channel telemetry system. The JB-3 was in one sense a failure, more ambitious than the technology existing in 1944-1945 could achieve; however it provided valuable experience both in design, flight test, telemetry, and experience in what was needed for a successful air-to-air missile. Hughes's subsequent AIM-4 Falcon was the USAF's most important air-to-air missile of the 1950s and 1960s.

== Books ==
- Dryden, Hugh L.; Morton, Martyn D. (1964). Guidance and Homing of Missiles and Pilotless Aircraft. Wright Field, Dayton, Ohio: Headquarters Air Materiel Command.
- Hansen, James R. (1987). SP-4305 Engineer in Charge, A History of the Langley Aeronautical Laboratory, 1917-1958. Scientific and Technical Information Office National Aeronautics and Space Administration Washington, D.C.
- DeVincent-Hayes, Nan; Bowen Bennett (2001). Wallops Island. Images of America. Charleston, SC: Arcadia Publishing. ISBN 978-0-7385-0666-1.
- Ordway, Frederick Ira; Ronald C. Wakeford (1960). International Missile and Spacecraft Guide. New York: McGraw-Hill. ASIN B000MAEGVC.
- Rosenberg, Max (1964). The Air Force and The National Guided Missile Program 1944-1950. USAF Historical Division Liaison Office.
- Shortal, Joseph A. (1978). A New Dimension Wallops Island Flight Test Range: The First Fifteen Years. NASA Scientific and Technical Information Office.
- Werrell, Kenneth P. (1985). The Evolution of the Cruise Missile. Maxwell Air Force Base, Alabama: Air University Press.
- Wolf, William (2021). Off Target America's Guided Bombs, Missiles and Drones 1917-1950. London: Fonthill Media Ltd. ISBN 978-1-78155-816-4.
