= Stinson L-1 Vigilant =

WW2 American liaison aircraft

L-1 (O-49) Vigilant
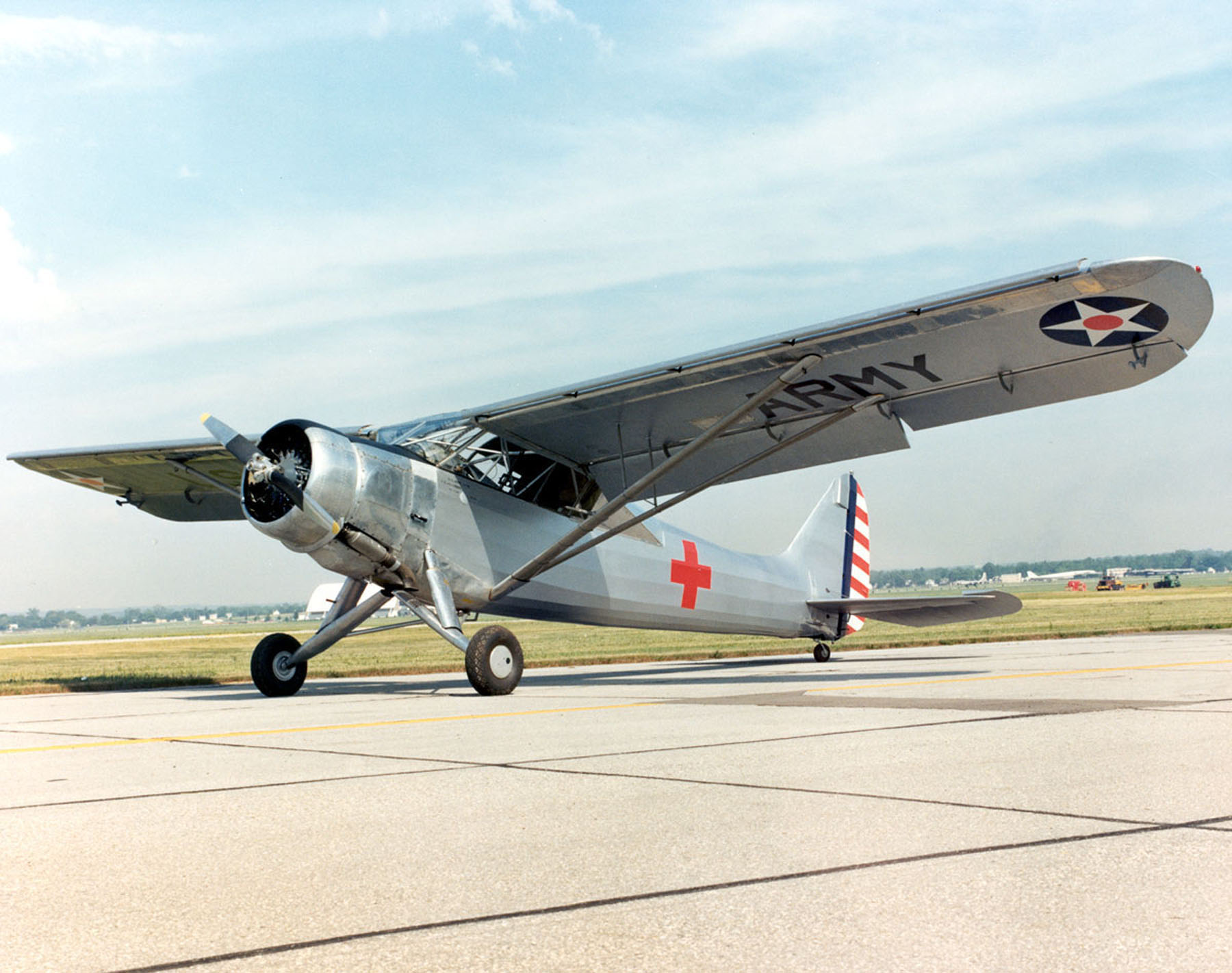

General information
- Type: Light Observation, Liaison
- Manufacturer: Stinson Aircraft Corporation
- Primary users: United States Army Air Corps Royal Air Force
- Number built: 324

History
- Introduction date: 1941
- First flight: 15 July 1940

The Stinson L-1 Vigilant (company designation Model 74) is an American liaison aircraft designed by the Stinson Aircraft Company of Wayne, Michigan and manufactured at the Vultee-Stinson factory in Nashville, Tennessee (in August 1940 Stinson became a division of Vultee Aircraft Corporation). The aircraft was operated by the United States Army Air Corps as the O-49 until 1942 when the L-1 designation was applied. Although declared obsolete after the manufacturing contract was fulfilled, it continued in service with the Army Air Forces through 1945.

== Design and development ==
The Vigilant was designed in response to a 1938 United States Army Air Corps design competition for a two-seat, short-range observation and liaison aircraft. After the German-manufactured Fieseler Storch was demonstrated at the 4th International Air Meet in Zurich, Switzerland in 1937, the Air Corps Material Division at Wright Field initiated a feasibility study for the creation of a similar aircraft. The development program was approved in January 1938, design and performance specifications were determined in April 1938, and a Circular Proposal for a formal design competition was released to manufacturers in August 1938, just twelve days before a Storch was demonstrated at the Cleveland Air Races by German aviator Emil Kropf. Stinson (later a division of Vultee), won the $1.5 million contract over 11 competitors, including the Bellanca YO-50 and Ryan YO-51 Dragonfly.

Stinson won the $1.5 million contract with an initial order for 100, later extended to 142 aircraft. Eleven competing designs included the Bellanca YO-50 and Ryan YO-51 Dragonfly that were each runners-up and garnered 3-plane contracts for further evaluation. The Stinson Model 74 was a radial-engined, high-wing monoplane with large trailing-edge slotted flaps and full-span leading-edge automatic slats for low-speed, high-lift, short-field performance. The Model 74 prototype was given the Army designation YO-49 for evaluation, with the first flight by test pilot Al Schramm taking place on 15 July 1940.

The aircraft was built of chrome-molybdenum steel tubing and covered with doped cotton fabric; the engine cowling and the fuselage, forward of the wing, was fully enclosed in aluminum. Control surfaces and the empennage were fabric-covered stainless steel. The Lycoming power plant was hand-cranked with an inertial starter and was fitted with a Hamilton Standard constant speed propeller. At least 12 ambulance conversions were fitted with Edo 49-4000 floats (4,000-pound displacement) for amphibious operations.

The Vigilant could maintain stable, level flight at 31 miles per hour and in a 20 mph breeze it was capable of stopping within its own length. Given an adequate headwind, it gave the illusion of "hovering" and sometimes surprised onlookers by drifting backward. Under calm conditions the L-1 could land and take off again inside a 200 foot diameter circle, and when landing over a 50-foot obstacle it could stop on dry sod within 300 feet with a ground roll of approximately 100 feet.

== Operational history ==
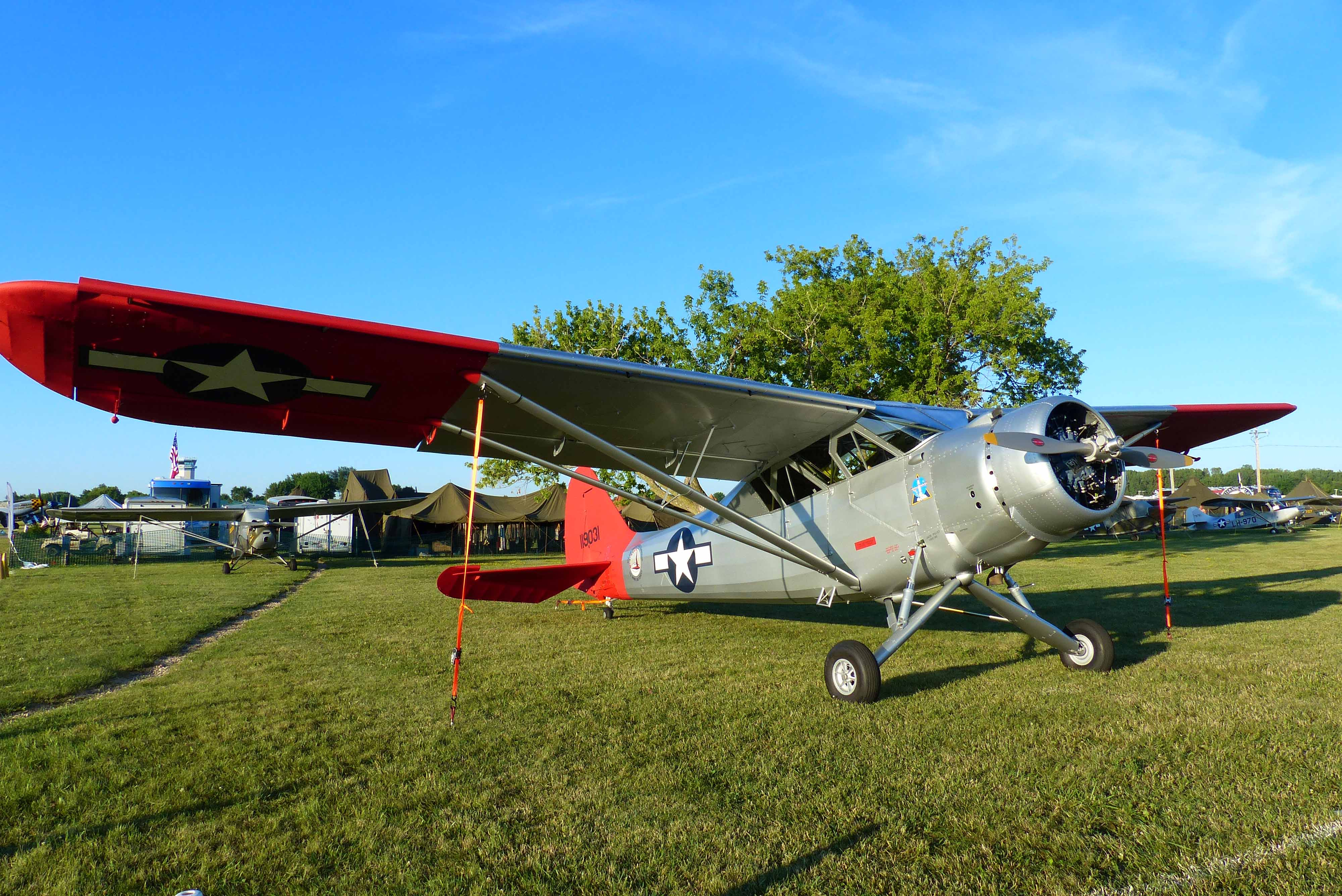
1941 L-1, Reserve Grand Champion, AirVenture 2016

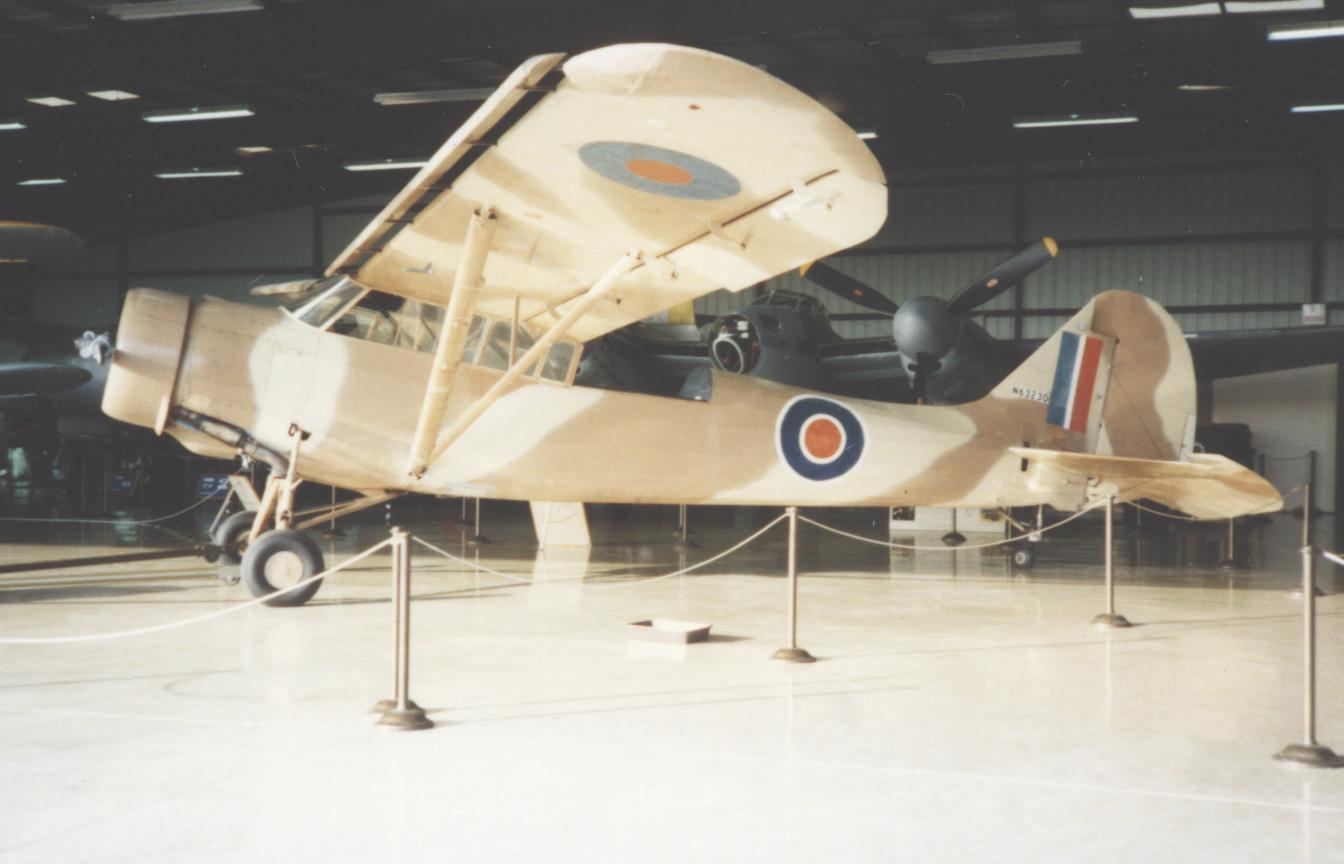
Ex-USAAC O-49 Vigilant in the Weeks Museum at Tamiami, Florida, in 1989 wearing RAF-style markings

The Stinson Vigilant was designed for artillery spotting, liaison, and short-range courier missions, but was also used in diverse roles such as towing training gliders, search and rescue, delivering supplies, and espionage work with the OSS. A second contract was awarded for the O-49A which had a slightly longer fuselage and other equipment changes. In April 1942 the type was re-designated as the L-1 and L-1A. Up to 17 L-1 and 96 L-1A aircraft were allocated to the British Royal Air Force under the Lend-Lease Act, with varying numbers given for aircraft actually delivered (see Variants, below), but the majority of the order was cancelled. The RAF designated it as the Vigilant Mk I and Vigilant Mk II respectively. General Harry Crerar, Commander of the First Canadian Army in Europe during World War II, retained a Vigilant for his personal use.

Many of the aircraft were modified for a variety of roles including casualty evacuation at which it excelled during the Burma campaigns of 1944 and 1945. Due to its high cost, the contract was not extended beyond 1942 and it was superseded by thousands of inexpensive militarized civilian types known as "grasshoppers, including the Taylorcraft L-2, Aeronca L-3, and Piper L-4. Stinson's L-5 Sentinel was designed and built to military specifications as a lower cost replacement for the Vigilant and 3,590 were delivered during WWII.

A Vigilant was modified in 1943–1944 for experiments in boundary layer control.

== Variants ==
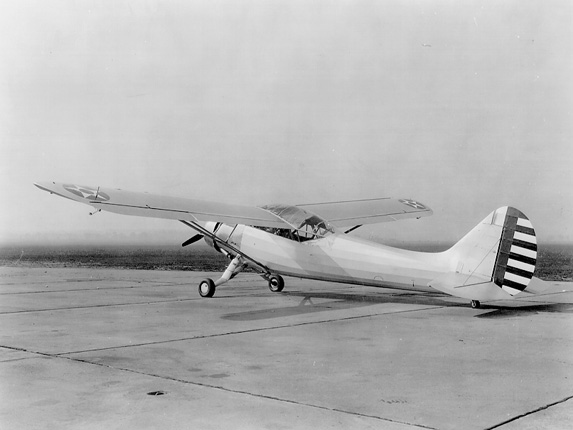
O-49 Vigilant at Patterson Field during World War II

Stinson Model 74
company designation
O-49 Vigilant
U.S. Army designation for first production batch, 142 built.
L-1 Vigilant
1942 redesignation of O-49.
O-49A Vigilant
Fuselage lengthened 13 in (33 cm) 182 built.
O-49B Vigilant
Conversion to ambulance variant, three or four converted.
L-1A Vigilant
1942 redesignation of O-49A.
L-1B Vigilant
1942 redesignation of O-49B.
L-1C Vigilant
L-1A ambulance variant, 113 converted.
L-1D Vigilant
L-1A training glider tug, 14 to 21 converted.
L-1E Vigilant
L-1 amphibious ambulance variant, seven converted.
L-1F Vigilant
L-1A amphibious ambulance variant, five conversions.
Vigilant Mk I
RAF designation of L-1, 14 to 17 allocated by Lend Lease
Vigilant Mk II
RAF designation of L-1A, 96 allocated, circa 13 to 54 delivered
CQ-2 Vigilant
US Navy conversion of L-1A to target control aircraft, one or more converted

== Operators ==
United Kingdom

- Royal Air Force

United States

- United States Army Air Corps

== Surviving aircraft ==
Airworthy

- 40-3102 – operated by the Fantasy of Flight in Polk City, Florida. This aircraft flew for the first time after restoration on 18 July 2013.
- 41-18915 – operated by the Alaska Aviation Heritage Museum in Anchorage, Alaska.
- 41-19031 – privately owned and operated in Blaine, Minnesota.

On Display

- 40-3141 – United States Army Aviation Museum at Fort Novosel, Alabama.
- 41-19039 – National Museum of the United States Air Force in Dayton, Ohio.

Under restoration or in storage

- 40-0283 – under restoration by G & P.M. Turner in London.

== Specifications (L-1A) ==
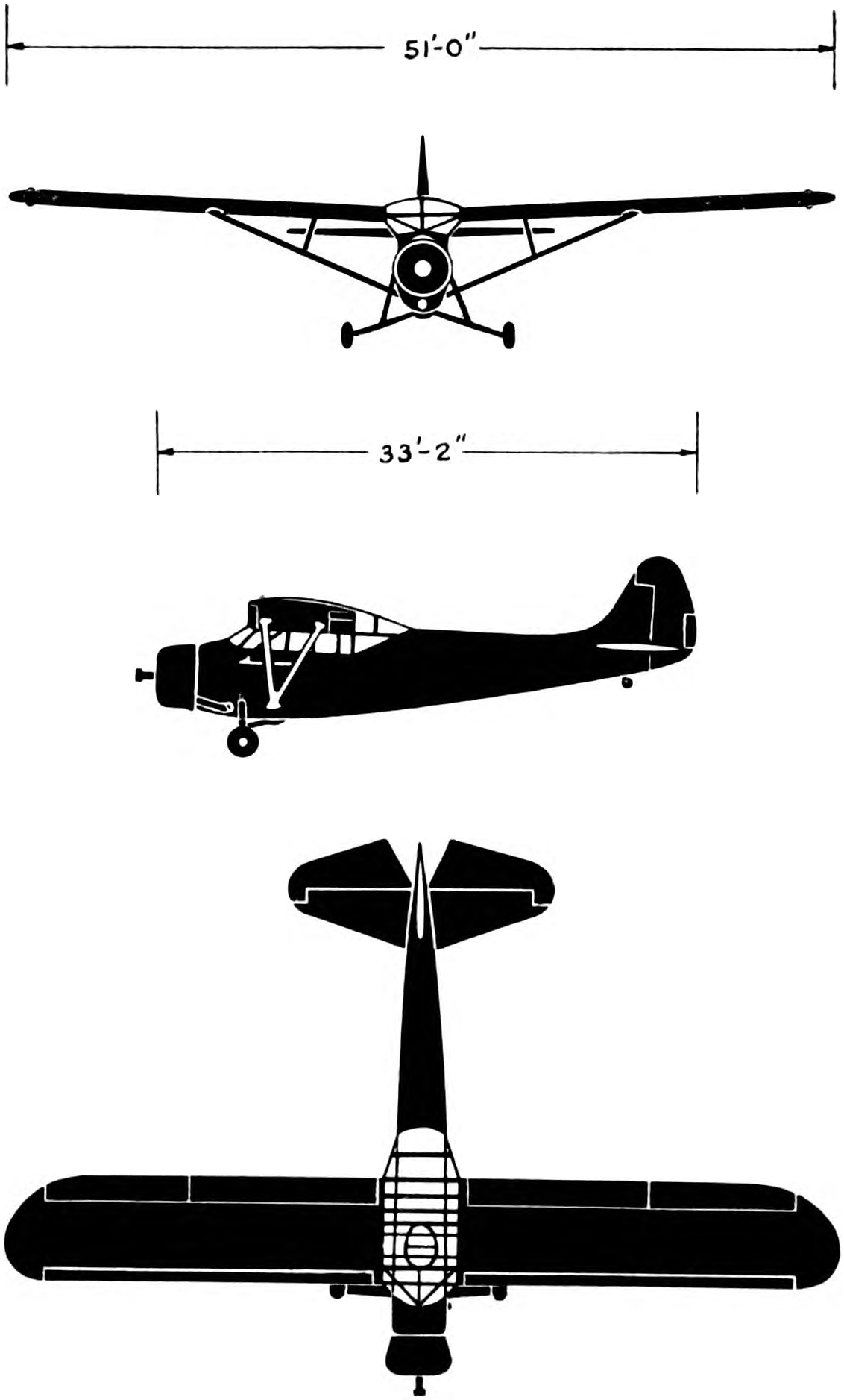
3-view silhouette of the Vultee L-1 Vigilant

Data from American Warplanes of World War II

General characteristics

- Crew: 3
- Length: 34 ft 3 in (10.44 m)
- Wingspan: 50 ft 11 in (15.52 m)
- Height: 10 ft 2 in (3.10 m)
- Wing area: 329 sq ft (30.6 m^{2})
- Empty weight: 2,670 lb (1,211 kg)
- Max takeoff weight: 3,400 lb (1,542 kg)
- Powerplant: 1 × Lycoming R-680-9 9-cylinder air-cooled radial piston engine, 295 hp (220 kW)
- Propellers: 2-bladed fixed-pitch propeller

Performance

- Maximum speed: 122 mph (196 km/h, 106 kn)
- Range: 243 mi (391 km, 211 nmi)
- Service ceiling: 12,800 ft (3,900 m)
- Rate of climb: 408 ft/min (2.07 m/s)
- Wing loading: 10.3 lb/sq ft (50 kg/m^{2})
- Power/mass: 0.0867 hp/lb (0.1425 kW/kg)

== See also ==
Aircraft of comparable role, configuration, and era

- Bellanca YO-50
- Fieseler Fi 156 Storch
- Miles Messenger
- Polikarpov Po-2
- Repülőgépgyár Levente II
- Ryan YO-51 Dragonfly
- Westland Lysander

Related lists

- List of aircraft of the Royal Air Force
- List of aircraft of World War II
- List of military aircraft of the United States
