= AIM-26 Falcon =

US air-to-air guided missile

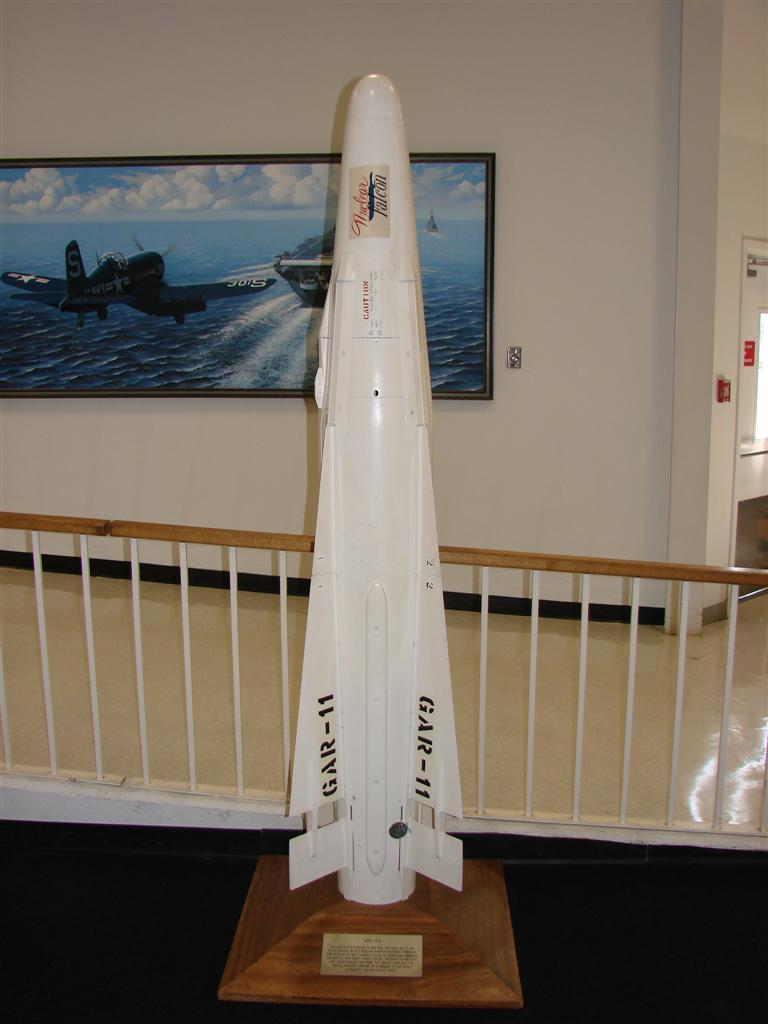

The AIM-26 Falcon was a larger, more powerful version of the AIM-4 Falcon air-to-air missile built by Hughes. It is the only guided American air-to-air missile with a nuclear warhead to be produced; the unguided AIR-2 Genie rocket was also nuclear-armed.

== Development ==
Starting in 1956 Hughes Electronics began the development of an enlarged version of the GAR-1D Falcon that would carry a nuclear warhead. It was intended to provide a sure kill in attacks on Soviet heavy bomber aircraft, at a time when guided missiles were not accurate enough to produce high-probability kills with small conventional warheads. The original development was for semi-active radar homing and heat-seeking versions based on the conventional GAR-1/GAR-2 weapons, under the designations GAR-5 and GAR-6, respectively. The original program was cancelled.

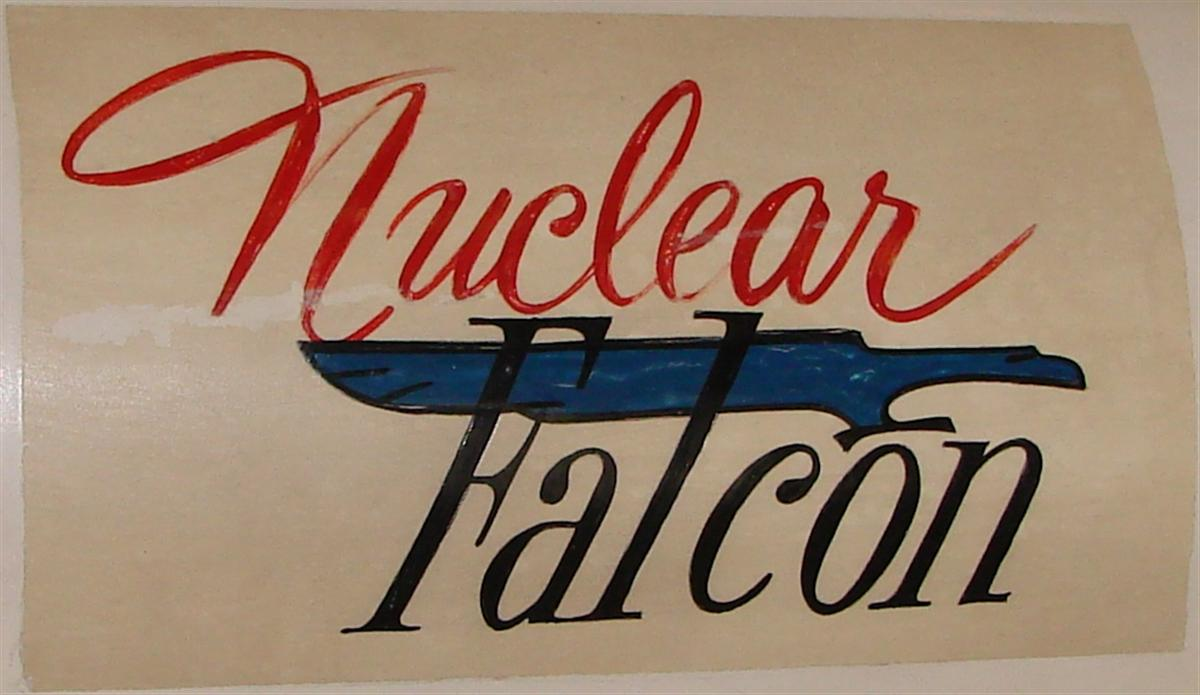
Artwork on warhead of AIM-26A on display at the National Museum of Naval Aviation.

The program was revived in 1959, now under the name GAR-11. It entered service in 1961, carried by Air Defense Command F-102 Delta Dagger interceptors. It used a radar proximity fuze and semi-active radar homing. The GAR-11 used a sub-kiloton (250 ton) yield W54 warhead shared with the "Davy Crockett" M388 recoilless rifle projectile, rather than the larger W25 warhead of the AIR-2 Genie.

Out of concern for the problems inherent in using nuclear weapons over friendly territory, a conventional version, the GAR-11A, was developed, using a 40 lb (18 kg) explosive warhead.

== Conventional warhead ==
As part of a wider Army/Navy/Air Force renaming project, in 1963 the weapon was redesignated AIM-26. The nuclear version became the AIM-26A, the conventional model the AIM-26B. From 1970 to 1972 the nuclear warheads of the AIM-26A weapons were rebuilt for the nuclear version of the AGM-62 Walleye TV guided bomb.

The AIM-26 saw little widespread use in American service, retiring in 1972. The conventional AIM-26B was exported to Switzerland as the HM-55, where it was used on Swiss Mirage IIIS fighters. The AIM-26B was produced under license (and modified) in Sweden as the Rb 27, arming Saab Draken J-35F and 35J fighters. It was retired in 1998. When Finland bought Drakens, the license-manufactured Swedish Falcons were included.

== Specifications (GAR-11/AIM-26A) ==
- Length: 84.25 in (2.140 m)
- Wingspan: 24.4 in (62 cm)
- Diameter: 11.4 in (29 cm)
- Weight: 203 lb (92 kg)
- Speed: Mach 2
- Range: 6 mi (9.7 km)
- Guidance: semi-active radar homing
- Warhead: W54 nuclear, explosive yield 250 t TNT equivalent

== Surviving Examples ==
Below is an incomplete list of museums which have an AIM-26 in their collection:

- Museum of Aviation, Warner Robins, Georgia (AIM-26 A)
- National Museum of Naval Aviation, Naval Air Station Pensacola, Florida (AIM-26 A)
- DVHAA Historical Aircraft Museum, Naval Air Station Joint Reserve Base Willow Grove, Pennsylvania (AIM-26 A)
- Suomen ilmavoimamuseo / Finnish Air Force Museum, Finland (AIM-26 B / RB 27)
- Robotmuseum / Robot Museum Arboga, Sweden (AIM-26 B / RB 27)
- Västerås Flygmuseum / Västerås Aviation Museum Västerås, Sweden (AIM-26 B / RB 27)
- Musée Clin d'Ailes / Clin d'Ailes Museum, Payerne Airbase, Switzerland (HM-55)

== See also ==
- W54 Warhead
- List of missiles
- Related Development
  - AIM-4 Falcon
  - GAR-9 / AIM-47 Falcon
  - AIM-54 Phoenix
