= Ryan S-C =

American light aircraft

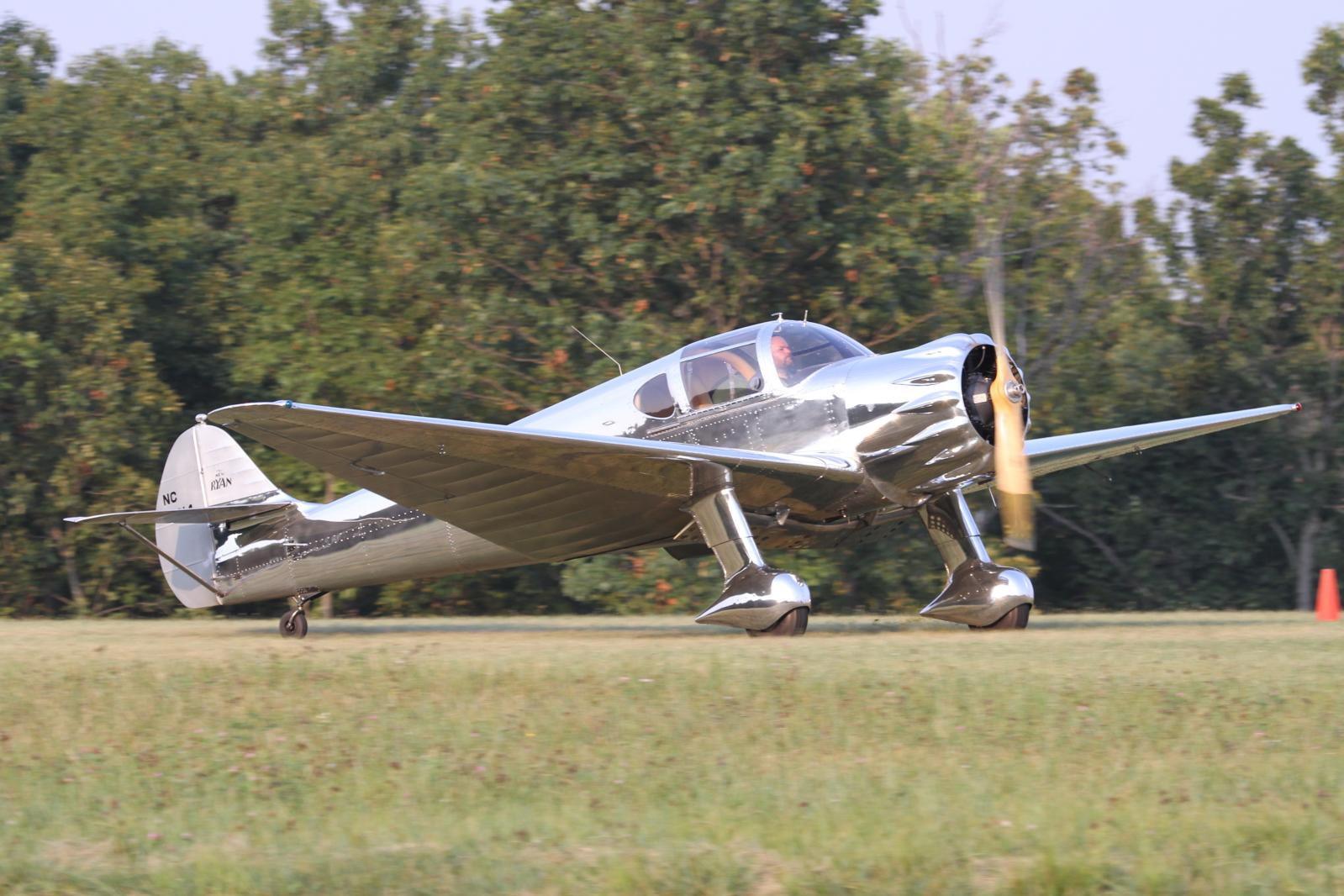
- Ryan SCW-145

General information
- Type: Three-seat cabin monoplane
- National origin: United States
- Manufacturer: Ryan Aeronautical Company
- Number built: 13

History
- First flight: 1937

The Ryan S-C (Sports-Coupe) (or Sport Cabin) was an American three-seat cabin monoplane designed and built by the Ryan Aeronautical Company. At least one was impressed into service with the United States Army Air Forces as the L-10.

== Development ==
The Ryan S-C was a low-wing cantilever monoplane with a fixed tailwheel landing gear, designed to be an up-market version of the Ryan S-T trainer. The prototype first flew in 1937, and had a nose-mounted 150 hp (112 kW) Menasco inline piston engine. Production aircraft were fitted with a 145 hp (108 kW) Warner Super Scarab radial engine. With the company's involvement in producing trainer aircraft for the United States military, the S-C was not seriously marketed, and only 11 complete SCs (s/n 202 through 212) were built, all delivered in 1938; two more were later assembled from parts (s/n 213 in 1941 and s/n 214 in 1959). At least one example – probably as many as five, s/n 202, 203, 207, 211 and 212 – were impressed into service with the Civil Air Patrol, auxiliary of the United States Army Air Forces for anti-submarine patrol and warfare duties on the East coast of the US, and was designated the L-10. At the start of the 21st Century, four examples were still airworthy in the United States.

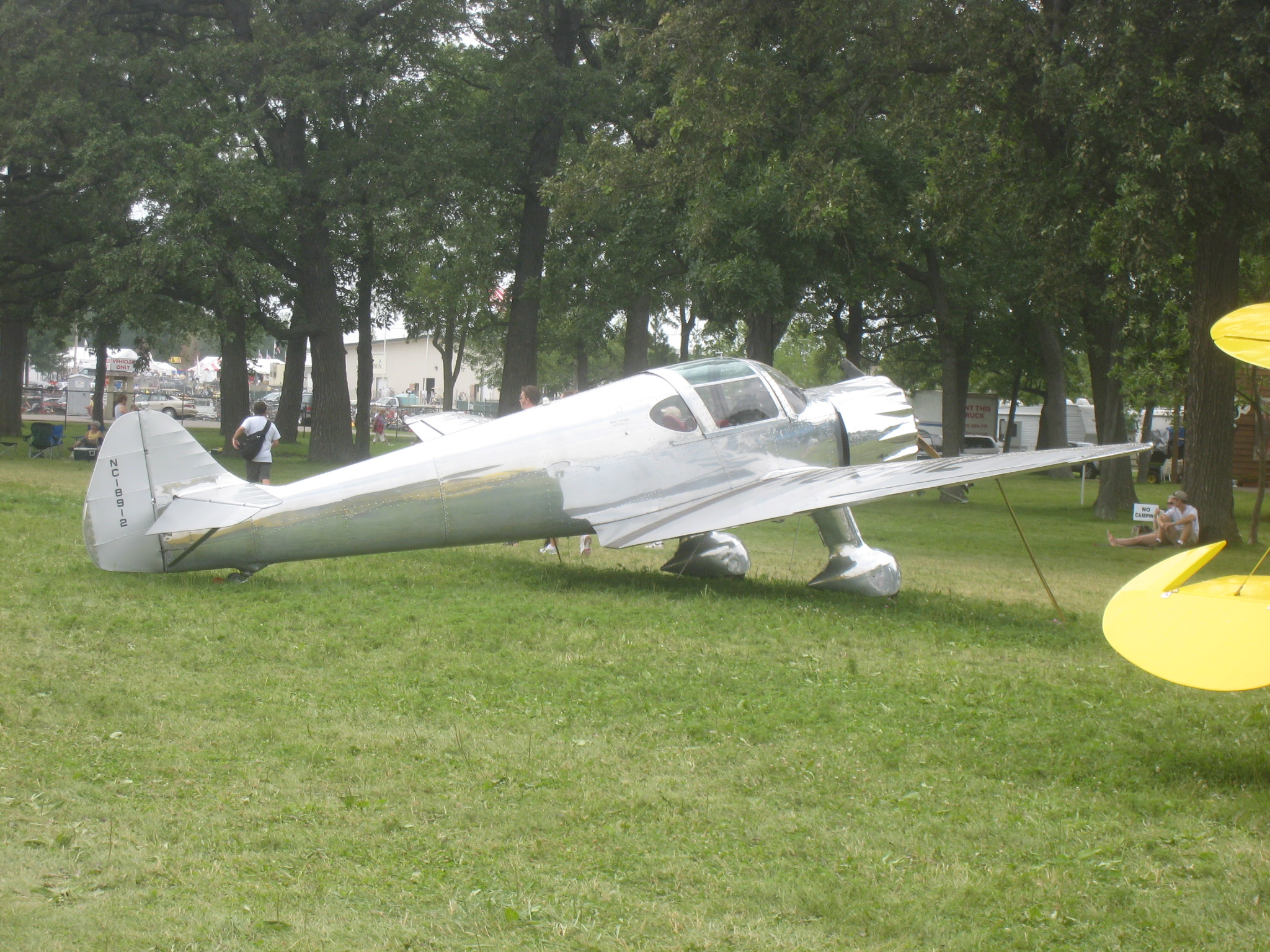
Ryan SCW-145

According to Cassagneres, "The spar did not run as one unit throughout the span. The metal 'monocoque spar,' as it was sometimes termed, was developed by Ryan and patented by him. Actually, the spar embodied the full forward third portion of the wing. This leading edge area was assembled as a single unit with major stresses, carried by the outer skin. It was further stiffened by nose ribs and single vertical webs located about one third of the chord. Thus the entire forward portion of the wing formed a light but strong tapered box spar. A single perforated dural belly flap of split type, beneath the wing at a point about one-third back from the leading edge, was a new approach to the landing problem."

== Variants ==
S-C later S-C-M
Prototype powered by a 150hp (112kW) Menasco C4S inline engine, one built later converted to S-C-W.
S-C-W
Production aircraft powered by a 145hp (108kW) Warner Super Scarab radial engine, 12 built.
L-10
United States Army Air Forces designation for one S-C-W impressed into service in 1942, it was disposed of in November 1944.
Later Modifications
Two SC-Ws exist with a horizontally opposed 6-cylinder Continental engine. One was modified from a radial-powered SC-W, and one was built with the 6-cylinder engine after WWII using spare airframe parts from the original pre-WWII production run.

== Operators ==
United States

- United States Army Air Forces

== Specifications (S-C-W) ==
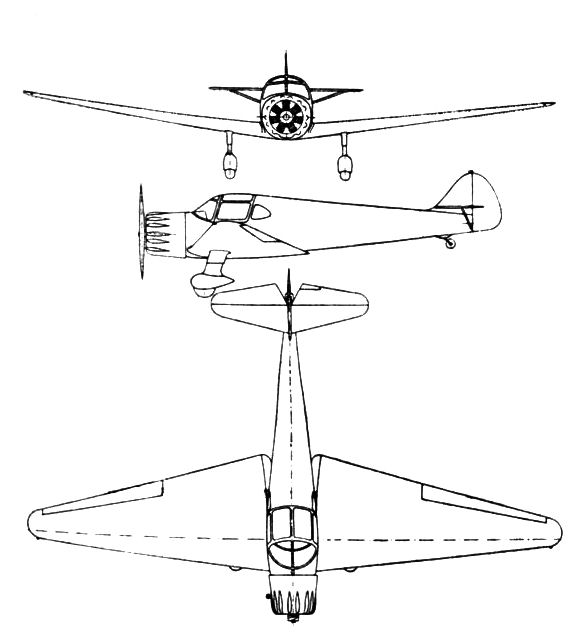
Ryan SCW 3-view drawing from L'Aerophile January 1938

Data from American Planes and Engines for 1940

General characteristics

- Crew: 1
- Capacity: 2 passengers
- Length: 25 ft 4 1/2 in (7.73 m)
- Wingspan: 37 ft 6 in (11.43 m)
- Height: 6 ft 10 in (2.08 m)
- Wing area: 202.0 sq ft (18.77 m^{2})
- Airfoil: NACA-2412
- Empty weight: 1,345 lb (610 kg)
- Gross weight: 2,150 lb (975 kg)
- Fuel capacity: 37 US gal (31 imp gal; 140 L)
- Powerplant: 1 × Warner Super Scarab radial engine, 145 hp (108 kW)

Performance

- Maximum speed: 150 mph (240 km/h, 130 kn) at sea level
- Cruise speed: 135 mph (217 km/h, 117 kn) at 8,500 ft (2,600 m)
- Stall speed: 45 mph (72 km/h, 39 kn)
- Range: 525 mi (845 km, 456 nmi)
- Service ceiling: 17,200 ft (5,200 m)
- Rate of climb: 900 ft/min (4.6 m/s)

== See also ==
Related lists

- List of military aircraft of the United States
