= Bellanca YO-50 =

YO-50
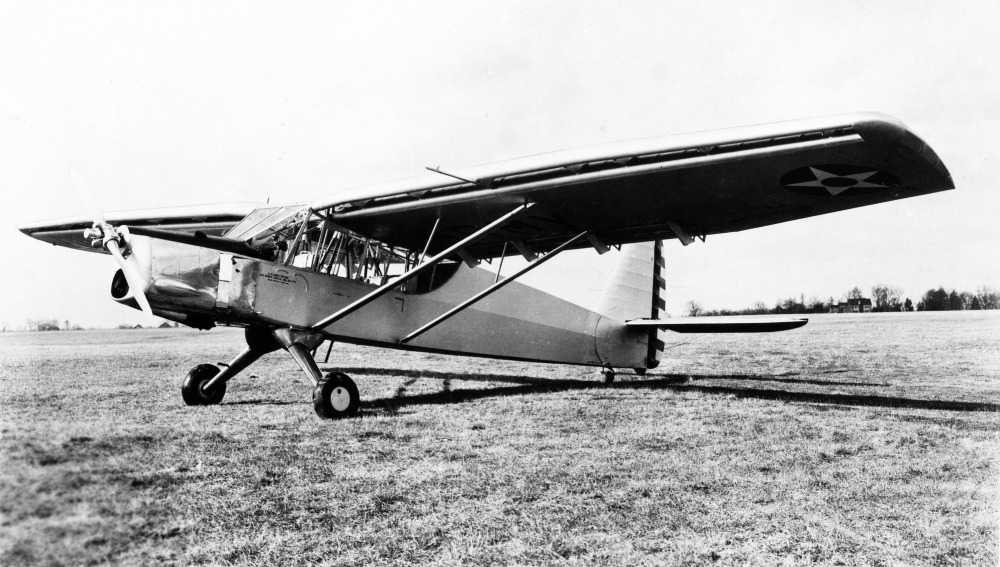

General information
- Type: Army observation aircraft
- Manufacturer: Bellanca
- Number built: 3

History
- First flight: 1940

The Bellanca YO-50 was a United States prototype observation aircraft, built for the United States Army in 1940. Typical for aircraft of its type, it was a high-wing braced monoplane with fixed tailwheel undercarriage and extensive cabin glazing. Its inverted "V" engine made it resemble its German equivalent, the Fieseler Storch.

Three examples were purchased for evaluation against the Stinson YO-49 and Ryan YO-51 Dragonfly. The Stinson won the production contract, and no further YO-50s were built.

== Specifications ==
Data from Plane Facts: Bellanca's "Storch"

General characteristics

- Crew: two
- Length: 35 ft 2 in (10.72 m)
- Wingspan: 55 ft 6 in (16.92 m)
- Gross weight: 3,887 lb (1,763 kg)
- Powerplant: 1 × Ranger V-770-1 air-cooled inverted V12 engine, 420 hp (310 kW)

Performance

- Maximum speed: 126 mph (203 km/h, 109 kn)
- Cruise speed: 105 mph (169 km/h, 91 kn)

== See also ==
Aircraft of comparable role, configuration, and era

- Ryan YO-51 Dragonfly
- Stinson L-1 Vigilant (YO-49)
