= Ryan YO-51 Dragonfly =

YO-51 Dragonfly
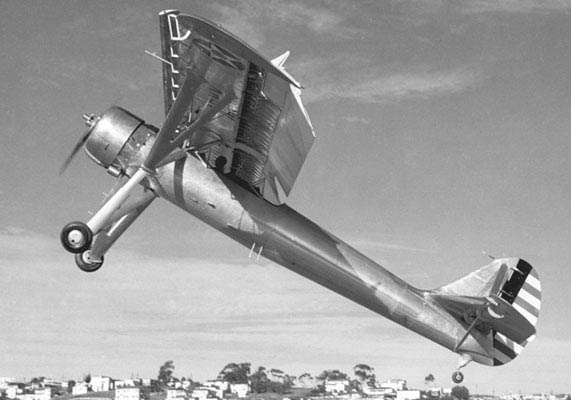

General information
- Type: Army observation and liaison
- Manufacturer: Ryan Aeronautical
- Primary user: United States Army Air Corps
- Number built: 3

History
- First flight: 1940

The Ryan YO-51 Dragonfly was an observation aircraft designed and built by Ryan Aeronautical for the United States Army Air Corps (USAAC). A single-engined parasol wing monoplane, it was designed for optimum STOL capability, but although three prototypes proved highly successful in testing, the Stinson YO-49 was judged superior and no production contract was placed.

== Design ==
The design of the YO-51 Dragonfly was typical for aircraft of its type, being optimised for the observation and liaison role, with emphasis on the ability to operate out of the smallest possible airfields. The Dragonfly was a high-wing braced parasol monoplane with fixed tailwheel landing gear, a two-seat open cockpit, and full-span slots and Fowler flaps for STOL capability. It was powered by a single Pratt & Whitney R-985-21 Wasp Junior radial engine.

At gross weight, the YO-51 could, without flaps, take off after a run of 400 feet, while with full flaps the takeoff run would be only 75 feet, or just four feet more than twice its own length. The Dragonfly was capable of maintaining level flight at speeds as low as 30 miles per hour (48 km/h), and was claimed as being capable of landing in a distance shorter than the length of the aircraft itself.

== Operational history ==
Nicknamed the "flying motorcycle", three YO-51 aircraft were acquired by the United States Army Air Corps to take part in a fly-off evaluation against the Stinson YO-49 and Bellanca YO-50 to supply a new observation and liaison aircraft for use by the USAAC. The YO-51 was the heaviest of the three aircraft evaluated.

Although the Dragonfly was considered satisfactory during its flight testing, conducted at Wright Field in Ohio, the Stinson machine won the production contract, and no further YO-51s were built.

== Specifications ==
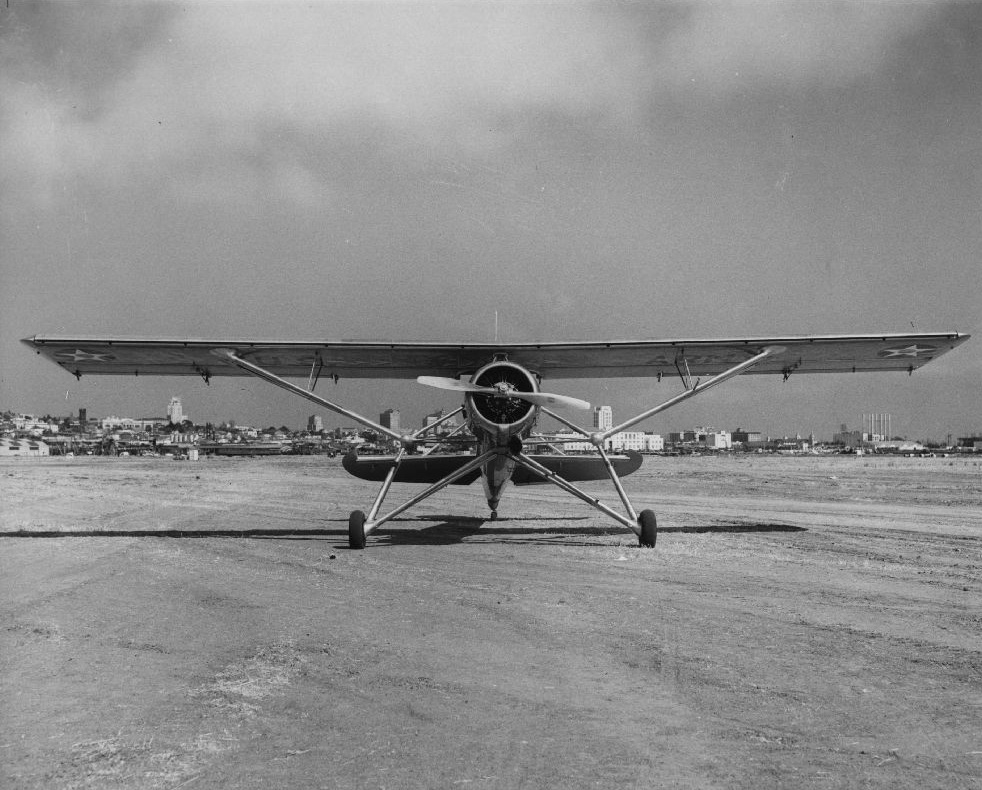
YO-51 on the ground

Data from Donald 1997

General characteristics

- Crew: two (pilot and observer)
- Length: 35 ft 6 in (10.82 m)
- Wingspan: 52 ft (16 m)
- Height: 11 ft 1 in (3.38 m)
- Gross weight: 4,206 lb (1,908 kg)
- Powerplant: 1 × Pratt & Whitney R-985-21 Wasp Junior radial, 440 hp (330 kW)

Performance

- Maximum speed: 129 mph (208 km/h, 112 kn)
- Cruise speed: 107 mph (172 km/h, 93 kn)
- Stall speed: 30 mph (48 km/h, 26 kn)

Armament

- None

== See also ==
Aircraft of comparable role, configuration, and era

- Bellanca YO-50
- Fieseler Fi 156 Storch
- Henschel Hs 126
- Kokusai Ki-76
- Polikarpov Po-2
- Repülőgépgyár_Levente_II
- Stinson L-1 Vigilant

Related lists

- List of military aircraft of the United States
