= Ryan Aeronautical =

American aeronautics company

Ryan Aeronautical Company
- Founded: 1934
- Founder: T. Claude Ryan
- Defunct: 1969/1999
- Fate: Merged with Teledyne
- Successor: Northrop Grumman
- Headquarters: San Diego, California

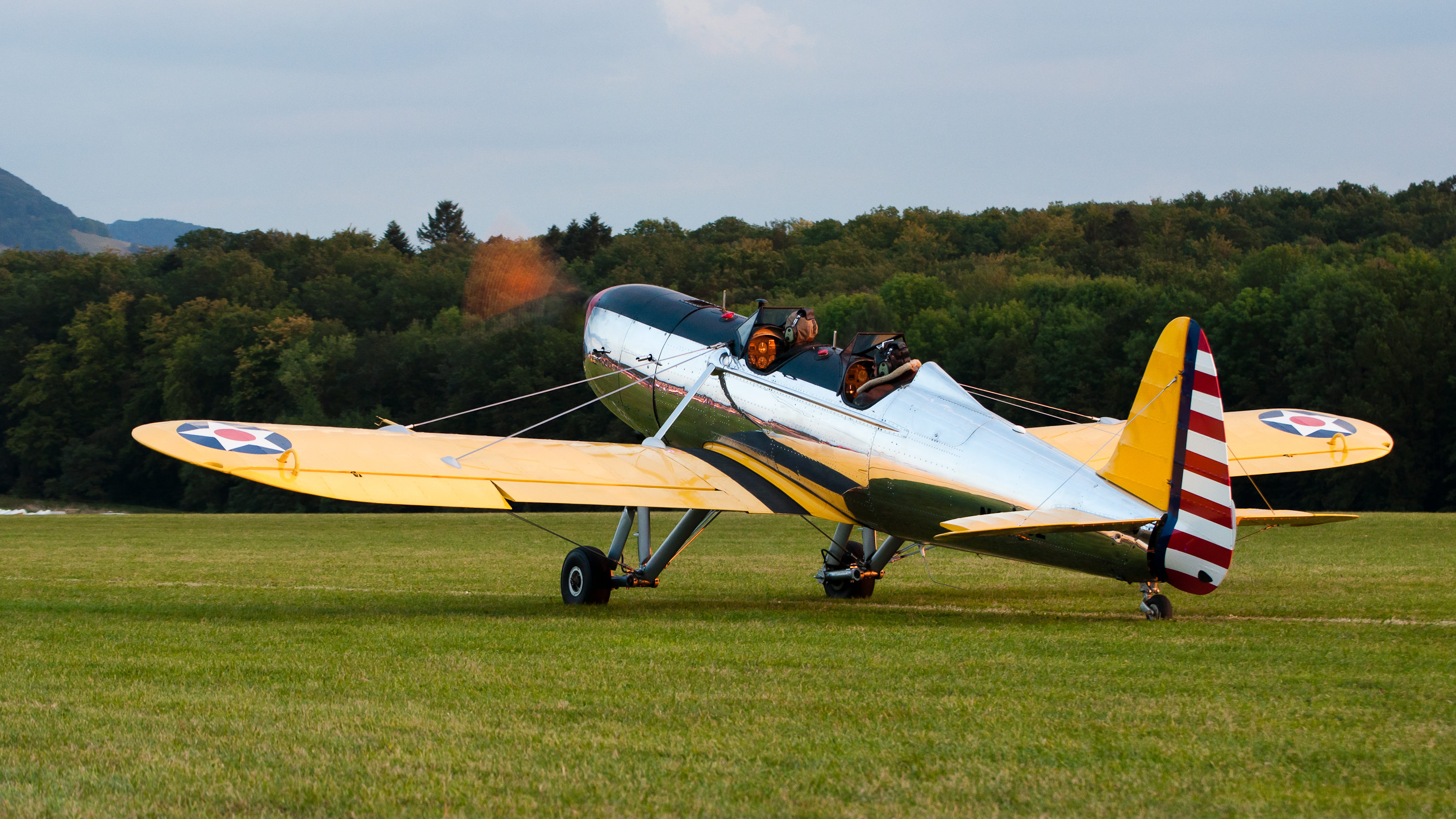
Ryan PT-22 Trainer

The Ryan Aeronautical Company was founded by T. Claude Ryan in San Diego, California, in 1934. It became part of Teledyne in 1969, and of Northrop Grumman when the latter company purchased Ryan in 1999. Ryan built several historically and technically significant aircraft, including four innovative V/STOL designs, but its most successful production aircraft was the Ryan Firebee line of unmanned drones used as target drones and unmanned air vehicles.

== History ==
=== Early history ===
In 1922, T.C. Ryan founded a flying service in San Diego that would lead to several aviation ventures bearing the Ryan name, including Ryan Airline Company founded in 1925.

T.C. Ryan, whose previous companies were best known for building Charles Lindbergh's transatlantic Spirit of St. Louis, actually had no part in building the famous aircraft. Ryan had been owner or partner in several previous companies, one of which also bore the name Ryan Aeronautical. The Spirit of St. Louis was not built by the final Ryan Aeronautical entity.

The new company's first aircraft was the S-T Sport Trainer, a low-wing tandem-seat monoplane with a 95 hp (71 kW) Menasco B-4 Pirate straight-4 engine. Five were built before production switched to the Ryan ST-A Aerobatic with a more powerful 125 hp (93 kW) Menasco C-4 in 1935. This aircraft now had enough power for aerobatic display, and it won the 1937 International Aerobatic Championships. A further improved ST-A Special was built in 1936, with a supercharged 150 hp (110 kW) Menasco C-4S.

In 1937 and 1938, a second civilian aircraft model was introduced, the S-C Sport Coupe, or SC-W with a 145 hp (108 kW) Warner Super Scarab radial engine. The SC-W was a larger three-seater aircraft with a sliding canopy and side-by-side front seating. The prototype SC-M was originally powered by a Menasco C-4 inline engine, however testing revealed that more power was needed. Thirteen examples of the SC-W were built, although the last one was assembled from surplus parts decades after the initial production run was finished.

=== USAAC trainers ===
Ryan Aeronautical Company logo (1960–1969)

Interest from the United States Army Air Corps followed. The Menasco engines proved unreliable, and instead Kinner radial engines were fitted. Aircraft were produced as the PT-16 (15 built); PT-20 (30 built); PT-21 (100 USAAF, 100 USN); and finally as the definitive PT-22 Recruit (1,048 built) ordered in 1941 as pilot training began its rapid expansion.

Ryan also pioneered STOL techniques in its YO-51 Dragonfly liaison and observation craft, but only three were built.

=== WW2 ===
The Ryan FR Fireball is an American mixed-power (piston and jet-powered) fighter aircraft designed by Ryan Aeronautical for the United States Navy during World War II. It was the Navy's first aircraft with a jet engine. Only 66 aircraft were built before Japan surrendered in August 1945. The FR-1 Fireball equipped a single squadron before the war's end, but did not see combat.

=== Postwar ===
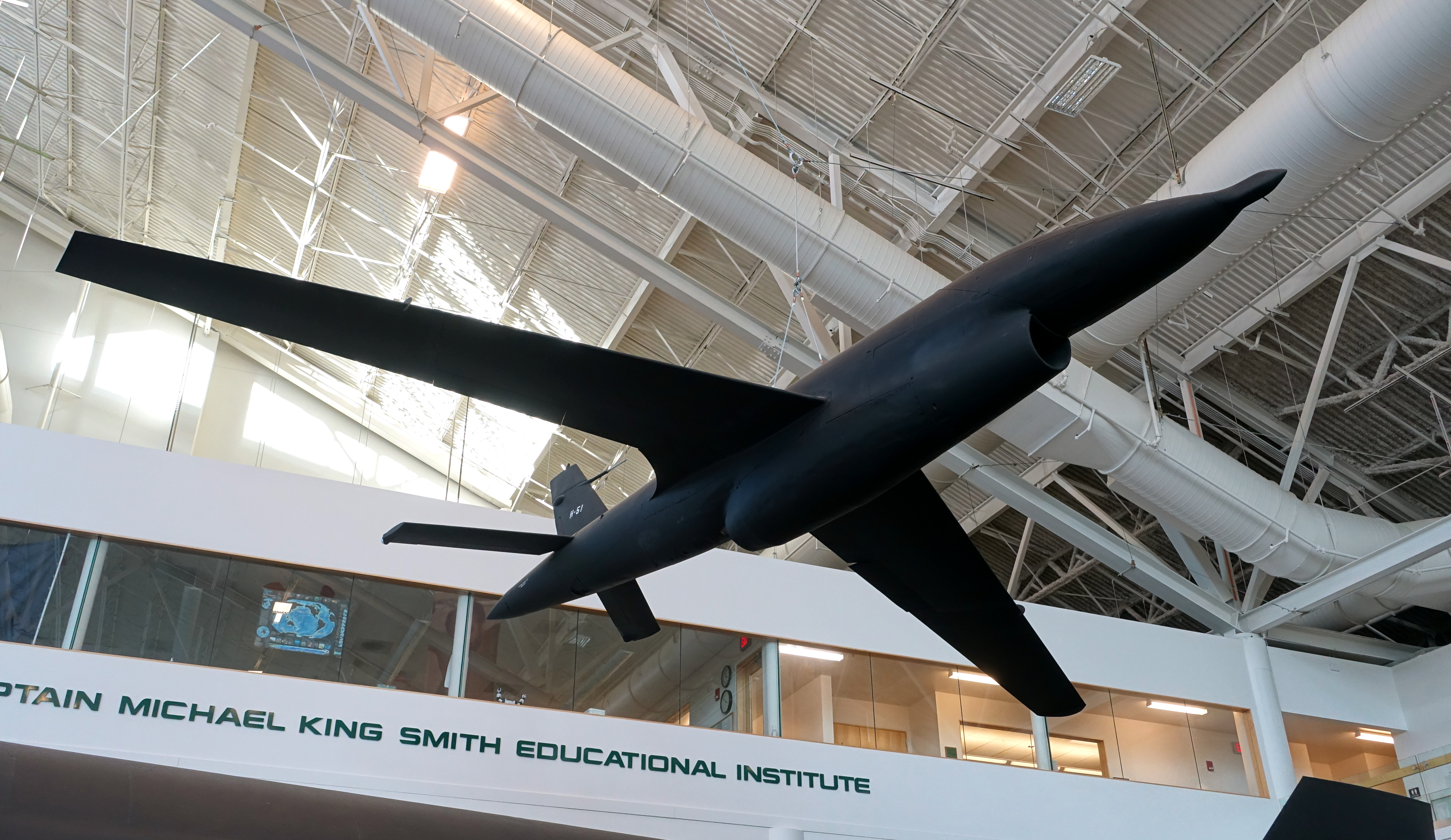
Ryan AQM-34N Firebee, 1962 - Evergreen Aviation & Space Museum - McMinnville, Oregon

In the immediate postwar years, Ryan bought the rights to the Navion light aircraft from North American Aviation, selling it to both military and civilian customers.

Ryan became involved in the missile and unmanned aircraft fields, developing the Ryan Firebee unmanned target drone, the Ryan Firebird (the first American air-to-air missile) among others, as well as a number of experimental and research aircraft.

Ryan acquired a 50% stake in Continental Motors Corporation, the aircraft-engine builder, in 1965.

In the 1950s, Ryan was a pioneer in jet vertical flight with the X-13 Vertijet, a tail-sitting jet with a delta wing which was not used in production designs. In the early 1960s, Ryan built the XV-5 Vertifan for the U.S. Army, which used wing- and nose-mounted lift vanes for V/STOL vertical flight. Other Ryan V/STOL designs included the VZ-3 Vertiplane.

Ryan developed the highly accurate radar system used on the Apollo Lunar Module.

In 1968, the company was acquired by Teledyne for $128 million and a year later became a wholly owned subsidiary of that company as Teledyne Ryan Aeronautical Company.

Northrop Grumman purchased Teledyne Ryan in 1999, with the products continuing to form the core of that firm's unmanned aerial vehicle efforts.

== Products ==
=== Aircraft ===
Model name	First flight	Number built	Type
Ryan M-1	1926	36	Mail plane
Ryan ST, PT-22 Recruit	1934	1994	Trainer
Ryan S-C	1937	14	Light passenger aircraft
Ryan YO-51 Dragonfly	1940	3	STOL scout
Ryan FR Fireball	1944	66	Piston-jet fighter
Ryan XF2R Dark Shark	1946	1	Turboprop fighter
Ryan Navion	1948	1202	Light passenger aircraft; military liaison
Ryan X-13 Vertijet	1955	2	Experimental vertical takeoff
Ryan Firebee	1955	xx	Target drone
Ryan VZ-3 Vertiplane	1959	1	Experimental V/STOL
Ryan Model 147	1960s		Drone
Ryan XV-8	1961	1	Flex wing
Ryan XV-5 Vertifan	1964	2	VTOL
Ryan AQM-91 Firefly	1968	28	Reconnaissance drone
Ryan YQM-98	1974		Reconnaissance drone
Teledyne Ryan Scarab	1988		Reconnaissance drone
Teledyne Ryan 410	1988		Reconnaissance drone
BQM-145 Peregrine	1992		Reconnaissance drone

=== Missiles ===
- AAM-A-1 Firebird
- ADM-160 MALD

== See also ==
- Ryan Airfield
