= Teledyne Ryan 410 =

Model 410

General information
- Type: Reconnaissance UAV
- National origin: United States
- Manufacturer: Teledyne Ryan

History
- First flight: 27 May 1988

The Teledyne Ryan Model 410 was a surveillance UAV designed in the United States in the late 1980s. In configuration, it was a high-wing cantilever monoplane with twin tails carried on booms and linked by a common horizontal stabilizer. The engine was mounted pusher-fashion at the rear of the fuselage, between the booms. The nosewheel of the tricycle undercarriage was retractable. Construction throughout was of composite materials.

In 1993, the Model 410 was submitted to the UAV Joint Projects Office in response to an RFP for a Tier II system. In January 1994, the contract was awarded to General Atomics for what would eventually become the RQ-1 Predator.

== Specifications ==
Data from Jane's All the World's Aircraft 1987–88, p. 982

General characteristics

- Crew: none
- Capacity: 300 lb (140 kg) sensor payload carried in internal bay
- Wingspan: 31 ft 0 in (9.45 m)
- Empty weight: 1,450 lb (657.7 kg)
- Powerplant: 1 × Lycoming TIO-320-C1B , 160 hp (120 kW)

Performance

- Range: 1,200 mi (1,931.2 km, 1,000 nmi)
- Endurance: 16 hours
