= Teledyne CAE F408 =

American turbofan engine

F408
- Type: Turbofan
- National origin: United States
- Manufacturer: Teledyne CAE
- First run: 1989
- Major applications: BQM-145 Peregrine

The Teledyne CAE F408 is an American turbofan engine developed for a number of UAVs, drones, and cruise missiles in the late 1980s.

== Design and development ==
The F408 (Model number 382-10) is a bypass turbofan whose fan stage is followed by a mixed-flow compressor, slinger-type combustor, and single-stage turbine. The turbine design is similar to that of the earlier Model 373-8B, while the compressor and fan are more advanced in design.

The development of the F408 began in 1985, with test runs beginning in 1989.

== Applications ==
- BQM-145 Peregrine
- Eclipse 500 (first prototype)

== Specifications ==
Data from

==== General characteristics ====
- Type: Turbofan
- Length: 32.1 in (81.5 cm)
- Diameter: 13.2 in (33.5 cm)
- Dry weight: 143.30 lb (65.8 kg)

==== Components ====
- Compressor: Mixed flow compressor
- Combustors: Slinger
- Turbine: Single stage high pressure turbine

==== Performance ====
- Maximum thrust: 998.69 lbf (4.44 kN)
- Specific fuel consumption: 1.2 lb/(lbf⋅h) or 34 g/(kN⋅s)
