= AAM-A-1 Firebird =

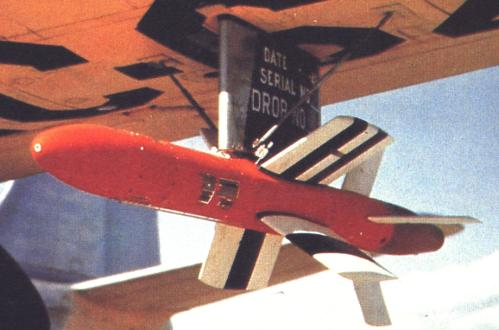
- Type: Air-to-air missile
- Place of origin: United States

Service history
- In service: Never entered service

Production history
- Designed: 1946-1947
- Manufacturer: Ryan Aeronautical Company

Specifications
- Mass: 260 pounds (120 kg)
- Length: 7 feet 6 inches (2.29 m)
- length: Booster, 1 foot 10 inches (0.56 m)
- Diameter: 8 inches (200 mm)
- Wingspan: 2 ft 8 in (0.81 m)
- Warhead: High explosive
- Warhead weight: 90 pounds (41 kg)
- Engine: Liquid-fuel rocket, 620 lb_{f} (2.8 kN); Booster, solid-fuel rocket, 2,800 lb_{f} (12 kN)
- Operational range: 8 miles (13 km)
- Maximum speed: Mach 0.85
- Guidance system: Midcourse: Radio command Terminal: Active radar homing
- Launch platform: DB-26 Invader; DF-82 Twin Mustang

The AAM-A-1 Firebird was an early American air-to-air missile, developed by the Ryan Aeronautical Company. The first air-to-air missile program developed for the United States Air Force, the Firebird was extensively tested in the late 1940s; although it proved successful in testing, it was soon obsolete due to the rapid advances in aircraft and missile technology at the time and did not enter production.

== Design and development ==
The AAM-A-1 project began in 1946 with the awarding of a study contract, under the designation MX-799, to the Ryan Aeronautical Company for the development of a subsonic air-to-air missile, which would be used by interceptor aircraft for the destruction of enemy bombers. A contract for the development of the missile, designated AAM-A-1 Firebird, was awarded in 1947.

The AAM-A-1 Firebird was a two-stage weapon, fitted with cruciform wings and tailfins. Control was by differential motion of the wings; the tailfins were fixed. The missile's fuselage was constructed from aluminum alloy, while the nosecone and control fins were molded from plastic. Firebird was fitted with a solid-fuel booster rocket providing initial thrust, before a liquid-fuel sustainer (Note: Some sources state the sustainer was also solid-fueled.) rocket ignited for a 15-second powered flight time.

Guidance was provided during midcourse flight by radio command, with an operator in the launching aircraft transmitting corrections to the missile. Terminal guidance used active radar homing, with a small radar set fitted in the nose of the missile, (Note: Some sources state the terminal guidance was semi-active radar homing.) with the missile's warhead being detonated by a proximity fuze, a backup impact fuze also being fitted.

== Operational history ==
Flight testing of the XAAM-A-1 prototype missiles began in October 1947, launched from DB-26 Invader bomber and DF-82 Twin Mustang aircraft, the latter of which could carry up to four missiles. The first air-to-air missile to reach the flight-test stage outside of World War II Nazi Germany, the Firebird proved to be reasonably successful in testing, with production being projected for the early 1950s; however its command-guidance system limited it to clear-weather, daytime use only.

Although radar beam riding guidance was planned to solve this, the subsonic speed of the weapon was also considered to be insufficient to avoid obsolescence; accordingly, the AAM-A-1's production program was terminated late in 1949, the Hughes Falcon being selected for development as the Air Force's standard intercept missile instead. The test program was considered to be successful, despite the rejection by the USAF, as a considerable amount of knowledge was gained that benefited later programs.

A Firebird missile is preserved at the Air Force Space & Missile Museum at Cape Canaveral Air Force Station in Florida.

== See also ==
- Ruhrstahl X-4, the similar-appearance wire-guided air-to-air missile design of Nazi Germany (1943–45)
