= Teledyne Ryan Scarab =

Type of aircraft

Model 324 Scarab

General information
- Type: Reconnaissance UAV
- National origin: United States
- Manufacturer: Teledyne Ryan
- Primary user: Egyptian Air Force
- Number built: ca 56

History
- First flight: 1988

The Teledyne Ryan Model 324 Scarab is a jet-powered reconnaissance UAV developed in the United States in the 1980s for sale to Egypt. The Scarab is a medium-range reconnaissance asset, similar in operational concept to the old Ryan FireFly UAVs, but implemented with improved technology. It was designed to Egyptian Air Force requirements, and was first flown in 1988. 56 were delivered and the type remains in service. It is a neat UAV with low-midbody-mounted swept wings, a twin-fin tail, and a rear-mounted Teledyne CAE 373-8C turbojet engine with the intake on the rear spine of the UAV. Launch is by RATO booster, and recovery by parachute. The aircraft's guidance is pre-programmed, but a radio-control backup system is provided.

== Specifications ==
General characteristics

- Crew: None
- Length: 20 ft 1 in (6.12 m)
- Wingspan: 11 ft 0 in (3.35 m)
- Gross weight: 2,500 lb (1,130 kg)
- Powerplant: 1 × Teledyne CAE 373 , 970 lbf (4.3 kN) thrust

Performance

- Maximum speed: 600 mph (970 km/h, 520 kn)
- Range: 1,400 mi (2,250 km, 1,200 nmi)
- Service ceiling: 43,000 ft (16,100 m)
