= Tiamat (yacht) =

Tiamat is a 40-foot racing yacht that sails out of Dublin Bay, Ireland under the burgee of the Dun Laoghaire Motor Yacht Club.

== Design ==
Tiamat was designed by Mark Mills for owner Tim Costello in 2004. She was designed to race competitively under the IRC rating system. Mark Mills has previously designed the DK46 (Yacht), the Mills 32 Aztec (Yacht) (now Raptor) & the Mills 36 Quokka (Yacht).

The hull, interior structure, and deck of Tiamat is built in foam cored Epoxy/E-glass, while the spinnaker pole and mast are carbon fibre. Mills has opted for a twin carbon wheel design rather than the standard single wheel as seen on most yachts of this size.

== Construction ==
Tiamat was constructed by [Vision Yachts] in Cowes, Isle of Wight. Vision Yachts have previously built Wahoo (Corby 41), Gloves Off (Corby 38) and many Kerr 11.3s.

Below decks has been designed by [Design Unlimited], the yacht interior design and styling house who are responsible for interiors of many modern super yachts. The boat is maintained by the team at Yacht Right Marine Services in Dublin.

== Notable Results ==
In May 2005 Tiamat won the Bell Lawrie Scottish Series, her first event following launching in May . Tiamat also won Class 1 Cowes Week.

In 2006, Tiamat teamed up with Andrew Allen and Colm Monahan's Belfast based J109 No Naked Flames and Eamonn Rohan's Corby 37, Blondie III, to form Ireland Team Green to compete in the Rolex Commodores' Cup. Team Green put in a very strong challenge but were beaten into second place by the French Blue Team in the final Offshore Race.

Only weeks before the Commodores' Cup, Tiamat won the 2006 Fortis IRC Championships with 7 race wins, claiming the RORC IRC Championship Trophy

In 2007, Tiamat won the French IRC Nationals in Deauville, France, winning all 8 races in Class 0. This was followed up by a second place at the Irish National Championships in Cork.
