= AIM-4 Falcon =

American air-to-air missile

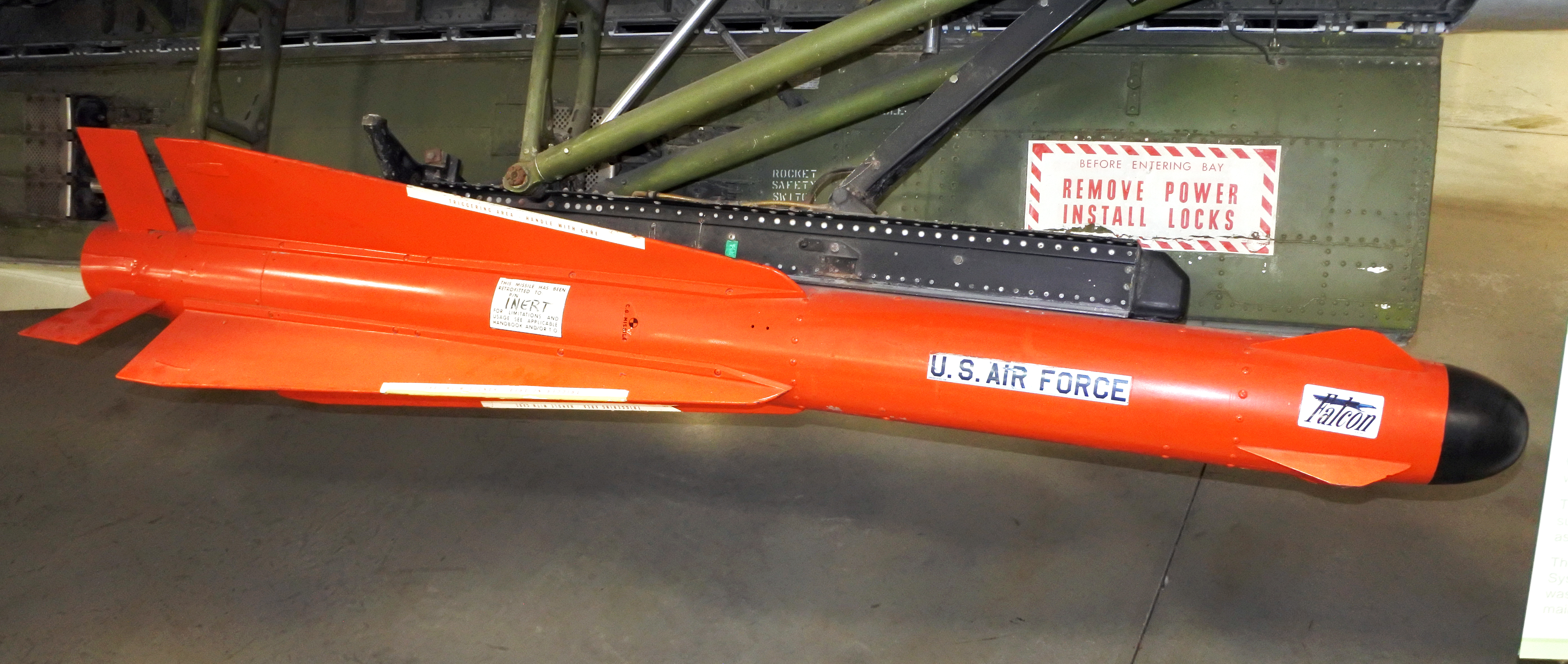
- AIM-4A Falcon
- Type: Air-to-air missile
- Place of origin: United States

Service history
- In service: 1956–88

Production history
- Manufacturer: Hughes Aircraft

Specifications
- Length: 1.98 m (6 ft 6 in)
- Diameter: 163 mm (6.4 in)
- Wingspan: 508 mm (20.0 in)
- Warhead: 3.4 kg (7.5 lb)
- Propellant: solid fuel rocket
- Operational range: 9.7 km (6.0 mi)
- Maximum speed: Mach 3
- Guidance system: semi-active radar homing and Tail-chase engagement infrared homing

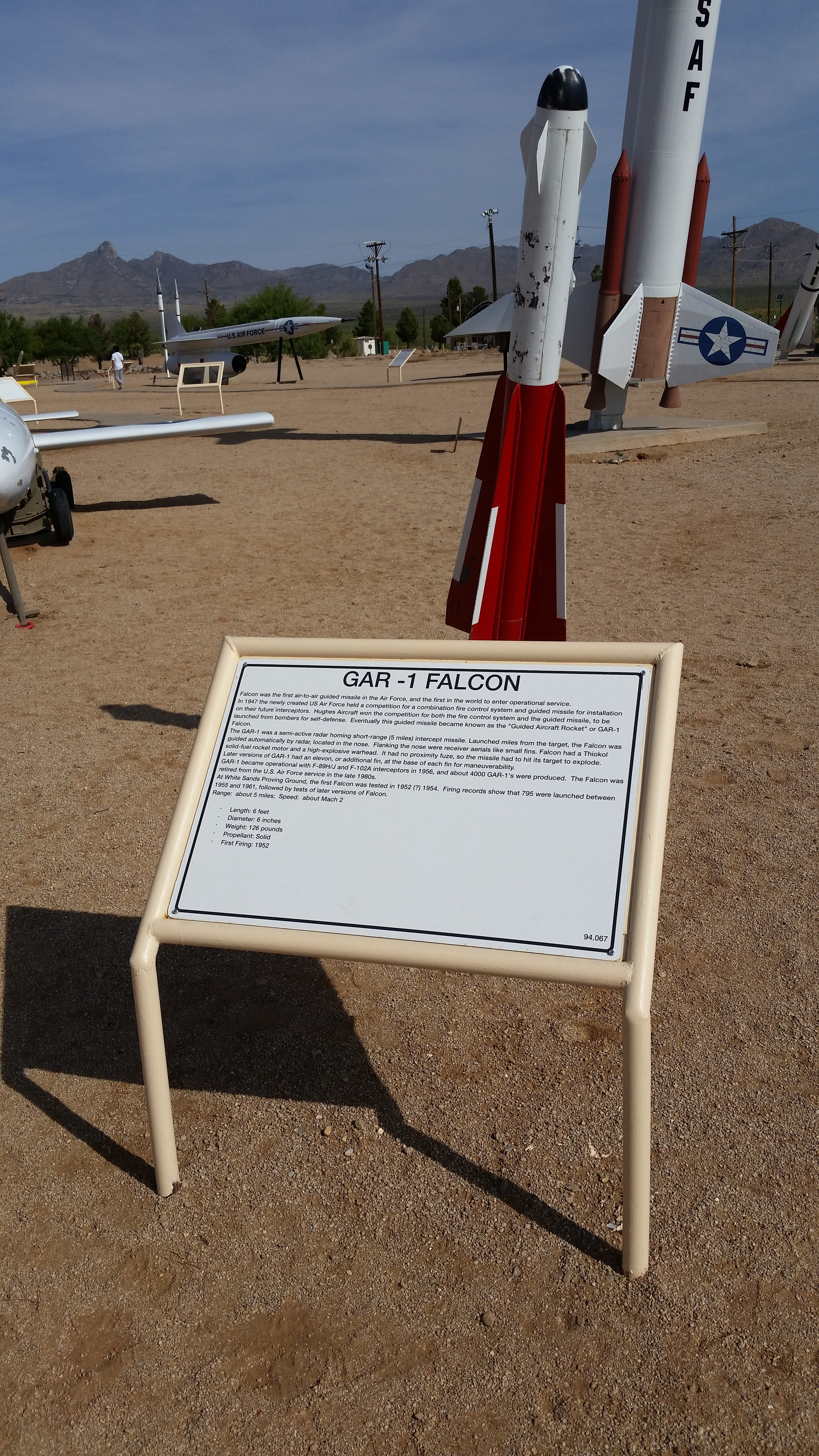
White Sands Missile Range Museum GAR-1 Falcon display

The Hughes AIM-4 Falcon was the first operational guided air-to-air missile of the United States Air Force. Development began in 1946; the weapon was first tested in 1949. The missile entered service with the USAF in 1956.

Produced in both infrared and radar-guided variants, the missile served during the Vietnam War with USAF McDonnell Douglas F-4 Phantom II units. Designed to shoot down slow bombers with limited maneuverability, it was ineffective against maneuverable fighters over Vietnam. Lacking proximity fusing, the missile would detonate only on direct impact. Only five kills were recorded.

With the AIM-4's poor kill record rendering the F-4D ineffective in air-to-air combat, the fighters were modified to carry the AIM-9 Sidewinder missile instead, which was already carried by USAF F-4Cs, USN and USMC F-4 Phantom II, and F-8 Crusader jet fighters. The Sidewinder was more effective in the fighter vs fighter role on the F-4 platform, and improved versions continue to serve the armed forces of the United States and numerous nations to this day.

== Development ==
=== Defensive concept ===
Development of a guided air-to-air missile began in 1946. Hughes Aircraft was awarded a contract for a subsonic missile under the project designation MX-798, which soon gave way to the supersonic MX-904 in 1947.

The original purpose of the weapon was as a self-defense weapon for bomber aircraft, which would carry a magazine of three missiles in the rear fuselage, and fire them through a long tube that led through the area that normally held the tail turret. In the case of the B-52, the missile contained a tuner for the bomber's A-3 rear-facing radar, and would follow the signal being reflected off the target aircraft using a semi-active radar homing (SARH) system.

=== Anti-bomber development ===
Soon after the original MX-798 was released, a specification for a forward-firing missile for fighter aircraft was issued which led to the MX-799. It advanced to testing prototype rounds, designated AAM-A-1 Firebird, but its subsonic speed and manual guidance soon proved to be serious problems.

The project was cancelled, and the recently released MX-904 was redirected to replace Firebird in the anti-bomber role. At this stage, the weapon was still designed to be fired out of a tube, now leading from a weapon bay behind the nose-mounted radar, with the launch tube exiting below the radar antenna. Instead of a magazine with multiple missiles, three missiles were placed in the tube tip-to-tail.

Housing in a tube presented several problems, but primary among them was that there was no way for the missile's seeker to lock on before launch. The original concept would be firing against interceptor aircraft that were slowly approaching the B-52 and would be somewhere fairly close to directly behind the aircraft. In the case of a fighter, the target might not be so conveniently located, and with no way to know if it could see the target while inside the tube, this meant it might never lock on properly.

Eventually, it was decided to abandon the tube-launched concept and mount the missile on the wings or in weapon bays that would point the missile at the target prior to launch. This change also allowed the seeker to use infrared homing as well as SARH. Interchangeable seekers were developed, allowing an aircraft to carry either type, or both. Additionally, freed from the tube, the missile's wings were allowed to grow larger and took on the long delta form that it and its various descendants would carry into the 2000s.

=== Testing and service ===
The first test firings took place in 1949, at which time it was designated AAM-A-2 and given the popular name Falcon. A brief policy of assigning fighter and bomber designations to missiles led it to be redesignated F-98 in 1951. In 1955, the policy changed again, and the missile was again redesignated GAR-1.

The initial GAR-1 and GAR-2 models entered service in 1956. It armed the Northrop F-89 Scorpion, McDonnell F-101B Voodoo and Convair F-102 Delta Dagger and F-106 Delta Dart interceptors. The only other users were Canada, Finland, Sweden and Switzerland, whose CF-101 Voodoo, Saab 35 Draken and Dassault Mirage IIIS carried the Falcon. Canada also hoped to use them on the Avro Canada CF-105 Arrow interceptor; however, this was never realized because of the Arrow's cancellation.

Fighters carrying the Falcon were often designed with internal weapons bays for carrying this missile. The Scorpion carried them on wingtip pods, while the Delta Dagger and Delta Dart had belly bays with a trapeze mechanism to move them into the airstream for launch. The F-101B had an unusual bay arrangement where two were stored externally, and then the bay door would rotate to expose two more missiles. It is likely the General Dynamics F-111's internal bay would have accommodated the missile as well, but by the time of service the Air Force had already dropped the Falcon for use against fighters, as well as the idea of using the F-111 as an air combat fighter.

The GAR-1 had semi-active radar homing (SARH), giving a range of about 5 mi (8.0 km). About 4,000 missiles were produced. It was replaced in production by the GAR-1D (later AIM-4A), with larger control surfaces. About 12,000 of this variant were produced, the major production version of the SARH Falcon.

The GAR-2 (later AIM-4B) was a heat-seeker, generally limited to rear-aspect engagements, but with the advantage of being a 'fire and forget' weapon. As would also be Soviet practice, it was common to fire the weapon in salvos of both types to increase the chances of a hit (a heat-seeking missile fired first, followed moments later by a radar-guided missile). The GAR-2 was about 1.5 in (40 mm) longer and 16 lb (7 kg) heavier than its SARH counterpart. Its range was similar. It was replaced in production by the GAR-2A (later AIM-4C), with a more sensitive infrared seeker. A total of about 26,000 of the infrared-homing Falcons were built.

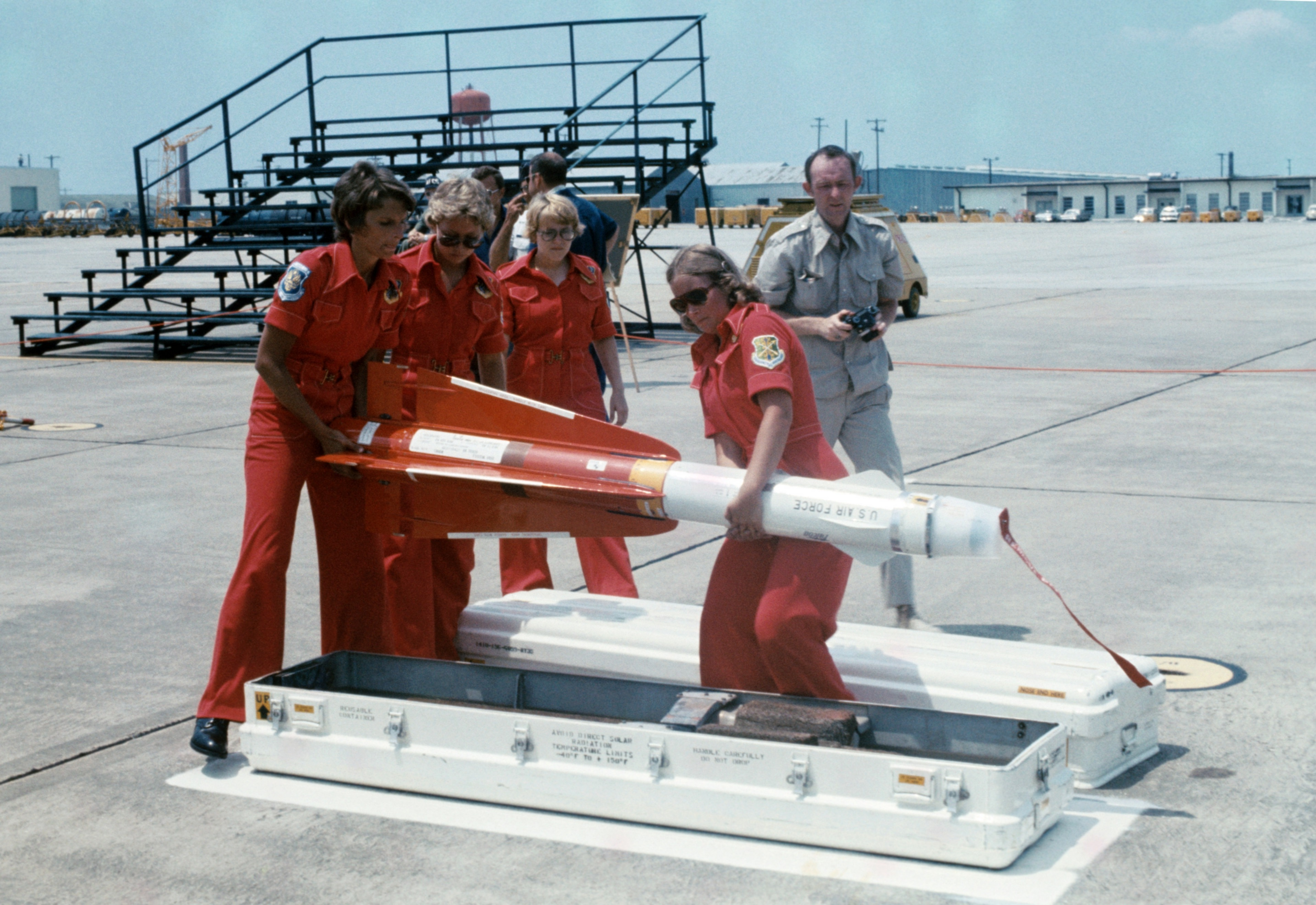
119th Fighter Wing weapons handlers with an AIM-4C, 1972.

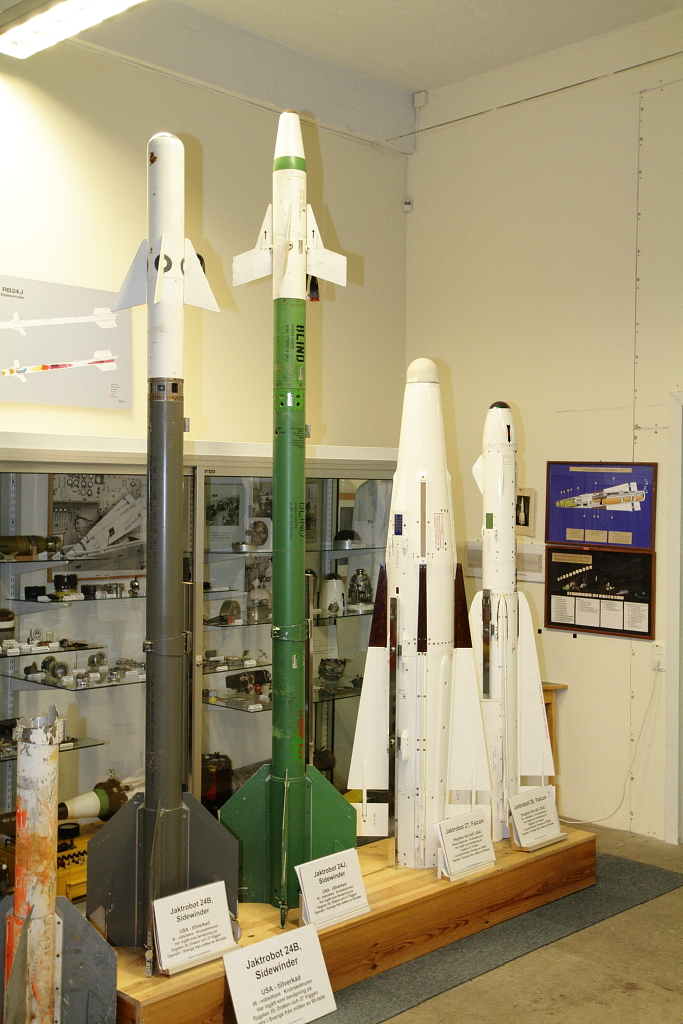
AIM-9B and J next to HM-55 and HM-58 All used by the Swedish Air Force

All of the early Falcons had a small 7.6 lb (3.4 kg) warhead, limiting their lethal radius. Also limiting them tactically was that Falcon lacked a proximity fuze: the fuzing for the missile was in the leading edges of the wings, requiring a direct hit to detonate.

In 1958, Hughes introduced a slightly enlarged version of the Falcon, initially dubbed Super Falcon, with a more powerful, longer-burning rocket engine, increasing speed and range. It had a larger warhead (28.7 lb / 13 kg) and better guidance systems. The SARH versions were GAR-3 (AIM-4E) and the improved GAR-3A (AIM-4F). The infrared version was the GAR-4A (AIM-4G). About 2,700 SARH missiles and 3,400 IR Super Falcons were produced, replacing most earlier versions of the weapon in service.

The Falcon was redesignated AIM-4 in September 1962.

The final version of the original Falcon was the GAR-2B (later AIM-4D), which entered service in 1963. This was intended as a fighter combat weapon, combining the lighter, smaller airframe of the earlier GAR-1/GAR-2 weapon with the improved IR seeker of the GAR-4A/AIM-4G.

An effort to address the limitations of AIM-4D led to the development in 1970 of the XAIM-4H, which had a laser proximity fuze, new warhead, and better maneuverability. It was cancelled the following year without entering service.

A larger version of the Falcon carrying a 0.25-kiloton nuclear warhead was developed as the GAR-11 (later designated the AIM-26 Falcon), while a long-range version was developed for the North American XF-108 Rapier and Lockheed YF-12 interceptors as the GAR-9 (later AIM-47 Falcon).

== Operational history ==
The Air Force deployed AIM-4 in May 1967 during the Vietnam War on the new F-4D Phantom II, which carried it on the inner wing pylons and was not wired to carry the AIM-9 Sidewinder. The missile's combat performance was very poor. The Falcon, already operational on Air Defense Command aircraft, was designed to be used against bombers, and its slow seeker cooling times (as much as six or seven seconds to obtain a lock on a target) rendered it largely ineffective against maneuvering fighters. Moreover, it could be cooled only once. Limited coolant supply meant that once cooled, the missile would expend its supply of liquid nitrogen in two minutes, rendering it useless on the rail. The missile also had a small warhead, and lacked proximity fusing. As a result, only five kills were scored, all with the AIM-4D version. (The Falcon was also experimentally fired by the F-102 Delta Dagger against ground targets at night using its infrared seeker.)

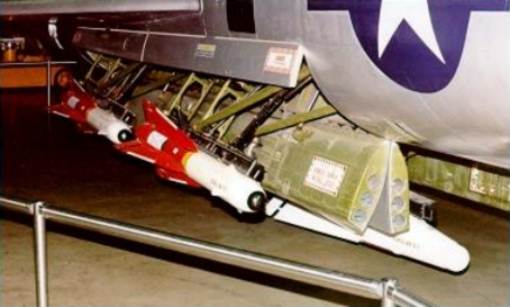
A pair of AIM-4D Falcons in the weapons bay of an F-102 Delta Dagger

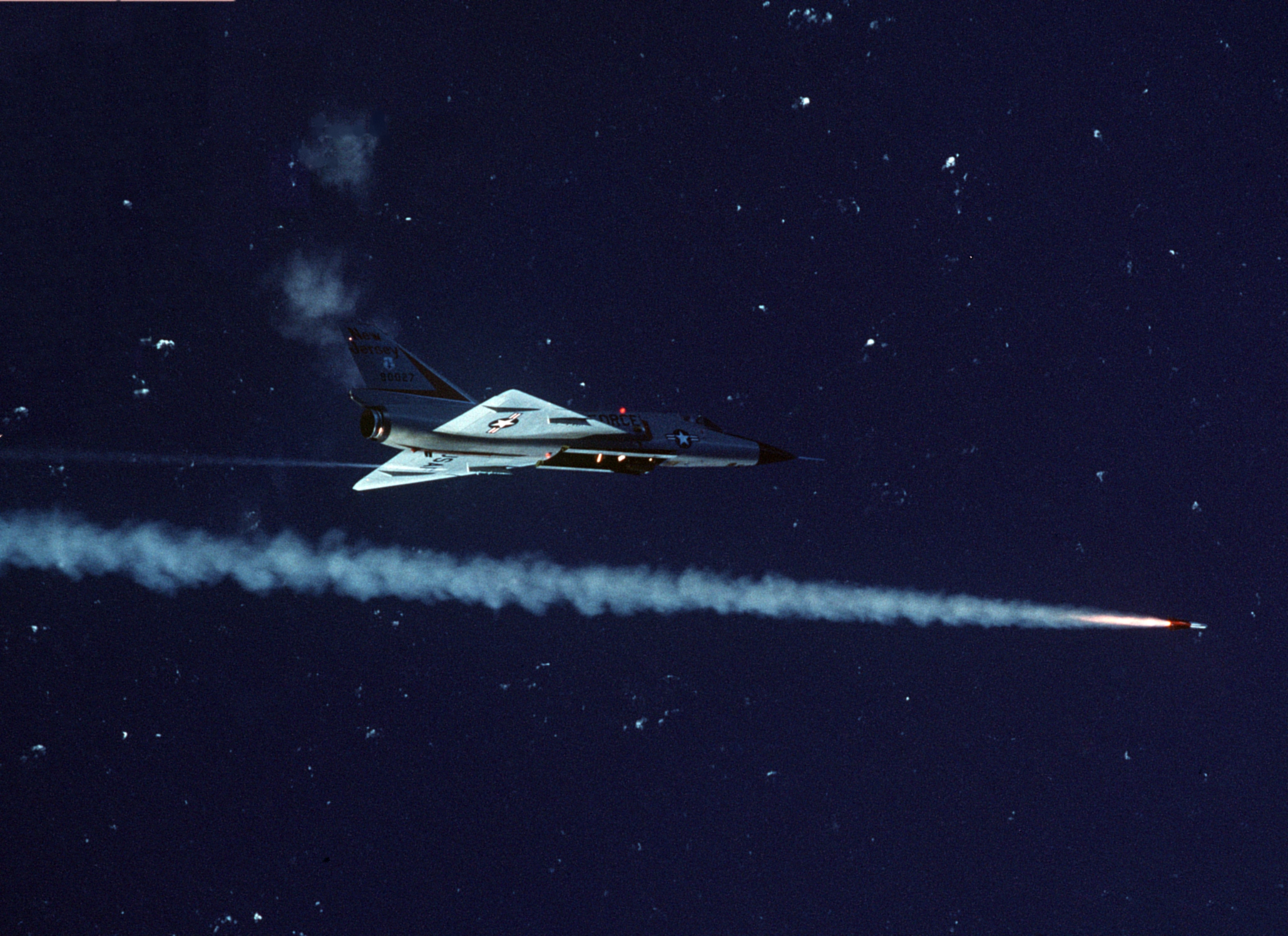
A New Jersey ANG F-106A launching an AIM-4, 1984.

The weapon was unpopular with pilots from the onset and was supplemented or partially withdrawn in 1969, to be replaced in the F-4D by the Sidewinder after retrofitting the proper wiring. Colonel Robin Olds, USAF, commanding the F-4D-equipped 8th Tactical Fighter Wing, was an outspoken critic of the missile and said of it:

By the beginning of June, we all hated the new AIM-4 Falcon missiles. I loathed the damned useless things. I wanted my Sidewinders back. In two missions I had fired seven or eight of the bloody things and not one guided. They were worse than I had anticipated. Sometimes they refused to launch; sometimes they just cruised off into the blue without guiding. In the thick of an engagement with my head twisting and turning, trying to keep track of friend and foe, I'd forget which of the four I had (already) selected and couldn't tell which of the remaining was perking and which head was already expiring on its launch rail. Twice upon returning to base I had the tech rep go over the switchology and firing sequences. We never discovered I was doing anything wrong.

Colonel Olds became exasperated with the Falcon's poor combat performance. He ordered his entire fighter wing to rewire the F-4Ds to carry more reliable AIM-9 Sidewinders. Although it was an unauthorized field modification, the entire air force eventually followed his example.

=== Vietnam War: U.S. AIM-4 Falcon Air to Air Victories ===
Used from 1965 through 1972 in Vietnam, Falcons achieved their only kills during Operation Rolling Thunder (1965–68) , with only 5 successful hits scored after 54 launches in aerial combat.

Date	Missile Firing Aircraft	AIM-4 Falcon Model	Downed Aircraft	Operating Unit
26 Oct 1967	F-4D Phantom II	AIM-4D	MiG-17	USAF 555th Tactical Fighter Squadron (TFS)
17 Dec 1967	F-4D Phantom II	AIM-4D	MiG-17	13th TFS
03 Jan 1968	F-4D Phantom II	AIM-4D	MiG-17	435th TFS
18 Jan 1968	F-4D Phantom II	AIM-4D	MiG-17	435th TFS
05 Feb 1968	F-4D Phantom II	AIM-4D	MiG-21	13th TFS

The AIM-4 was also produced as the HM-55S (radar-guided) for the Swiss Air Force for use on the Dassault Mirage IIIS, and license-manufactured in Sweden for the Swedish Air Force (as the Rb 28) to equip the Saab 35 Draken and 37 Viggen. The seeker of the missile was also redesigned.

The AIM-4F/AIM-4G Super Falcon remained in USAF and ANG service, primarily with Convair F-102 Delta Dagger and F-106 Delta Dart interceptors, until the final retirement of the F-106 in 1988. These aircraft had been designed to carry the weapon and could not be easily converted to carry larger weapons like the AIM-9 Sidewinder or AIM-7 Sparrow, which were much longer.

== Operators ==
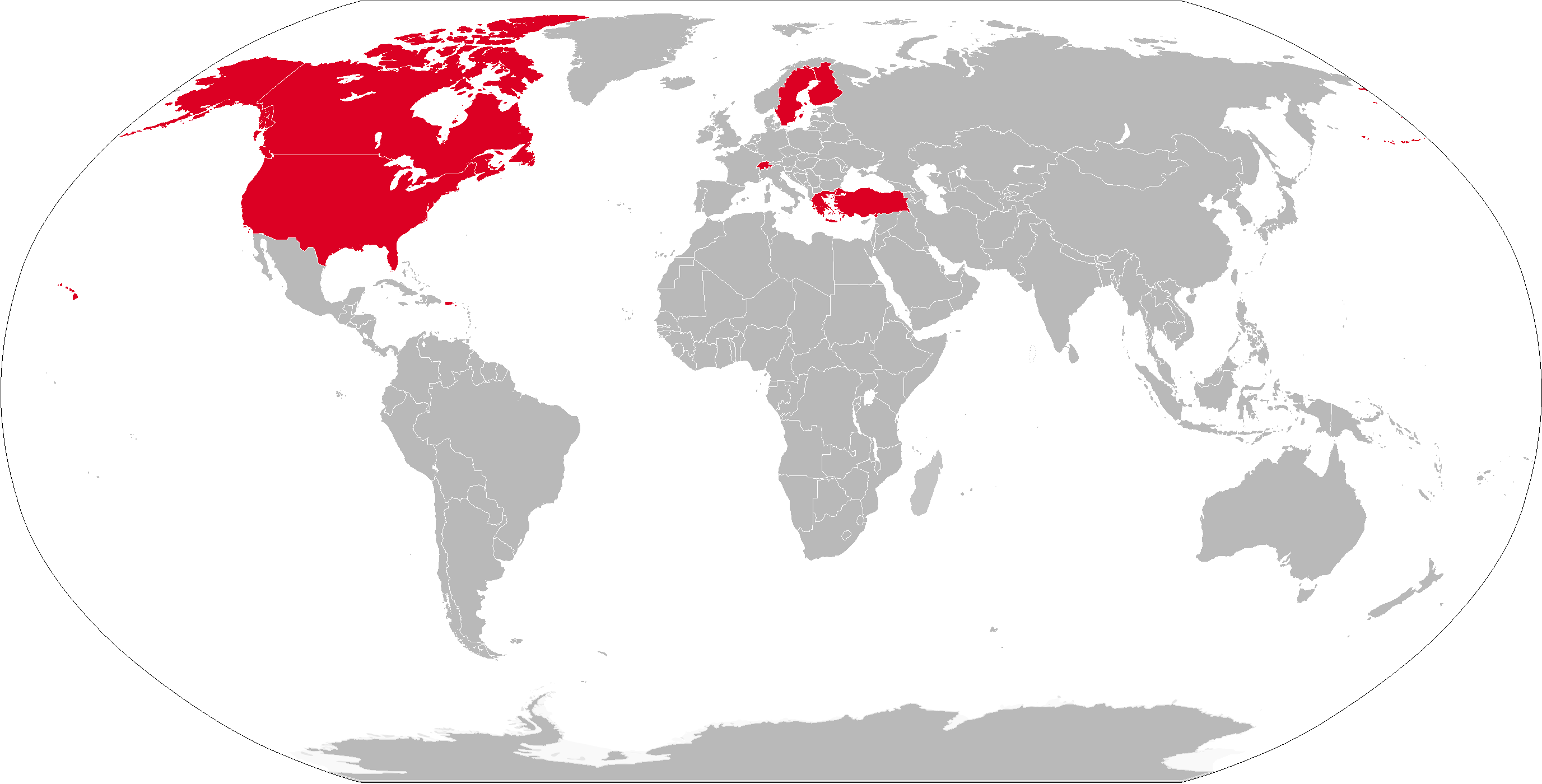
Map with former AIM-4 operators in red

=== Former operators ===
Canada

- Royal Canadian Air Force
- Canadian Forces

Finland

- Finnish Air Force – (Swedish-built missiles)

Greece

- Hellenic Air Force

Sweden

- Swedish Air Force – (Licence built by SAAB)

Switzerland

- Swiss Air Force

Turkey

- Turkish Air Force

United States

- United States Air Force

== Specifications (GAR-1D/ -2B / AIM-4C/D) ==
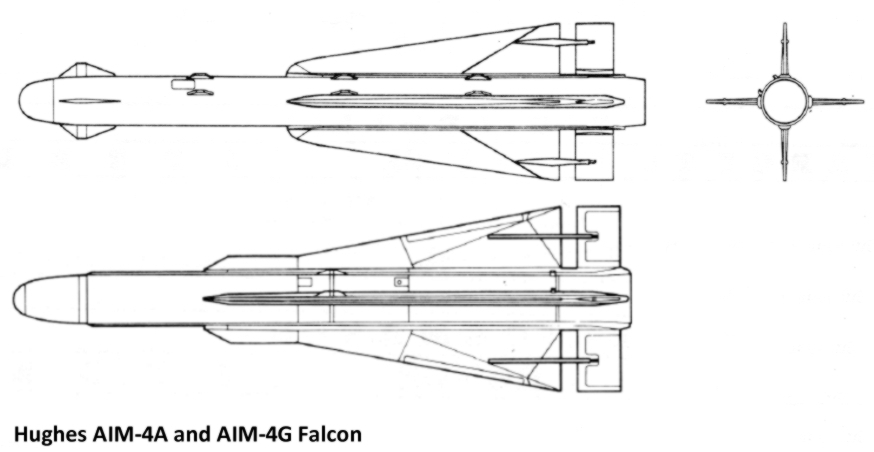

- Length: 78 in (2.0 m) / 79.5 in (2.02 m)
- Wingspan: 20 in (510 mm)
- Diameter: 6.4 in (160 mm)
- Weight: 119 lb (54 kg) / 135 lb (61 kg)
- Speed: Mach 3
- Range 6 mi (9.7 km)
- Guidance: semi-active radar homing / rear-aspect infrared homing
- Warhead: 7.6 lb (3.4 kg) high explosive

== See also ==
Related Development:

- AIM-26 Falcon
- AIM-47 Falcon
- AIM-54 Phoenix
- AGM-65 Maverick
