= Big Bud 747 =

Large farm tractor

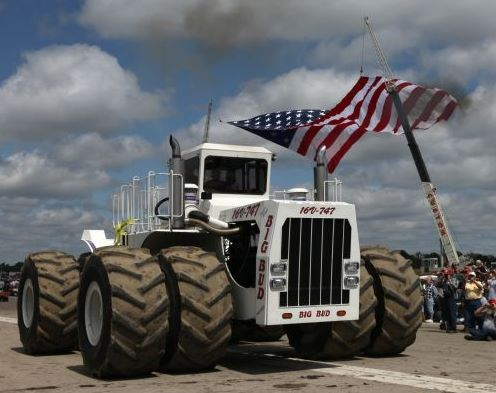
Big Bud 747

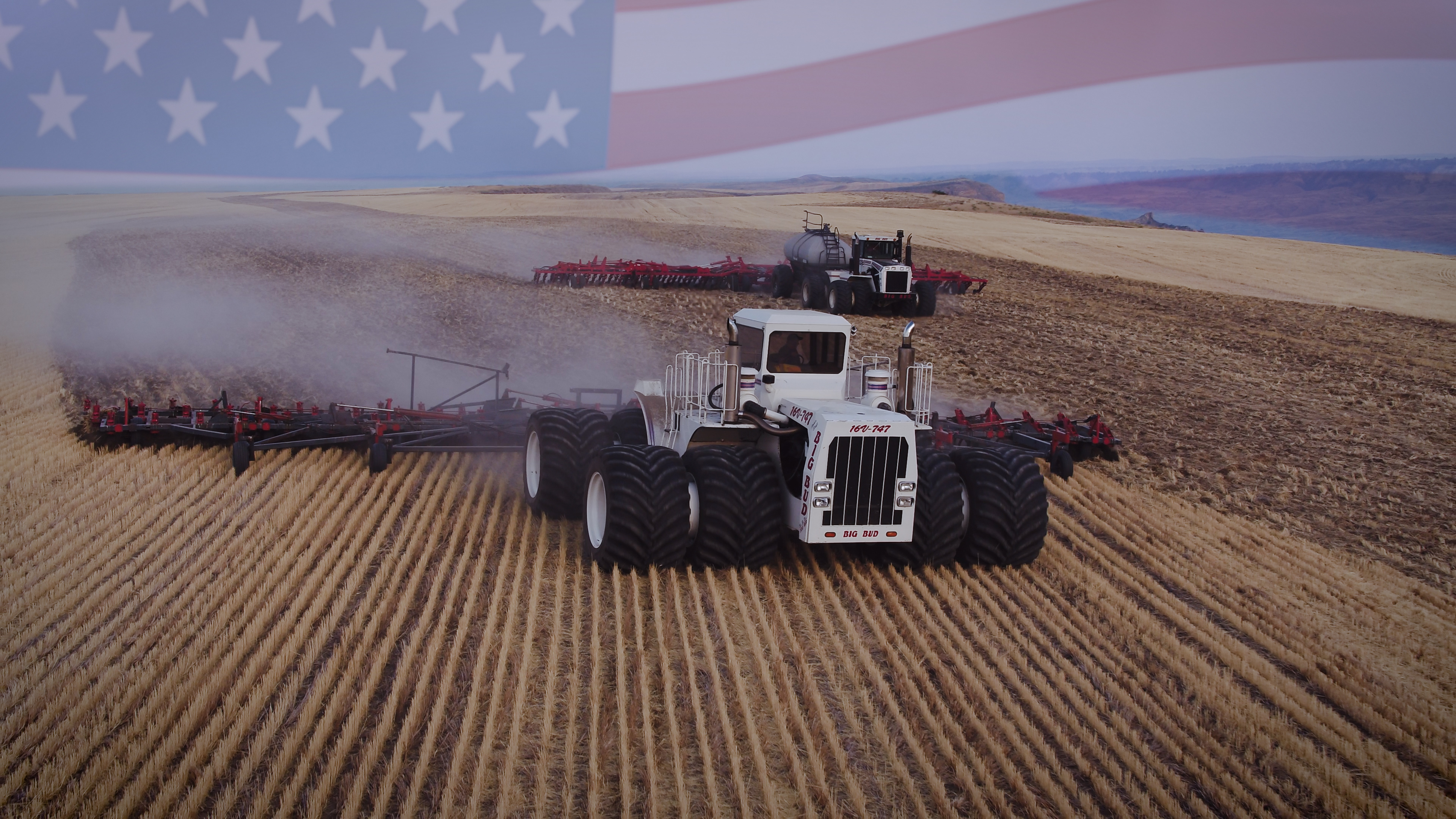
The Big Bud 747 pulls an 80-foot (25 meter) wide FRIGGSTAD chisel plow across a field in Central Montana. A Big Bud 540 with an air drill follows on the next pass.

The Big Bud 747 or 16V-747 Big Bud is a large, custom-made farm tractor built in Havre, Montana, in 1977. It has 1100 horsepower. It is billed by the owners and exhibitors as the "World's Largest Farm Tractor". It is about twice the size of many of the largest production tractors in the world, depending on parameter.

== History ==
The first two Big Bud tractors out of the Havre, Montana plant were the 250-series and were purchased by Leonard M. Semenza of Semenza Farms in 1968 located between Fort Benton, Montana, and Chester, Montana on his 35,000 acre farm. The 747 tractor was designed by Wilbur Hensler and built by Ron Harmon and the employees of his Northern Manufacturing Company, at a cost of $300,000. It was made for the Rossi Brothers, Elmer and Melvin, cotton farmers of Bakersfield or Old River, California. The tractor was used on the 20,000 acre Rossi Brothers farm for eleven years; it was then purchased by Willowbrook Farms of Indialantic, Florida. Both farms used it for deep ripping.

In 1997, after a period of disuse, it was purchased by Robert and Randy Williams, of Big Sandy, Montana, within 60 miles (97 km) of where it was built. It was used on the Williams Brothers' farm in Chouteau County to pull an 80-foot (24 m)[cultivator][World Record is 113-foot (34.5m) that was pulled by a Caterpillar D9 by Leonard M. Semenza], covering 1.3 acres (0.53 ha) per minute at a speed up to 8 miles per hour (13 km/h).

The United Tire Company of Canada, which made the tractor's custom 8-foot (2.4 m) tires, went bankrupt in 2000, partially contributing to the decision to stop using the tractor for regular work in July 2009, and to move the Big Bud 747 to museums.

After its work on the farm, it was displayed at the Heartland Acres Agribition Center in Independence, Iowa. In 2014, the Big Bud 747 was moved to the Heartland Museum in Clarion, Iowa, on indefinite loan from the Williams Brothers; the museum constructed a separate shed for the tractor in 2013.

On July 14, 2020, the Big Bud's original eight-foot tall construction tires were replaced with Goodyear LSW1400/30r46 tires (which are slightly under seven feet tall), with new rims provided by the Williams Brothers to fit them. The new tires brought the width of the Big Bud to just over 25 feet.

The Big Bud 747 returned to the Williams Brothers farm near Big Sandy, Montana in September 2020, where it worked farm ground once again with an 80-foot wide FRIGGSTAD chisel plow.

== Statistics ==
These stats mostly reflect the tractor's earlier specifications with the original 8-foot high (2.44 meter) bias ply tires, which were replaced with shorter and wider tires closer to a 7 foot height (2.1 meters) when the tractor was revived in the late 2010s.

=== General ===
- Height: 14 feet (4.3 m) to top of cab New tires are about 1 foot (0.30 m) shorter than original tires.
- Length: 27 feet (8.2 m) frame; 28 feet 6 inches (8.69 m) to end of drawbar
- Width: 13 feet 4 inches (4.06 m) over fenders; 25 feet 6 inches (7.77 m) over duals
- Wheelbase: 16 feet 3 inches (4.95 m)
- Tires: 8 feet (2.4 m) in diameter; 39.6 inches (1,010 mm) in width; (38×35 16 ply duals)
- Weight: 95,000 pounds (48 short tons; 95,000 lb) shipping weight; over 100,000 pounds (50 short tons; 100,000 lb) when 1,000-U.S.-gallon (3,800 L; 830 imp gal) tank is full; 135,000 pounds (68 short tons; 135,000 lb) fully ballasted

=== Tank capacities ===
- Fuel capacity: 1,000 US gal (830 imp gal; 3,800 L) (diesel fuel)
- Hydraulic reservoir: 150 US gal (120 imp gal; 570 L) tank

=== Engine ===
- Detroit Diesel 16V92T: 16-cylinder, two-cycle engine
- Power: originally 760 horsepower (570 kW), but later increased to 860 horsepower (640 kW), then to 960 horsepower (720 kW) but is now at 1,100 horsepower (820 kW).
- Displacement: 1,472 cu in (24.12 L), or 92 cu in (1.51 L) per cylinder
- Induction: 2 turbochargers, 2 superchargers
- Starter: 24 volts; all other electrical is 12 volts
- Alternator: 75 ampere

=== Transmission ===
- Forward speeds: 6
- Reverse speeds: 1
- Torque: 3,100 lb⋅ft (4,200 N⋅m) at 3401 rpm

=== Other ===
- Cab features: Air conditioner; heater; windshield wipers; swivel bucket seat plus buddy seat; AM/FM radio; 8-track stereo system (made in 1977).

== Comparison ==
For perspective, many of the largest production tractors such as the 2010 John Deere 9630 are about half the horsepower, less than half the ballasted weight, and often use a more standard inline six-cylinder engine similar to those used in class 8 semi trucks.

By the 2020s, several new tractors over 600 horsepower (450 kW) were released. Though their overall weight is much less, some reached or exceeded the original 750 horsepower the Big Bud 747 initially had. These include the 700-horsepower (520 kW) Fendt 1167 with a low rpm engine, Case 715 Quadtrac with over 700 horsepower released in 2023, and the John Deere 830, with 830 nominal horsepower, and a boost to 913 horsepower.

A new Big Bud 700 was built in 2023 with an 18 litre engine and nearly 700 horsepower. In 2025, John Deere built a tractor with their own 18 litre engine and over 800 horsepower.
