= Vertical damp proof barrier =

The purpose of a Vertical Damp Proof Barrier is to prevent the ingress of damp and water into subterranean structures such as basements, cellars, tunnels and earth shielded buildings (also known as Earth sheltered buildings). Traditionally, this took the form of several coats of bitumous paint or tar. This, though cheap, has the disadvantage that any movement in the structure or joints is likely to rupture the paint so allowing water to enter.

== Solutions ==
Modern solutions take the form of a plastic membrane, often pre-coated with adhesive and a "peel off" paper that is applied to the outside of the structure before it is buried. Usually, a "priming coat" of bitumous paint has to be applied first. It often comes in one metre wide rolls and is installed with a 100 mm overlap. The membrane has a high modulus of elasticity (that is, it stretches a lot, often by a factor of ten before it ruptures).

== Precautions ==
Precautions have to be taken that sharp objects in the backfill do not pierce it. Sometimes fine sand is used to backfill but more often insulation boards are laid against it before backfilling, particularly in an inhabited room. As a further precaution against water ingress, it is recommended that land drains be installed behind the protected wall at its base to prevent the buildup of hydrostatic pressure in wet weather.

== See also ==
- Nanotextured surface
- Basement waterproofing
- Dry rot treatment
