= Pipe-and-cable-laying plough =

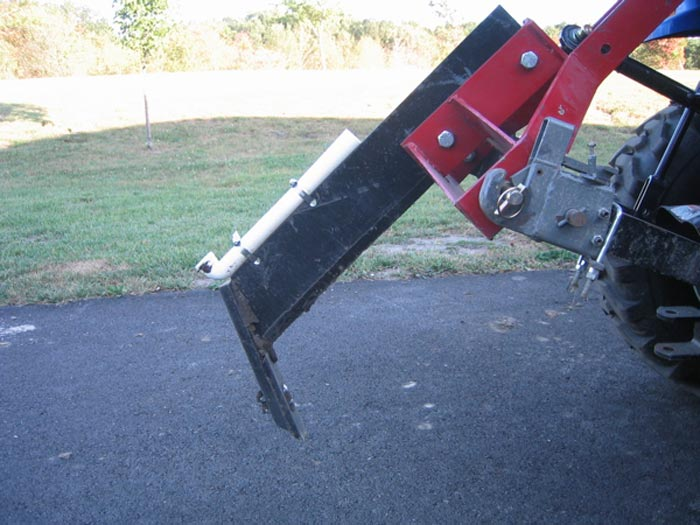
A simple cable plough

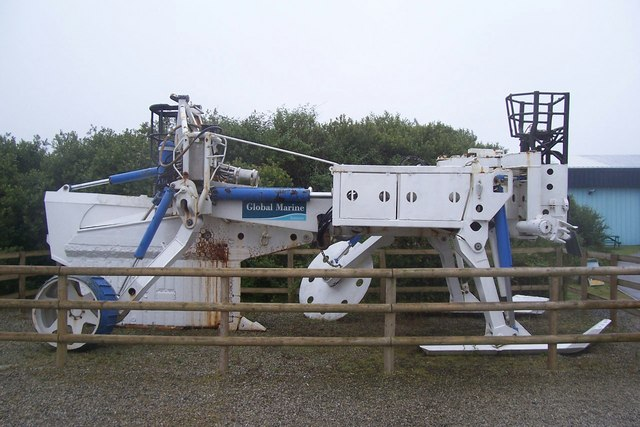
A sea plough is a cable-laying plough for submarine operation.

A pipe-and-cable-laying plough or pipe-laying mole plough is a piece of construction equipment to bury cables or pipes. The machinery is a form of a subsoiler with a single blade. It is used to lay buried services of virtually any description like drainage, water, electricity, telecommunications, and gas supply. A coil of the service pipe/cable is mounted on the tractor and is led down a guide behind the blade, and is left buried behind the plough in a single operation, without the need to dig a deep trench and re-fill it.

This process is normally used in areas where there are no hardened surfaces like tarmac. There should also not be any previously buried services like drainage pipes on agricultural land.

There are also specialised laying ploughs for cable laying behind traffic barriers, in stream or lake beds or even for the laying of submarine cables in deep sea, so-called sea ploughs. Sea ploughs are pulled behind cable ships and bury the cable in the sea bed. Burying submarine cables helps protect them from anchors, trawlers and other risks.

An early recorded attempt to use this technique was in 1855 by the British during the Crimean War, however the plough was found to be too light to penetrate the frozen soil.
