= Big Sandy, Montana =

- Town
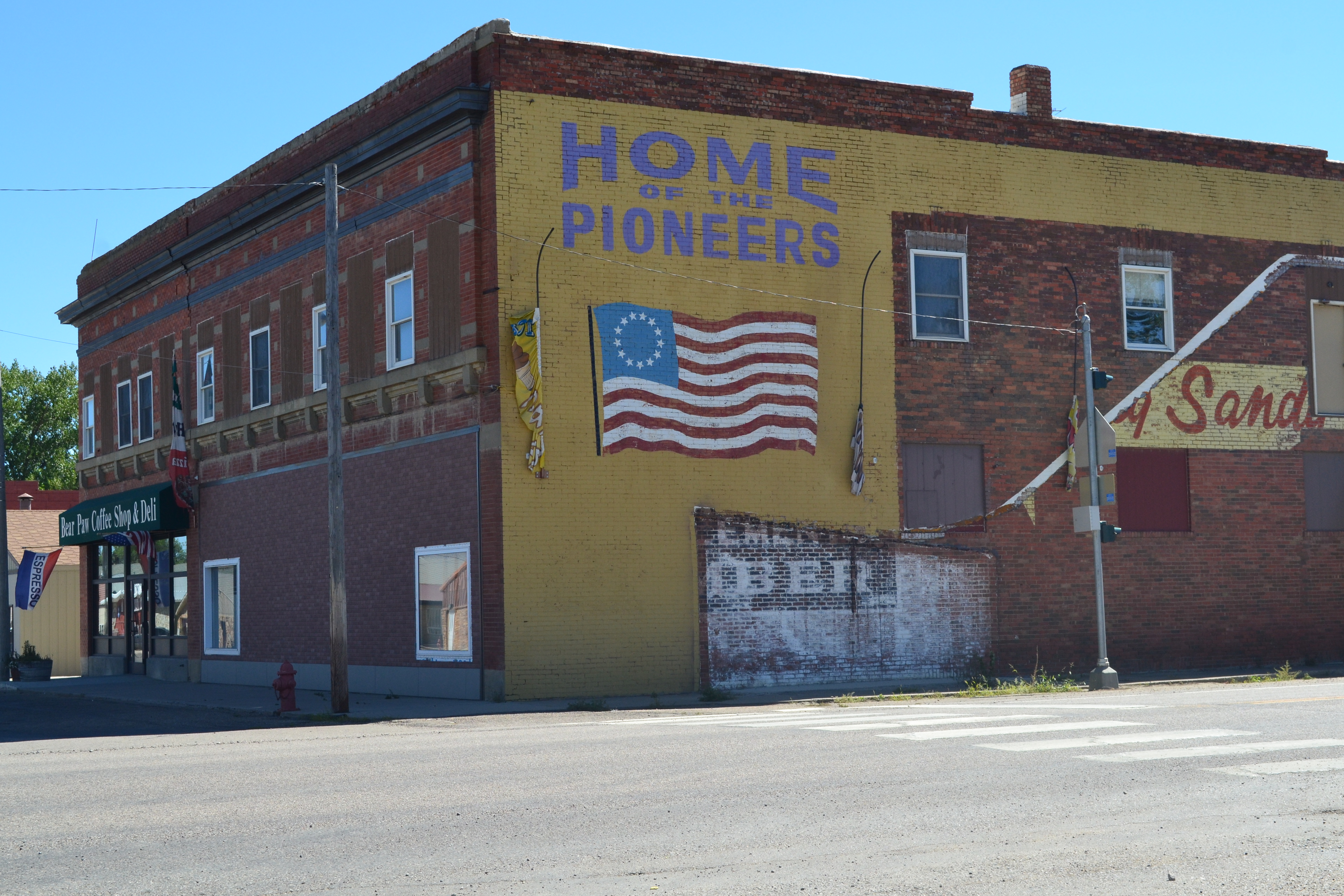

- Seal

- Location of Big Sandy, Montana
- Coordinates: 48°10′43″N 110°06′48″W
- Country: United States
- State: Montana
- County: Chouteau

Area
  - Total: 0.47 sq mi (1.23 km^{2})
  - Land: 0.47 sq mi (1.23 km^{2})
  - Water: 0 sq mi (0.00 km^{2})
- Elevation: 2,704 ft (824 m)

Population (2020)
  - Total: 605
  - Density: 1,269.4/sq mi (490.11/km^{2})
- Time zone: UTC-7 (Mountain (MST))
  - Summer (DST): UTC-6 (MDT)
- ZIP code: 59520
- Area code: 406
- FIPS code: 30-06250
- GNIS feature ID: 2411689
- Website: townofbigsandy.com

Big Sandy is a town in Chouteau County, Montana, United States. The population was 605 at the 2020 census.

The Lewis and Clark Trail, following U.S. Route 87, goes through Big Sandy.

Big Sandy native Jeff Ament, Pearl Jam bassist, built the town a skatepark with his Montana Pool Service non-profit organization in 2010.

Big Bud 747, claimed to be the largest farm tractor in the world, was located here from 1997 until 2009, and returned in 2020.

== History ==
At one time the site of a saloon that served Missouri River freighters, the community of Big Sandy is named for nearby Big Sandy Creek. The town began in 1887 with the arrival of the St. Paul, Minneapolis & Manitoba Railway (later the Great Northern Railway). By early 1900, Cornelius J. McNamara and Thomas A. Marlow, owners of the McNamara Cattle Company, had opened the town's first store. Homesteaders began arriving in Big Sandy in 1909, and an influx continued for a decade.

Several stories explain the creek's name. The most colorful involves a muleskinner, “Big Sandy” Lane, who arrived one day near the present townsite and, to his dismay, discovered the creek at flood stage. He cursed the uncooperative weather, his bad luck, and the flooded creek crossing so fluently that the offending stream dried up immediately and he was able to cross.

For decades Big Sandy's primary landmark was the town water tower, which was visible for many miles. The water tower was dismantled in 1993. As of 2019 some local and former residents have banded together to establish a recurring puddle on Main Street (which has been dubbed, simply, "Puddle") as a new landmark of the municipality. Two of the higher profile natives of Big Sandy, Craig Edwards and Steve Sibra, are among those who actively promote "Puddle" as a body of water of consequence.

== Geography ==
According to the United States Census Bureau, the town has a total area of 0.48 square miles (1.24 km^{2}), all land.

The town is located in what is referred to as the "Golden Triangle", a region renowned for its wheat and barley production.

Nearby Lonesome Lake is a shallow lake providing a prairie wetland complex. It becomes a resting area for migrating waterfowl and shorebirds. In the summer, pronghorn, coyotes, and badger can be found.

=== Climate ===
According to the Köppen Climate Classification system, Big Sandy has a semi-arid climate, abbreviated "BSk" on climate maps.

Climate data for Big Sandy, Montana (1991–2020 normals, extremes 1921–present)
Month	Jan	Feb	Mar	Apr	May	Jun	Jul	Aug	Sep	Oct	Nov	Dec	Year
Record high °F (°C)	65 (18)	76 (24)	81 (27)	94 (34)	100 (38)	106 (41)	109 (43)	111 (44)	104 (40)	92 (33)	78 (26)	72 (22)	111 (44)
Mean maximum °F (°C)	54.1 (12.3)	56.4 (13.6)	68.3 (20.2)	78.8 (26.0)	85.4 (29.7)	92.8 (33.8)	99.1 (37.3)	98.1 (36.7)	93.3 (34.1)	79.5 (26.4)	65.1 (18.4)	56.0 (13.3)	100.8 (38.2)
Mean daily maximum °F (°C)	30.8 (−0.7)	35.2 (1.8)	46.0 (7.8)	58.4 (14.7)	67.9 (19.9)	75.9 (24.4)	85.9 (29.9)	84.8 (29.3)	73.7 (23.2)	58.7 (14.8)	43.6 (6.4)	33.5 (0.8)	57.9 (14.4)
Daily mean °F (°C)	20.3 (−6.5)	24.3 (−4.3)	34.0 (1.1)	45.5 (7.5)	54.6 (12.6)	62.4 (16.9)	70.3 (21.3)	69.1 (20.6)	59.0 (15.0)	45.6 (7.6)	32.6 (0.3)	23.3 (−4.8)	45.1 (7.3)
Mean daily minimum °F (°C)	9.8 (−12.3)	13.4 (−10.3)	22.0 (−5.6)	32.6 (0.3)	41.2 (5.1)	48.9 (9.4)	54.6 (12.6)	53.4 (11.9)	44.2 (6.8)	32.5 (0.3)	21.5 (−5.8)	13.0 (−10.6)	32.3 (0.2)
Mean minimum °F (°C)	−20.3 (−29.1)	−15.8 (−26.6)	−2.6 (−19.2)	15.2 (−9.3)	24.7 (−4.1)	35.5 (1.9)	42.5 (5.8)	39.7 (4.3)	29.7 (−1.3)	11.3 (−11.5)	−3.8 (−19.9)	−17.3 (−27.4)	−29.1 (−33.9)
Record low °F (°C)	−51 (−46)	−52 (−47)	−44 (−42)	−15 (−26)	9 (−13)	22 (−6)	35 (2)	27 (−3)	12 (−11)	−19 (−28)	−33 (−36)	−50 (−46)	−52 (−47)
Average precipitation inches (mm)	0.45 (11)	0.39 (9.9)	0.47 (12)	1.27 (32)	2.07 (53)	3.12 (79)	1.40 (36)	0.99 (25)	1.16 (29)	0.93 (24)	0.60 (15)	0.43 (11)	13.28 (337)
Average precipitation days (≥ 0.01 in)	2.8	2.4	2.7	4.6	7.0	8.6	5.4	3.9	4.1	4.0	2.7	2.0	50.2
Source: NOAA

== Demographics ==
Historical population
Census	Pop.	Note	%±
1920	589		—
1930	633		7.5%
1940	596		−5.8%
1950	743		24.7%
1960	954		28.4%
1970	827		−13.3%
1980	835		1.0%
1990	740		−11.4%
2000	703		−5.0%
2010	598		−14.9%
2020	605		1.2%
U.S. Decennial Census

=== 2010 census ===
As of the census of 2010, there were 598 people, 276 households, and 161 families residing in the town. The population density was 1,359.1 inhabitants per square mile (524.8/km^{2}). There were 337 housing units at an average density of 765.9 per square mile (295.7/km^{2}). The racial makeup of the town was 93.1% White, 0.2% African American, 2.8% Native American, 0.8% Asian, 0.7% Pacific Islander, 0.3% from other races, and 2.0% from two or more races. Hispanic or Latino of any race were 1.3% of the population.

There were 276 households, of which 25.0% had children under the age of 18 living with them, 43.1% were married couples living together, 10.9% had a female householder with no husband present, 4.3% had a male householder with no wife present, and 41.7% were non-families. 39.5% of all households were made up of individuals, and 15.6% had someone living alone who was 65 years of age or older. The average household size was 2.12 and the average family size was 2.83.

The median age in the town was 47.5 years. 21.9% of residents were under the age of 18; 6.2% were between the ages of 18 and 24; 19.7% were from 25 to 44; 31.6% were from 45 to 64; and 20.6% were 65 years of age or older. The gender makeup of the town was 47.0% male and 53.0% female.

=== 2000 census ===
As of the census of 2000, there were 703 people, 296 households, and 179 families residing in the town. The population density was 1,588.1 inhabitants per square mile (613.2/km^{2}). There were 371 housing units at an average density of 838.1 per square mile (323.6/km^{2}). The racial makeup of the town was 95.31% White, 2.84% Native American, 0.14% Pacific Islander, 0.57% from other races, and 1.14% from two or more races. Hispanic or Latino of any race were 0.71% of the population.

There were 296 households, out of which 24.3% had children under the age of 18 living with them, 49.7% were married couples living together, 8.1% had a female householder with no husband present, and 39.2% were non-families. 36.8% of all households were made up of individuals, and 19.6% had someone living alone who was 65 years of age or older. The average household size was 2.18 and the average family size was 2.83.

In the town, the population was spread out, with 21.6% under the age of 18, 5.8% from 18 to 24, 16.8% from 25 to 44, 28.7% from 45 to 64, and 27.0% who were 65 years of age or older. The median age was 48 years. For every 100 females there were 90.0 males. For every 100 females age 18 and over, there were 88.1 males.

The median income for a household in the town was $28,523, and the median income for a family was $35,417. Males had a median income of $23,000 versus $17,917 for females. The per capita income for the town was $14,801. About 10.2% of families and 14.1% of the population were below the poverty line, including 19.7% of those under age 18 and 11.0% of those age 65 or over.

== Arts and culture ==
The Big Sandy Montana Historical Society has a museum in town. They have several exhibits focusing on the early days of the town.

Chouteau County Library, headquartered in Fort Benton, has a branch in Big Sandy.

== Education ==
Big Sandy Public Schools educates students from kindergarten through 12th grade. Big Sandy High School serves the area. They are known as the Pioneers.

== Media ==
The local newspaper is The Big Sandy Mountaineer. It is published weekly.

== Infrastructure ==
U.S. Route 87 travels through town. It is intersected by Montana Highway 432.

Big Sandy Airport is a public use airport one mile south of Big Sandy.

== Notable people ==
- Jeff Ament, bassist of Pearl Jam, was born in nearby Havre and grew up in Big Sandy.
- Jon Tester, Democratic U.S. Senator from 2007 to 2025, and organic farmer

== Gallery ==
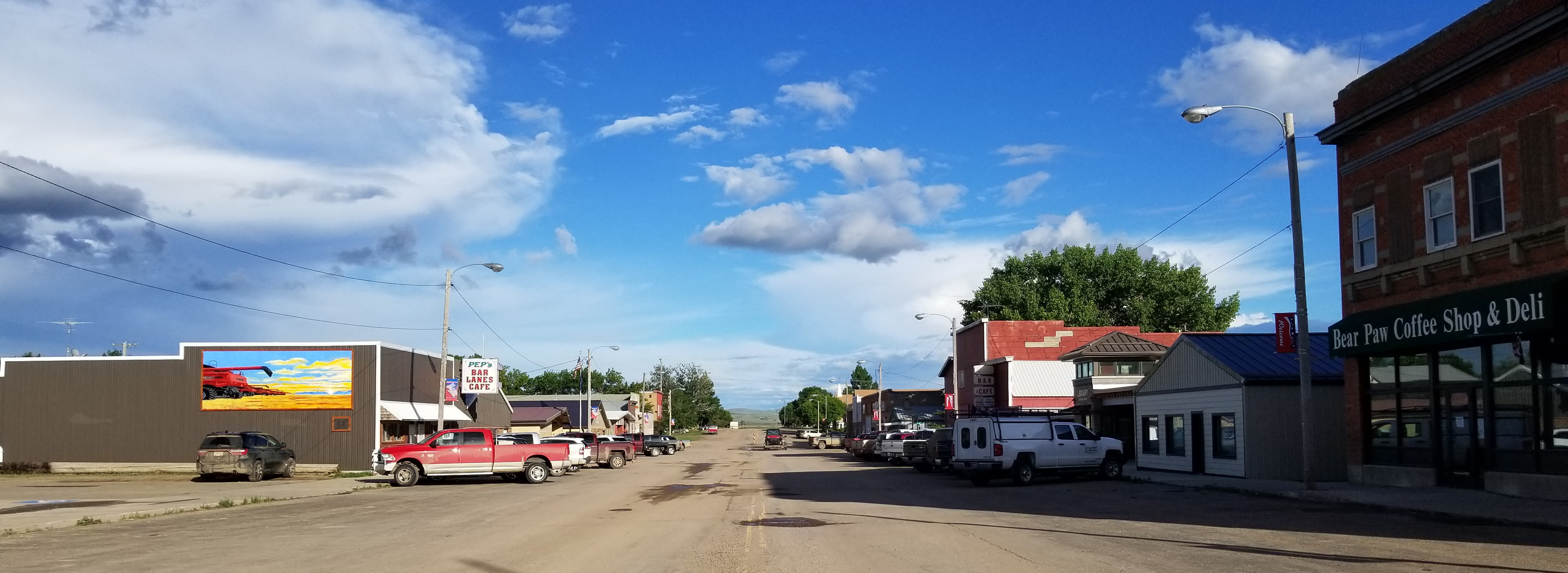
Johannes Avenue

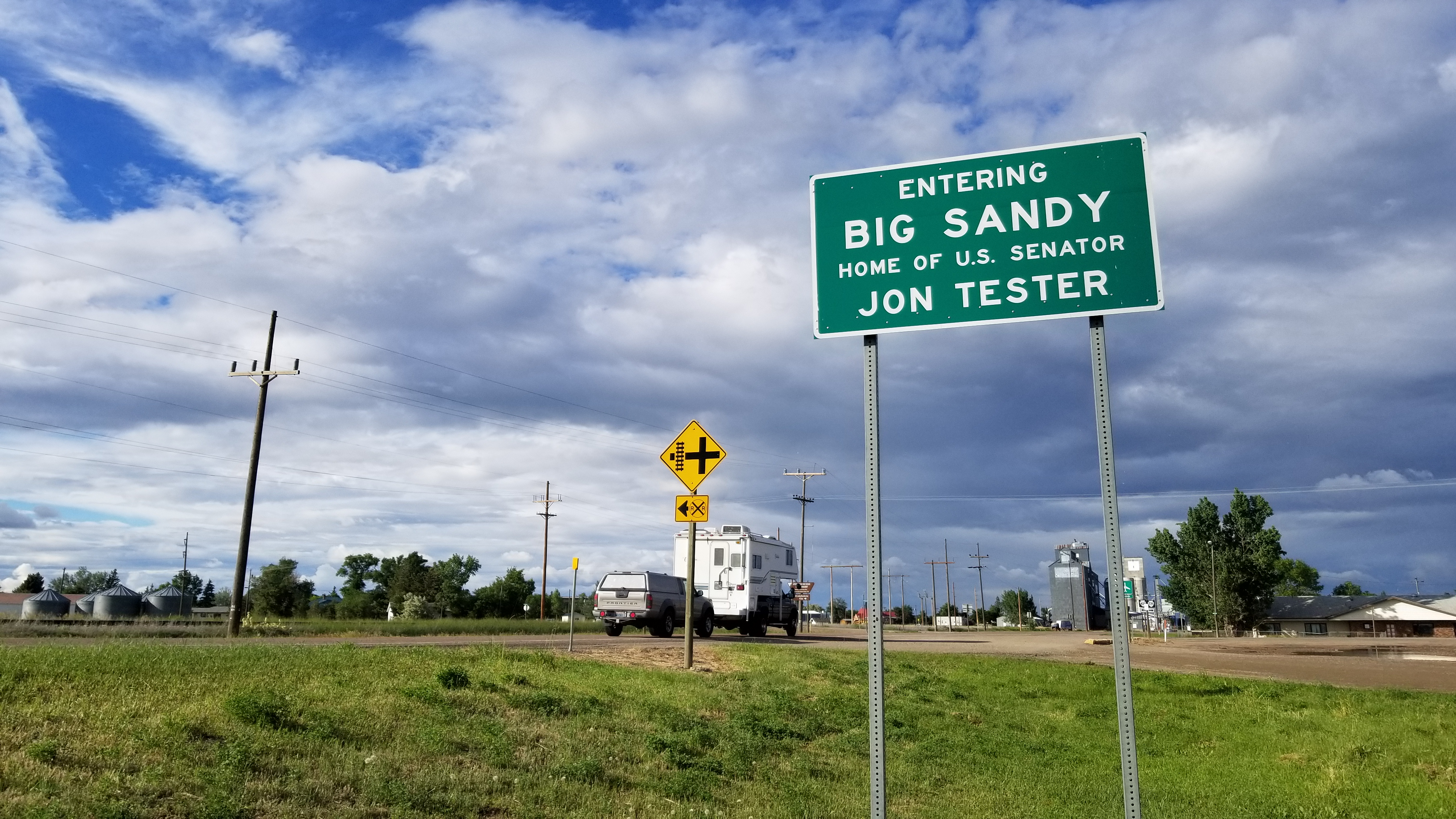
Entering Big Sandy

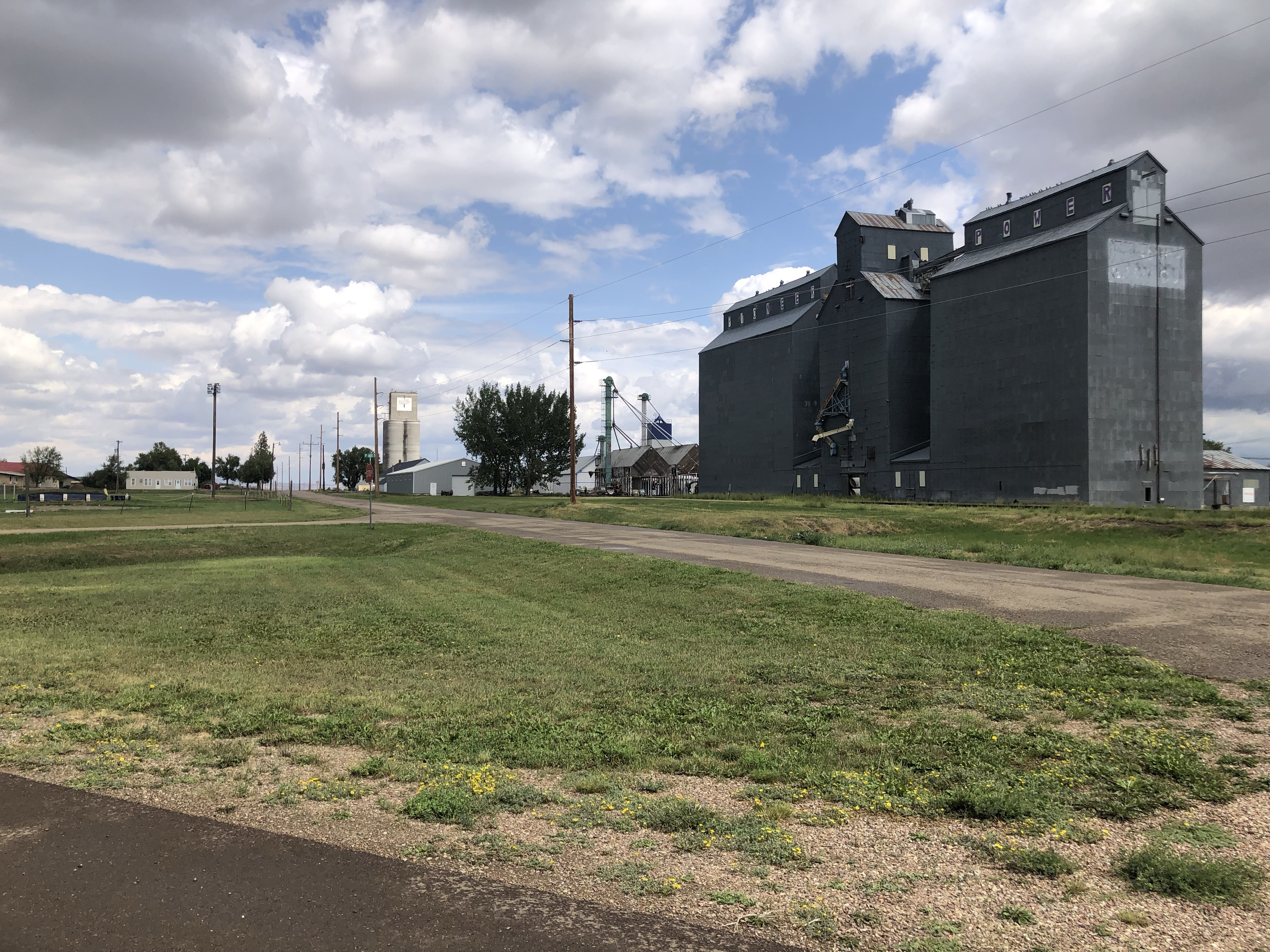
Big Sandy Elevators from Centennial Ave

== See also ==
- Cornfield Bomber, an F-106 that landed in a field near Big Sandy.
