= Battle of Palmdale =

1956 attempted shoot-down of a runaway drone

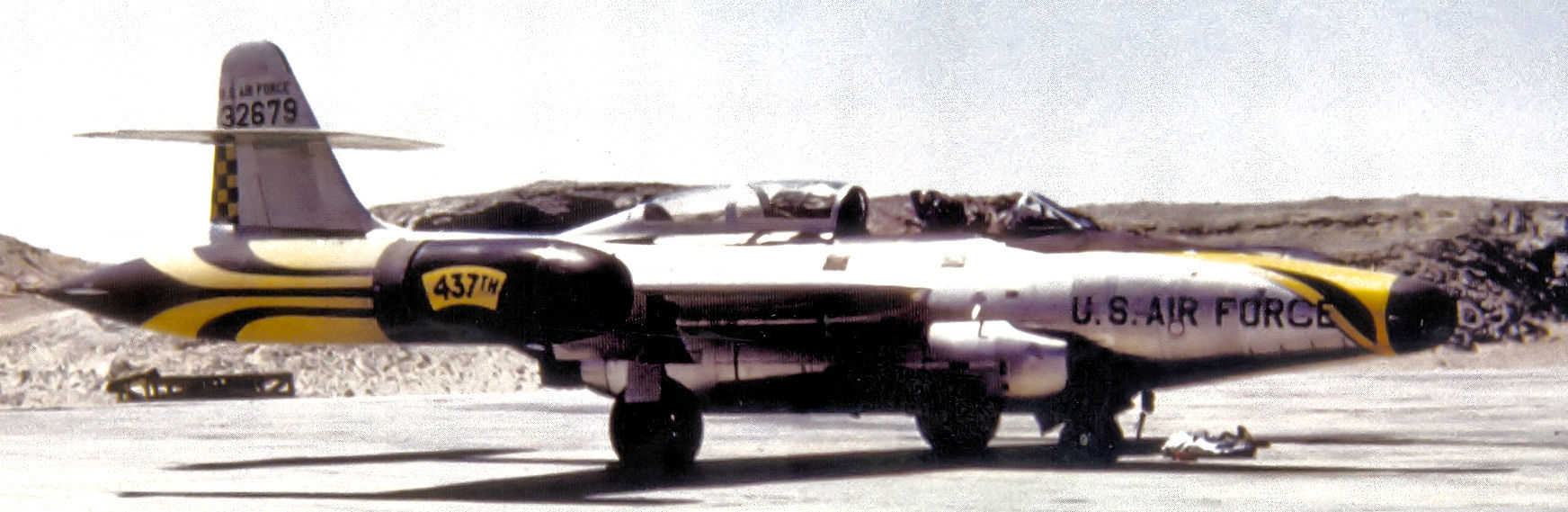
- Northrop F-89D Scorpion of the 437th Fighter Intercept Squadron stationed at Oxnard AFB California 1956.

Incident
- Date: August 16, 1956
- Summary: Attempted shootdown
- Site: Southern California

Aircraft
- Aircraft type: F6F-5K drone and F-89D Scorpion

The Battle of Palmdale was the attempted shoot-down of a runaway drone by United States Air Force interceptors in the skies over Southern California in mid-August 1956. The drone was launched from Naval Air Station Point Mugu and soon went out of control. Interceptor aircraft took off from Oxnard Air Force Base and caught up with the drone, but were ultimately unable to bring it down, despite using all of their rockets. After it ran out of fuel, the unmanned aircraft crashed in a sparsely populated tract of desert.

During the incident, over 1,000 acres (400 ha) were scorched, and a substantial amount of property was damaged or destroyed.

== Background ==
In the mid-1950s, the United States Navy was involved in research and development on surface-to-air and air-to-air missiles for the protection of its ships and other assets. The missiles being tested at this time included the AIM-7 Sparrow and the Bendix AAM-N-10 Eagle. Unmanned drones were used to test the missiles' effectiveness. One type of drone was the Grumman F6F-5K Hellcat.

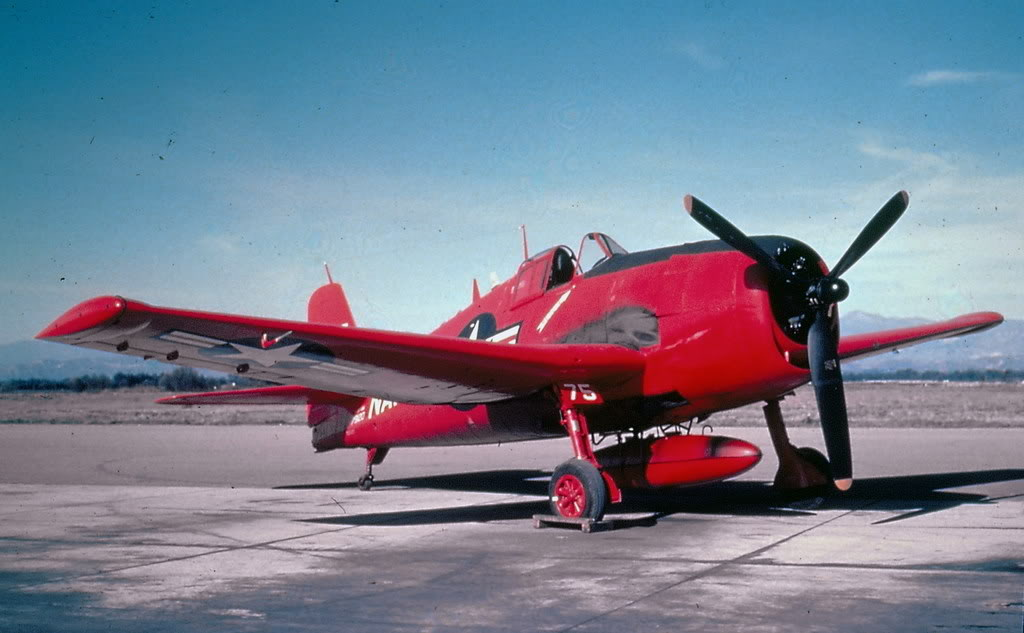
Grumman F6F-5K drone

At the same time, one of the Air Force's major concerns was how to protect the country from Soviet strategic bombers, such as the Tupolev Tu-16 and the new Myasishchev M-4. In 1956, the Air Force's frontline cutting-edge technology interceptor was the heavily-armed Northrop F-89D Scorpion. Thirty active duty United States Air Force and seven Air National Guard interceptor squadrons using the Scorpion existed in states from Alaska to New York.

== Incident ==
On the morning of 16 August 1956, at NAS Point Mugu, an F6F-5K, painted high-visibility red, was prepared for its final mission by Navy personnel. At 11:34 a.m. the drone lifted off the runway and was flown by controllers on a heading to the missile test area above the Pacific Ocean. After a short time, the drone stopped responding to commands, and it became clear that the drone had become a runaway.

Controllers watched their target as it started a gentle left-hand climbing turn to the southeast, toward the city of Los Angeles. The Navy had no aircraft available capable of dispatching the drone, so they called Oxnard Air Force Base 5 miles (8.0 km) to the north. The 437th Fighter-Interceptor Squadron immediately scrambled two F-89D Scorpions. The twin jet-interceptor crews were First Lt. Hans Einstein and his radar observer, First Lt. C. D. Murray, followed by First Lt. Richard Hurliman and First Lt. Walter Hale. They headed south in full afterburner and caught up with the drone at 30,000 feet (9,100 m), northeast of Los Angeles. The drone turned southwest, crossing over Los Angeles, then headed northwest. As the drone circled slowly over Santa Paula, the Scorpion pilots waited for it to fly over an unpopulated area so they could attack with their "Mighty Mouse" 2.75-inch folding-fin rockets.

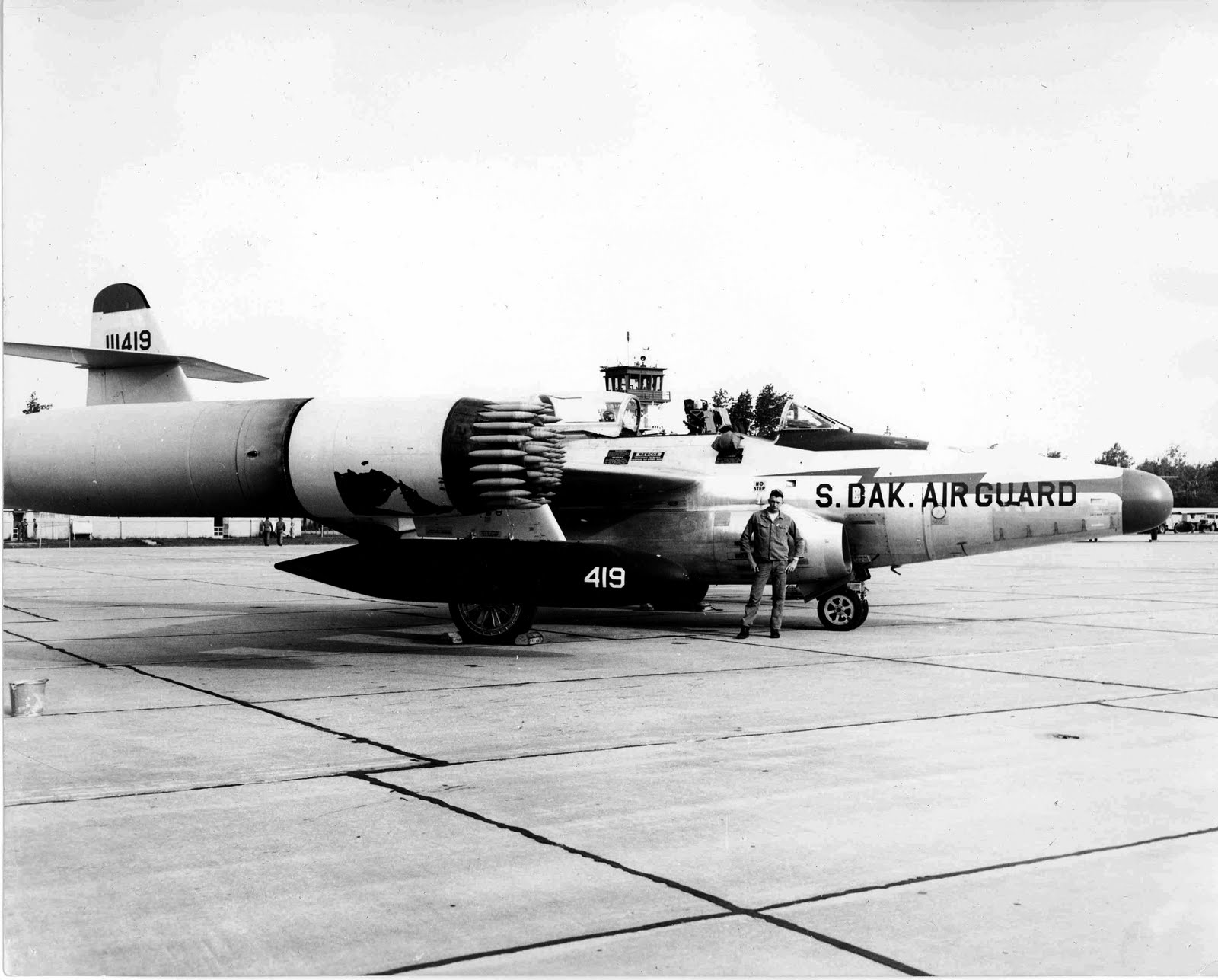
F-89D loaded with rockets. 114th Fighter Interceptor Group, headquartered at Sioux Falls, in 1958.

The two crews discussed attack options. Their D-model Scorpions were equipped with the new Hughes E-6 fire-control system with AN/APG-40 radar and an attack-plotting computer, which gave them a choice of two attack options to fire the unguided rockets while in automatic mode: from behind in a "tail chase" situation or a firing pass from a 90° "beam" position. Since the drone was almost continuously turning, they chose the second mode of attack. Soon the drone turned northeast, passing over Fillmore, then Frazier Park, heading for the western section of the mostly uninhabited Antelope Valley. The attackers attempted to fire in automatic mode several times, but due to a design flaw in the fire-control system, the rockets failed to launch.

Suddenly, the drone turned back towards Los Angeles. Einstein and Hurliman switched from the faulty automatic mode to manual fire. The D-model Scorpions had been delivered with gun sights, but when the E-6 fire-control system was later added, the sights were removed. Now, with the radar-guided system inoperative and no gun sight, the attackers were forced to manually aim the unguided rockets. The F-89D was capable of firing all 104 of its rockets at once, all leaving their tubes in only 0.4 s. The rockets could also be set to "ripple fire" in two different patterns: two ripples (64 and 42 rockets) or three ripples (42, 32, and 30 rockets). A single hit was sufficient to bring down an aircraft. Murray and Hale set their intervalometers to "ripple fire" in three salvos.

While the drone flew over Castaic, the first crew lined up and fired 42 rockets, completely missing their target. The second interceptor moved into position and unleashed another salvo of 42 rockets, passing just beneath the bright red drone, a few glancing off the fuselage underside, but none detonating. Close to the town of Newhall the pair of jets made a second pass, launching a total of 64 rockets; again, none found the mark. The two Scorpion crews adjusted their intervalometer settings and, as the wayward drone headed northeast toward Palmdale, each fired a last salvo of 30 at the target with no hits, dispensing their last rockets. In all, the Air Force element fired 208 rockets and was unable to shoot the Hellcat down.

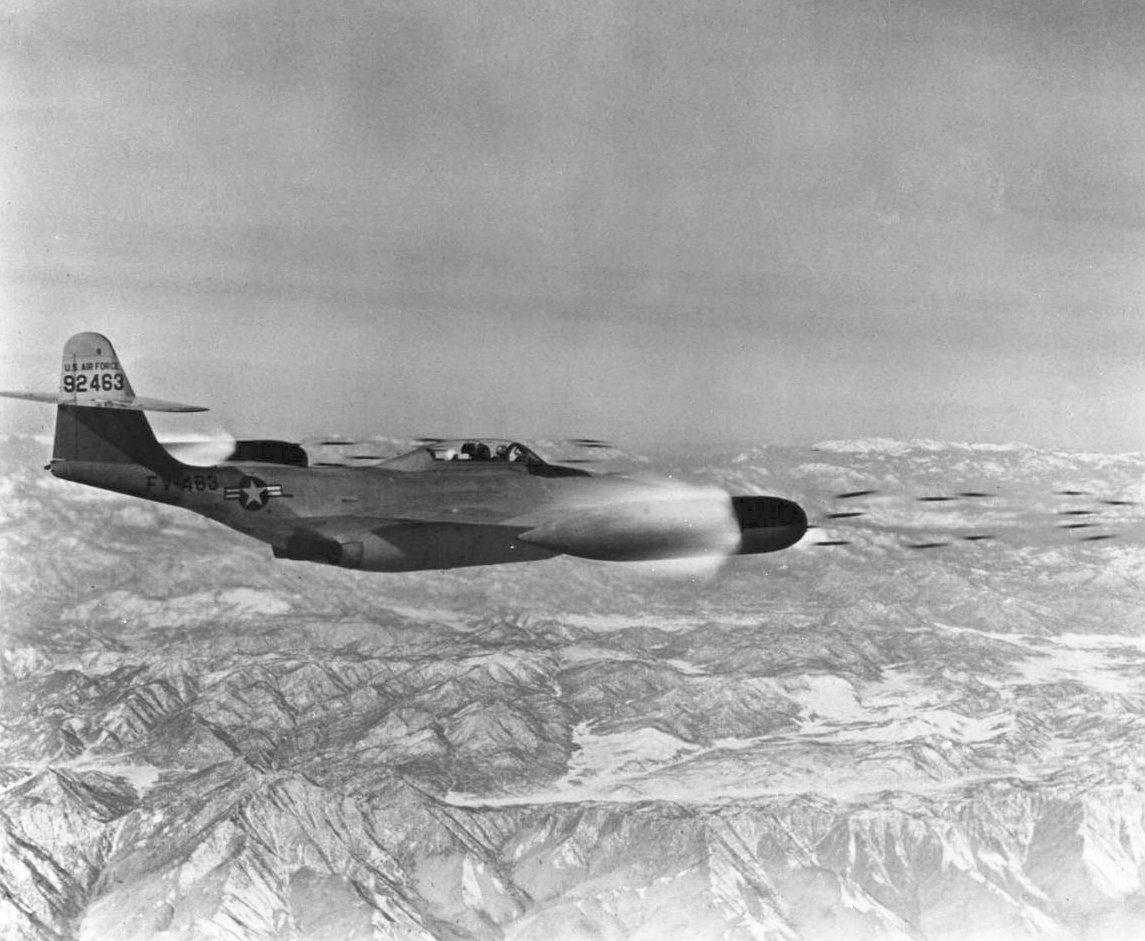
F-89D firing Mighty Mouse Rockets

As the Scorpion pilots headed home low on fuel, the drone advanced toward Palmdale, its engine sputtering from fuel starvation. The drone slowly descended in an easy spiral, approaching a desolate section of desert 8 miles (13 km) east from Palmdale Regional Airport. Just before crashing, the drone severed three Southern California Edison electric cables along an unpaved section of Avenue P. The drone's right wing dug into the sand, it then cartwheeled and disintegrated. In July 1997, archaeologists found some pieces of the drone "identifiable by part numbers and inspection stamps".

Ground transmitter failure and aircraft receiver malfunction are two possible explanations for the drone going rogue.

== Aftermath ==
The incident resulted in damage on the ground. The Mk. 4 rockets were fitted with point-detonating warheads that armed on firing. Of the 208 rockets, only 15 were discovered undetonated.

The first set of rockets started brush fires 7 miles (11 km) northeast from Castaic, which burned 150 acres (61 ha) above the old Ridge Route near Bouquet Canyon.

Some of the second set of rockets reached the ground near the city of Newhall. In Placerita Canyon, one rocket was seen bouncing along the ground and starting a series of fires near a park, while others set fire to oil sumps owned by the Indian Oil Co. The fires reached within 300 feet (91 m) of the Bermite Powder explosives plant. Other rockets started fires in the proximity of Soledad Canyon, near Mount Gleason, burning more than 350 acres (140 ha) of rough brush.

Scorpion in Fresno California July 1957, with front of rocket pods exposed

The final set of rockets was fired while the Scorpions faced Palmdale; many struck within the town. "As the drone passed over Palmdale's downtown, Mighty Mouse rockets fell like hail." "Edna Carlson, who lived in the home on Third Street East, said that a chunk of shrapnel from one Air Force rocket burst through the front window of her home, ricocheted off the ceiling, went through a wall and came to rest in a kitchen cupboard." More rocket fragments completely penetrated a home and garage on 4th Street East. One rocket struck right in front of a vehicle being driven west on California State Route 138 near Tenth Street West, of which one tire was shredded and many holes were punched through the car's body. Two men in Placerita Canyon had been eating in their utility truck; right after they left it to sit under the shade of a tree, a rocket struck the truck, destroying it. Many fires were started near Santa Clarita, with three large ones and many smaller ones in and around Palmdale.

It took 500 firefighters two days to bring the brushfires under control. In all, 1,000 acres (400 ha) were burned. There were no fatalities.

== See also ==
- Cornfield Bomber
