= LOCAT =

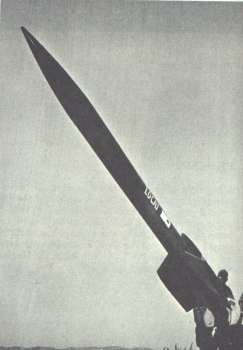
- Type: Target drone
- Place of origin: United States

Service history
- In service: 1969
- Used by: United States Army

Production history
- Manufacturer: Philco-Ford

Specifications
- Mass: 155 pounds (70 kg)
- Length: 15 feet (4.6 m)
- Diameter: 9.6 inches (240 mm)
- Engine: 3x Mk 40 Mod 0 solid fuel rockets
- Operational range: 2 miles (3.2 km)
- Maximum speed: 520 miles per hour (840 km/h)
- Guidance system: None
- Launch platform: Douglas AD Skyraider; McDonnell F2H Banshee

The Low-Cost Aerial Target, or LOCAT, was designed as an inexpensive target rocket for use by the United States Army during the late 1960s. The missile was tested by the U.S. Army, but failed to win a production contract.

== Design and development ==
Developed by Philco-Ford in the late 1960s, the LOCAT rocket was intended to be a high-speed, low-cost expendable target rocket for use in the air defense training role, being used in training exercises for anti-aircraft gunners and missile operators by the U.S. Army.

Intended to be extremely simple and inexpensive in its construction, the fuselage tube of LOCAT was constructed from rolled paper tubing, while the rocket's stabilising fins were made of molded plastic. An aluminum coating was applied as a surfacing to enhance the rocket's radar signature, and three solid-fuel rockets of the type used by Folding-Fin Aerial Rockets were used for propulsion.

== Operational history ==
Forty examples of the LOCAT rocket were ordered by the United States Army during 1969, for operational evaluation to determine if they were suitable in the target-drone role. The contract included an option for ordering production quantities if the rocket was considered acceptable for service. Although LOCAT proved to be reasonably satisfactory in the Army's testing, and it was estimated that, even when compared to reusable drones, LOCAT offered a 50% savings in cost over other methods of target training, no production contract was placed, the MTR-15 BATS being judged superior for the Army's purposes.
