= Naval Air Station Point Mugu =

US Navy airfield near Oxnard, California, U.S.

- Near Oxnard, California in United States
- An Aerial View Of Point Mugu Naval Air Station, Taken From Onboard A United Airlines Boeing 757-324 Flying Overhead On October 5th, 2026.

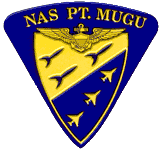

Site information
- Type: Naval Air Station
- Owner: Department of Defense
- Operator: US Navy

Location
- Location in the United States

Site history
- Built: 1941
- In use: 1941 – 2000
- Fate: Merged in 2000 to become an element of Naval Base Ventura County

Airfield information
- Identifiers: IATA: NTD, ICAO: KNTD, FAA LID: NTD, WMO: 723910
- Elevation: 3.9 metres (13 ft) AMSL
Runways
Direction	Length and surface
03/21	3,383.8 metres (11,102 ft) asphalt
09/27	1,677 metres (5,502 ft) asphalt

Naval Air Station Point Mugu was a United States naval air station near Oxnard, California, which operated as an independent base from 1941 to 2000, when it merged with nearby Naval Construction Battalion Center Port Hueneme to form Naval Base Ventura County.

== History ==
The facility in Point Mugu, California, started as a United States Navy anti-aircraft training center during World War II and was developed in the late 1940s as the Navy's major missile development and test facility. This was where most of the Navy's missiles were developed and tested during the 1950s–1960s era, including the AIM-7 Sparrow family and the AIM-54 Phoenix air-to-air, Bullpup air-to-surface, and Regulus surface-to-surface missiles.

Pt. Mugu has dominated the area since the 1940s, and is one of the few places in the area that is not agricultural. The base has been home to many ordnance testing programs, and the test range extends offshore to the Navy-owned San Nicolas Island in the Channel Islands.

In 1963 the United States Navy Marine Mammal Program was established on a sand spit between Mugu Lagoon and the ocean. The facility was relocated in 1967 to Point Loma in San Diego, California.

Point Mugu was the airfield used by former President Ronald Reagan during his presidency on visits to his Santa Barbara ranch. The airfield was used during the state funeral in 2004, as the place where the former President's body was flown to Washington, D.C. to lie in state in the United States Capitol rotunda. The body was flown to Point Mugu aboard presidential aircraft SAM 28000 two days later. Until the late 1990s, the base hosted Antarctic Development Squadron SIX (VXE-6), the squadron of Lockheed LC-130s equipped to land on ice in Antarctica, to supply the science stations there. Now, the New York Air National Guard's 109th Airlift Wing has assumed that responsibility. VXE-6 also flew the Bell UH-1N Twin Huey helicopter during most of its time at Point Mugu.

In December 1988, the 146th Airlift Wing began moving from its home in Van Nuys to a new facility built on 204 acres (83 ha) of state-owned land adjacent to the Point Mugu facility. Known as Channel Islands Air National Guard Station, the annex was constructed at a cost of more than $70 million and was fully activated in April 1990.

The annual Point Mugu airshow began in 1960 and is presently Ventura County's largest public event.

== Accidents and incidents ==
- On 16 August 1956, a F6F-5K drone was launched from NAS Point Mugu and quickly went out of control, heading toward Los Angeles. United States Air Force interceptors failed to shoot it down, leading to the Battle of Palmdale incident.
- On 21 June 1971, F-4 Phantom from VX-4 crashed in a bean field adjacent to NAS Pt. Mugu. No survivors.
- On 4 August 1972, Douglas DC-3 N31538 of Mercer Airlines suffered an in-flight engine fire shortly after take-off on a cargo flight to Hollywood Burbank Airport. The aircraft departed the runway in the emergency landing and was destroyed by the subsequent fire. All three people on board survived.

== Popular culture ==
NAS Point Mugu was the setting for the 1950 film, The Flying Missile. It tells the story of the first firing of a guided missile from the deck of a submarine. Another film filmed in the early 60s at Pt. Mugu was North to Alaska with John Wayne. In the 1970s, the film Midway was filmed on the beach. Scenes depicting Midway Island were filmed at Point Mugu, California. "Point Mugu has sand dunes, just like Midway. We built an airstrip, a tower, some barricades, things like that," said Jack Smight. "We did a lot of strafing and bombing there." More recently, scenes for A Few Good Men were filmed at NAS Point Mugu. Point Mugu is often referenced in the television show 24, specifically in season 5.
