= Big Sandy Airport =

Airport in Montana, United States

- IATA: none; ICAO: none; FAA LID: 3U8

Summary
- Airport type: Public
- Owner: Town of Big Sandy
- Serves: Big Sandy, Montana
- Elevation AMSL: 2,701 ft (823 m)
- Coordinates: 48°09′52″N 110°06′36″W

Map
- Location of airport in Montana

Runways
Direction	Length		Surface
Direction	ft	m	Surface
6/24	3,600	1,097	Asphalt
13/31	2,975	907	Turf
18/36	1,430	436	Turf

Statistics (2011)
- Aircraft operations: 5,350
- Based aircraft: 17
- Source: Federal Aviation Administration

Big Sandy Airport (FAA LID: 3U8) is a public use airport in Chouteau County, Montana, United States. It is owned by the Town of Big Sandy and located one nautical mile (2 km) south of its central business district. This airport is included in the National Plan of Integrated Airport Systems for 2011–2015, which categorized it as a general aviation facility.

== Facilities and aircraft ==
Big Sandy Airport covers an area of 154 acres (62 ha) at an elevation of 2,701 feet (823 m) above mean sea level. It has one asphalt paved runways designated 6/24 which measures 3,600 by 60 feet (1,097 x 18 m). It also has two turf runways: 13/31 is 2,975 by 50 feet (907 x 15 m) and 18/36 is 1,430 by 55 feet (436 x 17 m).

For the 12-month period ending July 21, 2011, the airport had 5,350 general aviation aircraft operations, an average of 103 per week: 93% local and 7% transient. At that time there were 17 single-engine aircraft based at this airport.

== See also ==
- List of airports in Montana
