= Cornfield Bomber =

1970 accident involving an F-106 of the US Air Force

Coordinates: 48°10′40″N 110°06′53″W

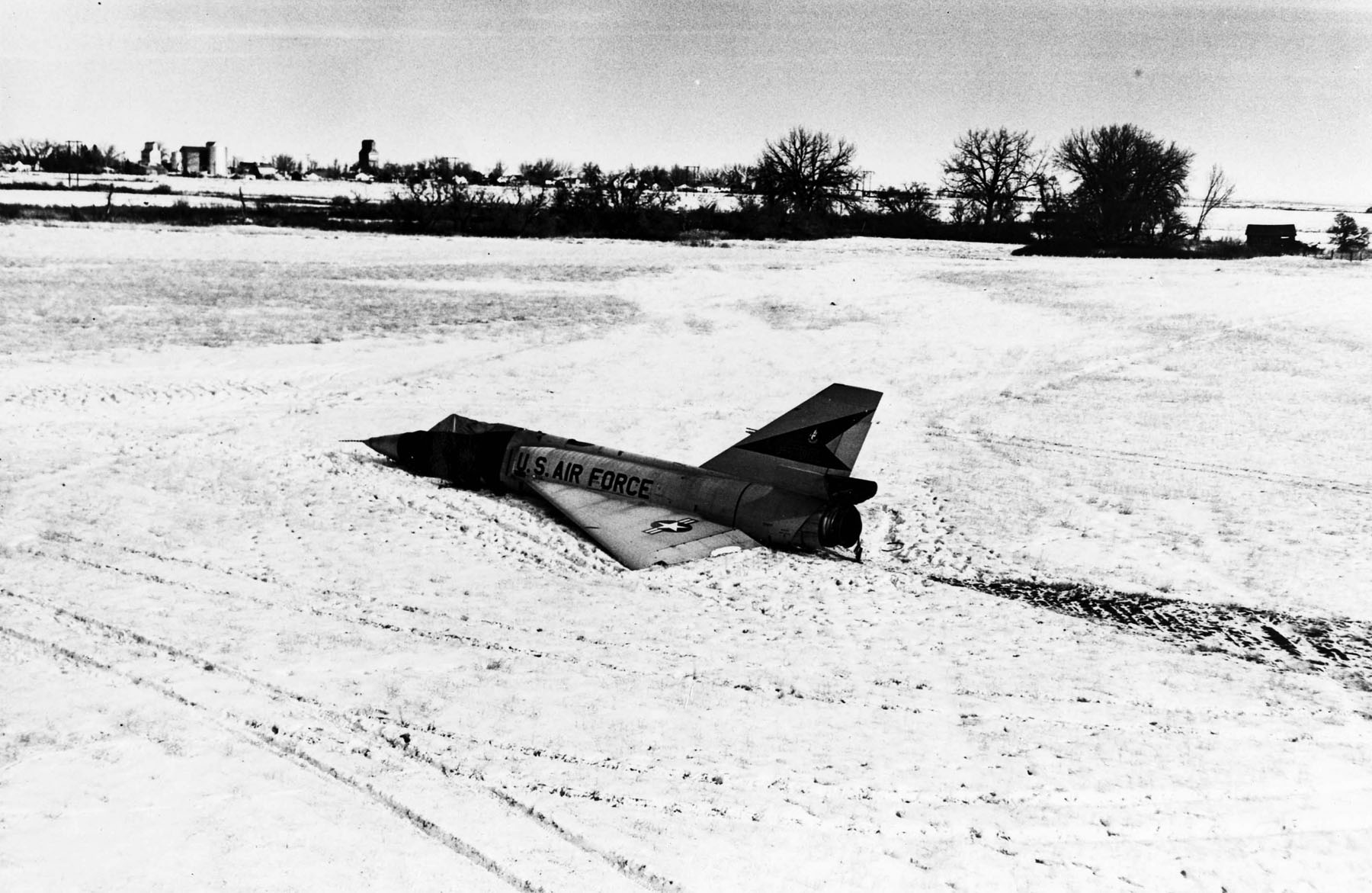
- The "Cornfield Bomber" after landing in a frozen Montana field, February 1970

General information
- Type: F-106A-100-CO Delta Dart
- Manufacturer: Convair
- Status: On display
- Owners: United States Air Force
- Serial: 58-0787

History
- In service: 1958–1988
- Preserved at: National Museum of the United States Air Force in Dayton, Ohio

The "Cornfield Bomber" is the nickname given to a Convair F-106 Delta Dart of the United States Air Force's 71st Fighter-Interceptor Squadron which made an unpiloted landing in a farmer's field in Montana in 1970. Suffering only minor damage after the pilot had ejected from the aircraft during a training mission gone awry, the aircraft was recovered, repaired, and returned to service. It is currently on display at the National Museum of the United States Air Force at Wright-Patterson Air Force Base near Dayton, Ohio.

== History ==
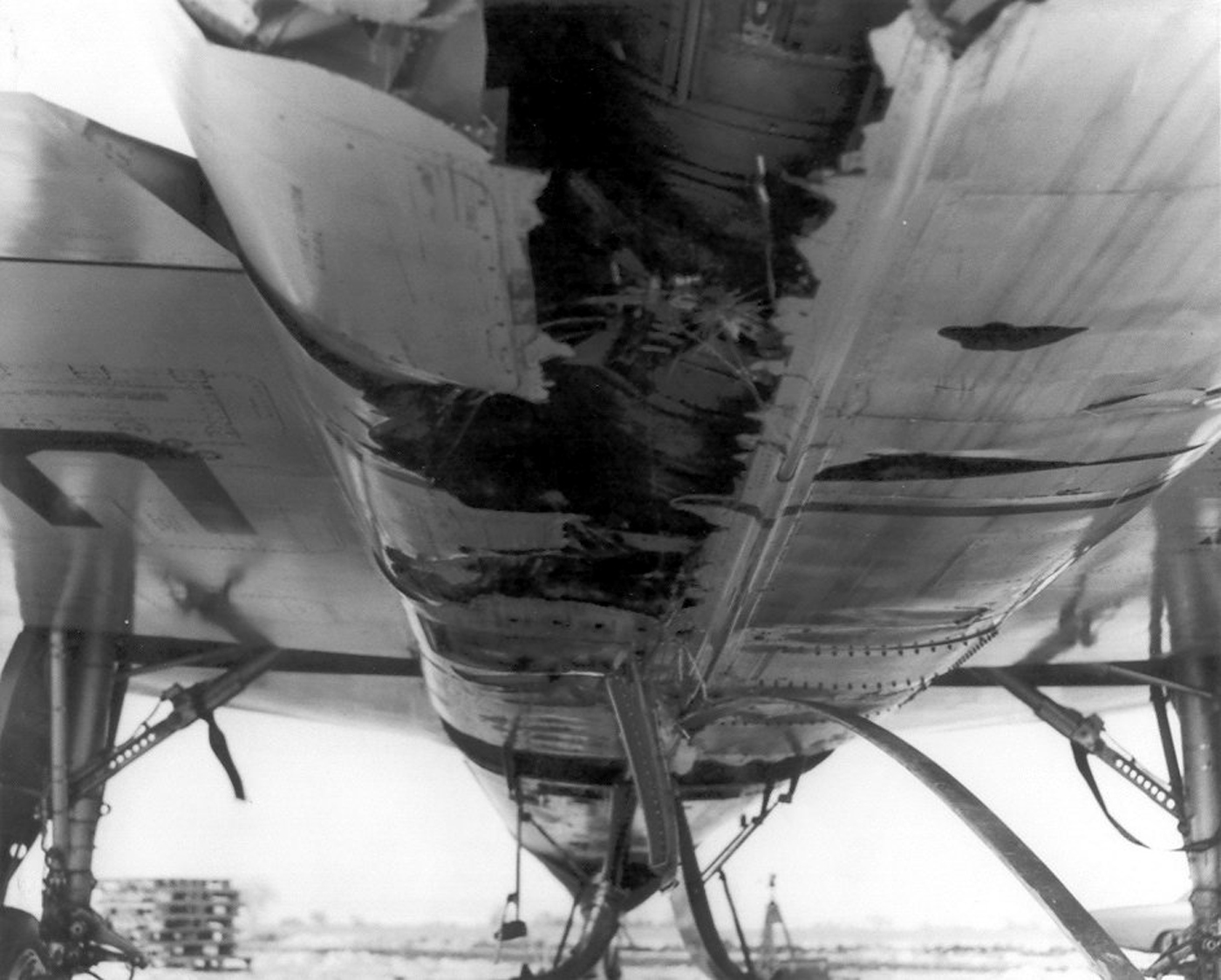
The underside of 58-0787, showing the damage it received during its belly landing

The aircraft was manufactured by Convair in 1958 and given the tail number 58-0787. It served with the 71st Fighter-Interceptor Squadron based at Malmstrom Air Force Base adjacent to Great Falls, Montana. During a routine training flight conducting aerial combat maneuvers on February 2, 1970, the aircraft entered a flat spin. The pilot, First Lieutenant Gary Foust, deployed the aircraft's drag chute as a last resort while attempting to recover. When it failed, Foust ejected at an altitude of 15,000 feet (4,600 m).

The reduction in weight and change in center of gravity caused by the removal of the pilot, coupled with the blast force of the ejection seat pushing the nose of the aircraft down, which had been trimmed by Foust for takeoff and idle throttle, caused the aircraft to recover from the spin. The previously set trim then helped stabilize the attitude of the plane after the initial nose down. One of the other pilots on the mission was reported to have radioed Foust during his descent by parachute, saying that "you'd better get back in it!" From his parachute, Foust watched incredulously as the now-pilotless aircraft descended and skidded to a halt in a farmer's field near Big Sandy, Montana. Foust drifted into the nearby mountains, and was later rescued by local residents on snowmobiles.

Shortly thereafter, the local sheriff and local residents arrived at the scene of the crash. The thrust from the still-idling jet engine allowed the aircraft to slowly drift on its belly across the field after it landed. The sheriff, having contacted the air base, was informed that he should wait for the jet to run out of fuel, which occurred one hour and 45 minutes later without further incident. A recovery crew from McClellan Air Force Base arrived on the scene and began to dismantle the aircraft, removing its wings for transport aboard a railroad flat car. The damage to the aircraft was minimal; indeed, one officer on the recovery crew is reported to have stated that if there had been any less damage, he could have flown the aircraft out of the field.

== Preservation ==
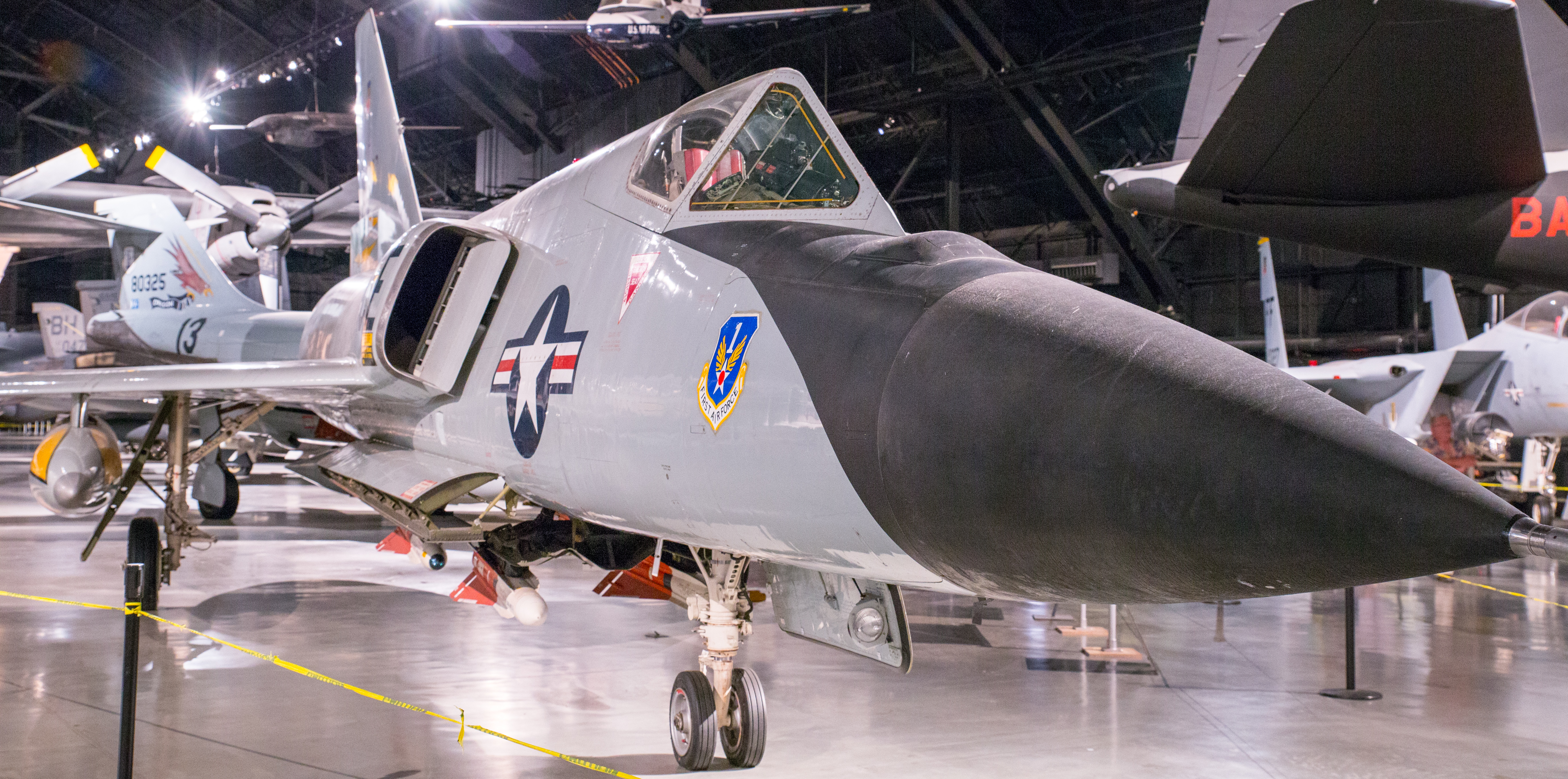
The aircraft at the National Museum of the United States Air Force in 2016

Following its misadventure, the "Cornfield Bomber" was repaired and returned to service, operating with the 49th Fighter-Interceptor Squadron, the final Air Force unit to operate the F-106. Foust flew the aircraft again in 1979 while training at Tyndall Air Force Base. Upon its retirement, it was presented to the National Museum of the United States Air Force in August 1986, where it remains on display.

== See also ==
- 1989 Belgium MiG-23 crash
- Battle of Palmdale
