= Folding-Fin Aerial Rocket =

Folding-Fin Aerial Rocket / Mighty Mouse
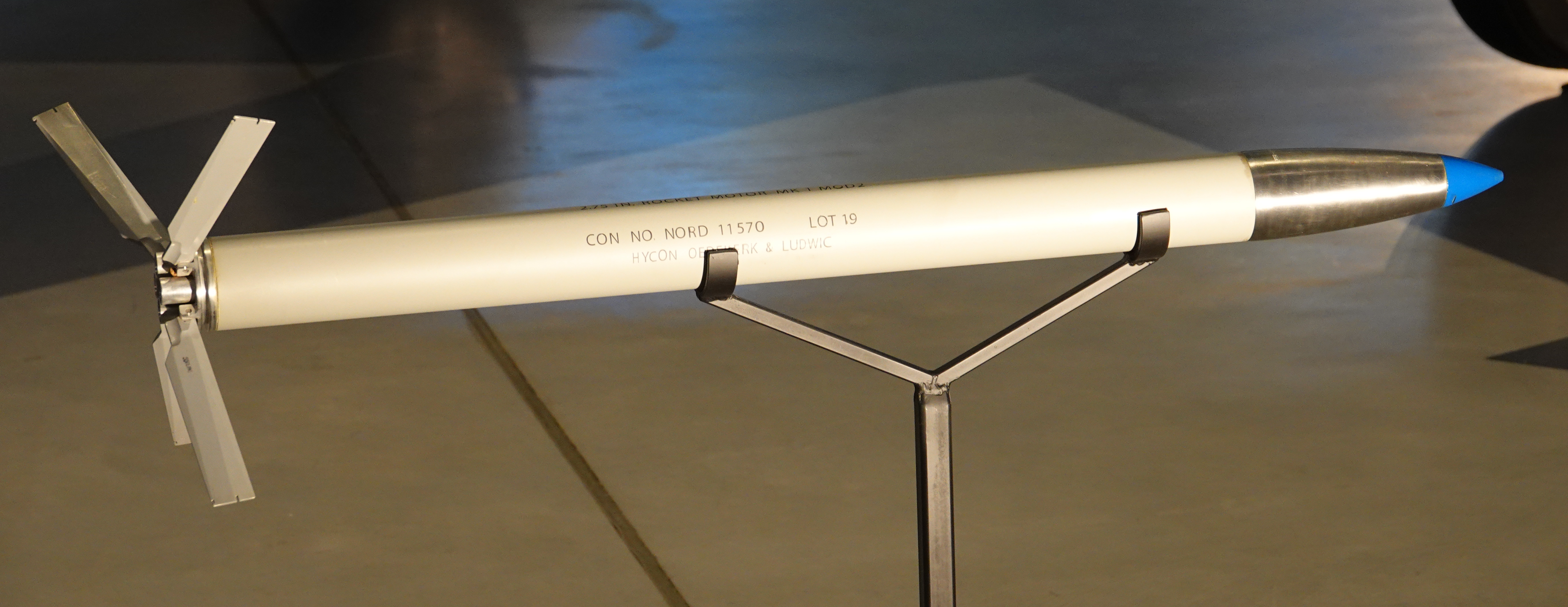
- A Mighty Mouse rocket at Steven F. Udvar-Hazy Center in Virginia
- Type: Air-to-air rocket, air-to-surface rocket
- Place of origin: United States

Service history
- Used by: United States military

Specifications
- Diameter: 2.75 inches (70 mm)
- Warhead: various
- Engine: Solid-fuel rocket
- Guidance system: None

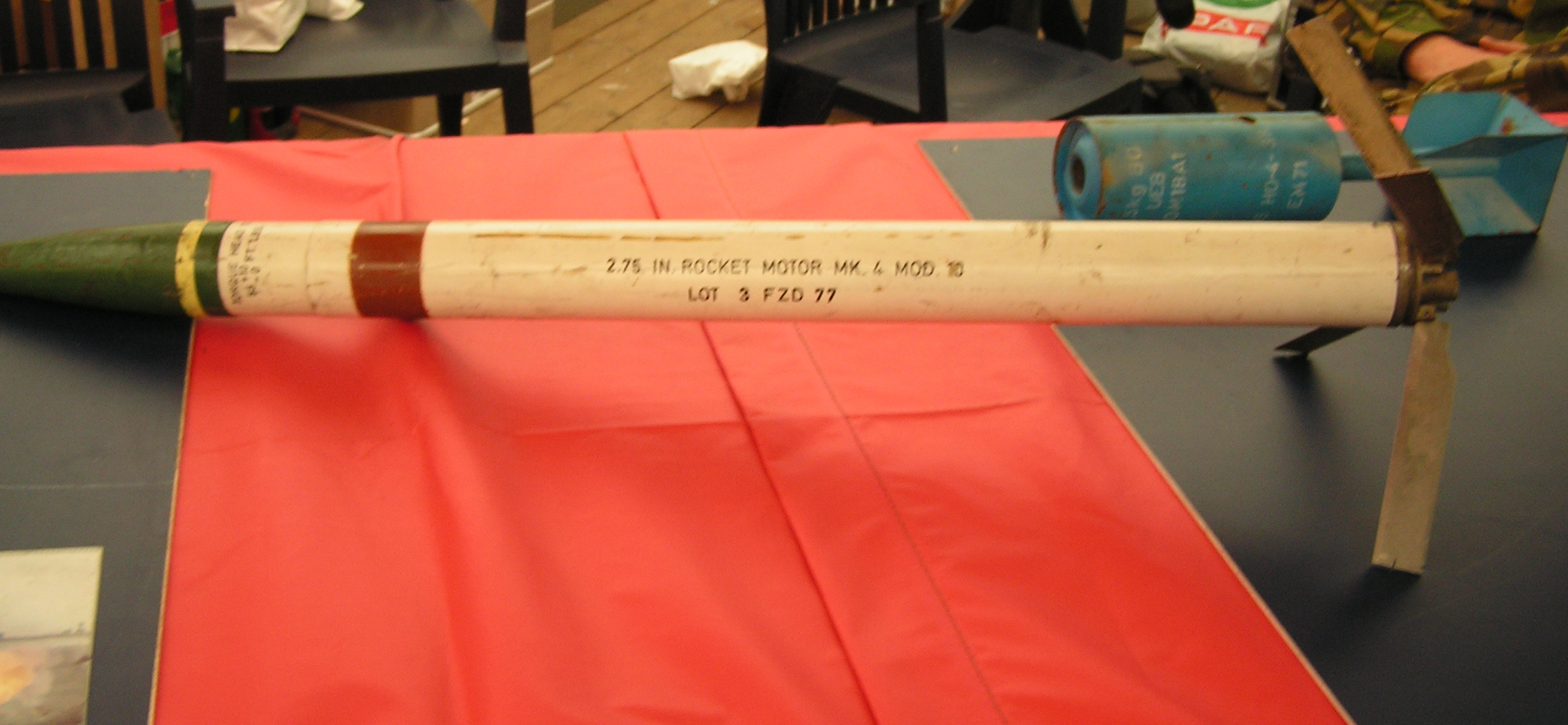
Mk 4 mod 10 rocket on display at Volkel Air Base

The Mk 4 Folding-Fin Aerial Rocket (FFAR), also known as "Mighty Mouse", is an unguided rocket used by United States military aircraft. It was 2.75 inches (70 mm) in diameter. Designed as an air-to-air weapon for interceptor aircraft to shoot down enemy bombers, it primarily saw service as an air-to-surface weapon. The FFAR has been developed into the modern Hydra 70 series, which is still in service.

== History ==
The advent of jet engines for fighters and bombers posed new problems for interceptors. With closing speeds of 1,500 ft/s (457 m/s) or more for head-on interceptions, the time available for a fighter pilot to successfully target an enemy aircraft and inflict sufficient damage to bring it down was increasingly small. Wartime experience had shown that .50 caliber (12.7 mm) machine guns were not powerful enough to reliably down a bomber, certainly not in a single volley, and heavy autocannons did not have the range or rate of fire to ensure a hit. Unguided rockets had been proven effective in ground-attack work during the war, and the Luftwaffe had shown that volleys of their Werfer-Granate 21 rockets, first used by elements of the Luftwaffe's JG 1 and JG 11 fighter wings on July 29, 1943, against USAAF bombers attacking Kiel and Warnemünde, could be a potent air-to-air weapon. The summer and autumn of 1944 saw the adoption of the folding-fin R4M unguided rocket for use underneath the wings of the Messerschmitt Me 262 jet fighter for bomber destroyer duties against the USAAF's Eighth Air Force heavy bombers.

The FFAR was developed in the late 1940s by the US Navy's Naval Ordnance Test Center and North American Aviation. Mass production was established at the facilities of the Norris-Thermador Corp., Los Angeles, and the Hunter Douglas Division of the Bridgeport Brass Co., Riverside, California Fuzes were manufactured by the Bulova Watch Co., Jackson Heights, Queens, N.Y., with rocket propellant supplied by Hercules Inc., Wilmington, Delaware, metal parts supplied by Aerojet General, Downey, California, and miscellaneous spare parts were made by North American Aviation.

The original Mk 4 FFAR was about 4 ft (1.2 m) long and weighed 18.5 lb (8.4 kg), with a high-explosive warhead of about 6 lb (2.7 kg). Like the Luftwaffe's R4M projectile of World War II, it had folding fins that flipped out on launch to spin-stabilize the rocket, with the FFAR using half the number (four) of fins in comparison to the R4M's set of eight. Its maximum effective range was about 3,700 yards (3,400 m). Because of its low intrinsic accuracy, it was generally fired in large volleys, with some aircraft carrying as many as 104 rockets.

FFARs were the primary armament of many NATO interceptor aircraft in the early 1950s, including the F-86D, F-89, F-94C, and the CF-100. They were also carried by the F-102 Delta Dagger to supplement its guided missile armament.

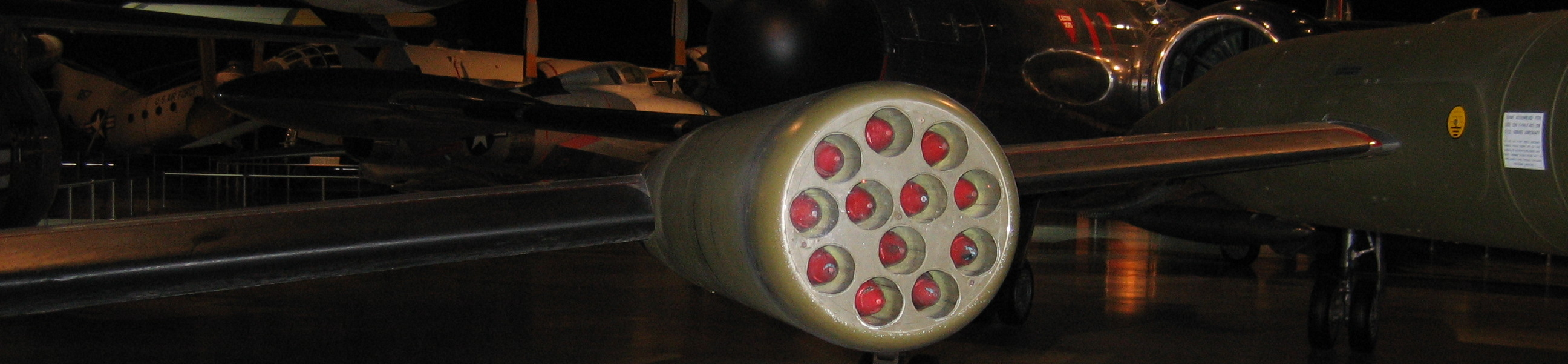
Rocket pod on the wing of a F-94C without its protective fiberglass nose cone

The Mk 4 was dubbed "Mighty Mouse" in service, after the popular cartoon character.

The Mighty Mouse was to prove a poor aerial weapon. Although it was powerful enough to destroy a bomber with a single hit, its accuracy was abysmal. The rockets dispersed widely on launch: a volley of 24 rockets would cover an area the size of a football field. A particularly clear demonstration of this poor accuracy occurred on August 16, 1956, when a pair of U.S. Air Force F-89s were unable to shoot down a runaway U.S. Navy drone aircraft despite expending 208 rockets in the attempt.

As a result, by the late 1950s it had been largely abandoned as an aircraft weapon in favor of the guided air-to-air missiles then becoming available. The Mk 4 found other uses, however, as an air-to-ground weapon, particularly for the new breed of armed helicopter. A volley of FFARs was as devastating as a heavy cannon with far less weight and recoil, and in the ground-attack role its marginal long-range accuracy was less important. It was fitted with a more powerful motor to become the Mk 40. The Mk 40 was a universal motor developed from the Mk 4 2.75 FFAR, and could be fitted with different warheads depending on the mission. Pods (typically carrying seven or 19 rockets) were created for various applications, and a wide variety of specialized warheads were developed for antipersonnel, antitank, and target-marking use.

== US Mk 40 FFAR launchers ==
The United States was the primary user of this type of weapon and developed a number of different launching pods for it. LAU-3 pods were constructed of aluminum-reinforced cardboard and were intended to be disposed of either on the ground after a mission or by dropping them in-flight. With the advent of the armed helicopter, and the increased usage during the Vietnam War, the need for launching pods that were reusable became apparent, so that later models were of all-metal construction. Though the rocket was initially developed by the US Navy, the US Air Force and later US Army were most responsible for the development of rocket pods for all services. These pods are described as follows:

=== US Air Force launchers ===
- Launchers designated under the US Air Force system:

Designation	Description
LAU-3/A	19-Tube 70 mm (2.75”) rocket launcher
LAU-3A/A	LAU-3/A variant; differences unknown
LAU-3B/A	LAU-3A/A variant; differences unknown; US Army XM159
LAU-3C/A	LAU-3B/A variant; supports single or ripple fire
LAU-3D/A	LAU-3C/A variant; differences unknown
LAU-32/A	7-Tube 70 mm (2.75”) rocket launcher
LAU-32A/A	LAU-32/A variant; differences unknown; US Army XM157A
LAU-32B/A	LAU-32A/A variant; differences unknown
LAU-49/A	7-Tube 70 mm (2.75”) rocket launcher
LAU-51/A	19-Tube 70 mm (2.75”) rocket launcher
LAU-59/A	7-Tube 70 mm (2.75”) rocket launcher
LAU-60/A	19-Tube 70 mm (2.75”) rocket launcher; similar to LAU-3/A series except in the position of the grounding safety device
LAU-61/A	19-Tube 70 mm (2.75”) rocket launcher; US Army M159A1
LAU-61A/A	LAU-61/A variant; differences unknown
LAU-61B/A	LAU-61A/A variant; differences unknown
LAU-68/A	7-Tube 70 mm (2.75”) rocket launcher; US Army M158A1
LAU-68A/A	LAU-68/A variant; differences unknown
LAU-68B/A	LAU-68A/A variant; differences unknown
LAU-68C/A	LAU-68/A variant; differences unknown
LAU-69/A	19-tube 70 mm (2.75") rocket launcher; US Army M200A1

=== US Army launchers ===
- Launchers designated under the US Army system:

XM157 rocket pod

XM158 rocket pod

Designation	Description
XM141	Launcher, 2.75-inch rocket, seven-tube, reloadable, reusable; 7-tube 70 mm (2.75”) rocket launcher
XM157A	7-tube 70 mm (2.75") rocket launcher; not compatible with Mk 66 rocket motor; USAF LAU-32A/A
XM157B	XM157A variant; longer launch tubes, capable of further mounting an XM118 dispenser
XM158/M158	Launcher, 2.75-inch rocket, seven-tube, reloadable, reusable, repairable; 7-tube 70 mm (2.75") rocket launcher
M158A1	M158 variant; modified hardback mount; USAF LAU-68/A
XM159	Launcher, 2.75-inch FFAR, 19-tube, reloadable, reusable, not repairable; 19-ube 70 mm (2.75") rocket launcher; USAF LAU-3B/A
XM159B/C	XM159 variants; differences unknown
M159	19-tube 70 mm (2.75") rocket launcher; type standardization of what XM159 unknown
M159A1	M159 variant; differences unknown; USAF LAU-61/A
XM200/M200	19-tube 70 mm (2.75") rocket launcher
M200A1	M200 variant; differences unknown; USAF LAU-69/A
MA-2A	2-tube rocket launcher

Early UH-1B/UH-1C gunships had the XM-3 subsystem using paired 24 round rectangular launchers mounted near the back edge of the sliding side doors. These pods were ground reloadable and were semi-permanent aircraft parts. The mounting point had been used to mount booms for three SS-11 launchers on each side for anti-tank missions. The co-pilot had a roof mounted sight and control box to fire these. Later UH-1C and D aircraft had a mount on each side to carry a seven-round pod coupled with paired M-60D machine guns. Some carried M-134 miniguns with 3,000 rounds per gun instead, though these aircraft were normally used by air cavalry units, not the aerial rocket artillery (ARA) units.

Also various ground launchers using discarded aircraft pods were used for fire base defence. A towed configuration consisting of six 19-round pods called a Slammer was tested for airborne infantry support. The range was approximately 7,000 meters using Hydra 70 family rockets.

== Warheads for the Mk 40 motor ==
With the development of the Mk 40 Mod 0 universal motor came the development of a considerable number of different warheads, as well as a number of different fuzing options. A list of those warheads believed to be developed before the replacement of the Mk 40 motor with the Mk 66 motor is as follows:

=== Fuzing options ===
No.	Designation	Description
1	M423	Point detonating
2	XM438/M438	Point detonating
3	Mk 352 Mod 0/1/2	Point detonating
4	M429	Proximity airburst
5	M442	Airburst, motor-burnout delay
6	Model 113A	Airburst, motor-burnout delay

=== US military warheads ===
Designation	Description	Fuzing options
M151	High explosive (HE)	1,3,4,5
M152	HE w/ red smoke marker	1,3,4,5
M153	HE w/ yellow smoke marker	1,3,4,5
M156	White phosphorus (WP)	1,3,4,5
XM157	Red smoke; compound known as a chemical reaction	1,3,4,5
XM158	Yellow smoke; unknown compound	1,3,4,5
M247	High-explosive anti-tank (HEAT)/high-explosive dual purpose (HEDP)	2 (integral to warhead)
M257	Parachute illumination	5 (integral to warhead)
Mk 67 Mod 0	WP	1,3,4,5
Mk 67 Mod 1	Red phosphorus (RP)	1,3,4,5
WDU-4/A	Anti-personnel warhead containing 2200 20-grain (1.3 g) flechettes	11 (integral to warhead)

== MKE FFAR ==
Turkish company Mechanical and Chemical Industry Corporation produce FFAR under licence. The 70 mm unguided rocket consists of MK40 or MK4 rocket motor, warhead and M423 fuze. The rocket is both air to ground and surface to surface capable.

- Specifications:
  - Total weight: 9.3 kg (with M151 warhead)
  - Overall length: 1.4 m (with M151 warhead)
  - Warhead type: HE M151, TP MK 61 MOD 0, smoke/signaling MKE MOD 248
  - Warhead weight: 3.95 kg (M151)
  - Propellant type: double base N5
  - Range: 7 km (surface to surface)
  - Operation temperature: -54°C to +65°C

== See also ==
- List of rockets
- SNEB
- FZ68 & FZ67 air-to-ground FFAR rocket motor 70mm/2.75"
- CRV-7
- List of U.S. Army rocket launchers by model number
- LOCAT - used three FFAR rockets
- Battle of Palmdale
