= Land drains =

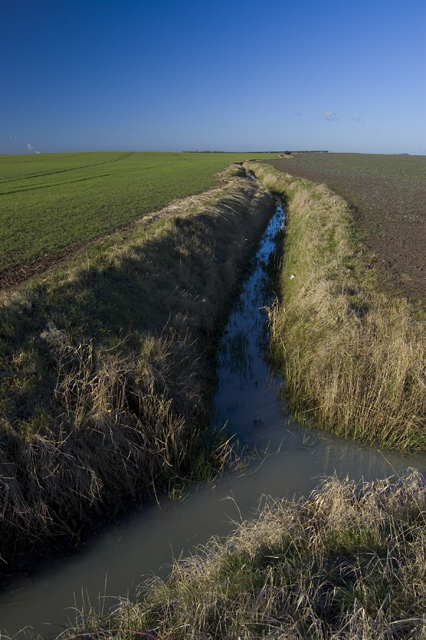
Land drains near Halsham, England

The purpose of a land drain is to allow water in wet or swampy ground to rapidly drain away or to relieve hydrostatic pressure. They are subterranean linear structures which are laid to a fall which should be as steep as practicable. They are used in agriculture and in building construction sites. Modern land drains take the form of a perforated or discontinuous (i.e. open-jointed) pipe. Typically, the land drains conduct the surplus water to an open ditch or natural water source.

== In agriculture ==
Traditionally, land drains were formed in clay soils and peats by excavating a trench and forming a "tunnel" using flat stones. This was very labour-intensive but could often be done using free materials at hand. Typically they were two to three feet (600mm-900mm) below the surface. Agricultural land drains have to be installed sufficiently deep to avoid plough damage. In 1843 in England short earthenware pipes were first used laid edge to edge. The earliest type consisted of a "u" shaped trough onto which a flat lid was placed. Later the extruded clay pipe was developed. These are still used. These can be laid in an excavated trench, or a horizontal hole is formed in the ground using a mole plough and the pipes are forced in by means of a hand or mechanical press. By this means, heavy wet soils, bogs and swamps could be rendered amendable to agriculture. Virtually all crops need a well-drained soil to grow well.

== Modern land drains ==
Many modern land drains are created utilising rigid or flexible plastic pipes pierced with holes, laid in pea gravel. (The pea gravel is pea-sized pebbles without sharp points to damage the pipe.) Geotextile material can surround the gravel to keep out silt. This can be installed in an excavated trench. Specialised mole ploughs are available that can form the hole, insert the perforated pipe (and gravel if required), all in one simultaneous and continuous process. An extremely powerful (usually tracked) tractor is necessary. The flexible pipe is carried as a roll on the back of the machine. There is sometimes a hopper for gravel which is kept topped up by an adjacent machine. The pipe and gravel go down apertures in the plough blade as the tractor proceeds along the desired route.

== In building construction ==
The purpose of land drains in building construction is somewhat different. If voids are created in the ground for any reason they tend to fill with water. Also the static loads on any subterranean structure and retaining walls can be massively increased by the presence of water in the surrounding ground. Land drains are introduced to relieve this pressure. Traditionally, the drains were created by backfilling behind retaining walls etc. with rubble and allowing the water to drain through the rubble to some suitable point.

== As part of highway construction ==
Instead of having open ditches at the side of highways, land drains can be installed. The excavated trenches are completely filled with gravel (i.e., no soil cover). This is far safer than open trenches if a vehicle should run off the highway.

== Problems ==
Holes or gaps have to be left in the pipes to allow water to transfer from the subsoil to the pipe and these tend to block with soil or allow silt into the pipe, so blocking it or reducing the flow of water. This can be partially overcome by surrounding the pipes with gravel. However, with time even the gravel becomes choked with soil/silt, so in the latest practice, the gravel is surrounded with a geotextile material which filters out soil particles. Ideally, land drains are laid with access points so that high pressure water jetting is possible to clear silt. However, whatever the technology, all land drains have a finite life and eventually become ineffective due to the ingress of silt and/or the blocking of the surrounding filter media.
