= Dry rot treatment =

Techniques used to eliminate dry rot fungus

Dry rot treatment refers to techniques used to eliminate dry rot fungus and alleviate the damage done by the fungus to human-built wooden structures.

Dry rot (Serpula lacrymans) is considered difficult to remove, requiring drastic action. Remedial timber treatment and damp proofing companies typically recommend stripping out of building fabric beyond the visible extent of the infestation and the use of fungicide. More holistic approaches attempt to eradicate dry rot by controlling the local environment to reduce timber moisture levels and increase ventilation in order to promote drying.

The first priority when treating dry rot is to find and remove the dampness within the building that caused the outbreak, and to promote drying out by taking measures, such as increasing ventilation. Treatment approaches differ after these steps are taken.

== Mycology of S. lacrymans ==
S. lacrymans is a form of brown rot, a group of fungi which digest the cellulose and hemicellulose in timber. This particular species poses the greatest threat to buildings since it can spread through non-nutrient providing materials (e.g., masonry and plaster) for several meters until it finds more timber to attack.

Dry rot is spread by spores which are present in most buildings. The minimum moisture content of timber for spore germination is 28–30% (lower than other rots), and the relative humidity must be in excess of 95%. Spores are resistant to desiccation and may still be viable for germination when they are several years old.

If conditions are suitable, the spore will germinate producing microscopic fungal threads called hyphae.

	Minimum	Optimum	Maximum
Temperature (°C)	−5–+5	15–22	30–40
Timber Moisture Content (%)	22–25	20–55	55–90

Table 1. Environmental conditions for mycelial growth following germination

The average moisture content of modern softwood timbers in dry buildings is generally in the range of 12–15%, and heating systems may reduce this to a far lower level. There is, therefore, no prospect of a dry rot infestation developing in a building that has been properly designed, constructed, and maintained.

Once the environment starts to dry out, the rot will become dormant and eventually die. The length of time that the fungus can remain dormant under dry conditions seems to depend on the temperature, with approximate times of nine years at 7.5 °C and one year at 22 °C being quoted.

Most fungi will only thrive in acid conditions, but dry rot will remain active in alkaline conditions. This gives it the ability to grow through damp mortar, masonry, and plaster, infecting other areas of the building. Thick, conducting strands known as rhizomorphs, are produced to cross inert surfaces and penetrate masonry.

A fruiting body (sporophore) may develop naturally or in response to unfavourable conditions of humidity, temperature or exhaustion of nutrients. Often the stress that provokes this is the exposure of the infestation. The fruiting body will produce millions of rust brown spores.

One belief held about dry rot is that, once established, it can survive by producing water by breaking down the timber if the original source of water is removed. Laboratory experiments conducted in 1932 on timber samples in unventilated glass jars showed that significant quantities of water were indeed produced. However these experiments do not replicate the "real world" environment of a building where processes of evaporation and capillary action in the wood will be removing moisture from the area faster than it can be produced by the fungus.

Another misconception is that dry rot can transport water from a source over considerable distances to an area of dry timber so that it can decay there. While the mycelium strands do conduct a nutrient solution around the fungus, it has been shown that any ability to transport water to "wet up" dry timber is limited.

Despite being a successful coloniser of buildings, for reasons that have not yet been fully explained, S. lacrymans is rarely found growing in the wild. Occasional specimens have been found in the foothills of the Indian Himalayas, Mt. Shasta in California, and woodlands in Czechoslovakia.

== Treatment methods ==
=== Introduction ===
The first step in any course of treatment is to make the necessary repairs to the building defects (overflowing gutters, blocked airbricks, missing slates, etc.) that allowed the ingress of dampness. The treatment methods described below assume that the dry rot has been positively identified, the full extent of the rot ascertained, and that the building is now water tight.

A number of methods of attacking dry rot have been developed which can be classified as follows:

- Orthodox – emphasis on the use of chemical fungicides
- Environmental – emphasis on controlling the fungus by controlling environmental conditions
- Heat treatment – exploiting the fungus' sensitivity to heat
- Biological treatment – use of competitor organisms

The latter two methods are included for completeness as they are currently not widely used. The main purpose of this article is to compare the orthodox and environmental approaches.

=== "Orthodox" treatment for dry rot ===
The following description for the treatment of dry rot is typical of traditional methods:

1. Cut out all wood showing decay, presence of white mycelium, etc. and all apparently sound timber within a radius of one metre of the nearest visibly decayed timber. Burn all such material.
2. Hack off all plaster/render and remove any skirtings, panelling, linings and ceilings necessary to trace the fullest extent of the growth over or through adjacent masonry, concrete or timber surfaces.
3. Clean off with a wire brush all surfaces and any steel and pipe work within the area up to a radius of 1.5 metres from the furthest extent of suspected infection. Remove from the building all dust and debris ensuing from the work.
4. Apply fungicide to all such masonry, concrete and earth surfaces at the specified rate. Apply two generous coats of fungicide to all timber surfaces to a distance of 1.5 metres from the cutting away. (Allow first coat to be absorbed before applying second coat)
5. Use only fully preservative-treated timber for replacement.
6. Replaster with zinc oxychloride (ZOC) plaster or, for areas not to be replastered, apply two coats of ZOC paint.

As can be seen from stages 1 and 2, this involves the removal of a considerable quantity of building fabric.

The desire to kill the fungal strands within all materials adjoining the affected timber has led to the practice of "wall irrigation" at stage 4. This entails saturating the masonry with a water-soluble fungicide at a rate of about 10 litres/m^{3}. Walls of more than half-brick thickness need to be drilled at 230 millimetres (9.1 in) spacing to a depth of just over half the wall thickness. Walls of over 460 millimetres (18 in) thickness should be drilled from both sides. Fungicide is then injected into the holes, and the wall surfaces are sprayed.

Ensuring thorough penetration of fungicide throughout the structure of a non-homogeneous wall is extremely difficult. "There is no practical way of ensuring that all dry rot strands within a wall are killed."

A more recent variation of the practice of wall irrigation is the "toxic box" where the area of irrigation is reduced to forming a margin around the perimeter of the wall thereby containing the fungus within the wall. Here it can do no harm and will eventually die for lack of food.

Application of fungicides to the timber at stage 4 may be by brush, spray or injected under pressure into holes drilled into the wood. Preservatives based on organic solvents are used as these have better penetration into wood than water based solutions. Examples of suitable organic solvents include the following: (--- please provide examples)

Alternatively pastes consisting of a fungicide in an oil/water emulsion may be applied to the timber.

In addition to more conventional fungicides, boron-based fungicide can be supplied in glass-like rods which are inserted into holes drilled into the wood. Boron is commonly available as the laundry supplement Borax, and as boric acid which is commonly available from pharmacists or in cockroach pesticides. Boron rods are soluble and should the timber become damp the rod will gradually dissolve diffusing preservative into the damp area. Their use is particularly appropriate for areas that are at risk but not yet affected. A surfactant such as dish soap, is recommended in water-based preparations.

It has been reported that boron fungicides react with the cellular structure of the wood whereby the boron is deposited, and it is this process which can to varying extents harden the dry rot, depending on the degree of degradation of the wood. However, structural members should be remediated by sistering in new wood after the fungus issue has been dealt with.

Boron/glycol preservatives consist of an inorganic boron preservative dissolved in a glycol to produce a paste. These are water-soluble and will readily diffuse into damp wood, even from the surface, and therefore offer better penetration than more conventional fungicide products, where it is necessary to penetrate damp wood.

Glycol solutions have an advantage in that they can be applied over paint.

Glycol and boron solutions are hydrophilic (water-loving) and react with the water in wood, making it unavailable for the fungus. This is why dry rot can seem to be a little stringy; cells grown in drier periods are smaller than the larger, "plumper" cells that grow in Spring, as can be seen in tree rings used to tell how old the tree is. This moister Spring growth contains the moisture the fungus consumes, in addition to that available from leaks for example.

Water-based fungicides, because they are water-based, can be washed away in time if the wood they are applied to keeps getting wet. This is another reason why it is important to fix leaks, thus keeping the wood dry in an alkaline environment, and seal the wood (especially the end grain) to prevent ongoing exposure to hungry spores.

Fungicides to defeat brown rot include: baking soda, hydrogen peroxide, tea tree oil, boron solutions, ethylene glycol or propylene glycol, vinegar, etc. Since the dry rot fungus requires an acidic environment from pH 0 to 5.5, certain of these fungicides work because they change the pH.

Recipes for homemade fungicide solutions, wood hardeners and penetrating epoxies have been reported on the web in addition to commercially available products. (It would be appreciated if you could improve this page by providing information about tests showing the efficacy of different treatments.)

=== "Environmental" treatment of dry rot ===
The environmental approach can be defined as "the exploitation of the environmental sensitivity of the dry rot fungus for its treatment".

A step-by-step procedure for using the environmental approach would be:

1. Promote the drying out of the affected areas (e.g., by introducing forced ventilation from fans). Do not re-plaster, redecorate or otherwise cover up affected timbers until thoroughly dried out.
2. Identify, with the assistance of a structural engineer where required, any timber that requires replacement or strengthening due to loss of structural strength and carry out these works. Retain as much original fabric as possible, especially in historic buildings.
3. Isolate timbers from other materials that will take a long time to dry out.
4. Increase the ventilation of the area if this is insufficient, by introducing extra air bricks etc.
5. Implement a regular schedule of inspection and maintenance for the building to tackle future problems early on and/or install monitoring equipment.

An example of the situation to which Stage 3 refers would be where a solid stone wall has become soaked due to a gutter becoming blocked and rainwater allowed to overflow down the wall for a period of time. Roof timbers may rest on top of the wall. Even when the ingress of water has been stopped and good ventilation established, it will take a considerable length of time for the wall to dry out. During this time, it is probable that there will be sufficient moisture present to allow fungal growth to continue. In this situation it may be necessary to isolate the timber from the masonry; doing so using products such as DPC material can actually trap moisture in the timber. Where the ends of timbers were originally built into a wall and have rotted, these may be cut off flush with the wall and reattached using joist hangers.

Alternatively, the use of pastes and boron rods would be justified in this instance. "Preservative treatments may be essential in some situations if the spread of the fungus is to be restricted and critical timbers are to be protected while the structure dries."

The environmental approach emphasises the need for continued monitoring to ensure that future building defects do not start a new outbreak of dry rot or reactivate a dormant one. While in a simple small building this may be accomplished by regular maintenance inspections, systems are available that can monitor a large building with readings from moisture sensors being remotely monitored by a computer.

=== Heat treatment ===
Other treatments have been tried that attempt to exploit the dry rot's sensitivity to heat. The use of a blowlamp to kill dry rot by applying heat to the surface of affected areas was popular at one time. Obviously, this led to the risk of fire. Experiments showed that a surface temperature of about 100 °C (212 °F) would have to be maintained for up to five hours in order to produce a temperature that would be lethal to fungus within a 230 millimetres (9.1 in) thick wall.

In Denmark, a procedure has been developed whereby the building, or the affected part thereof, is tented and heated by hot air to kill dry rot. A temperature of 40 °C (104 °F) is achieved at the centre of masonry and timbers and maintained for twenty-four hours. However, the question could be asked as to why someone should expend large amounts of energy heating the entire building to a high temperature when all that is needed to kill the rot is to dry it out.

A treatment system using microwaves has also been tried. Further research will be needed before its effectiveness can be assessed.

=== Biological control ===
A further possible way of combating dry rot is by the use of antagonistic organisms that reduce the ability of the decay fungus to colonise or degrade the wood. The principle here is that when in a building the fungus is not in its natural environment and therefore natural competitors are unlikely to be present. It may, however, be possible to introduce these competitors into the building environment to control the dry rot.

Trichoderma fungi remove some structural carbohydrates from the wood necessary for the colonisation and initiation of decay by wood-destroying fungi, and laboratory tests have shown the ability of Trichoderma fungi to kill S. lacrymans. Field trials have also been carried out investigating the ability of Trichoderma fungi to prevent rot in electrical distribution poles, with mixed results.

This sort of biocontrol shows promise in the laboratory but is disappointing in the field, and more work will need to be done. As yet, biological control methods have not become established.

There are also issues with the allergenic potential of Trichoderma that may limit its use in situations where human contact is likely.

== Criticisms of the orthodox approach ==
Proponents of the environmental approach argue that the drastic action of the orthodox approach is in line with the popular misconception that dry rot is extremely difficult to eradicate. Conversely, they would claim that it is not unusually resilient and is in fact environmentally sensitive. Indeed, this environmental sensitivity may account for why it is so unsuccessful in the wild and may be used against it when encountered in buildings.

Perhaps the most criticised aspect of the orthodox approach is the practice of wall irrigation. As stated above, this entails introducing large quantities of water-based fungicide into the building fabric. But this is at a time when the primary concern should be to dry the building out.

Excessive water content in the wall will also cause a high risk of efflorescence of salts out of the wall as it dries, thereby damaging plaster and other finishes. Any such salts deposited on the wall surface may contain the fungicide used in the treatment, thereby creating a potential health hazard.

The ability of irrigation to kill all the fungus within the wall is also questionable, as thorough penetration of the fungicide throughout a non-homogeneous wall is unlikely, resulting in patchy treatment. Case studies have been cited where dry rot has emerged from walls that had previously been "sterilised" by irrigation—in one case, from a wall that had been treated twice before.

It is questionable whether it is necessary to take steps to kill the fungus within the wall at all as the fungal strands are not causing damage to the masonry itself. Instead, they are merely passing through the wall in search of more timber to attack. The "toxic box" technique, as described above, confines the irrigation to the perimeter of the wall. Even the toxic box method has been found to be of limited use. The doubts about complete penetration of any masonry remain, so it is questionable whether a complete barrier of treated material can be formed around the edge of the wall.

The orthodox approach requires that all timbers left in place are protected by the application of a preservative fungicide. As with masonry, it is not easy to achieve full penetration of the timber. The penetration of surface sprays and conventional pastes is severely compromised by high moisture levels in wood. Injection techniques do force fluid within the timber, but distribution throughout the entire piece of wood can be patchy. The use of boron/glycol preservatives do show improved penetration.

Another criticism of the orthodox approach is the sheer amount of building fabric that is removed and the consequent amount of remedial work and disruption to the use of the building. Wall irrigation requires the drilling of a large number of holes into masonry.

=== Human health concerns ===
One argument put forward by the supporters of the environmental approach concerns the potential effect on human health of the large quantities of toxic chemicals used in orthodox treatments. Typical quotations are: "chemical control methods cause extensive environmental degradation, pose potential hazards to wildlife and are of grave concern to public health bodies" and "many cases of illness including headaches, respiratory problems and chest pains, to name a few, have been linked to the use of such agents within buildings. Furthermore, clinical evaluation has tended to validate these concerns".

However, others argue that none of the products employed over the last twenty to thirty years have been proven to be harmful to people when used properly. Furthermore, there is a major difference between the use of wood preservatives and pesticides in other situations, especially agriculture, as wood preservatives are put on and into the timber and are designed to stay there for 50 or more years. Pesticides in agriculture, on the other hand, are released into an open environment.

Generally, the toxicity of the fungicides used by the industry has been reduced since 1991 with chemicals such as dieldrin, pentachlorophenol, and tributyltin oxide being replaced by organo-boron esters, permethrin, and boron/glycol mixes. One way of comparing the toxicity of chemicals is by LD_{50}, which gives the dose relative to bodyweight sufficient to kill 50% of the test population (usually rats).

Chemical	Lethal Dose LD50 (mg/kg body weight)
Dieldrin	10
Pentachlorophenol	27
Tributyltin oxide	200
Aspirin	1000
Organo-boron esters	1700
Sodium chloride (salt)	3000
Permethrin	4570
Boron/glycol preservatives	8000–15000

Table 2. Relative toxicities of chemicals

Boron-based compounds are toxic to fungi, but their effects on mammals are minimal. However, conventional wood preservatives consist of the active ingredient and a solvent, and it is the organic solvents that seem to give more cause for concern. No ill effects appear to be produced by limited exposure to hydrocarbon solvent vapour, but a higher degree of exposure may cause symptoms such as headaches and nausea, which disappear as soon as exposure ceases.

Some evidence has been produced recently that workers exposed to high levels of solvents over a number of years may develop damage to the central nervous system, but the studies have not been conclusive. This suggests that sufficient ventilation in the treated area until the product is dry is all that is required to prevent any discomfort from the solvent.

Dr. David Watt, in an article published in the Journal of Nutritional and Environmental Medicine, is more cautious:

Chemical treatments used for the control or eradication of fungal infections and/or insect infestations in buildings and the residues of such treatments do not pose a proven hazard to the general population. There is, however, an apparent potential risk from such treatments and from the presence of treatment residues in treated buildings for persons who suffer from chemical sensitivity... it is concluded that further investigation and evaluation is required of alternative chemical and non-chemical treatments of fungal infections and/or insect infestations in buildings.

Watt treats the fungicide as a whole in his article: i.e., he does not separate out the effects of the active ingredients and the solvent.

=== Environmental concerns ===
It has been stated that none of the treatment products used over the last twenty to thirty years have been proven to have caused any damage to the environment when properly used except in the isolated case of bats. However, in the UK at least, this is a major consideration, as bats are protected under the Wildlife and Countryside Act 1981, which states that harming them or disturbing their roosts is a criminal offence.

Local damage to the environment will result when pesticides are discharged to the ground or rivers due to accident or dumping. Obviously, there is always the possibility that any chemical will not be used correctly, either through ignorance or malice, and the proponents of the environmental approach would argue that there is no need to use large quantities of chemicals anyway when there is a risk, however small.

== Effectiveness of treatments ==
Experience from companies involved in environmental control and research findings confirm that in most situations dry rot can be fully controlled simply by altering the environment in which it is growing. The Dry Rot Research Group at the University of Abertay have conducted laboratory trials of the environmental control of dry rot on full size models of a floor/wall junction, a window, and a roof/wall junction. The full results are published in a research report by Historic Scotland and conclusively show how the growth of dry rot can be controlled simply by varying the available moisture in the environment.

A case study of successful environmental control of dry rot in a large building is included as an appendix in Historic Scotland's "Technical Advice Note 24". Case studies are also quoted in Dr. Brian Ridout's book Timber Decay in Buildings, The Conservation Approach to Treatment.

=== Costs ===
With all treatment methods, the costs of the repairs to rectify the building defects that permitted the ingress of moisture will be the same. The overall cost of using the environmental approach to the treatment of dry rot is likely to be less than the orthodox approach.

Dr. Ridout quotes a case study where an initial quote for orthodox treatment of a building was £23,000 but subsequent treatment by environmental methods resulted in a saving of one third in remedial works and timber replacement. Where it is decided to install moisture monitoring equipment, this will represent an additional capital outlay.

In the United States, costs can vary widely depending on the extent of the damage and the type of repair required. For example, SFW Construction, a contractor specializing in dry rot repair, reports that minor cases such as small patches on wood siding or window trim typically cost around $1,500–$2,800, while extensive structural repairs can range from $4,500 to $12,000.

=== Guarantees ===
There is a perception amongst the general public that dry rot is difficult to eradicate. It has "instilled fear and dread for centuries". It is, therefore, not surprising that if a property owner is told that they have such a serious problem, they will expect that drastic action will be required to fix it.

It could be argued that, if a reputable and specialist contractor is employed to administer the orthodox treatment, this has the advantage of coming with the reassurance of a guarantee. Guarantees against the recurrence of dry rot started to be issued in the 1950s, covering treated timbers for a period of 20 years. This period was soon extended to 30 years.

However, the usefulness of the guarantees has been questioned over the inclusion of clauses that exclude liability if the timber is allowed to get wet again during the guarantee period.

An example of the courts enforcing a guarantee is the case of Ackerman v Protim Services (1988). In this case, dry rot recurred in a bressummer some eight years after it had been treated for a previous outbreak. The 20-year guarantee issued by the treatment company had a clause that excluded liability if recurrence was due to "a failure to keep the property in a dry and weatherproof condition and in a good and proper state of maintenance".

The UK Court of Appeal held that the guarantee was not invalidated by this clause because the wall into which the timber was built was damp due to the nature of the construction of the building, not through any lapse in maintenance by the owners. But the clear implication of this is that if the timber had become wet because the property owners had not maintained the building properly, then the guarantee would have become void. In other words, the client is protected against the recurrence of dry rot provided that the conditions that allow dry rot to occur do not recur.

Graham Coleman, a leading specialist in damp treatment and timber decay, makes the same point on his website:

But then dry wood doesn't rot – so what is actually being 'guaranteed? Certainly not any chemical treatment that has been applied since it is clearly implied that if treated timber becomes damp it will rot. So what was the value of the preservative treatment? Obviously none!

Guarantees are therefore of questionable value and may be difficult to enforce. However, the point will still be raised that if the fungicide treatment is really effective, it should not matter whether or not the treated timber gets wet again. If, on the other hand, a fungicide-treated piece of timber must be kept dry to stop it rotting, it cannot be much more resistant to rot than wood that has not been treated.

In fact, guarantees for chemical dry rot treatments may be harmful as they may lure the building owners into a false sense of security by allowing them to feel that they can afford to be less diligent with property maintenance.

== Historic buildings ==
Richard Oxley of Oxley Conservation states that many remedial timber treatment companies simply do not know enough about the construction of historic buildings to be in a position to advise on appropriate repairs and treatments. He has experience of irreparable damage being done through such lack of knowledge (Oxley, 1995) as does Dr Ridout.

The methods and approaches used to assess and repair timbers in historic buildings have changed considerably in recent years, with a move away from wall irrigation, damage to decorative features during invasive survey work, and unnecessary cutting out or chemical treatment of timbers.

With its emphasis on reducing the amount of building fabric to be removed, the environmental approach obviously has attractions for heritage organisations whose primary purpose is to preserve buildings. A number of these organisations support the environmental approach, for example Dr. Brian Ridout's book Timber Decay in Buildings, The Conservation Approach to Treatment being jointly published by English Heritage and Historic Scotland. Historic Scotland's "Technical Advice Note 24" advocates the use of environmental treatment of dry rot, as does advice on the Society for the Preservation of Ancient Building's website.

== See also ==
- Damp (structural)
