= Mole plough =

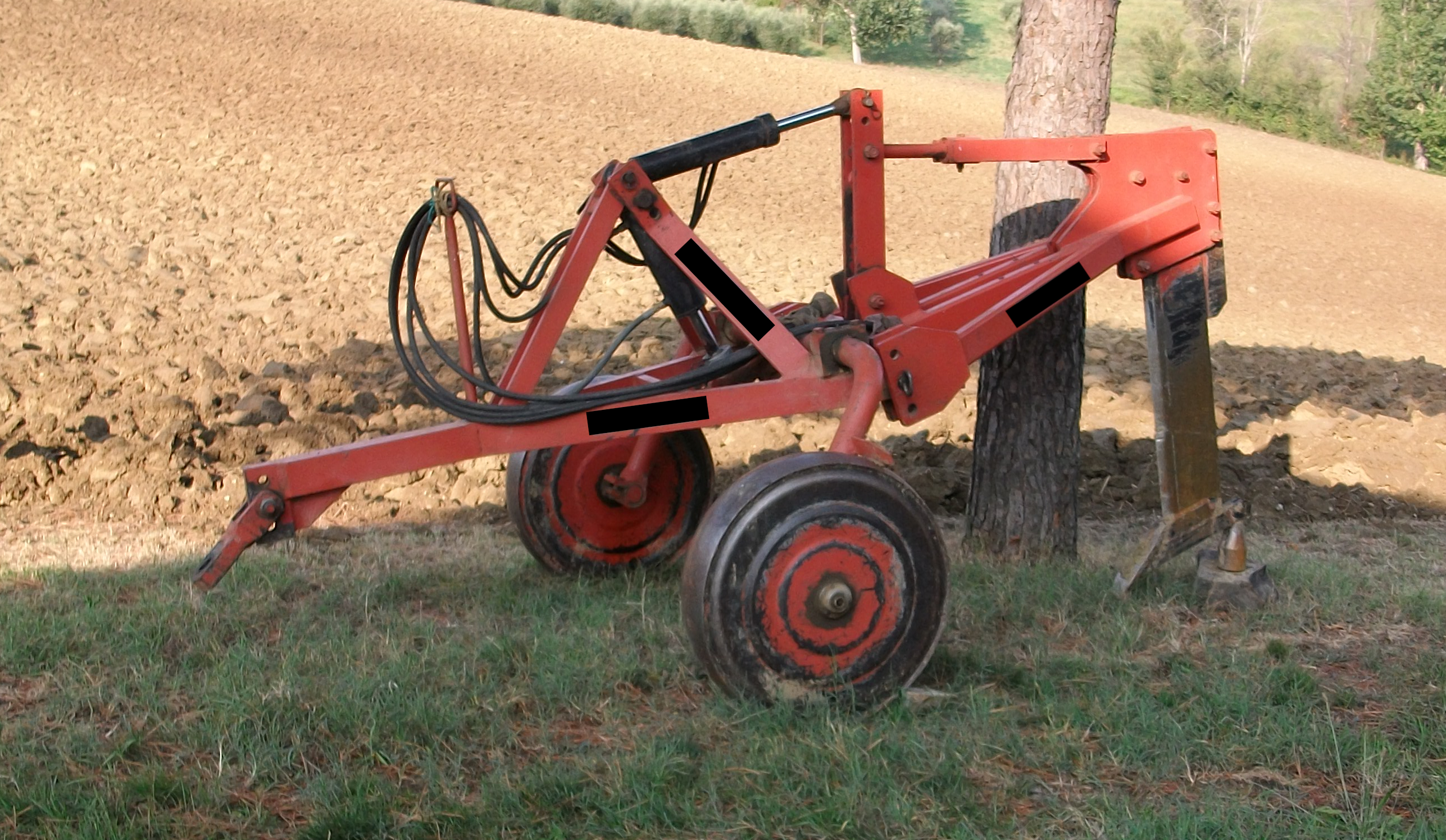
Trailed mole plough with single tooth

A mole plough is a piece of agricultural equipment used to create underground drainage channels – called mole drains – in poorly permeable clay soils. This drainage technique is known as mole drainage. The mole plough is primarily used to dry out wet fields and pastures. The cracks it creates in the topsoil help guide excess water toward the mole drains, which helps control the water table and maintain a sufficiently dry and stable soil for supporting heavy agricultural machinery.

A mole plough should not be confused with a subsoiler, an agricultural tool used to loosen compacted soil layers. A mole plough has a torpedo-shaped bullet followed by an expander. The diameter of the mole is slightly larger than that of the torpedo, allowing the mole drain to be smoothed and consolidated. Mole ploughs are used to create drainage without tiles. A different form of this implement (with a single blade), a pipe-and-cable-laying plough, is used to lay buried cables or pipes, without the need to dig a deep trench and re-fill it. In contrast, a trencher does create a trench of about 1 m in which the drainage pipe is laid. A layer of approximately 55 cm of highly permeable material (such as gravel) is placed on top of the main drain. Mole drains are then pulled perpendicular to the main drains to a depth of around 65 cm. In this way, the mole drains intersect the permeable layer above the main drain every so often, allowing the water to be drained.

Agricultural machinery that is not powered by human labour generally come in three types: self-propelled, trailed, or mounted. A self-propelled implement has its own drive system. Trailed and mounted implements, on the other hand, require an external traction vehicle such as a tractor. A trailed implement has its own chassis, while a mounted one does not, and is instead raised or lowered using the tractor’s hydraulic system. The mole plough is typically used in a mounted version. However, in countries like the United Kingdom – where fields are generally larger – trailed mole ploughs are also common. In both cases, the tool is operated by a tractor.

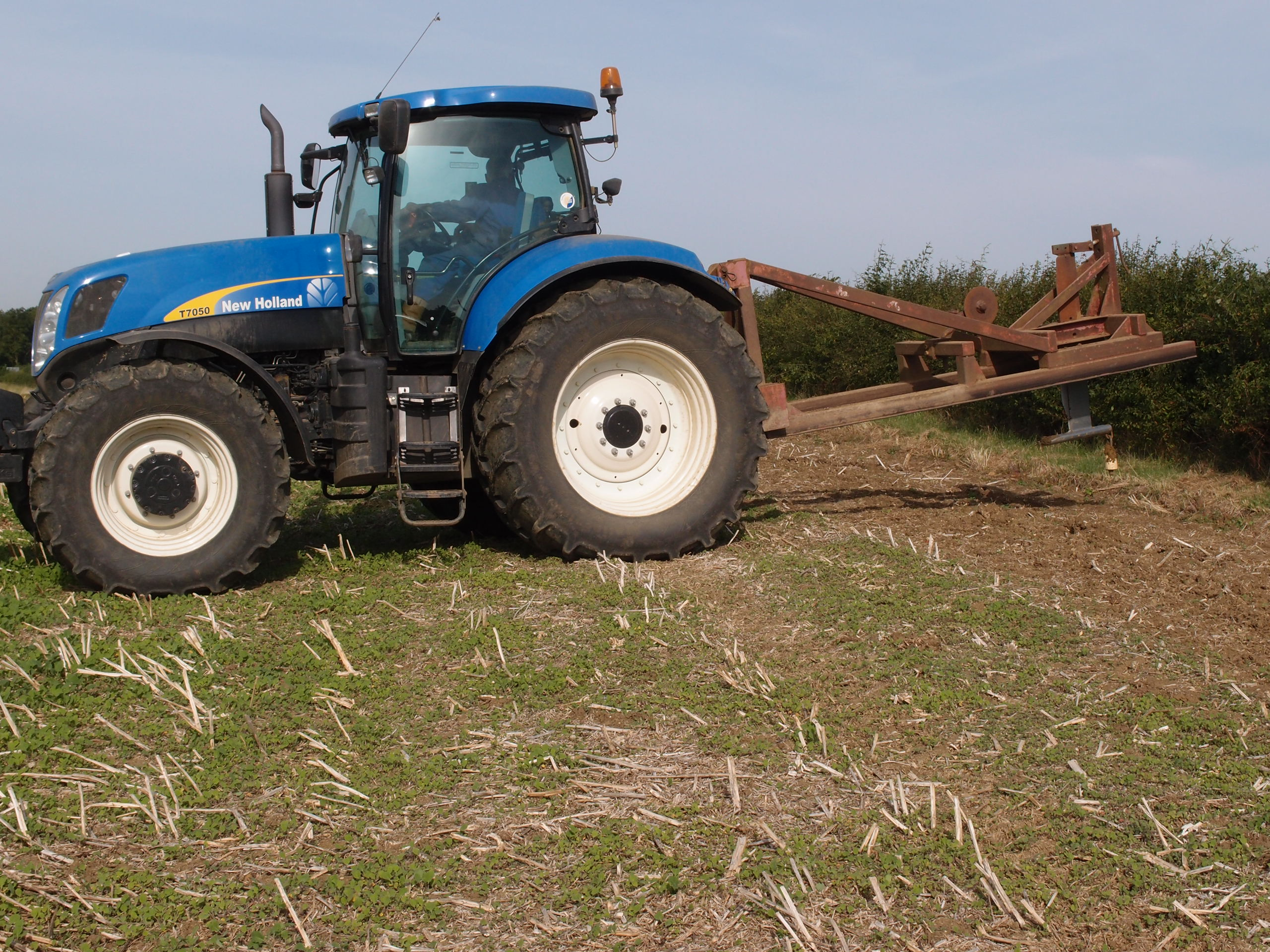
Mounted mole plough with single mole foot

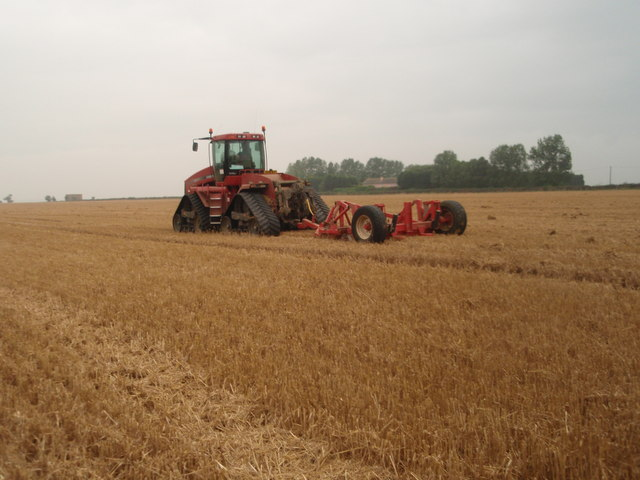
Trailed mole plough with double agitator legs
