= Old River, California =

Unincorporated community in California, United States

- Unincorporated community Census-designated place
- Location in California Old River, California (the United States)
- Coordinates: 35°16′1.65″N 119°6′19.88″W
- Country: United States
- State: California
- County: Kern

Area
  - Total: 0.985 sq mi (2.55 km^{2})
  - Land: 0.985 sq mi (2.55 km^{2})
  - Water: 0 sq mi (0 km^{2})
- Elevation: 341 ft (104 m)

Population (2020)
  - Total: 123
  - Density: 125/sq mi (48.2/km^{2})
- Time zone: UTC-8 (Pacific)
  - Summer (DST): UTC-7 (PDT)
- GNIS feature ID: 2804424

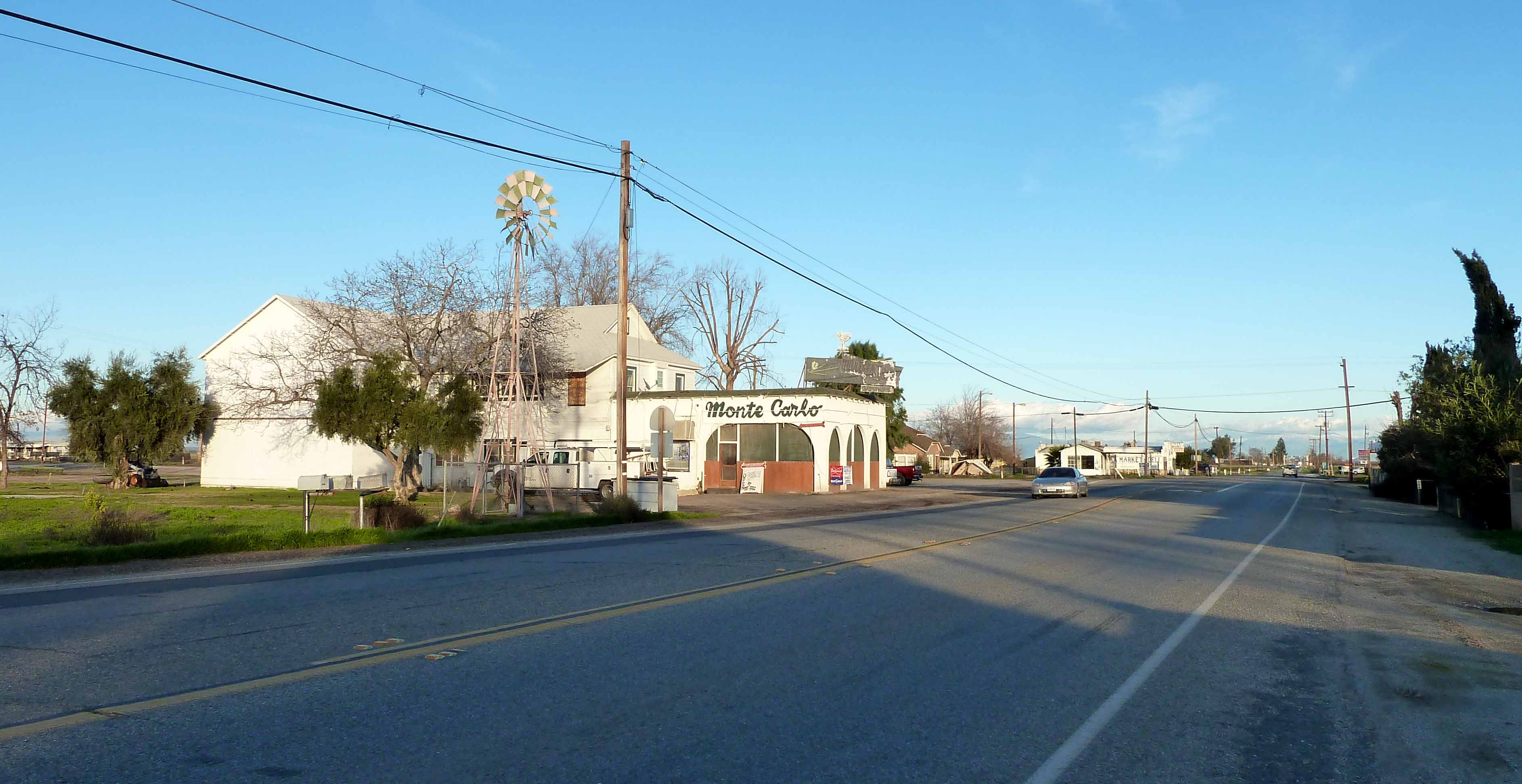
Old River

Old River is an unincorporated community and census-designated place (CDP) in Kern County, California, United States. It is located 9.5 miles (15 km) southwest of Bakersfield, at an elevation of 341 feet (104 m). As of the 2020 census, Old River had a population of 123.

The settlement was founded in the 1870s and named after the old Kern River bed.

== Demographics ==
Historical population
Census	Pop.	Note	%±
2020	123		—
U.S. Decennial Census; 1860–1870 1880-1890; 1900 1910 1920; 1930 1940 1950; 1960 1970 1980; 1990 2000 2010; 2020

Old River first appeared as a census designated place in the 2020 U.S. census.

=== 2020 Census ===
Old River CDP, California – Racial and ethnic composition Note: the US Census treats Hispanic/Latino as an ethnic category. This table excludes Latinos from the racial categories and assigns them to a separate category. Hispanics/Latinos may be of any race.
Race / Ethnicity (NH = Non-Hispanic)	Pop 2020	% 2020
White alone (NH)	39	31.71%
Black or African American alone (NH)	0	0.00%
Native American or Alaska Native alone (NH)	0	0.00%
Asian alone (NH)	0	0.00%
Native Hawaiian or Pacific Islander alone (NH)	0	0.00%
Other race alone (NH)	3	2.44%
Mixed race or Multiracial (NH)	2	1.63%
Hispanic or Latino (any race)	79	64.23%
Total	123	100.00%
