= Subsoiler =

Farm implement

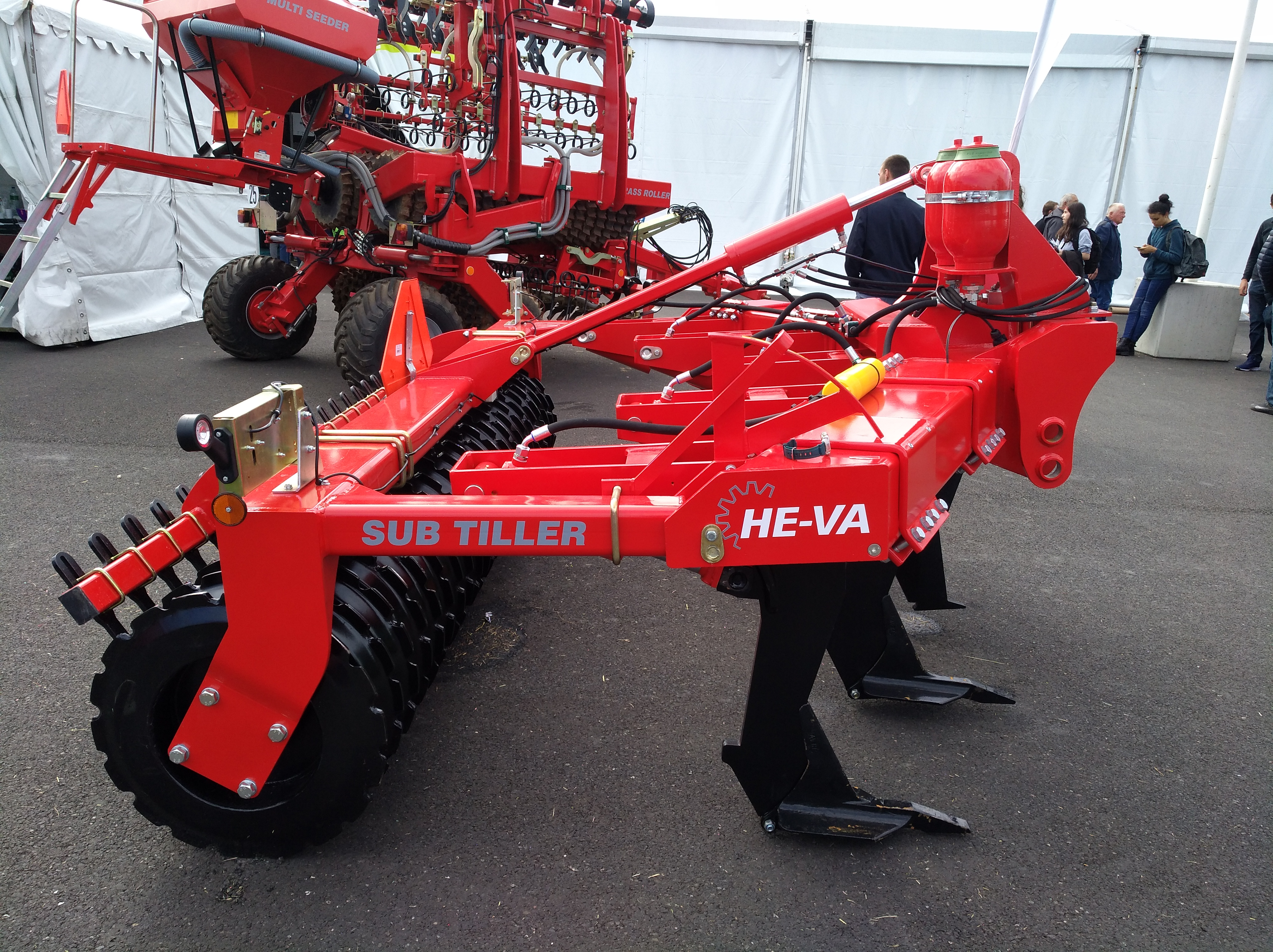
Subsoiler with a tooth packer roller

A subsoiler or flat lifter is a piece of agricultural equipment used for deep tillage, loosening and breaking up soil at depths below the levels worked by moldboard ploughs, disc harrows, or rototillers. Most such tools will break up and turn over surface soil to a depth of 15–20 cm (6–8 in), whereas a subsoiler will break up and loosen soil to twice those depths.

A subsoiler should not be confused with a mole plough: an agricultural implement used to create underground drainage channels, a technique known as mole drainage. The subsoiler is a tillage tool which will improve growth in all crops where soil compaction is a problem. In agriculture angled wings are used to lift and shatter the hardpan that builds up due to compaction. The design provides deep tillage, loosening soil deeper than a tiller or plough is capable of reaching. Agricultural subsoilers, according to the Unverferth Company, can disrupt hardpan ground down to 60 cm (24 in) depths. When a field is optimally subsoiled, crops will perform well during hot and dry seasons because roots penetrate soil layers deeper to reach moisture and nutrients. In wet conditions, the water passes more easily through the shattered areas, reducing the possibility of crops drowning.

Agricultural implements that are not powered by human labor typically come in three types: self-propelled, trailed, or mounted. A self-propelled implement has its own drive system. Trailed and mounted implements, on the other hand, require an external power unit, such as a tractor. A trailed implement has its own chassis, while a mounted implement does not and is therefore lifted and lowered by the tractor's hydraulic system. Subsoilers are most commonly found in a mounted configuration. In countries where fields are generally larger, trailed subsoilers are also common. In both cases, a tractor is used as the power source.

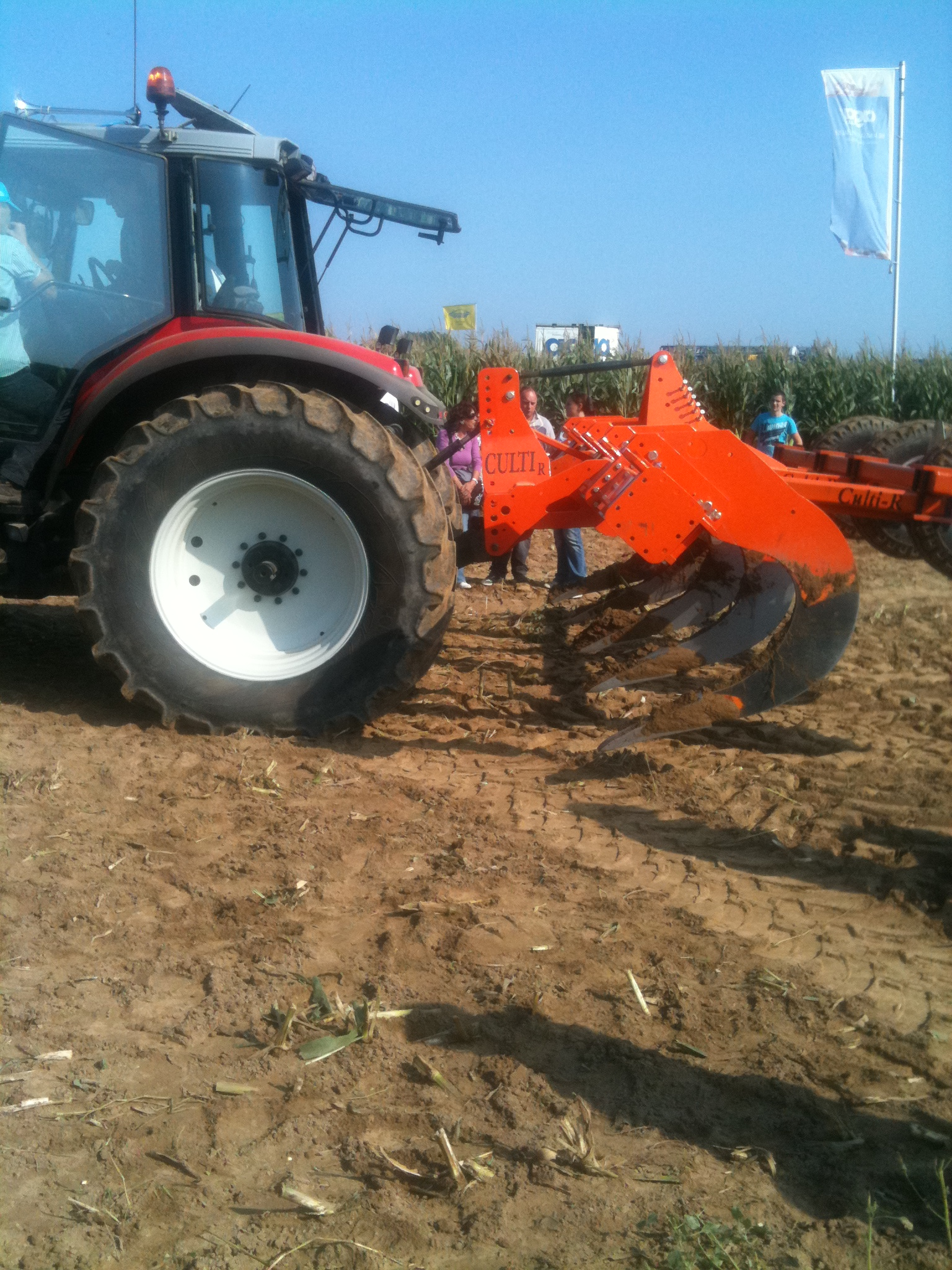
Mounted subsoiler

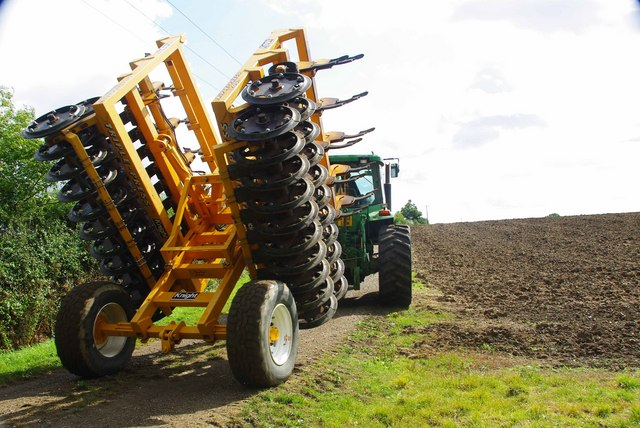
Trailed subsoiler

== Construction, Operation, and Characteristics ==
The subsoiler consists of three or more heavy vertical shanks (standards) mounted on a toolbar or frame with shear bolts. They can be operated at depths of 45–75 cm (18–30 in) or more. A ripper normally runs 35–45 cm (14–18 in) deep. Shanks are curved and have replaceable tips. Each shank is fitted with a replaceable point or foot, similar to a chisel plough, to break through the impervious layer, shattering the sub-soil to a depth of 45–75 cm (18–30 in). Subsoiling is a slow operation and requires high power input: 60 to 100 horsepower (45 to 75 kW) to pull a single subsoil point through a hard soil. Typically, a subsoiler mounted on a compact utility tractor will reach depths of about 30 cm (12 in) and have only one thin blade with a sharpened tip. The shanks should be inclined to the vertical at an angle greater than 25-30 degrees, preferably 45 degrees, and it is advisable that the height be adjustable. The points of the shanks are normally about 30 cm (12 in) wide and should be easy to replace. The condition of the points is very important: often the subsoiler fails to give good results due to the condition of its points. Points can be fitted with horizontal wings, about 30 cm (12 in) wide, which considerably increases the width of soil below ploughing depth loosened by the subsoiler. The subsoilers are raised and lowered hydraulically. Some models feature power-take-off (PTO)-driven vibrating devices. The typical spacing is 76–100 cm (30–39 in) between shanks. Shanks should be able to reach 2.5–5 cm (1–2 in) below the deepest compacted layer. Shank spacing and height should be adjustable in the field. Towed subsoilers should have gauge wheels to control the shank's depth. Shanks usually are from 2–4 cm (0.8–1.6 in) thick. Thinner shanks are suited for agricultural use. Thicker shanks hold up better in rocky conditions, but require larger, more powerful equipment to pull them and disturb the surface more. Agricultural subsoiler implements will have multiple deeper-reaching blades; each blade is called a scarifier or shank. Purdue University's Department of Agriculture indicates that common subsoilers for agricultural use are available with three, five or seven shanks. Subsoilers can be up to 15 feet (4.6 m) wide.

== See also ==
- Plough – Chisel plough
- Bulldozer ripper
- List of agricultural machinery
