= 177th Airlift Squadron =

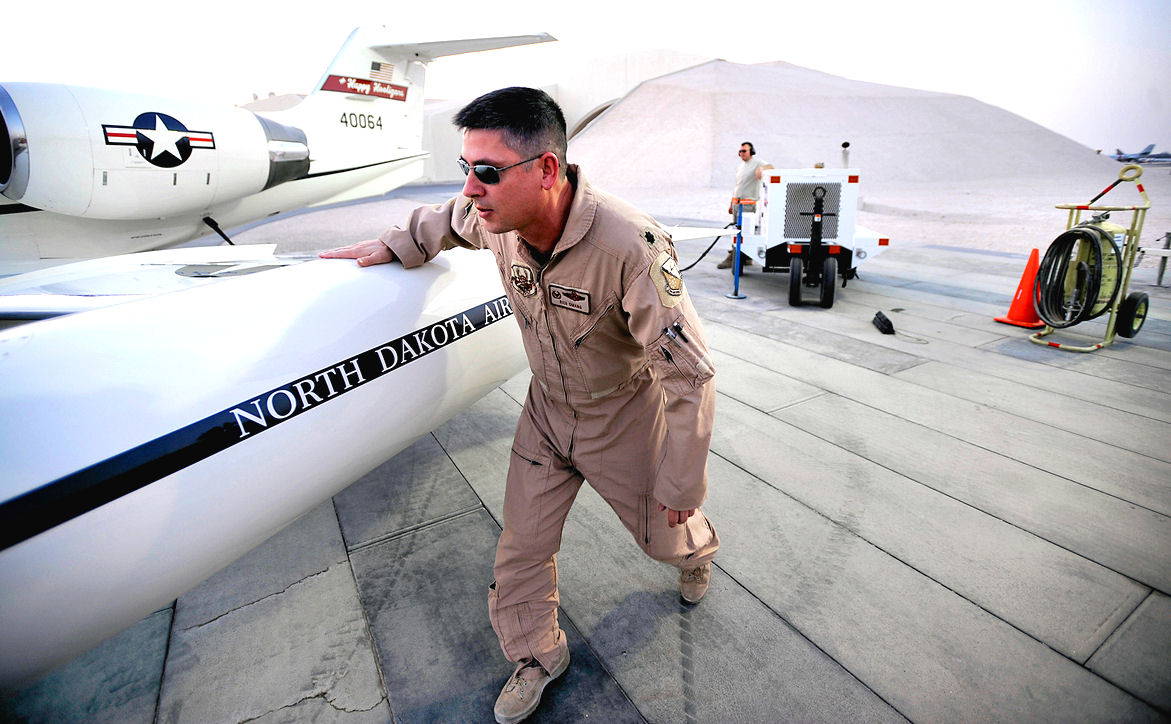
- 177th Airlift Squadron C-21 Learjet in Iraq, 2009
- Active: 2008 – unknown
- Country: United States
- Allegiance: North Dakota
- Branch: Air National Guard
- Type: Squadron
- Role: Airlift
- Part of: North Dakota Air National Guard
- Garrison/HQ: Fargo Air National Guard Base, North Dakota.

Insignia
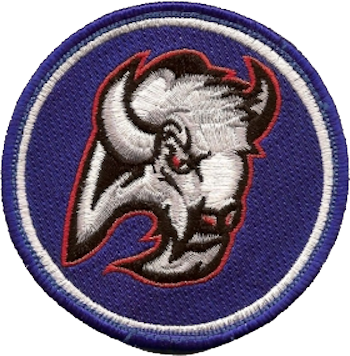
- 177th Airlift Squadron emblem
- Tail Code: Red tail stripe, "Happy Hooligans" in white letters

The 177th Airlift Squadron was a unit of the 119th Wing of the North Dakota Air National Guard, stationed at Fargo Air National Guard Base, North Dakota. The 177th was equipped with the C-21A Learjet.

== Overview ==
The 177th Airlift Squadron accomplishes several missions including operational support airlift, transportation of distinguished visitors, and a responsive aeromedical airlift system to move eligible patients.

== History ==
The squadron was authorized in 2008 and activated at Fargo Air National Guard Base when the 178th Airlift Squadron of the 119th Airlift Wing was equipped with General Atomics MQ-1 Predator unmanned aerial vehicles. The 178th was redesignated the 178th Reconnaissance Squadron and the C-21A Learjets it formerly operated were transferred to the new 177th Airlift Squadron. Support equipment and personnel from the 178th were also reassigned to the 177th.

In 2009, the 177th deployed to Iraq in support of Operation Iraqi Freedom. It was the first deployment into a combat zone for a unit of the North Dakota Air National Guard. The squadron transported more than 400 service members during their two-month-long rotation in theater. They accomplished this by flying more than 200 sorties during 90 missions as part of the 379th Expeditionary Operations Group.

The unit's last C-121 departed in August 2013. The 119th Wing had not transitioned to the C-27 Spartan as planned, and its flying mission had come to an end.

== Lineage ==
- Designated as the 177th Airlift Squadron and allotted to the Air National Guard

Extended federal recognition and activated on 1 March 2008

=== Assignments ===
- 119th Operations Group, 1 March 2008 – unknown

=== Stations ===
- Fargo Air National Guard Base, North Dakota, 1 March 2008 – present

=== Aircraft ===
- C-21A Learjet, 2008–2013
