= Pappy (nickname) =

Pappy is the nickname of:

- Pappy Boyington (1912–1988), American combat pilot who was a United States Marine Corps fighter ace during World War II
- Fred Coe (1914–1979), American television producer and director
- Pappy Daily (1902–1987), American country music record producer and entrepreneur
- Paul Gunn (1899–1957), United States naval aviator known mainly for his actions in the Second World War
- John C. Herbst (1909–1946), American flying ace who was officially the second highest-scoring fighter pilot in the China Burma India Theater
- J.C. Hoel (1904–1989), motorcycle racer, dealer, businessman, and founder of Sturgis Motorcycle Rally
- Pappy Kojo (born 989), Ghanaian hip hop and hiplife recording artist from Takoradi
- Duane S. Larson (1916–2005), American World War II fighter pilot
- Art Lewis (1911–1962), American football player and coach
- Howard Mason (born 1959), American drug trafficker and organized crime figure
- W. Lee O'Daniel (1890–1969), conservative Democratic politician from Texas
- James “Pappy” Ricks (1927–2011), American basketball player for the New York Rens
- Paul Rowe (Canadian football) (1917–1990), Canadian professional football fullback
- Pappy Sherrill (born 1915), American Old Time and Bluegrass fiddler
- Pappy Stokes (1920–2006), professional golf caddie at the Augusta National Golf Club
- Risley C. Triche (1927–2012), attorney in Napoleonville, Louisiana, who served as a Democratic member of the Louisiana House of Representatives from 1955 to 1976
- Pappy Waldorf (1902–1981), American college football player and coach
- Pappy Wood (1888–1978), Canadian curler, and ice hockey, lacrosse and soccer player
