= Duane S. Larson =

American recipient of the Distinguished Flying Cross

- Born: October 27, 1916; Regent, North Dakota, United States
- Died: September 20, 2005 (aged 88); Fargo, North Dakota
- Military career
- Allegiance: United States
- Branch: United States Air Force
- Service years: 1941–1945; 1951–1969
- Rank: Brigadier General
- Nickname: Pappy
- Other work: pilot, flight instructor

Duane S. "Pappy" Larson (October 27, 1916 – September 20, 2005) was a brigadier general in the North Dakota Air National Guard. He served as a fighter pilot in the United States Army Air Forces during World War II and commanded the 178th Fighter-Interceptor Squadron of the North Dakota Air National Guard in the 1950s. He is considered the “original” Happy Hooligan which was the moniker of 178th.

== Biography ==
=== Early life ===
Pappy Duane Larson was born in Regent, North Dakota and graduated from Regent High School. Larson joined the U.S. Army Air Corps in 1941. Originally he was assigned a truck driver position. After passing the suitability test he entered the Army Air Corps pilot program and did his flight training in Selma, Alabama and P51 training at Rice, California.

=== World War II ===
As a P-51 Mustang fighter pilot and flight commander, Larson flew 68 combat missions in the European Theater during World War II with the 8th Air Force. Flying out of England as part of the 504th Fighter Squadron of the 339th Fighter Group, he escorted B-17 bombers to Berlin, providing cover against German fighters. His nickname was "Swede" during World War II and he earned six Air Medals and the Distinguished Flying Cross.

=== Post-war military activities ===
Between 1947 and 1950, Larson helped introduce aerial crop spraying to North Dakota, ran a local airport in Mott, North Dakota and barnstormed local events, county fairs and air shows, while simultaneously participating with the Air Force Reserve Command.

In 1951, Larson joined the North Dakota Air National Guard and served as the 178th Fighter Interceptor Squadron Commander. He flew the B-25, C-45, C-47, T-6, F-51, T-33, F-94 and F-89 for the North Dakota Air National Guard and was the squadron commander during the Cuban Missile Crisis when the 178th was activated to regular duty. Larson was the first Air National Guard pilot to score a direct air-to-air hit on a drone. Larson rose to the rank of brigadier general by the time he retired from the Air National Guard in 1969 as Commander of the 119th Wing.

=== Legacy ===
There was a cartoon during the 1950s called Pappy Easter and his Happy Hooligans and the 178th Fighter Squadron began calling themselves the “Happy Hooligans” and Larson, as their commander, became “Pappy” as the senior pilot. It became Pappy Larson and his Happy Hooligans and this nickname has been adopted by the entire unit and still exists. In recognition of his contributions to aviation in North Dakota, Larson was among the ten inaugural inductees into the North Dakota Aviation Hall of Fame in March 1997.
