= 178th Attack Squadron =

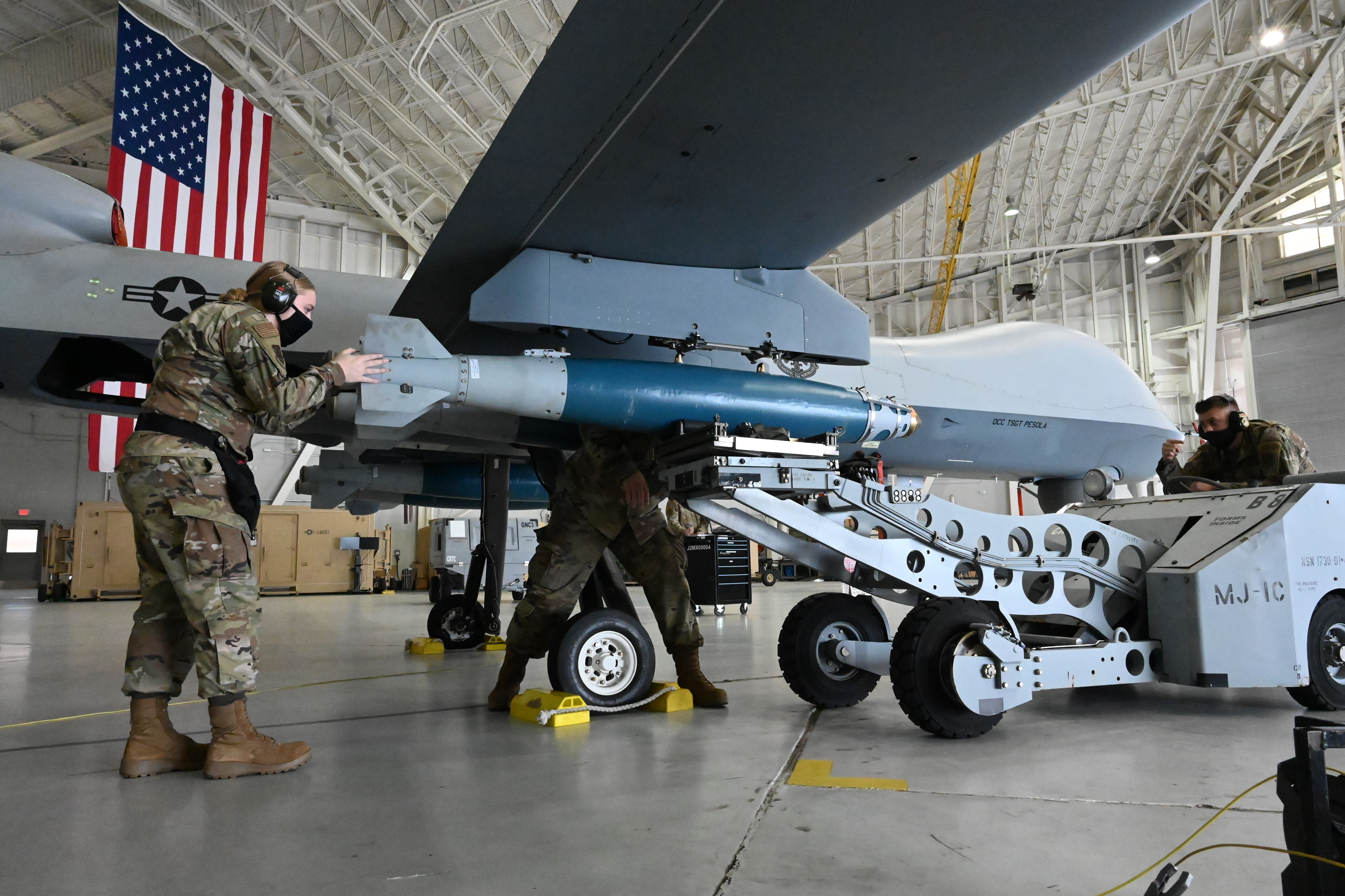
- 178th Attack Squadron MQ-9 Reaper
- Active: 1943–1945; 1947–1953; 1953–present
- Country: United States
- Branch: Air National Guard
- Type: Squadron
- Role: UAV air support
- Part of: North Dakota Air National Guard
- Base: Fargo Air National Guard Base, North Dakota.
- Nickname: Happy Hooligans
- Engagements: European Theater of Operations

Insignia
- 178th Reconnaissance Squadron emblem (Note: Designation for unit on scroll for previous designation, but emblem is unchanged.)

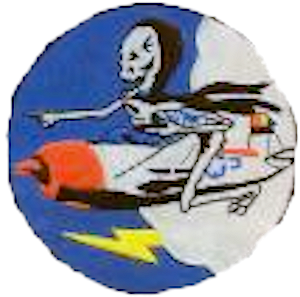
- 392d Fighter Squadron emblem (unofficial)

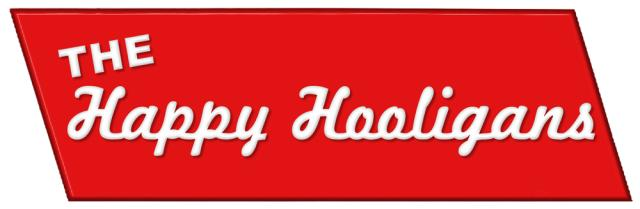
- Tail stripe

The 178th Attack Squadron is a unit of the North Dakota Air National Guard 119th Wing located at Fargo Air National Guard Base, North Dakota. The 178th is equipped with the MQ-9 Reaper. The squadron operates General Atomics MQ-9 Reaper, a medium-altitude, long-endurance, remotely piloted aircraft. The MQ-9's primary mission is interdiction and conducting armed reconnaissance against critical, perishable targets. When the MQ-9 is not actively pursuing its primary mission, it acts as a Joint Forces Air Component Commander-owned theater asset for reconnaissance, surveillance and target acquisition in support of the Joint Forces commander.

== History ==
=== World War II ===
==== Training in the United States ====
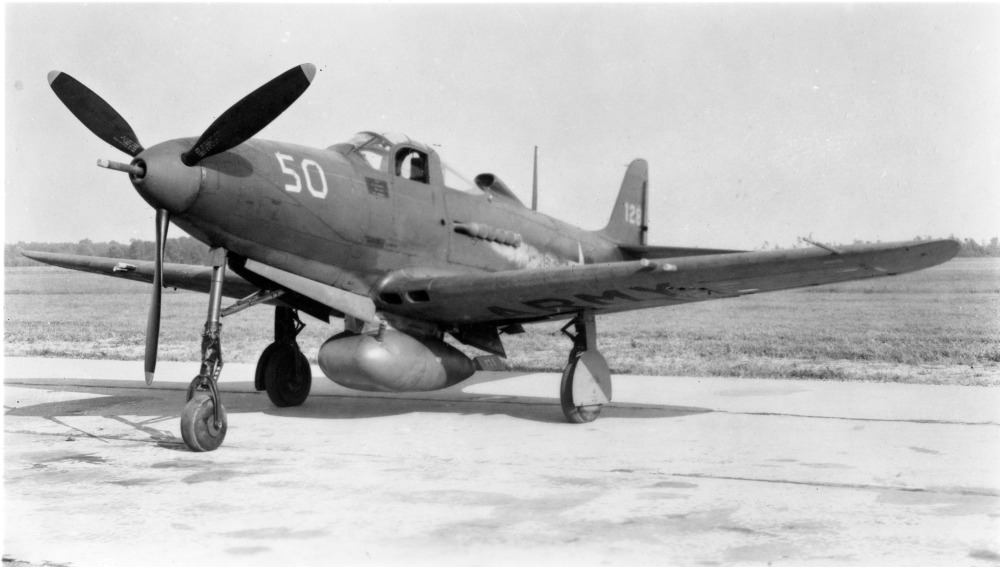
P-39D as used by the group for training

The squadron was first organized as the 392d Fighter Squadron at Hamilton Field, California on 15 July 1943, as one of the original squadrons of the 367th Fighter Group. Several members of its initial cadre were former Flying Tigers with prior combat experience. It was not until late August, however, that the group received its first Bell P-39 Airacobra. After building up its strength, the squadron moved in October to Santa Rosa Army Air Field, California. In December group headquarters moved to Oakland Municipal Airport, while the 392d was at Sacramento Municipal Airport. The squadron moved temporarily Tonopah Army Air Field, Nevada, where they performed dive bombing and gunnery training. Training accidents with the Bell P-39 Airacobra cost several pilots their lives. In January 1944, as it prepared for overseas movement, the 392d was beefed up with personnel from the 328th and 368th Fighter Groups. The squadron staged through Camp Shanks, and sailed for England aboard the SS Duchess of Bedford. The "Drunken Duchess" (Note: Nicknamed for its unusual rolling motion in heavy weather. Groh, p. 23.) docked at Greenock, Scotland on 3 April and the group was transported by train to its airfield at RAF Stoney Cross, England.

==== P-38 transition and combat operations from England ====
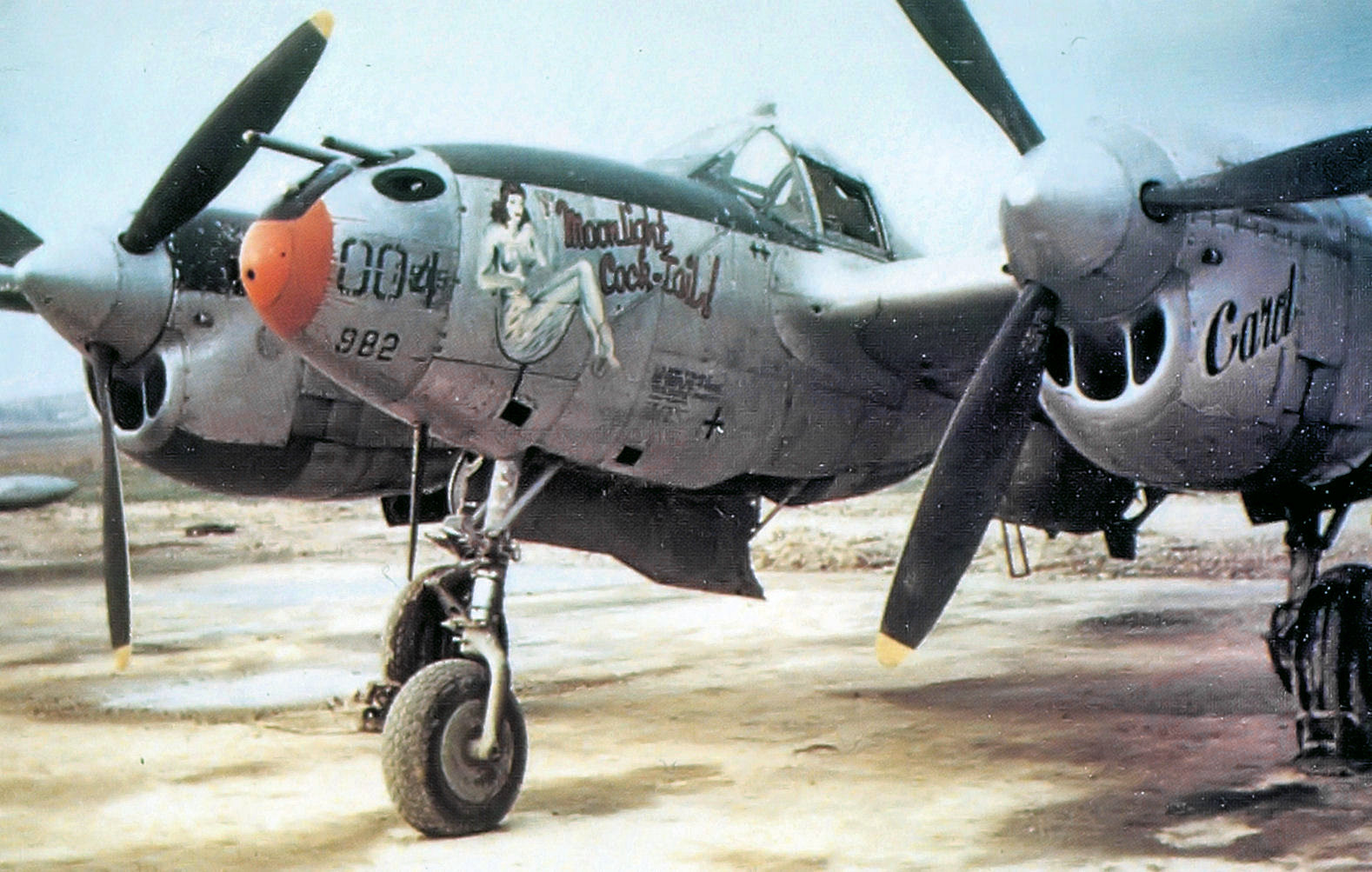
392d Fighter Squadron P-38 (Note: Aircraft is Lockheed P-38G-10-LO Lightning, serial 42-12982.)

Having trained on single engine aircraft, the squadron's pilots were surprised to find Lockheed P-38 Lightnings sitting on Stoney Cross's dispersal pads. Only members of the advance party had any experience flying the Lightning. These pilots had flown combat sorties with the 55th Fighter Group. The change from single engine to twin engine aircraft required considerable retraining for both pilots and ground crew. Although some pilots entered combat with as little as eight hours of flying time on the P-38, in late April the squadron was reinforced by pilots who had trained on the Lightning in the States and were more experienced on the type. However, the lack of instrument training in the P-38 took its toll on the 392d as weather, not enemy action, caused the loss of pilots and airplanes.

On 9 May, the squadron flew its first combat mission, a fighter sweep over Alençon. For the remainer of the month, the unit flew fighter sweeps, bomber escort and dive bombing, missions and suffered its first combat losses.

On D-Day and the next three days the squadron flew missions maintaining air cover over shipping carrying invasion troops. These missions continued for the next three days. The 392d and other P-38 units stationed in England were selected for these missions with the expectation that the distinctive silhouette of the Lightning would prevent potential friendly fire incidents by anti-aircraft gunners mistaking them for enemy fighters. Shortly after the Normandy invasion, on 12 June, the 367th Group was selected to test the ability of the P-38 to carry a 2,000 lb bomb under each wing. The selected target was a railroad yard, and results were mixed.

By mid June German ground forces had withdrawn to defend a perimeter around Cherbourg Harbour, a major port whose capture had become more important to the allies with the destruction of Mulberry A, one of the artificial harbors constructed near the Normandy beachhead. An attack by VII Corps on 22 June was to be preceded by low level bombing and strafing attack by IX Fighter Command. Briefed by intelligence to expect a "milk run" The 394th flew at low altitude through what turned out to be a heavily defended area. Seven group pilots were killed in action. Nearly all surviving aircraft received battle damage and the entire 367th Group was out of action for several days.

Ninth Air Force moved its medium bomber forces to bases closer to the Continent in July, so they would be able to strike targets near the expanding front in France. The 387th Bombardment Group was moved to Stoney Cross, forcing the 392d to vacate their station and move the short distance to RAF Ibsley. From Ibsley the group struck railroads, marshaling yards, and trains to prevent enemy reinforcements from reaching the front during the Allied breakthrough at Saint Lo in July 1944.

==== Operations on the European Continent ====
Starting on 19 July, the 367th Group's forward echelon crossed the English Channel to take up stations in Normandy. Group headquarters shared Beuzeville Airfield with the 371st Fighter Group, while the 392d Squadron was at Carentan Airfield, advanced landing grounds made from pierced steel planking. After the breakout of ground forces in the Saint-Lô area, the squadron concentrated on close air support of General Patton's Third Army. In late August, the squadron attacked German Seventh Army convoys which, to prevent being surrounded, were withdrawing eastward from the Falaise pocket. Five convoys and 100 Tiger Tanks were destroyed on one day.

On 22 August the group attacked three Luftwaffe airfields near Laon. The squadron dive bombed and destroyed two hangars on one airfield but were jumped by twelve Focke-Wulf Fw 190s as they completed their attack. Eighteen Messerschmitt Bf 109s and Fw 190s engaged the 393d Fighter Squadron as it reformed from its dive bomb run. After bombing its target, the 394th Fighter Squadron turned to reinforce the 392d. The squadrons of the 367th Group claimed fourteen enemy aircraft in total against a loss of one Lightning.

The 392d received a Distinguished Unit Citation when it returned to the Laon area three days later. That day, the 367th Group attacked Luftwaffe airfields at Clastres, Péronne and Rosières-en-Haye through an intense flak barrage. The group then engaged more than thirty Focke-Wulf 190 fighters that had just taken off. Group claims were 25 enemy aircraft destroyed, one probably destroyed and 17 damaged against the loss of 6 group aircraft. (Note: These claims were from an estimated 50 enemy aircraft engaged in the air and on the ground. Chickering, p. 79.) Then, despite a low fuel supply, the unit strafed a train and convoy after leaving the scene of battle. In the afternoon the squadron conducted a long range fighter sweep of more than 800 miles to airfields in the Dijon-Bordeaux area.

As Allied forces moved forward across France the squadron began leap-frogging to new bases. In early September they relocated at Peray Airfield, but moved again a week later to Clastres Airfield. From Clastres The 392d supported Operation Market-Garden by escorting troop carrier aircraft and attacking flak positions. For its attacks that fall, the squadron was cited in the Order of the Day by the Belgium Army.

In late October, as Ninth Air Force brought its medium bombers to bases in France, the 392d was bumped from its station for the second time by the 387th Bombardment Group, when it moved to Juvincourt Airfield (A-68), north of Reims. Juvincourt was a former Luftwaffe base with permanent facilities, in contrast to the advanced landing grounds where the squadron had been based since moving to France. The squadron attacked German strong points to aid the Allied push against the Siegfried Line throughout the fall of 1944.

The German Ardennes Offensive occurred as the holidays approached. A planned move to a field in Belgium was canceled. During the Battle of the Bulge, the 392d, after escorting C-47s on a resupply drop to encircled troops at Bastogne, conducted an armed reconnaissance of the Trier area.

==== Transition to the P-47 Thunderbolt ====
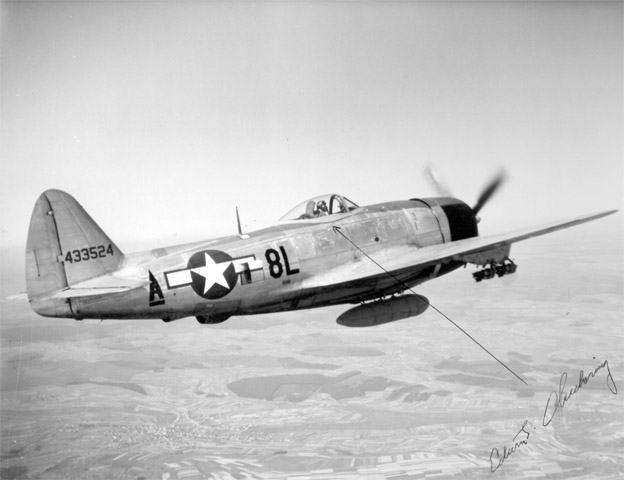
367th Fighter Group commander's P-47D

Early in 1945 a desire to standardize the fighter-bombers in Ninth Air Force, the group transitioned into Republic P-47 Thunderbolts. Pilots flew Lightnings on combat missions while training at the same time with the Thunderbolt. Using the Thunderbolt the group was again cited in a Belgium Army Order of the Day, earning the Belgian Fourragere.

The 392d received a second Distinguished Unit Citation for action on 19 March 1945. The 367th Group's target was the headquarters of Field Marshal Kesselring, the German Commander-ln-Chief, West, (Note: Kesselring assumed command the day of the attack. American intelligence believed Field Marshall von Rundstedt was still in command. Groh, p. 136.) at Ziegenburg near Bad Nauheim, Germany. Aircraft of the leading 394th Fighter Squadron would attack at low level to achieve surprise, carrying a 1,000-pound bomb under each wing. The P-47s of the 392d would be similarly armed, but would dive bomb from a higher altitude. The bombs were equipped with time-delay fuses intended to crack the concrete roofs of the bunker. The 393d Fighter Squadron carried napalm intended to seep into the bunkers and burn what remained. The attack was scheduled for a time that intelligence reports indicated would find senior staff and commanders at lunch, the only time they would not be in the reinforced tunnels underneath the castle that housed the headquarters. The target was located in mountainous terrain well defended by antiaircraft artillery. Moreover, to avoid alerting the Germans to the pending attack, photographic reconnaissance aircraft had avoided the area, so detailed target photography was not available. The day of the attack the castle was concealed by ground haze which caused the 394th Fighter Squadron to stray off course at the last minute, preventing them from executing the attack as planned and reducing the element of surprise. Although senior German officers reached the underground bunkers and survived the attack, the group reduced the military complex to ruins, disrupting communications and the flow of intelligence at a critical time.

The squadron struck tanks, trucks, flak positions, and other objectives in support of the assault across the Rhine late in March and the final allied operations in Germany. It was commended by the commanding generals of XII Corps and the 11th Armored Division for the close air support the unit provided for their commands. On 10 April the squadron moved to Eschborn Airfield on the northwest side of Frankfurt, Germany. The 392d flew its last combat mission, a defensive patrol, one year after entering combat on 8 May. During its combat tour, the squadron was credited with 39.5 air-to-air victories over enemy aircraft, the most of any of the squadrons in the group.

==== Return to the United States and inactivation ====
All hostilities ceased the following day, exactly one year after the squadron became operational. On 4 June, the 367th Group led a flyby for General Weyland. On 1 July it was announced the 392d was to redeploy to the Pacific Theater of Operations after it was re-equipped with and trained with long range P-47Ns in preparation for Operation Downfall, the invasion of Japan. The squadron moved to Camp Detroit in France then to a staging area near Marseille. Here it boarded two ships, the USS General C. G. Morton, and the USNS John Ericsson (T-AO-194). When Japan surrendered, the Morton was diverted to Newport News, Virginia while the Ericcson sailed for Staten Island, New York. Following leave for everyone, the few personnel that remained in the squadron after transfers and discharges reassembled at Seymour Johnson Field, North Carolina on 2 November, and the 394th was inactivated there on 7 November 1945.

=== North Dakota Air National Guard ===
The wartime 392d Fighter Squadron was redesignated as the 178th Fighter Squadron and allotted to the National Guard on 24 May 1946. It was organized at Hector Field near Fargo, North Dakota and was extended federal recognition on 16 January 1947. The squadron was equipped with North American P-51D Mustangs trained in air defense.

There was a cartoon during the 1950s called Pappy Easter and his Happy Hooligans and the 178th Fighter Squadron began calling themselves the “Happy Hooligans” and Duane S. Larson, as their commander, became “Pappy”. It became Pappy Larson and his Happy Hooligans and this nickname has been adopted by the entire unit and still exists. In recognition of his contributions to aviation in North Dakota, Larson was among the ten inaugural inductees into the North Dakota Aviation Hall of Fame in March 1997.

==== Korean War activation ====
On 1 March 1951 the 178th was federalized and brought on active duty due to the Korean War. It moved to Moody Air Force Base, Georgia, where it became part of Strategic Air Command (SAC), and was assigned to the federalized 146th Fighter-Bomber Group. The 146th Group was composed of the 178th, the 186th Fighter-Bomber Squadron and the 190th Fighter-Bomber Squadron.

The unit remained a Moody until October when it moved to George Air Force Base, California, where it became part of Tactical Air Command (TAC) in November. It trained with its Mustangs as a tactical unit and augmented the air defenses of the United States. The 178th Fighter-Bomber Squadron was released from active duty and returned on paper to North Dakota state control on 1 January 1953. Its personnel and equipment at George were transferred to the 72d Fighter-Bomber Squadron, which was simultaneously activated.

==== Air Defense ====
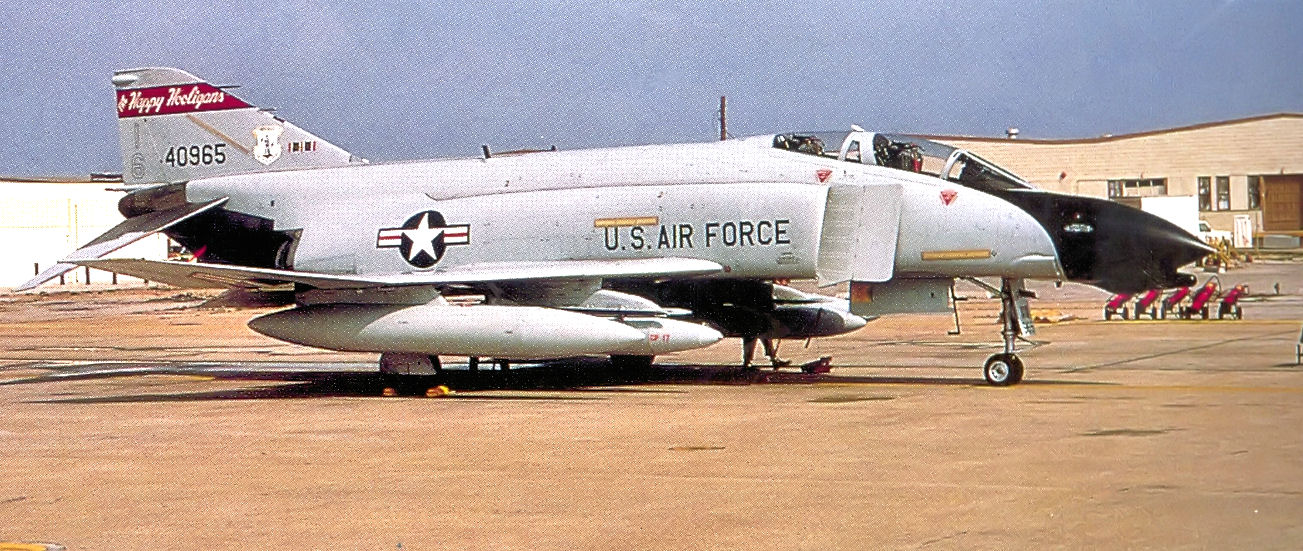
178th Fighter-Interceptor Squadron F-4D Phantom (Note: Aircraft is McDonnell F-4D-26-MC Phantom serial 64-965, taken in 1979. The aircraft is painted in Air Defense Tactical Air Command gray.)

The squadron was redesignated the 178th Fighter-Interceptor Squadron and reactivated at Fargo the same day. In September 1953 the squadron began to keep two F-51D Mustangs on alert status 14 hours a day. The squadron continued to maintain this alert in various forms for over 50 years until it lost its fighter mission in the summer of 2007. On 1 November 1954, the 192d began the transition from the piston-engine, propeller driven F-51D to its first jet aircraft, the Lockheed F-94A Starfire interceptor. The Starfire was armed with 20 millimeter cannon and was equipped with radar.

On 15 April 1956, the 178th was authorized to expand to a group level, and the 119th Fighter Group (Air Defense) was established to command the squadron and its associated support units. The 178th became the new group's flying squadron. Other units assigned into the group were the 119th Material Squadron, 119th Air Base Squadron and the 119th USAF Dispensary.

The "Happy Hooligan" pilots upgraded to the Northrop F-89 Scorpion in 1958. Its first Scorpions were F-89Ds, armed with Mighty Mouse rockets, but a year later the squadron began to receive the F-89J, which could carry the nuclear armed MB-1 Genie (later AIR-2). The Scorpion was also equipped with data link for interception control through the Semi-Automatic Ground Environment system. The 178th was one of the last units to fly the F-89, only replacing then in 1966 when it received the supersonic Convair F-102A Delta Dagger interceptor, armed with AIM-4 Falcons. It replaced its "Deuces" in 1969 with McDonnell F-101B Voodoo interceptors. In 1977, it began to fly McDonnell F-4 Phantom IIs, and two years later, its mobilization gaining command changed to TAC, when ADC was inactivated and replaced by Air Defense Tactical Air Command.

The unit's first overseas deployment occurred in 1983, when six Phantoms and 120 support personnel deployed to Naval Air Station Keflavik, Iceland. Eight Soviet Tupolev Tu-95 Bear bombers were intercepted by Hooligan pilots during the deployment. In 1986, the 119th Fighter Group became the first Guard unit to assume the USAF Zulu alert mission at Ramstein Air Base, West Germany in Operation Creek Klaxon. The 119th and other air defense units rotated to Ramstein and stood continuous alert for one year, to provide air sovereignty in Western Europe for the North Atlantic Treaty Organization. During Operation Desert Storm in 1991, 107 Happy Hooligans were mobilized and deployed to support operations at numerous locations within the United States.

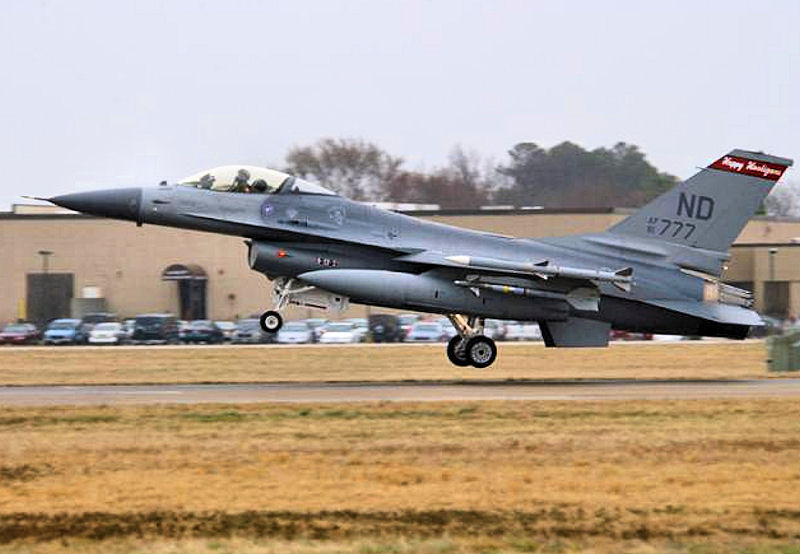
F-16A of the 178th FS takes off on a practice scramble (Note: Aircraft is General Dynamics F-16A Fighting Falcon, serial 81-0777 piloted by Maj. Michael DePree at Langley AFB. The aircraft was retired to the 309th Aerospace Maintenance and Regeneration Group on 5 December 2006. Reported as destined for Jordanian Air Force.)

The 178th FS converted from the F-4 Phantom to the General Dynamics F-16 Fighting Falcon in mid-1990. The first squadron "Vipers" were mostly older Block 5 and 10 models. although some Block 15 aircraft were delivered to the squadron. The main task for the unit remained air defense, as with many Guard units that were equipped with the F-16. In 1991 the F-16s were modified to be brought up to the Air Defense Fighter variant of the plane . This improved the performance and capability of the squadron in their air defense role.

The Hooligans earned first place at the October 1994 William Tell worldwide weapons meet. William Tell tests pilots and ground crews from the Air Force fighter units in air-to-air combat. This was the Hooligans' third William Tell victory, which it added to wins in 1970 and 1972. It also placed first among F-4 units in William Tell 1986. In 1994 the 119th Group won the Hughes Trophy which recognizes the most outstanding air-to-air unit in the Air Force. The only Air National Guard unit to win the award twice, the Hooligans are also the only F-16 unit ever to win the Hughes Trophy.

A permanent alert detachment of the squadron was established at Kingsley Field, Oregon, beginning 1 October 1989. The detachment, staffed by 18 members, was relocated to March Air Force Base, California, on 31 July 1994 when the Oregon Air National Guard took over air defense at Kingsley. An announcement was made in March 1999 that the squadron would convert from an air defense mission to a general purpose mission with 15 F-16A/B aircraft while activating an alert detachment at Langley Air Force Base, Virginia on 1 March 1999. The March and Langley detachments remained in operation as long as the squadron operated the "Viper."

==== Current status ====
The 2005 Base Realignment and Closure Commission recommended that the mission of the North Dakota Air National Guard be realigned. The 119th Fighter Wing's F-16As (15 aircraft) were reaching the end of their operational life and would retire. In Jan 2007, the 119th ended its F-16 mission after almost 60 years of air defense interceptor missions.

Replacing the F-16s in 2007, the squadron began to receive the C-21A Learjet and was redesignated the 178th Airlift Squadron. The C-21 has room for eight passengers and 42 ft^{3} (1.26 m^{3}) of cargo. In addition to its normal role, the aircraft is capable of transporting litters during medical evacuations.

Later in 2007, it was announced that C-21 operations would be transferred to the newly activated 177th Airlift Squadron, and the 179th would convert to operating the MQ-1 Predator and be redesignated the 178th Reconnaissance Squadron. In 2008 it received its first Predator.

== Lineage ==
- Constituted as the 392d Fighter Squadron on 26 May 1943

Activated on 15 July 1943
Inactivated on 7 November 1945

- Redesignated 178th Fighter Squadron and allotted to the National Guard on 24 May 1946

Activated on 9 December 1946
Extended federal recognition on 16 January 1947
Federalized and placed on active duty on 1 April 1951

- Redesignated 178th Fighter-Bomber Squadron on 9 April 1951

Inactivated and released from active duty on 1 January 1953
Redesignated 178th Fighter-Interceptor Squadron, returned to North Dakota state control and activated on 1 January 1953
Redesignated 178th Fighter Squadron on 23 March 1992
Redesignated 178th Airlift Squadron on 1 October 2007
Redesignated 178th Reconnaissance Squadron on 11 March 2008

=== Assignments ===
- 367th Fighter Group, 15 July 1943 – 7 November 1945
- 133d Fighter Group, 16 January 1947
- Tenth Air Force, 1 April 1951
- 146th Fighter Group (later 146th Fighter-Bomber Group), c. 9 April 1951
- 133d Fighter-Interceptor Group, 1 January 1953
- 119th Fighter Group (later 119th Fighter-Interceptor Group, 119th Fighter Group), 15 April 1956
- 119th Operations Group, 1 October 1995 – present

=== Stations ===
- Hamilton Field, California, 15 July 1943
- Santa Rosa Army Airfield, California, 11 October 1943
- Oakland Municipal Airport, California, 10 December 1943 – 8 March 1944
- RAF Stoney Cross (Station 452), England, 5 April 1944
- RAF Ibsley ( Station 347), England, 6 July 1944
- Beuzeville Airfield (A-6), France, 22 July 1944
- Cricqueville Airfield (A-2), France, 14 August 1944
- Peray Airfield (A-44), France, 4 September 1944
- Clastres Airfield (A-71), France, 8 September 1944
- Juvincourt Airfield (A-68), France, 28 October 1944
- St-Dizier Airfield (A-64), France, 1 February 1945
- Conflans Airfield (A-94), France, 14 March 1945
- Eschborn Airfield (Y-74), Germany, 20 April – July 1945
- Seymour Johnson Field, North Carolina, – 7 September November 1945
- Hector Field, North Dakota, 1 February 1947 – 9 April 1951

Moody Air Force Base, Georgia, 9 April 1951
George Air Force Base, California, 7 August 1951 – 1 January 1953

- Hector Airport (later Hector International Airport, Fargo Air National Guard Base), 1 January 1953 – present

=== Aircraft ===
- Bell P-39 Airacobra, 1943–1944
- Lockheed P-38 Lightning, 1944–1945
- Republic P-47N Thunderbolt, 1945
- F-51D Mustang, 1947–1954
- Lockheed F-94A Starfire, 1954–1958
- Northrop F-89D Scorpion, 1958–1959
- Northrop F-89J Scorpion, 1959–1966
- Convair F-102A Delta Dagger, 1966–1969
- McDonnell F-101B Voodoo, 1969–1977
- McDonnell F-4D Phantom II, 1977–1990
- General Dynamics F-16A Fighting Falcon, 1990–2007
- General Dynamics F-16B Fighting Falcon, 1990–2007
- C-21A Learjet, 2007–2014
- MQ-1B Predator, 2007–2017
- MQ-9 Reaper, 2018–present

=== Operations and decorations ===
- Combat Operations: Combat in ETO, 9 May 1944 – 8 May 1945
- Campaigns: Air Offensive, Europe; Normandy; Northern France; Rhineland; Ardennes-Alsace; Central Europe; Air Combat, EAME Theater.
- Decorations: Distinguished Unit Citations: France, 25 August 1944; Germany, 19 March 1945. Cited in the Order of the Day, Belgian Army: 6 Jun-30 Sep 1944; 16 Dec 1944 – 25 Jan 1945. Belgian Fourragere.
