= Carentan Airfield =

World War II military airfield in France

Carentan Airfield Advanced Landing Ground (ALG) A-10
- Basse-Normandie Region, France
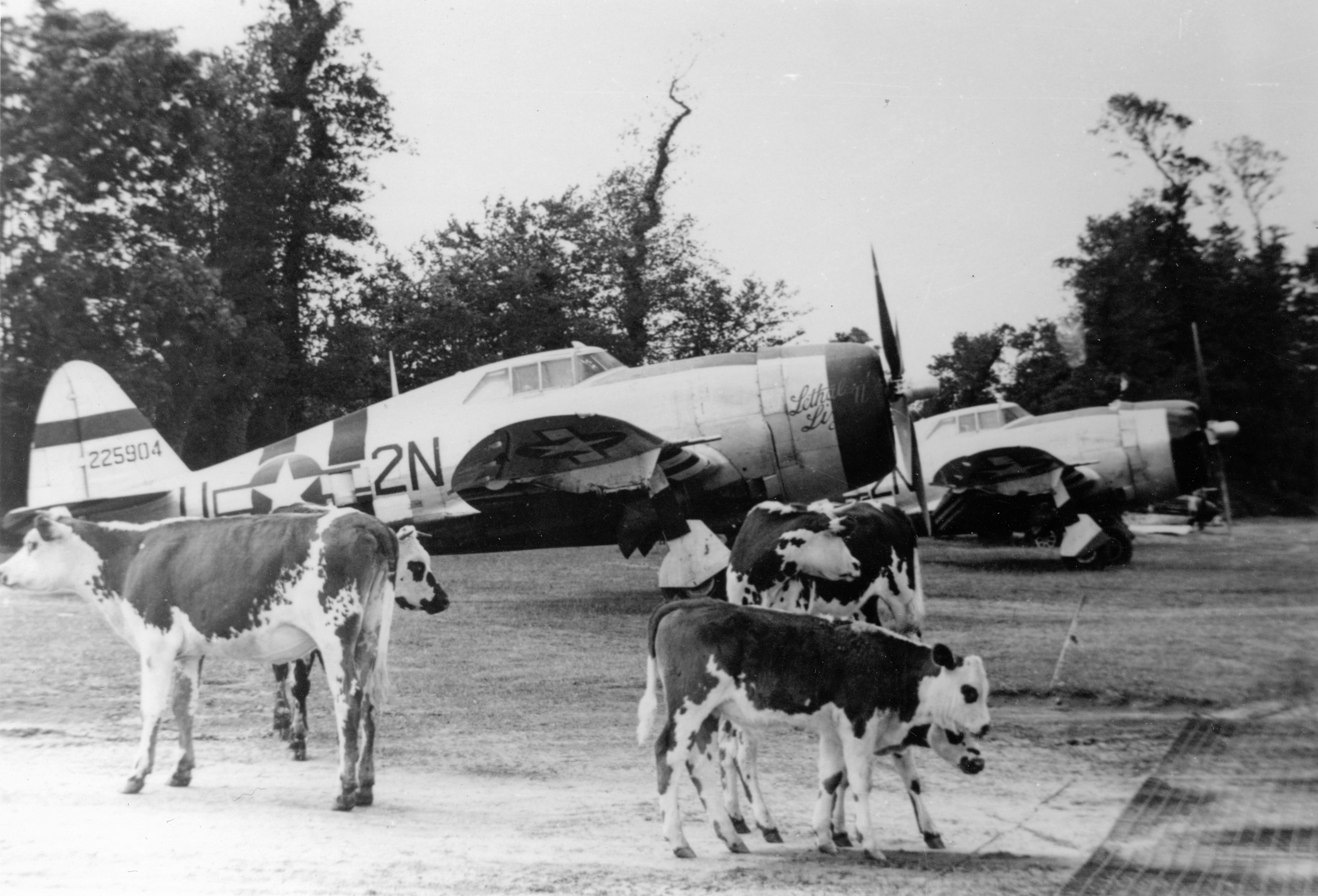
- P-47 Thunderbolts, including (2N-U, serial number 42-25904) nicknamed "Lethal Liz II", of the 50th Fighter Group, with cows at Carentan Airfield (A-10), France, Summer 1944

Site information
- Type: Military Airfield
- Controlled by: United States Army Air Forces

Location
- Coordinates: 49°18′18″N 001°10′46″W

Site history
- Built by: IX Engineering Command
- In use: June–November 1944
- Materials: Prefabricated Hessian Surfacing (PHS)
- Battles/wars: World War II - EAME Theater: Normandy Campaign; Northern France Campaign; Eastern France Campaign

Garrison information
- Garrison: Ninth Air Force
- Occupants: 50th Fighter Group; 392d Fighter Squadron; 367th Fighter Group

Airfield information
Runways
Direction	Length and surface
08/26	5,000 feet (1,520 m) SMT
- One runway, 4 alert pads, 50 hardstands

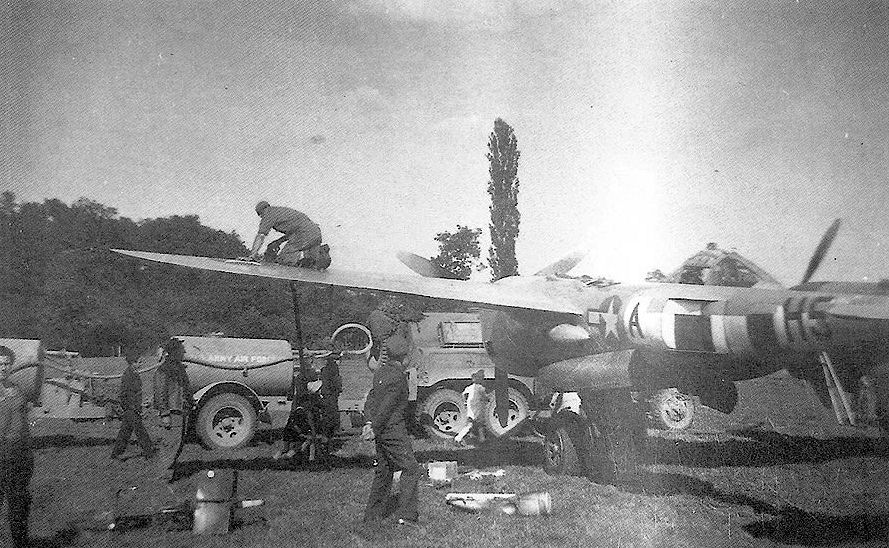
392d Fighter Squadron P-38L at Carentan Airfield (A-10)

Carentan Airfield is an abandoned World War II military airfield, which is located near the commune of Carentan in the Normandy region of northern France.

Located just outside Carentan, the United States Army Air Force established a temporary airfield 15 June 1944, nine days after the first Allied landings in France on D-Day and only three days after the capture of Carentan. The airfield was one of the first established in the liberated area of Normandy, being constructed by the IX Engineering Command, 826th Engineer Aviation Battalion.

== History ==
Known as Advanced Landing Ground "A-10", the airfield consisted of a single 5000' (1500m) Prefabricated Hessian Surfacing runway aligned 08/26.

In addition, tents were erected for billeting and also for support facilities; an access road was built to the existing road infrastructure; a dump was created for supplies, ammunition, and gasoline drums, along with a drinkable water; and a minimal electrical grid for communications and station lighting was installed.

The fighter planes flew support missions during the Allied invasion of Normandy, patrolling roads in front of the beachhead; strafing German military vehicles and dropping bombs on gun emplacements, anti-aircraft artillery and concentrations of German troops when spotted.

After the Americans moved east into Central France with the advancing Allied Armies, the airfield was left un-garrisoned and used for resupply and casualty evacuation. It was closed on 4 November 1944.

== Major units assigned ==
- 50th Fighter Group 20 June - 23 August 1944

10th (TS), 81st (2N), 313th (W3) Fighter Squadrons (P-47)

- 392d Fighter Squadron (H5) 25 June - 16 August 1944 (P-38)

== Current use ==
After its closure by the Americans, the airfield was returned to farmland. Today, the Normandy Victory Museum utilizes part of the original site of the old A10 Airfield of Carentan, first aerodrome re-opened since 1944. It presents the Battle of Normandy known as "the hedgerow hell" and received a P47 2N-U replica.

There is a monument to the A-10 Airfield at the junction of D 974, ex N13 toward Carentan, with D 89, turn left towards Saint Pellerin. The monument is 400 meters left, rue de Banville.

== See also ==
- Advanced Landing Ground
