= 119th Wing =

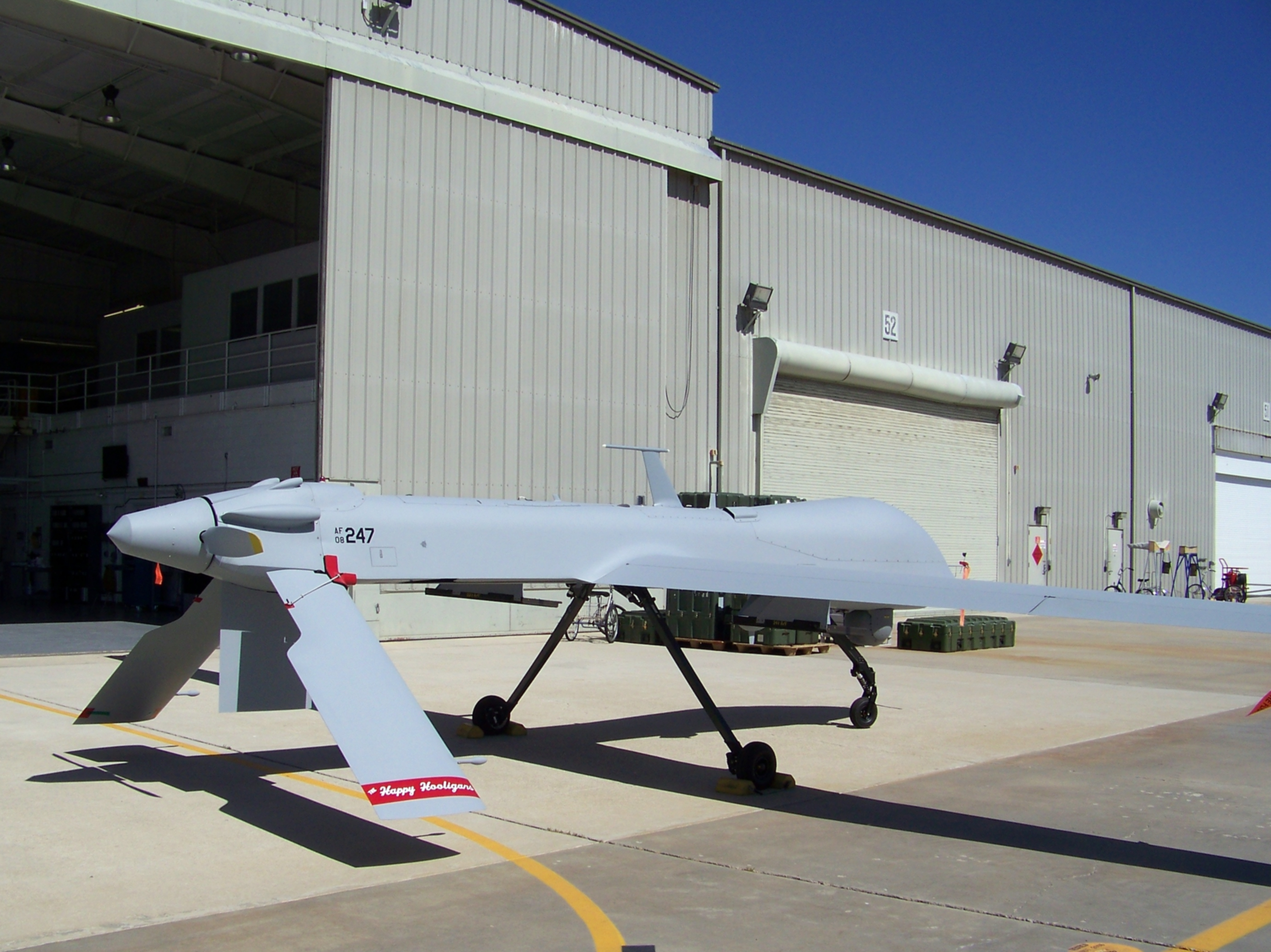
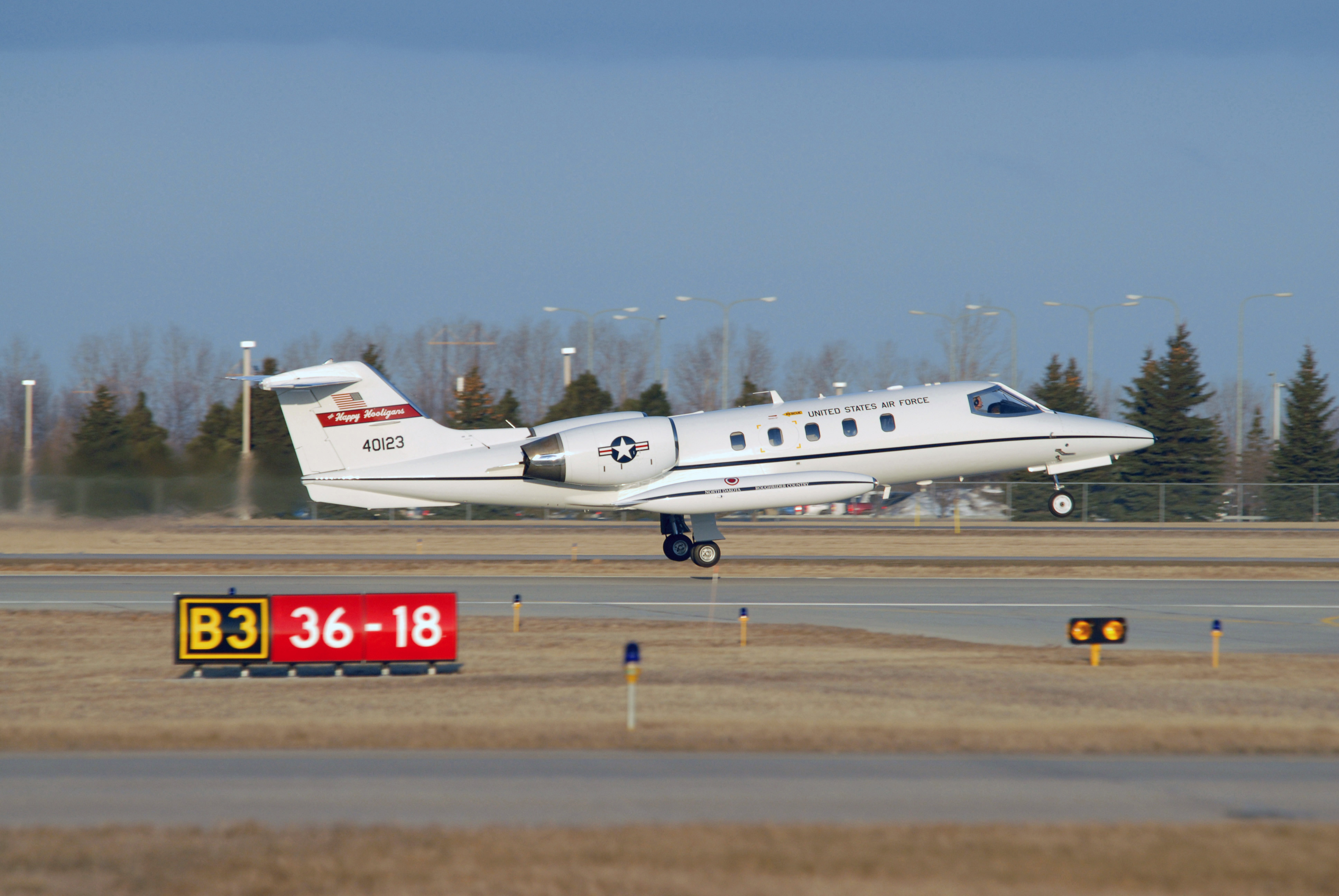
- 178th Reconnaissance Squadron MQ-1B Predator 177th Airlift Squadron C-21A Learjet
- Active: 1956–present
- Country: United States
- Allegiance: North Dakota
- Branch: Air National Guard
- Type: Wing
- Role: Composite (Intelligence, Airlift)
- Part of: North Dakota Air National Guard
- Garrison/HQ: Fargo Air National Guard Base, North Dakota.
- Nickname: "Happy Hooligans"
- Motto: "Guarding the Northland"
- Decorations: Air Force Outstanding Unit Award

Commanders
- Current commander: Colonel Christopher Domitrovich

Insignia
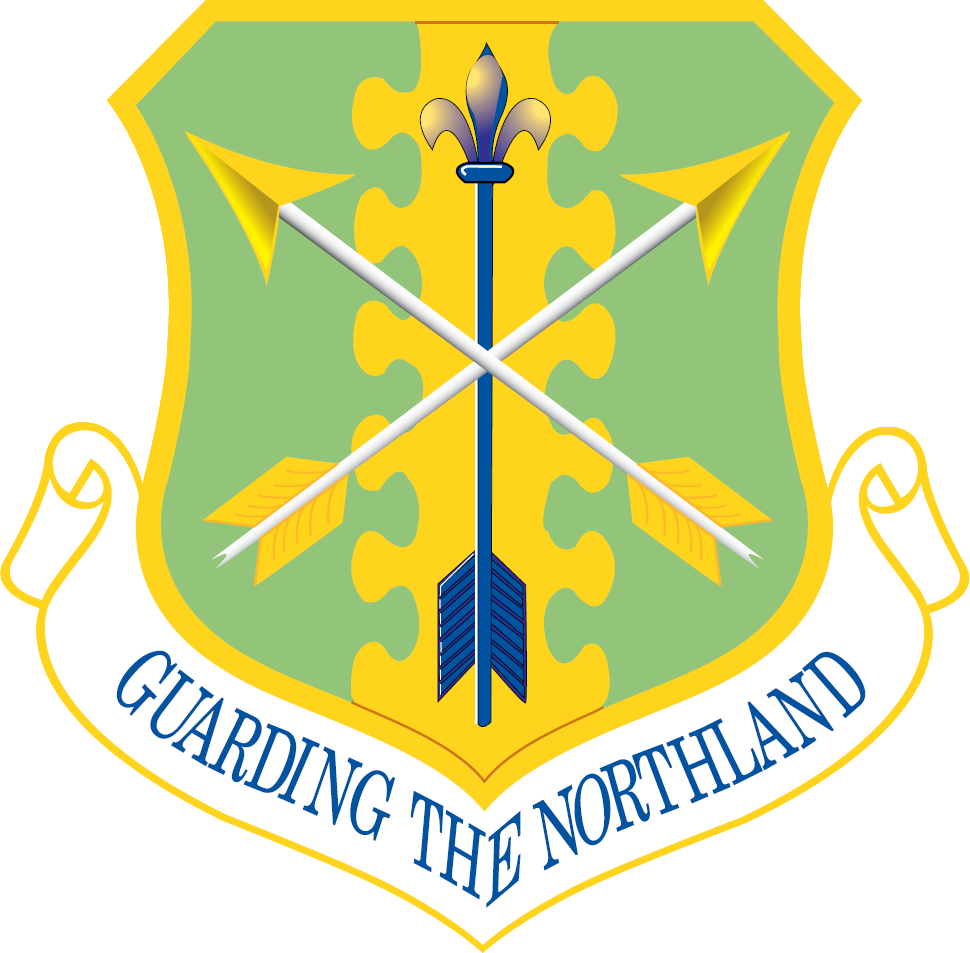
- 119th Wing emblem

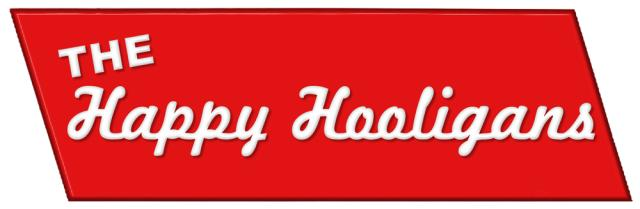
- Tail stripe

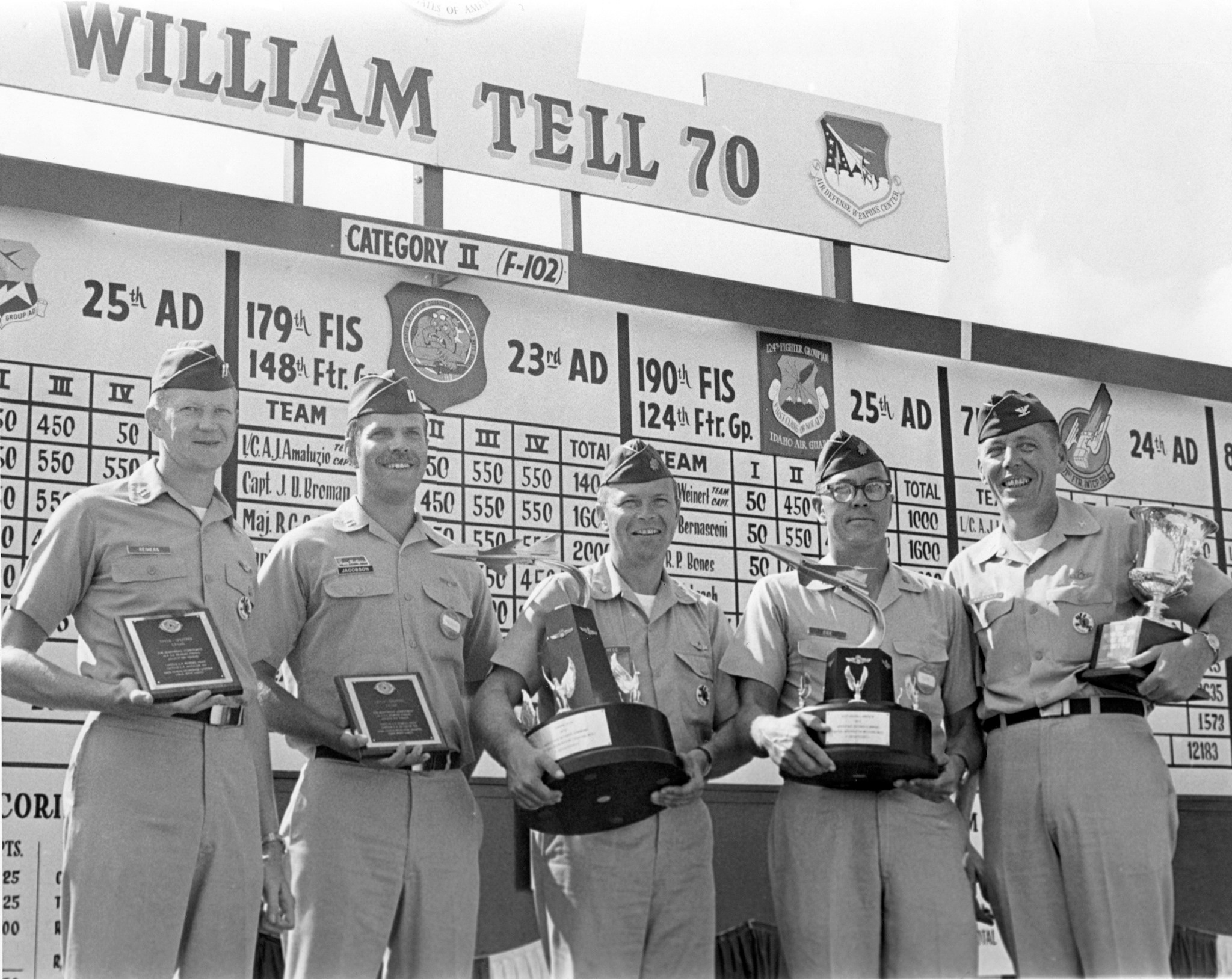

The 119th Wing is a composite unit of the North Dakota Air National Guard, stationed at Fargo Air National Guard Base, North Dakota. If activated to federal service, elements of the Wing are gained by the United States Air Force Air Combat Command.

== Mission ==
The mission of the 119th Wing is both reconnaissance and airlift. The 178th Reconnaissance Squadron includes operations of the MQ-1 Predator. The MQ-1 Predator is a medium-altitude, long-endurance, remotely piloted aircraft.

== Units ==
The 119th Wing is composed of the following units:

- 119th Operations Group

177th Intelligence Squadron
178th Attack Squadron

- 119th Maintenance Group
- 119th Mission Support Group
- 119th Medical Group
- 219th Security Forces Squadron (Minot AFB, ND)

== History ==
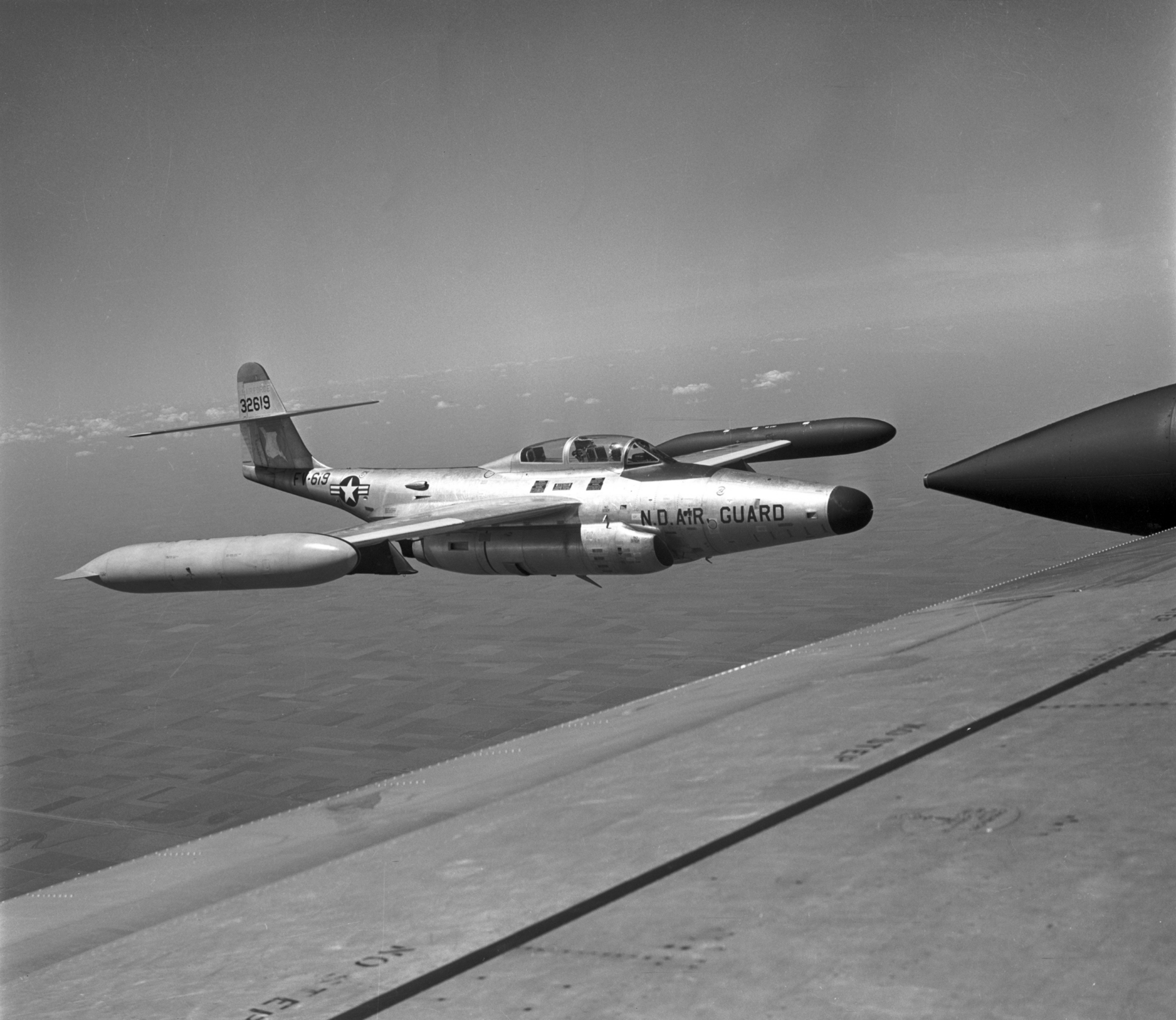
An F-89J in the 1960s.

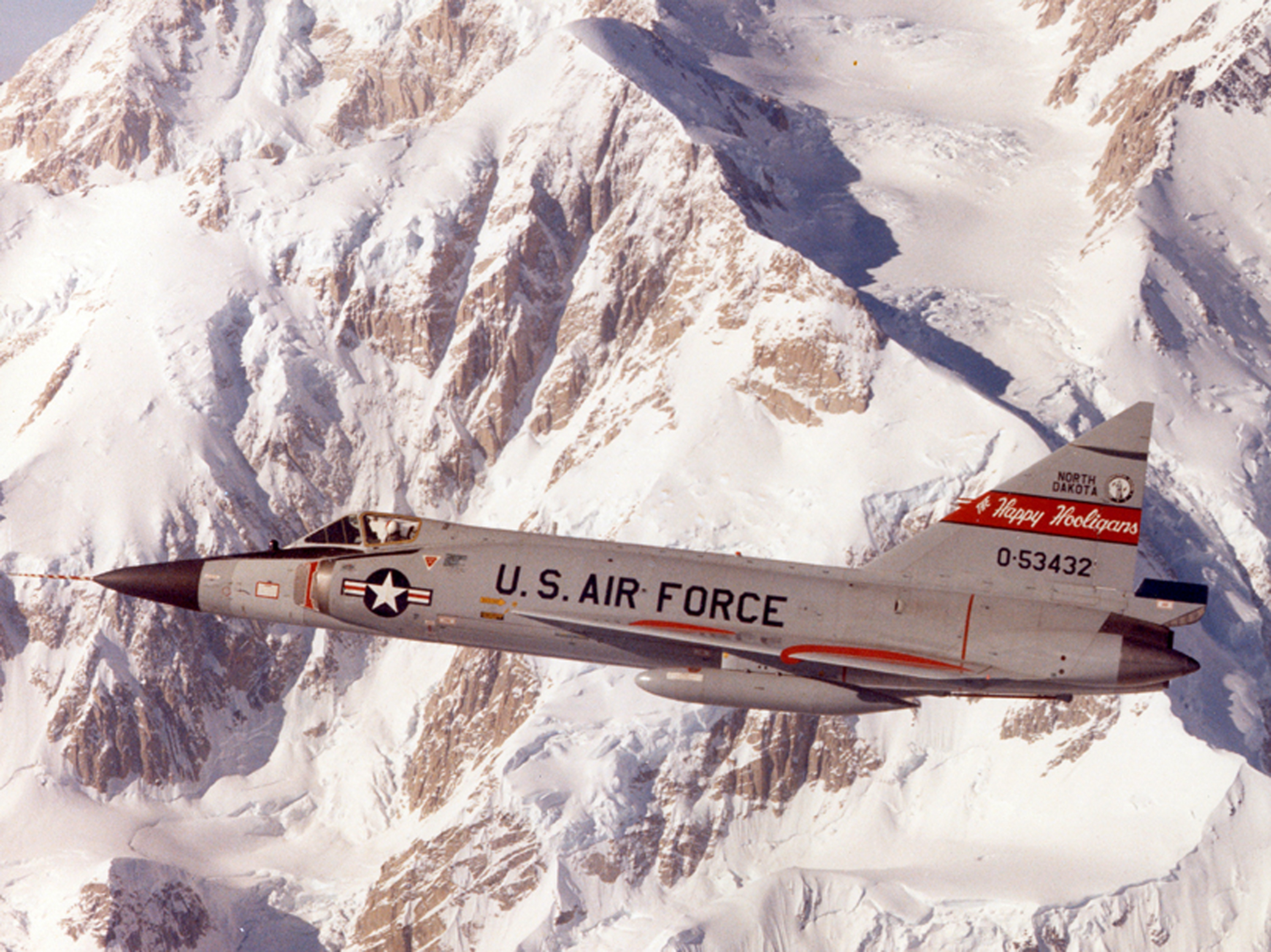
The F-102A was flown only from 1966 to 1969.

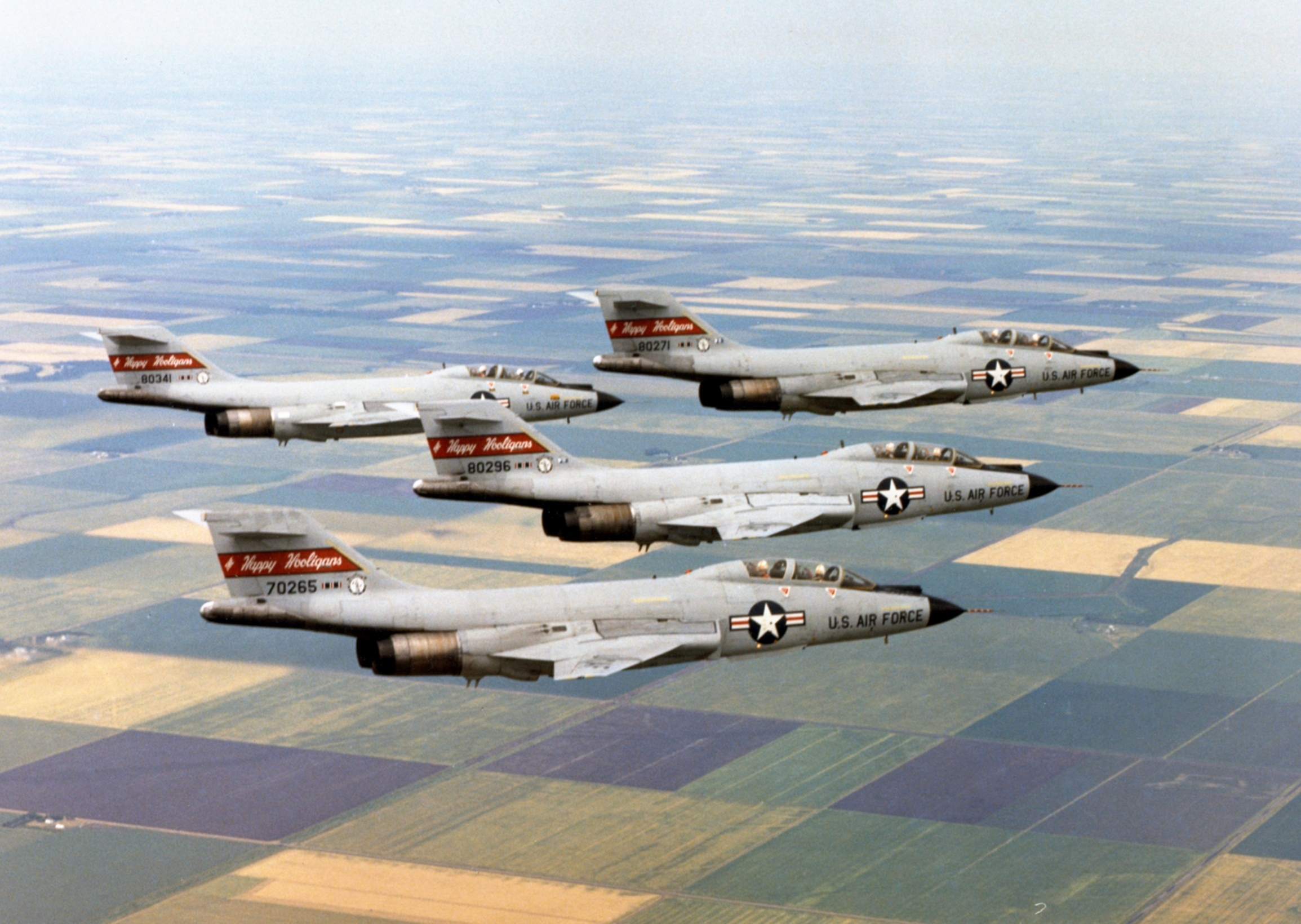
F-101B Voodoos in the 1970s.

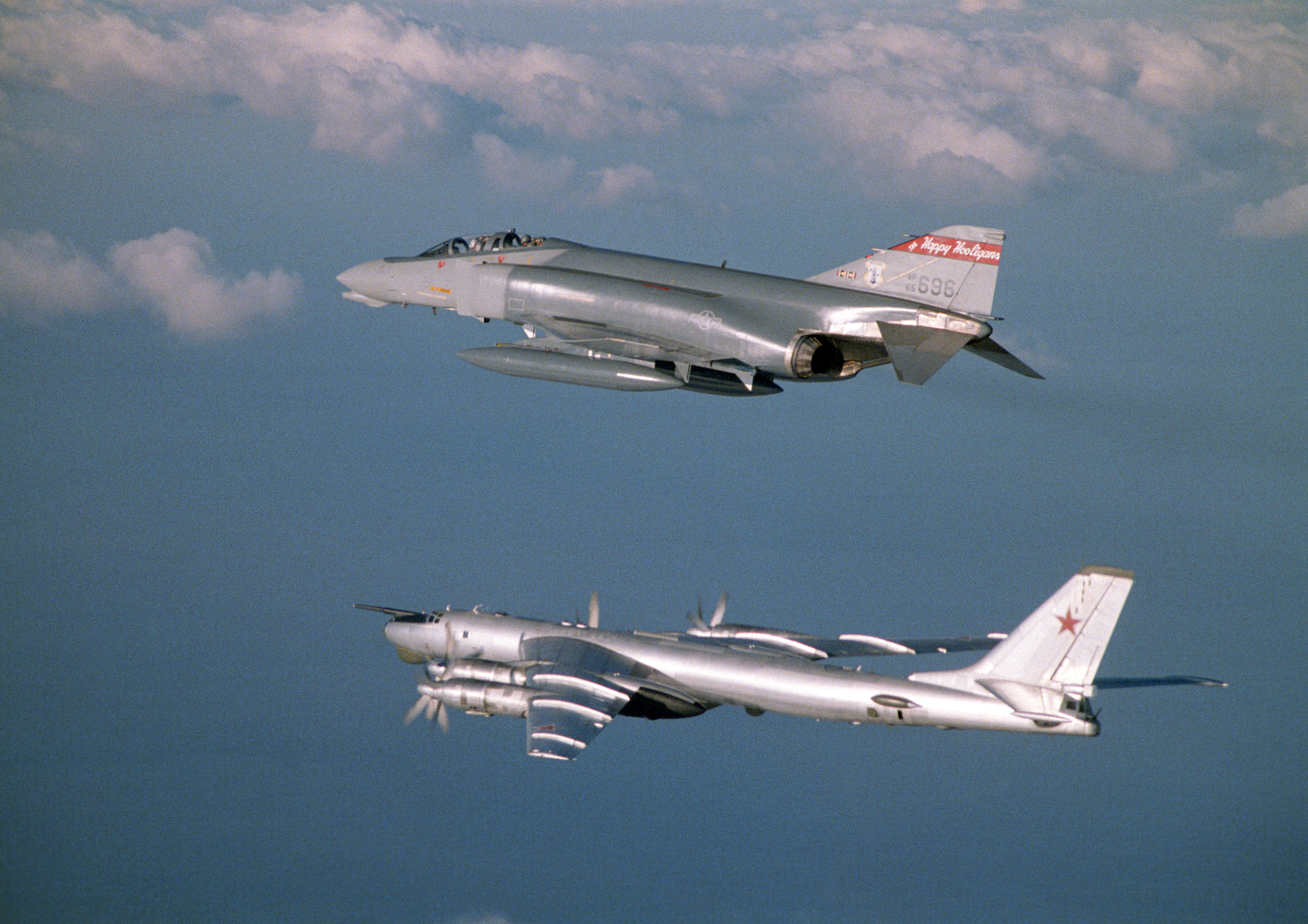
An F-4D intercepting a Soviet Tu-95 off Iceland, 1983.

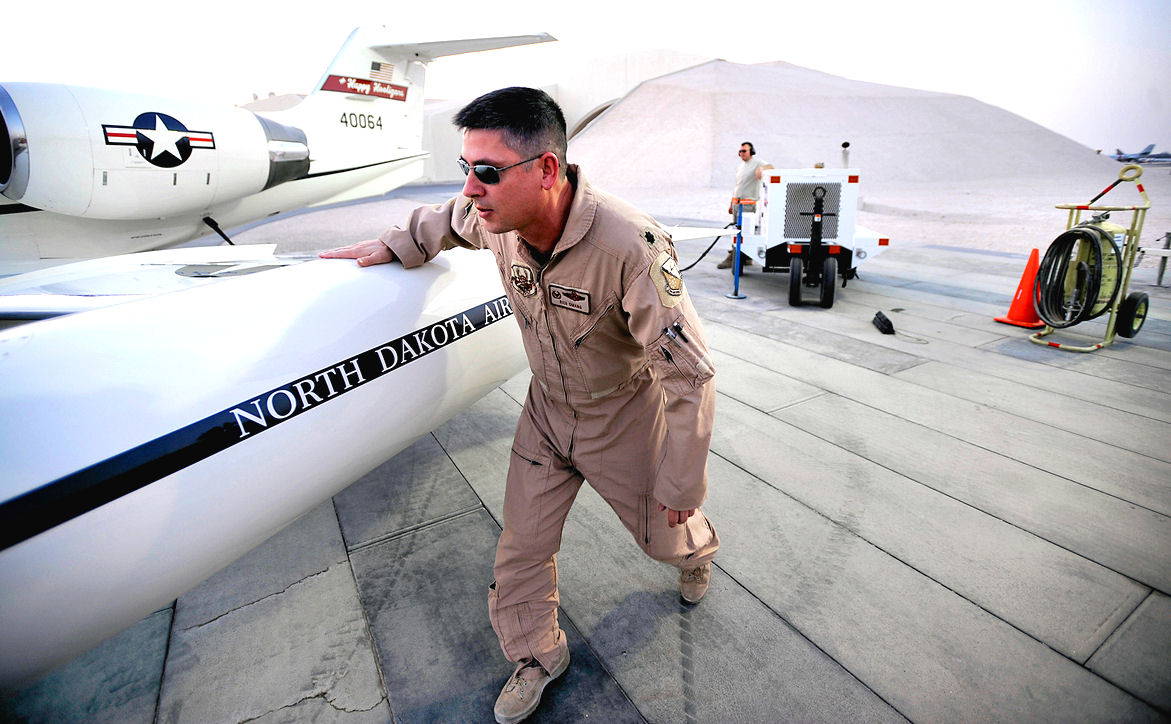
177th Airlift Squadron C-21 Learjet in Iraq, 2009

In 1956, the North Dakota Air National Guard 178th Fighter-Interceptor Squadron was authorized to expand to a group level, and the 119th Fighter Group (Air Defense) was established by the National Guard Bureau. The 178th FIS becoming the group's flying squadron. Other squadrons assigned into the group were the 119th Headquarters, 119th Material Squadron (Maintenance), 119th Combat Support Squadron, and the 119th USAF Dispensary.

The "Happy Hooligan" pilots were upgraded by ADC to the F-89 Scorpion in 1958, being one of the last units to fly the aircraft in 1966 when it received the supersonic F-102A Delta Dagger interceptor in 1966. It was again upgraded in 1969 to the F-101B Voodoo interceptor. In 1979, Aerospace Defense Command (ADCOM) was merged into Tactical Air Command (ADTAC) and the unit continued its air defense mission for ADTAC component of TAC with the F-4D Phantom II, transferring to First Air Force when ADTAC was replaced in 1985.

In 1970, the Happy Hooligans won their first William Tell International Weapons Competition. The event was held at Tyndall AFB, FL, and featured the F-101B. The following is a condensed recount of the 1970 Willy Tell event from retired NDANG weapons system officer (WSO) Lt. Col. Art Jacobson:

"The unit was new in the F-101 ‘Voodoo’ aircraft, beginning the conversion from the F-102 ‘Delta Dagger’ less than a year earlier, and faced many obstacles for the historic victory. The F-102 was a single seat aircraft and the F-101 was a two-seater. The NDANG had no trained WSOs at the beginning of the conversion.

In addition, the runway at Fargo was being re-paved that summer, and only open for limited hours. NDANG aircraft were moved to Sioux Falls and training missions had to be flown from there. Every morning crews boarded the NDANG C-54 for the flight to Sioux Falls, and after a long day of flying, the return trip. It made for very long days and real headaches for tools and parts for the maintenance guys.

One afternoon during the contest at Tyndall AFB, there was a thunderstorm soon after we landed. Our crew chiefs hastened to cover the aircraft nose and radome, while the competition ran for cover. The next morning the other airplanes had big problems with radar arcing, while we flew good missions with no problems.

The NDANG went on to participate in later William Tells (and was crowned overall winner three more times), but I think this one, as the first win, got the Air Force’s attention and showed what an outstanding unit the Fargo NDANG was. It was also a big matter of civic pride for Fargo.

An NDANG aircrew (Capt. Art Jacobson and Capt. Jim Reimers) won the top scoring Apple Splitter Trophy (later changed to Top Gun Award), and Happy Hooligan, Reimers, was the Top Gun pilot for the event."

The first overseas deployment of the North Dakota Air Guard occurred in 1983, with six F-4s and 120 support personnel deploying to NAS Keflavik, Iceland. Eight Soviet Tupolev Tu-95 "Bear" bombers were intercepted by Hooligan pilots during the deployment. In 1986, the 119th Fighter Group became the first core unit to assume the USAF Zulu alert mission at Ramstein Air Base, West Germany. Referred to as "Creek Klaxon", the 119th and other Air Defense units rotated to Ramstein and stood continuous alert for one year, providing air sovereignty in Western Europe for NATO. During Operation Desert Storm in 1991, 107 Happy Hooligans were mobilized and deployed in support of operations at numerous CONUS locations.

The 178th FS converted from the F-4 Phantom to the F-16A/B Fighting Falcon in mid-1990. The first aircraft were older block 5 and 10 models with some block 15 aircraft also being delivered to the squadron. Main task for the unit was air defense, as with many ANG units who were equipped with the F-16. In 1991 the F-16s were brought up to the Air Defense Fighter (ADF) variant. This meant a serious leap in performance and capability of this squadron in their defensive role.

The Hooligans earned first place at the October 1994 William Tell competition, a worldwide weapons meet which tests pilots and ground crews from the U.S. Air Force's top units in realistic, air-to-air combat situations. This was the Hooligans third William Tell victory, winning in 1970, 1972, and 1994, in addition to placing first among F-4 William Tell units in 1986. In 1994 the NDANG won the prestigious Hughes Trophy which recognizes the most outstanding air-to-air unit in the U.S. Air Force. The only Air National Guard unit to win the award twice, the Hooligans are also the only F-16 unit to ever win the Hughes Trophy.

A permanent alert detachment was established at Kingsley Field, Oregon, beginning 1 October 1989. The detachment, staffed by 18 members, was relocated to March Air Force Base, California, in July 1994 when the Oregon ANG took over full operation of Kingsley. An announcement was made in March 1999 that the squadron would convert from an air defense mission to a general purpose mission with 15 F-16A/B aircraft while activating an alert detachment at Langley AFB, Virginia.

=== Current status ===
In its 2005 BRAC Recommendations, DoD recommended to realign the mission of the North Dakota Air National Guard. The 119th Fighter Wing's F-16As (15 aircraft) would retire, with the aircraft reaching the end of their operational life. The reduction in F-16 numbers and the need to align common versions of the F-16 at the same bases argued for ending flying activities at the 119th Wing. In January 2007, the 119th officially retired the F-16 mission after 60 years of successful air defense interceptor missions.

Replacing the F-16s in 2007, the squadron began to receive the C-21A Learjet, being re-designated as an Airlift Squadron. The C-21 has with room for eight VIP passengers and 42 ft^{3} (1.26 m^{3}) of cargo. In addition to its normal role, the aircraft is capable of transporting litters during medical evacuations.

Later in 2007, it was announced that C-21 operations would be transferred to the newly activated ND ANG 177th Airlift Squadron, and the 179th would convert to the MQ-1 Predator, being re-designated as a Reconnaissance Squadron. In 2008 the first Predator was received.

In 2009, the 177th Airlift Squadron deployed to Iraq in support of Operation Iraqi Freedom. It was the first deployment into a combat zone for the North Dakota Air National Guard. The squadron transported more than 400 service members during their two-month-long rotation in theater. They accomplished this by flying more than 200 sorties during 90 missions, as part of the 379th Expeditionary Operations Group. In 2013, the squadron was programmed to receive the twin-turboprop C-27J Spartan medium transport aircraft but this did not materialize. In the same year, the C-21 mission was retired.

== Lineage ==
- Constituted as the 119th Fighter Group (Air Defense) and allotted to the Air National Guard

Activated and extended federal recognition on 16 April 1956
Redesignated 119th Fighter-Interceptor Group on 1 July 1972
Redesignated 119th Fighter Group on 23 March 1992
Redesignated 119th Fighter Wing on 17 October 1995
Redesignated 119th Airlift Wing on 1 October 2007
Redesignated 119th Wing on 1 March 2008

=== Assignments ===
- 133d Air Defense Wing, 16 April 1956
- 128th Air Defense Wing, 1 January 1960
- 132d Air Defense Wing, 1 June 1965
- North Dakota Air National Guard, 1 August 1969
- 142d Fighter-Interceptor Wing, 1 January 1972
- North Dakota Air National Guard, 1974–present

Gaining Commands
Air Defense Command (later Aerospace Defense Command), 16 April 1956
Tactical Air Command, 1 October 1979
Air Combat Command, 1 June 1992
Gained by: Air Mobility Command, 1 October 2007
177th Airlift Squadron gained by: Air Mobility Command, 11 March 2008–2013
178th Reconnaissance Squadron gained by: Air Combat Command, 11 March 2008–Present

=== Components ===
- 119th Operations Group, c. 1 October 1995 – present
- 178th Fighter-Interceptor Squadron (later 178th Fighter Squadron), 16 April 1956 – c. 1 October 1995

Detachment at Kingsley Field, Oregon, 1 October 1989 – 31 July 1994
Detachment at March Joint Air Reserve Base, California, 1 August 1994 – June 2007
Detachment at Langley Air Force Base, Virginia, 1 March 1999 – June 2007

=== Stations ===
- Hector Airport (later Hector International Airport, Fargo Air National Guard Base), Fargo, North Dakota, 16 April 1956 – present

=== Aircraft ===
- P-51D Mustang, 1947-1954
- F-94A Starfire, 1956–1958
- F-89D Scorpion, 1958–1959
- F-89J Scorpion, 1959–1966
- F-102A Delta Dagger, 1966–1969
- F-101B Voodoo, 1969–1977
- F-4D Phantom II, 1977–1990
- F-16A/B Fighting Falcon, 1990–2007
- C-21A Learjet, 2007–2013
- MQ-1B Predator, 2007–2017
- MQ-9 Reaper, 2008-Present

=== Decorations ===
- Air Force Outstanding Unit Award
