= Fargo Air National Guard Base =

- Fargo, North Dakota in the United States of America
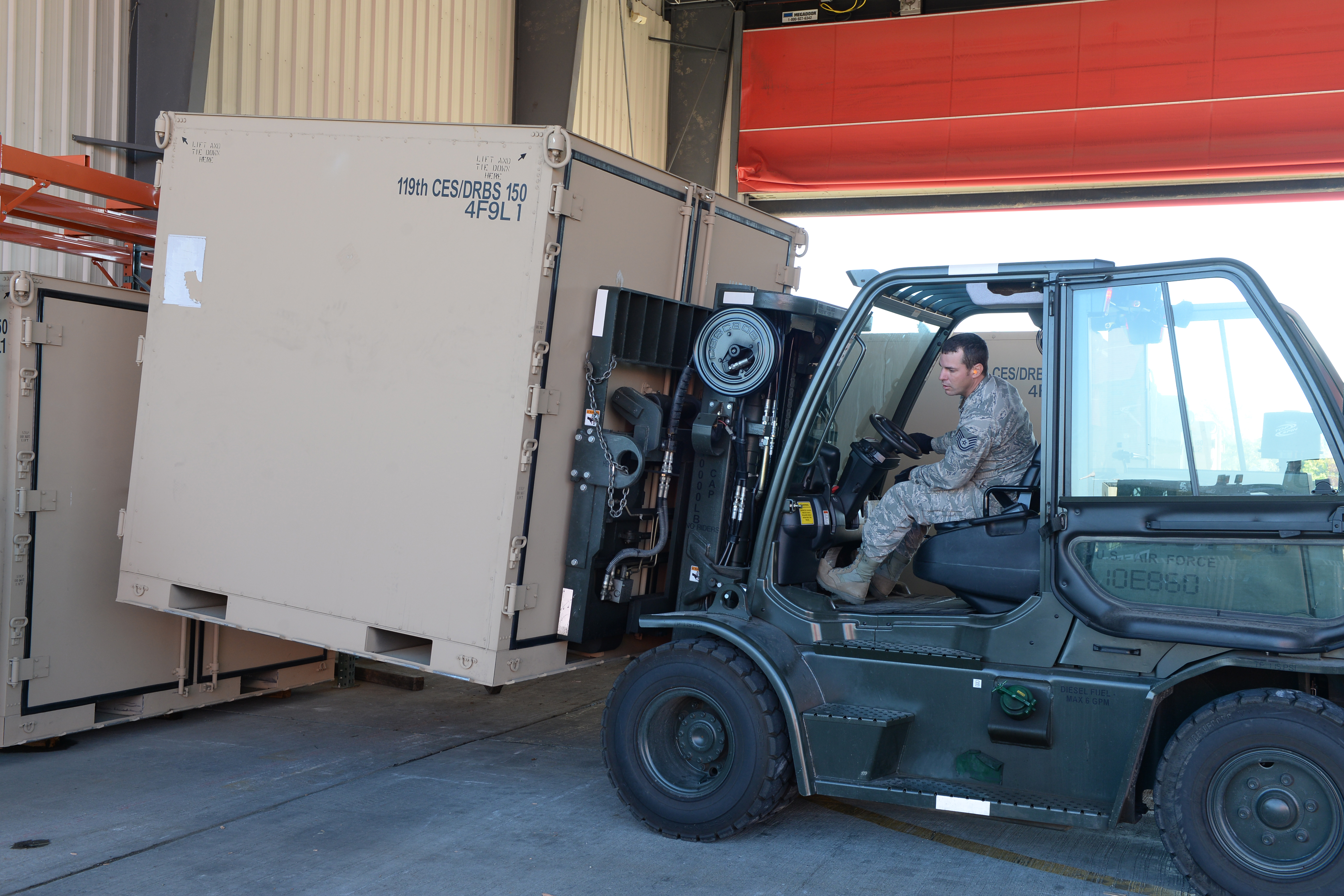
- A forklift of the 119th Logistics Readiness Squadron maneuvers a Disaster Relief Beddown Set (DRBS) container into position while preparing it for shipping at North Dakota ANGB during September 2017.

Site information
- Type: Air National Guard Base
- Owner: Department of Defense
- Operator: US Air Force (USAF)
- Controlled by: North Dakota Air National Guard
- Condition: Operational
- Website: www.119wg.ang.af.mil

Location
- Location in the United States
- Coordinates: 46°55′14″N 096°48′57″W

Site history
- Built: 1947
- In use: 1947 – present

Garrison information
- Current commander: Colonel Darrin K Anderson
- Garrison: 119th Wing

Airfield information
- Identifiers: IATA: FAR, ICAO: KFAR, FAA LID: FAR, WMO: 727530
- Elevation: 274.6 metres (901 ft) AMSL
Runways
Direction	Length and surface
18/36	2,743.2 metres (9,000 ft) Concrete
9/27	1,920.8 metres (6,302 ft) Concrete
13/31	1,158.5 metres (3,801 ft) Concrete
- Airfield shared with Hector International Airport; Source: Federal Aviation Administration

Fargo Air National Guard Base is a United States Air National Guard facility located at Hector International Airport in Fargo, North Dakota. The 119th Wing is based at Fargo and operates the MQ-9A Reaper.

== History ==
The North Dakota Air National Guard was established on 16 January 1947 at Hector Airport, Fargo.

== Based units ==
Flying and notable non-flying units based at Fargo Air National Guard Base.

=== United States Air Force ===
Air National Guard

- North Dakota Air National Guard
  - 119th Wing
    - Headquarters 119th Wing
    - 119th Operations Group
      - 119th Maintenance Squadron
      - 119th Operations Support Squadron
      - 178th Attack Squadron – MQ-9A Reaper
    - 119th Intelligence, Reconnaissance, and Surveillance Group
      - 176th Intelligence Squadron
      - 177th Intelligence Squadron
      - 119th Intelligence Support Squadron
    - 119th Medical Group
    - 119th Mission Support Group
      - 119th Civil Engineering Squadron
      - 119th Force Support Squadron
      - 119th Logistics Readiness Squadron
      - 119th Security Forces Squadron

== See also ==
- North Dakota World War II Army Airfields
- Fargo Air Museum
