= North Dakota Air National Guard =

Component of the US Army and military

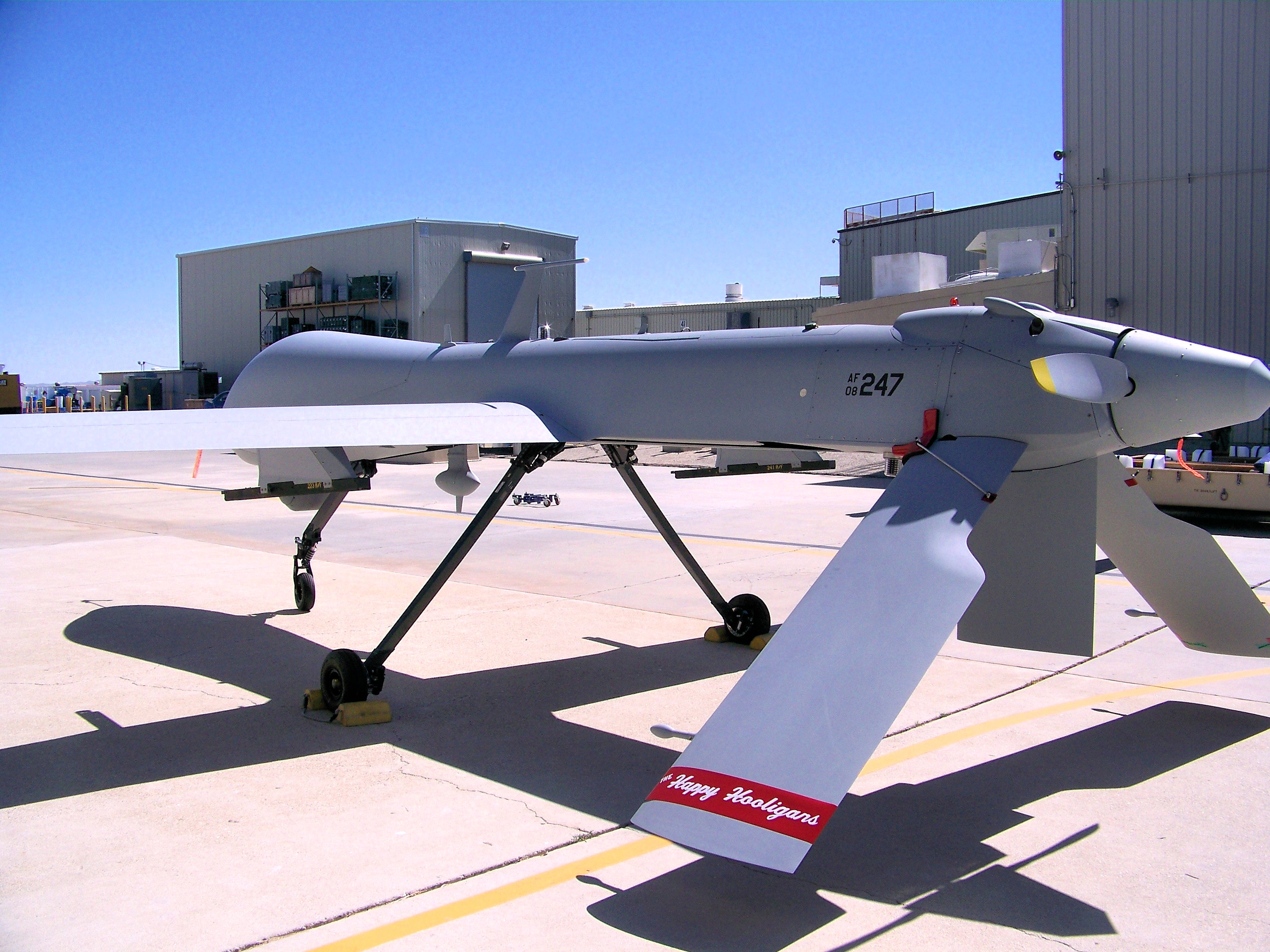
- An MQ-1B-10 Predator of the 178th Reconnaissance Squadron. The 178th is the oldest unit in the North Dakota Air National Guard, having over 60 years of service to the state and nation.
- Active: 1 February 1947 - present
- Country: United States
- Allegiance: North Dakota
- Branch: Air National Guard
- Type: State militia, military reserve force
- Role: "To meet state and federal mission responsibilities."
- Part of: North Dakota Department Of Military Affairs; U.S. National Guard Bureau
- Garrison/HQ: North Dakota Air National Guard; 1400 32d Avenue North, Fargo, North Dakota

Commanders
- Civilian leadership: President Donald Trump (Commander-in-Chief); Troy Meink (Secretary of the Air Force); Governor Kelly Armstrong (Governor of North Dakota)
- State military leadership: Brigadier General Mitchell R. Johnson

Insignia
- Emblem of the Air National Guard

Aircraft flown
- Patrol: General Atomics MQ-9 Reaper

The North Dakota Air National Guard (ND ANG) is the aerial militia of the State of North Dakota, United States. It's a reserve of the United States Air Force and along with the North Dakota Army National Guard is an element of the North Dakota National Guard of the larger United States National Guard Bureau.

As state militia units, the units in the North Dakota Air National Guard are not in the normal United States Air Force chain of command. They are under the jurisdiction of the governor of North Dakota though the office of the North Dakota Adjutant General unless they are federalized by order of the president of the United States. The North Dakota Air National Guard is headquartered in Fargo, and its commander is currently Major General Alan S. Dohrmann.

== Overview ==
Under the "Total Force" concept, North Dakota Air National Guard units are considered to be Air Reserve Components (ARC) of the United States Air Force (USAF). North Dakota ANG units are trained and equipped by the Air Force and are operationally gained by a major command of the USAF if federalized. In addition, the North Dakota Air National Guard forces are assigned to Air Expeditionary Forces and are subject to deployment tasking orders along with their active duty and Air Force Reserve counterparts in their assigned cycle deployment window.

Along with their federal reserve obligations, as state militia units the elements of the North Dakota ANG are subject to being activated by order of the governor to provide protection of life and property, and preserve peace, order and public safety. State missions include disaster relief in times of earthquakes, hurricanes, floods and forest fires, search and rescue, protection of vital public services, and support to civil defense.

== Components ==
The North Dakota Air National Guard consists of the following major unit:

- 119th Wing

Established 1 February 1947 (as: 178th Fighter Squadron)
Stationed at: Fargo Air National Guard Base
Gained by: Air Combat Command
The mission of the 119th Wing is reconnaissance.

The 178th Reconnaissance Squadron includes operations of the General Atomics MQ-9 Reaper, a medium-altitude, long-endurance, remotely piloted aircraft.

- 219th Security Forces Squadron, attached to 91st Missile Wing, Twentieth Air Force

== History ==
On 24 May 1946, the United States Army Air Forces, in response to dramatic postwar military budget cuts imposed by President Harry S. Truman, allocated inactive unit designations to the National Guard Bureau for the formation of an Air Force National Guard. These unit designations were allotted and transferred to various State National Guard bureaus to provide them unit designations to re-establish them as Air National Guard units.

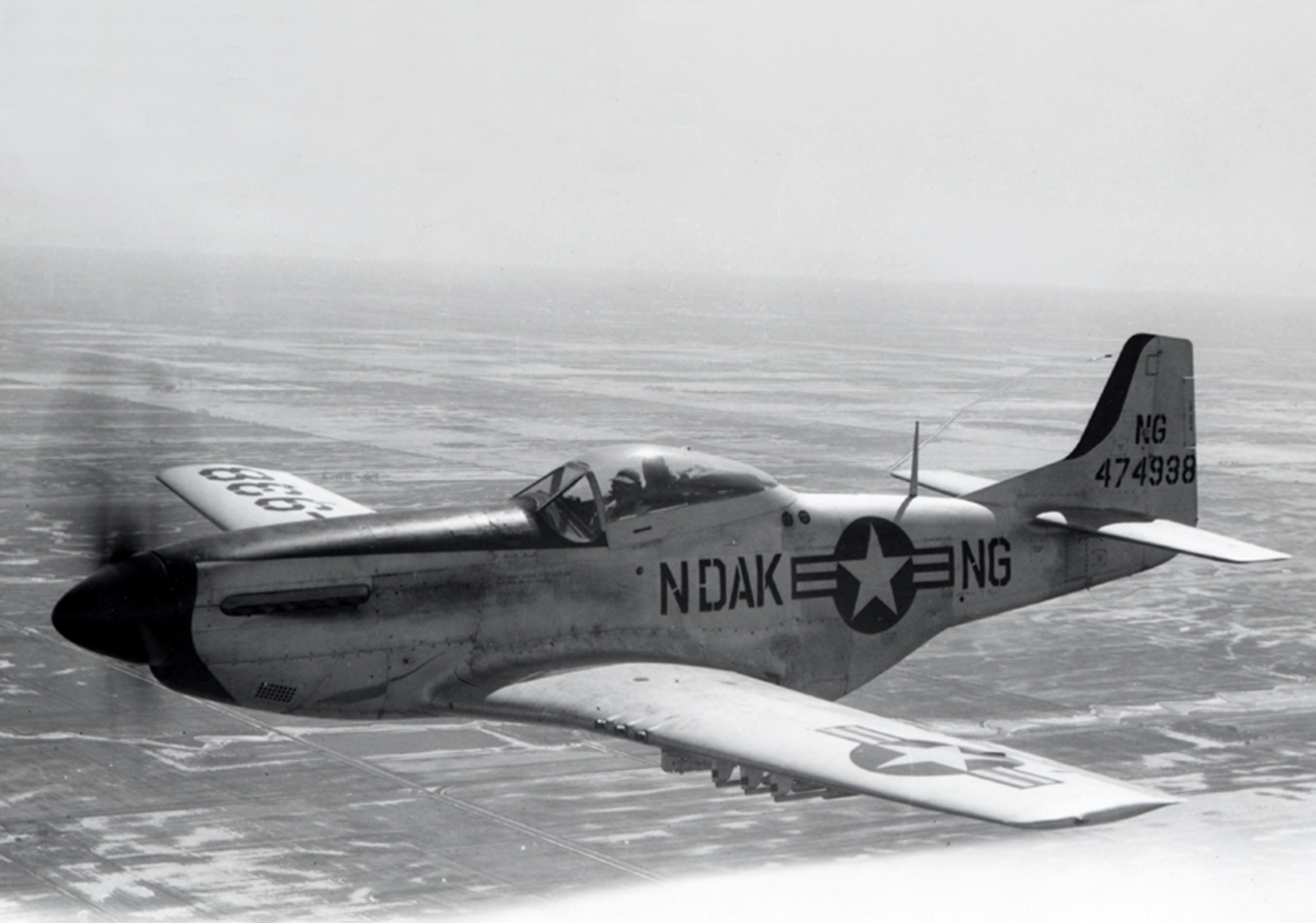
An F-51D Mustang of the 178th Fighter Squadron, 1947. Note the "NG" (National Guard) fuselage designation, dating the photo prior to the official establishment of the Air National Guard in September.

The North Dakota Air National Guard received federal recognition on 1 February 1947 as the 1178th Fighter Squadron at Hector Field, Fargo. It was equipped with F-51D Mustangs and its mission was the air defense of the state. 18 September 1947, however, is considered the North Dakota Air National Guard's official birth concurrent with the establishment of the United States Air Force as a separate branch of the United States military under the National Security Act.

The North Dakota Air National Guard has been tasked to perform its state mission on many occasions. Prominent examples include Operation Haylift in 1949, providing relief to blizzard-bound farms and ranches, and more recently, Operation Snowball and Operation Good Neighbor in 1997, to combat unprecedented winter snowfall and spring flooding conditions throughout North Dakota.

Federalization of the North Dakota Air National Guard occurred during the Korean War, with the unit mobilized and ordered to active duty in 1951, returning to Fargo and state control in 1953. It also occurred following the September 11 attacks in 2001, when hundreds of airmen were voluntarily recalled to active duty status for Operation Noble Eagle, under the North American Aerospace Defense Command and the "all States agreement".

Air Defense alert has been a major part of the North Dakota Air National Guard's tasking since September 1953. The unit provided alert coverage at Fargo, with either two or four aircraft continuously on status, until March 1990 when home station alert was discontinued. Other alert sites include March Air Reserve Base, California, and Kingsley Field, near Klamath Falls, Oregon. The most recent permanent alert detachment was at Langley Air Force Base, Virginia with 36 full-time personnel operating aircraft maintenance, munitions, supply, administrative and operational command responsibilities. The detachment closed in October 2006 due to the change from the F-16C fighter to the Learjet C-21A transport.

The first overseas deployment of the North Dakota Air Guard occurred in 1983, with six F-4D Phantom II fighters and 120 support personnel deploying to Naval Air Station Keflavik, Iceland. Eight Soviet Tupolev Tu-95 reconnaissance aircraft were intercepted by the "Happy Hooligan" pilots during the deployment. In 1986, the 119th Fighter Group became the first core unit to assume the USAF Zulu alert mission at Ramstein Air Base, Germany. Referred to as "Creek Klaxon", the 119th and other air defense units stood continuous alert for one year providing air sovereignty in Europe for NATO. During Operation Desert Storm, 107 North Dakota ANG members were mobilized and deployed in support of operations at numerous locations in the United States. The Lockheed C-130 Hercules support aircraft assigned to the North Dakota Air National Guard and aircrew also provided stateside airlift of personnel and equipment to support Operation Desert Storm. Most recently, after Hurricane Katrina destroyed the Gulf Coast of the United States, the 119th Fighter Wing answered the call for assistance, responding with less than forty-eight hours notice and deployed 64 personnel from the Civil Engineering Squadron, prepared 228.1 tonnes of equipment and supplies and loaded three C-5A Galaxy and one C-130H transport aircraft for deployment to Gulfport, Mississippi, to build and support the tent city required to house over 2,000 National Guard relief workers. The Services Flight also prepared over 210,000 meals over a 60-day period for the relief workers.

In its 2005 Base Realignment and Closure recommendations, the United States Department of Defense recommended to realign the 119th Fighter Wing and retire the wing's 15 F-16s. Hector IAP ranked low in military value. The reduction in the F-16 force structure and the need to align common versions of the F-16 at the same bases argued for realigning Hector IAP to allow its aircraft to retire without a flying mission backfill. As of 2006 the NDANG flew the Learjet C-21A executive transport until the mission ended in 2013. The North Dakota ANG was also running a General Atomics MQ-1 Predator flight operations squadron in Fargo which flew daily in Iraq.

== See also ==
- Grand Forks Air Force Base
- Minot Air Force Base
- South Dakota Air National Guard (Sioux Falls)
- Minnesota Air National Guard (Twin Cities, Duluth)
- 119th Wing
