= Learjet 35 =

Executive business jet series

Learjet 35/36
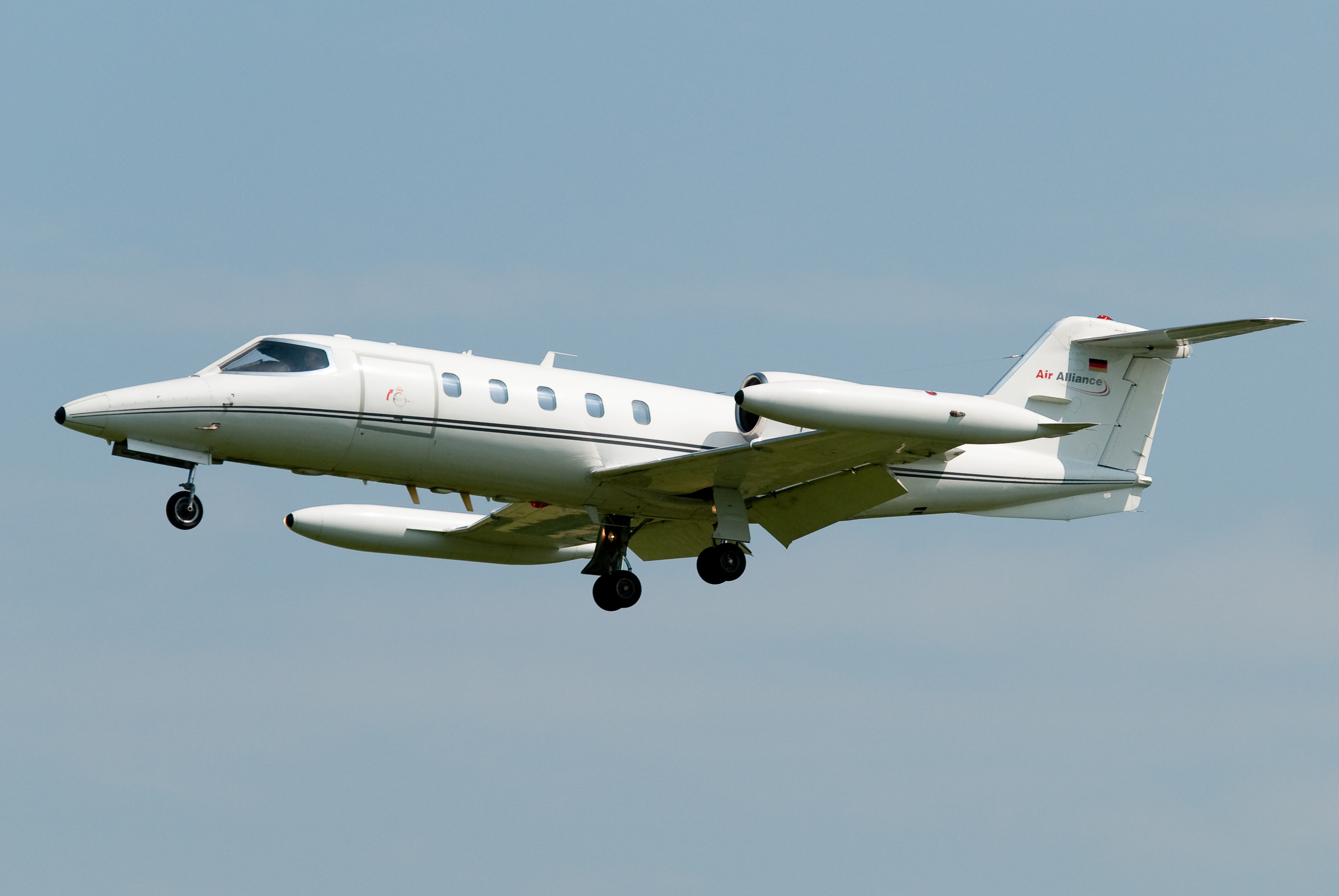
- An Air Alliance Learjet 35 landing

General information
- Type: Business jet
- Manufacturer: Learjet
- Status: Operational
- Primary user: General aviation, United States Air Force
- Number built: 738

History
- Manufactured: 1973–1994
- First flight: 22 August 1973
- Developed from: Learjet 25

The Learjet Model 35 and Model 36 are a series of American multi-role business jets and military transport aircraft manufactured by Learjet between 1973 and 1993. When used by the United States Air Force, they carry the designation C-21A. Learjet was acquired by Bombardier Aviation in 1990 as a subsidiary, so the aircraft is also known as the Bombardier Learjet 35.

When first released in 1973, the Learjet 35 was among the fastest medium haul jets of its era. As of 2020, more Learjet 35s have been sold than any other Learjet aircraft, with many still in service after 50 years.

The aircraft are powered by two Garrett TFE731-2 turbofan engines. Its cabin can be arranged for six to eight passengers. The longer-range Model 36 has a shortened passenger area to provide more space in the aft fuselage for fuel tanks.

The engines are mounted in nacelles on the sides of the aft fuselage. The wings are equipped with single-slotted flaps. The wingtip fuel tanks distinguish the design from other aircraft having similar functions.

== Development ==
The concept which became the LJ35 began as the Learjet 25BGF (with GF referring to "Garrett Fan"), a Learjet 25 with a then-new TFE731 turbofan engine mounted on the left side in place of the 25's General Electric CJ610 turbojet engine. This testbed aircraft first flew in May, 1971. As a result of the increased power and reduced noise of the new engine, Learjet further improved the design, and instead of being simply a variant of the 25, it became its own model, the 35.

By 2018, 1980s Learjet 35As start at $500,000.

== Operational history ==
When released in 1973, Learjet's marketing claimed that the Learjet 35 was among the fastest business jets in its class. In 1976 American professional golfer Arnold Palmer used a Learjet 36 to establish a new round-the-world class record of 22,894 miles (36990 km) completed in 57 hours 25 minutes 42 seconds.

Because of its speed and long range, leaders of many nations bought the aircraft as their primary or secondary jet. Countries who did this include: Brazil, Chile, Finland, Switzerland and Saudi Arabia among others.

During the Cold War, the Finnish Air Force used the Learjet 35/36 as a shorter range AEW&C aircraft, for monitoring Soviet bombers and fighter jets coming over the Baltic Sea and over the Arctic. Learjet 35s made the bulk of Argentina's Escuadrón Fénix flights during the 1982 Falklands War mainly on diversion and reconnaissance flights.

Production on the 35/36 series ceased in 1994. There are still well over 500 Learjet 35s in service around the world, despite the model being almost 50 years old.

As of January 2018, the U.S. National Transportation Safety Board database lists 25 fatal accidents for the 35/35A, and two for the 36/36A.

=== Success and popularity ===
When first released in 1973, the Learjet 35 was among the fastest medium haul jets of its era. As of 2020, more Learjet 35s have been sold than any other Learjet aircraft.

As a private jet the Learjet 35 was popular because of its good range (it can fly 2,056 miles nonstop), takeoff and landing performance (its Honeywell engines provide 3,500 pounds of thrust and can land on short runways at regional airports), fast cruise capabilities (it can cruise at speeds as high as 451 knots true airspeed (KTAS), or 424 KTAS with four passengers), good handling characteristics, a low fuel burn, and comfortable cabins. Together with the Learjet 25, the Learjet 35 was a favorite among celebrities.

The Learjet 35 has been used to film aerial sequences for movies. A camera-equipped Learjet 35 was used to film some of the aerial sequences for the 1980 film The Final Countdown.

== Variants ==
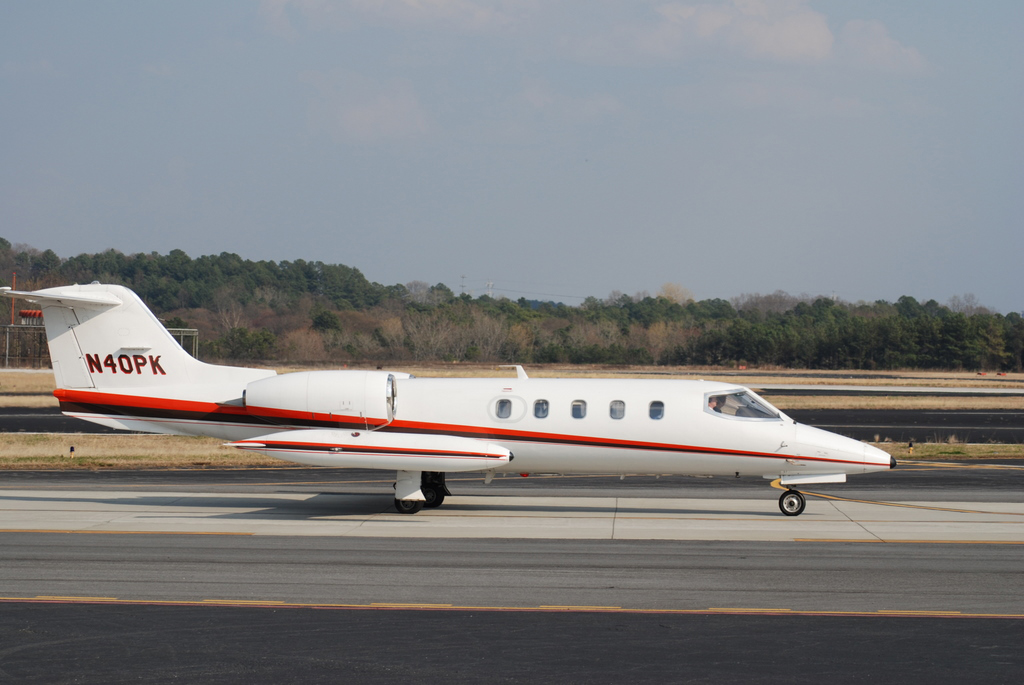
The Learjet 35A.

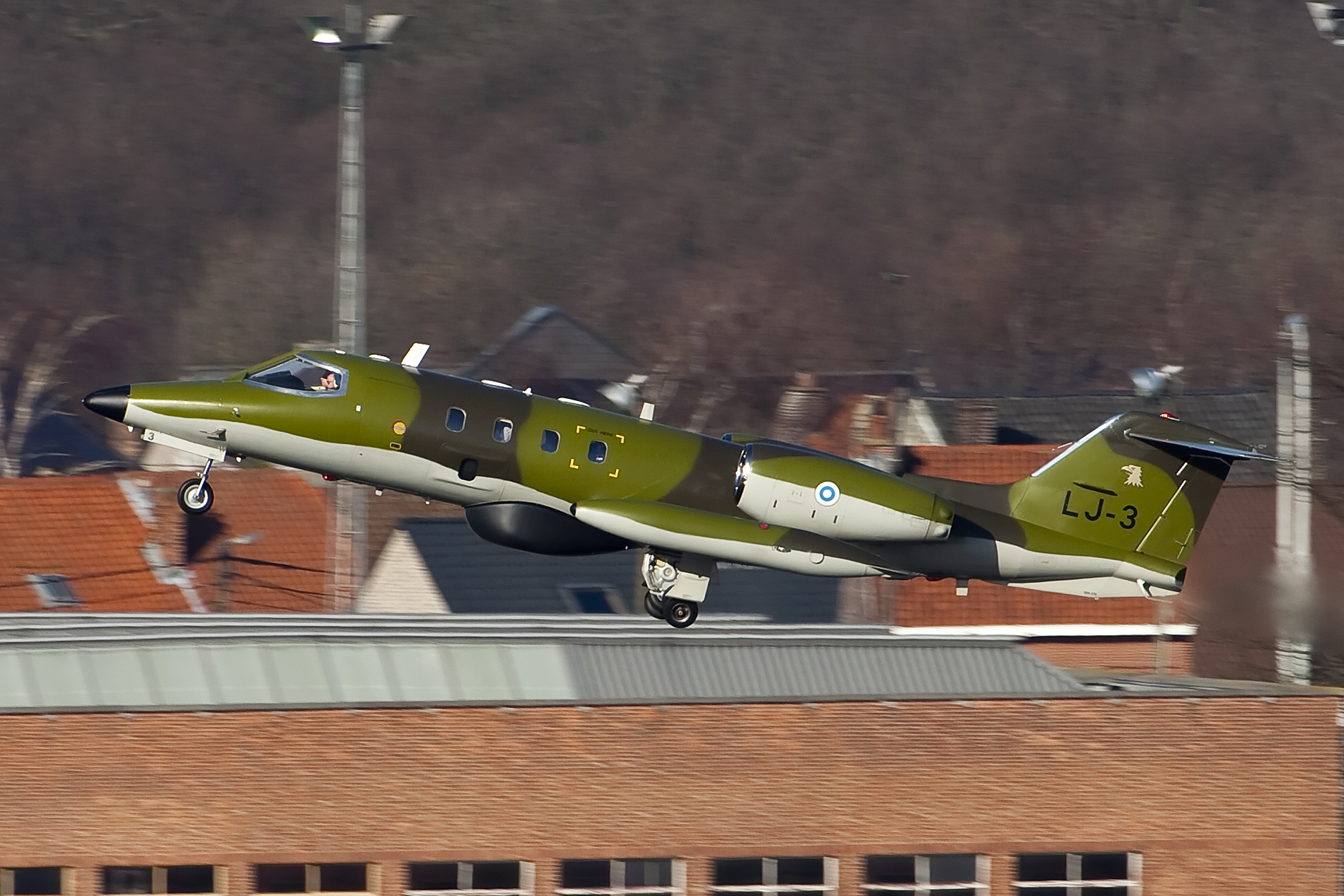
Finnish Air Force Learjet 35AS.

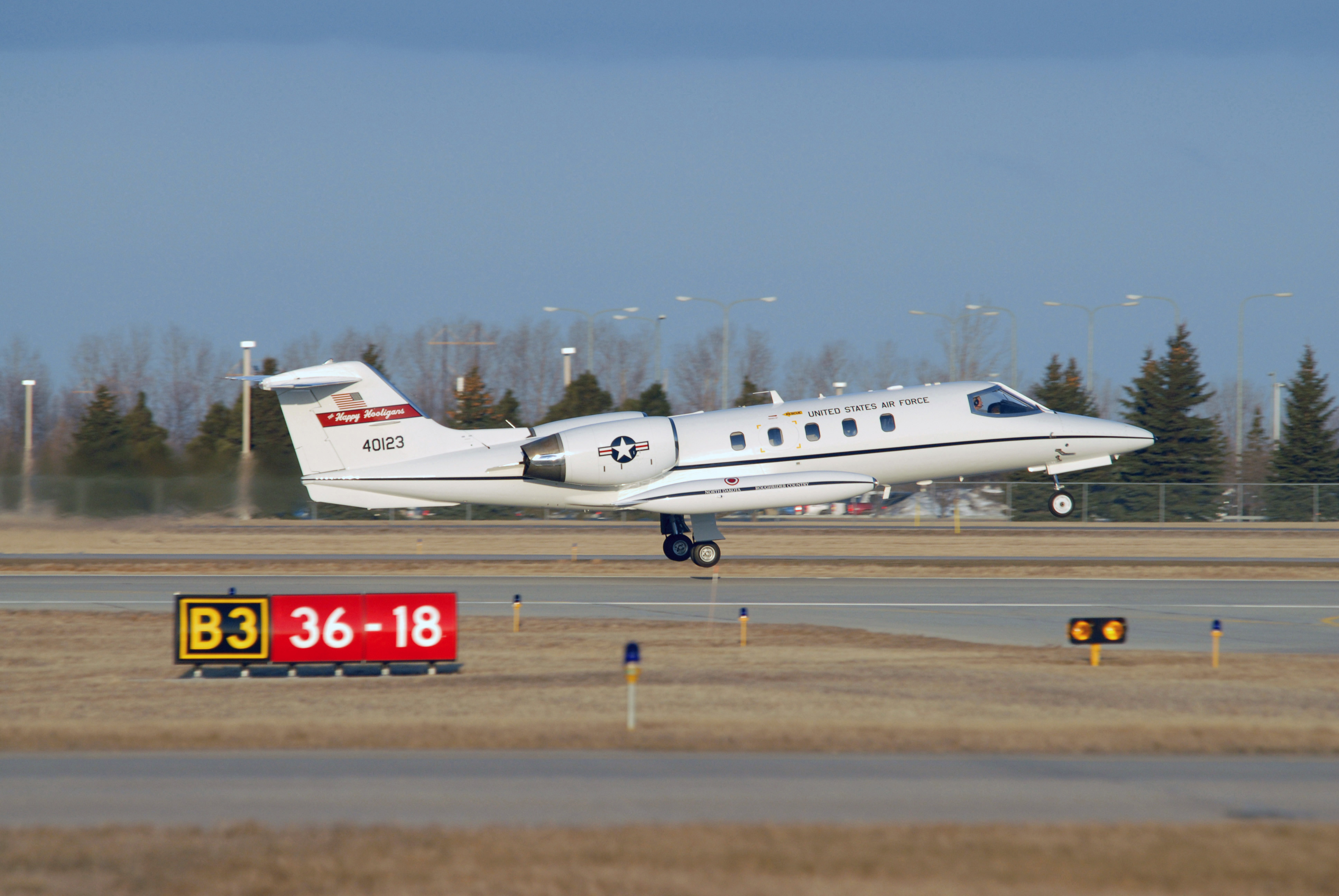
A C-21A Learjet attached to the North Dakota Air National Guard's (NDANG) 119th Fighter Wing.

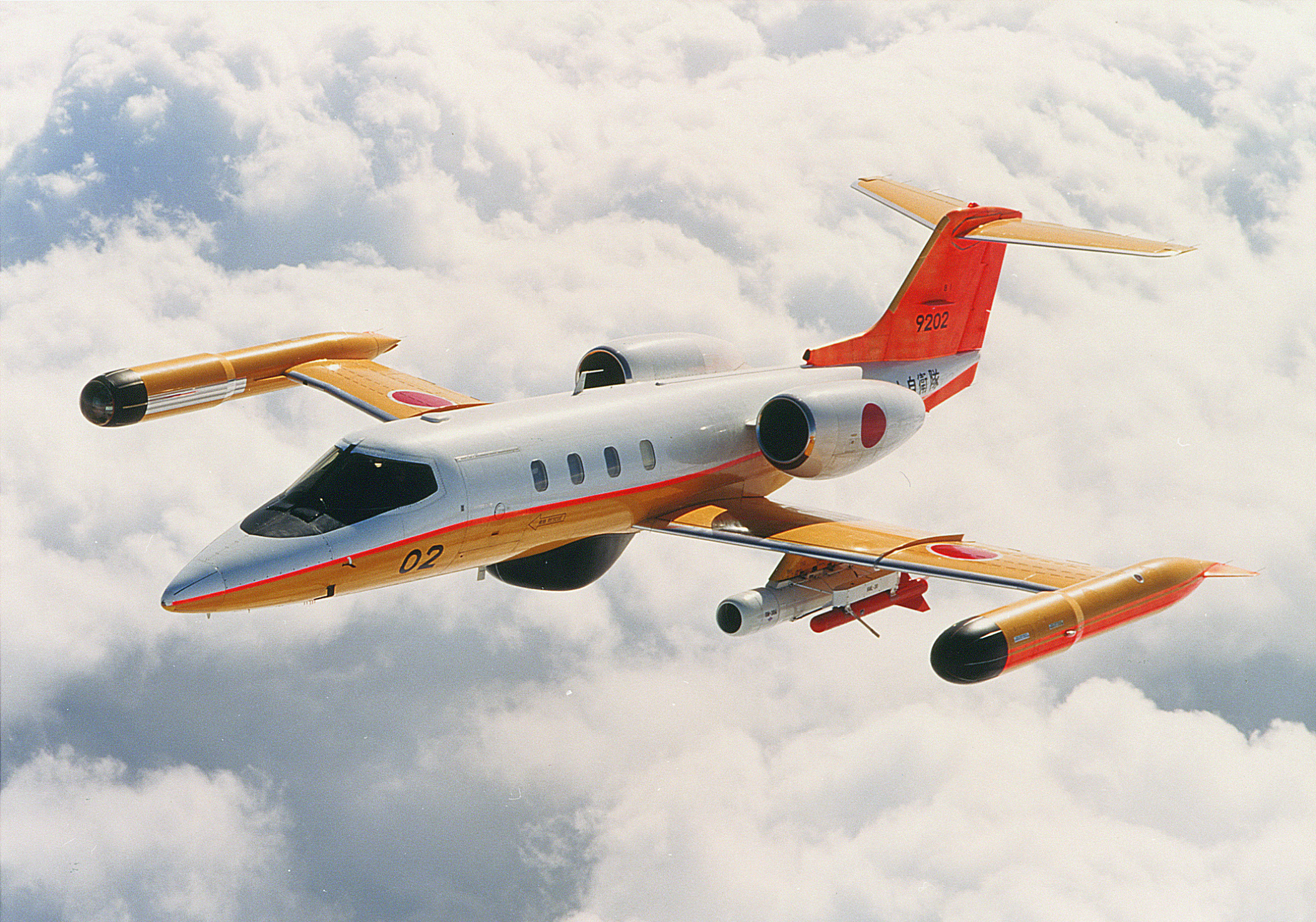
Japan Maritime Self-Defense Force U-36A 9202 on 21 May 2003 when it crashed at Iwakuni after a possible bird hit while performing touch and goes, .

=== Learjet 35 ===
The original Model 35 was powered by two TFE731-2-2A engines and was 13 inches (330 mm) longer than its predecessor, the Model 25. First flight of the prototype Model 35 was on 22 August 1973, and the aircraft was FAA certified in July, 1974. It could carry up to eight passengers. There were 64 base-model 35s built.

=== Learjet 35A ===
The Model 35A is an upgraded Model 35 with TFE731-2-2B engines and a range of 2,789 miles, with a fuel capacity of 931 US gallons (3,520 L; 775 imp gal) with refueling accomplished at ground level through each wingtip tank. It was introduced in 1976, replacing the 35. Over 600 35As were built, with a production line that ended with serial number 677, in 1993.

On February 12, 1996, a Learjet 35A, N10BD, owned by Cable Television Founder Bill Daniels and piloted by Mark E. Calkins, former astronaut Pete Conrad, Paul Thayer, and Daniel C. Miller completed an around-the-world flight in a record 49 hrs, 21 min, and 8 sec. The record remains standing as of 2015, and this aircraft is now on display in Terminal C of Denver International Airport.

Learjet 36
The Model 36 is essentially identical to the 35, except that it has a larger fuselage fuel tank, giving it 500 miles (800 km) longer range, but reducing the passenger area's length by 18 inches (460 mm). It was certified, along with the 35, in July, 1974.

Learjet 36A
Like the 35A, the Model 36A has upgraded engines and a higher maximum gross weight. It was introduced in 1976, replacing the 36.

=== Military variants ===
C-21A
The C-21A is a United States military designation for an "off the shelf" variant of the Learjet 35A for the United States Air Force, with room for eight passengers and 42 ft^{3} (1.26 m^{3}) of cargo. In addition to its normal role, the aircraft is capable of transporting litters during medical evacuations. Delivery of the C-21A fleet began in April 1984 and was completed in October 1985.

There are 38 Air Force active duty aircraft, and 18 Air National Guard aircraft in the C-21A fleet. On 1 April 1997, all continental U.S.-based C-21As were realigned under Air Mobility Command, with the 375th Airlift Wing at Scott Air Force Base, Illinois, as the lead command. C-21As stationed outside the continental United States are assigned to the theater commanders.

C-35
Brazilian Air Force designation for the cargo version of the Learjet 35.

R-35A
Brazilian Air Force designation for the reconnaissance version of the Learjet 35.

VU-35A
Brazilian Air Force designation for the VIP transport version of the Learjet 35.

U-36A
A Japanese military designation (not a U.S. military designation). Utility transport, training version of the Learjet 36A. Equipped with a missile seeker simulator in addition to a radar, avionics, firing training assessment devices, an ejector pylon, a special communications system, a target towing system and a jammer system. Six were built for the Japan Maritime Self-Defense Force. Delivered of March 1986 of December 1993. Two aircraft were written off, 9202 on 21 May 2003 when it crashed at Iwakuni after a possible bird hit while performing touch and goes, and 9203 on 28 February 1991 when it hit the water during a low level ECM Exercise. In a ceremony on 10 March 2025 at MCAS Iwakuni, the JMSDF retired its last U-36A Learjets.

B.TL.12
(Thai: บ.ตล.๑๒) Royal Thai Armed Forces designation for the Learjet 35A.

== Notable accidents and incidents ==
- On 7 June 1982, during the Falklands War, a Learjet 35 of Argentina's Escuadrón Fénix was shot down by HMS Exeter. The aircraft had been participating in a reconnaissance mission when it was hit by a Sea Dart surface-to-air missile launched by the destroyer. All five crew were killed.
- On 13 February 1983, a Learjet 35A carrying Sri Lankan business tycoon Upali Wijewardene disappeared over the Straits of Malacca (Malaysia). The wreckage has never been found, nor any trace of Wijewardene, his top executives, or crew.
- On 17 September 1994, a Learjet 35A owned by Golden Eagle Aviation was accidentally shot down by the Republic of China Navy while being used as a target tug. All four crew on board were killed.
- On 17 April 1995, a C-21 crashed into a wooded area near Alexander City, Alabama killing the two pilots and six passengers, including Clark G. Fiester, assistant secretary of the Air Force for acquisition, and Major General Glenn A Profitt II.
- The 1996 New Hampshire Learjet 35A crash on Christmas Eve, 24 December, led to the longest missing aircraft search in that state's history, lasting almost three years, and eventually resulted in Congressional legislation mandating improved emergency locator transmitters (ELTs) be installed in U.S.-registered business jets.
- On 29 August 1999, a U.S.-registered Learjet 35A owned by Corporate Jets, Inc., was shot down near Adwa, Ethiopia, while flying from Luxor, Egypt, to Nairobi, Kenya, killing both crew members, the only two people on board.
- On 25 October 1999, professional golfer Payne Stewart and five others were killed in the crash of a Learjet 35. The plane apparently suffered a loss of cabin pressure at some point early in the flight. All on board are thought to have died of hypoxia, lack of oxygen. The plane, apparently still on autopilot, continued flying until one engine flamed out, most likely from fuel starvation. It crashed near Aberdeen, South Dakota after an uncontrolled descent. The exact cause of the pressurization failure and the reason behind the crew's failure or inability to respond to it have not been definitively determined.
- On 2 May 2000, a Learjet 35A carrying David Coulthard, experienced an engine failure and crashed near Lyon Satolas Airport, killing both pilots.
- On 24 October 2004, a Learjet 35A, N30DK, departed Brown Field's runway 08 at 00:23 after dropping a medical patient off, and was returning to Albuquerque. It climbed straight ahead and the SoCAL TRACON controller instructed the pilots to turn to a heading of 020 degrees, maintain VFR (visual flight rules), and expect their IFR clearance above 5,000 feet. The aircraft then entered a broken-to-overcast layer of clouds and crashed into the Otay Mountain at an altitude of 2300 feet, killing all 5 occupants.
- On 9 March 2006, Argentine Air Force Learjet 35A serial T-21 struck terrain and broke up shortly after takeoff from El Alto International Airport in La Paz, Bolivia killing all 6 on board. The Learjet was sent to Bolivia to deliver humanitarian aid.
- On 4 November 2007, a Learjet 35A crashed in São Paulo, Brazil, after a failed takeoff attempt. It destroyed a house in a residential area near the Campo de Marte Airport, killing the pilot, co-pilot and 6 family members who were in the house.
- On 24 June 2014, a Learjet 35A of the Gesellschaft für Flugzieldarstellung (GFD) was involved in a mid-air collision with a Eurofighter Typhoon of the German Air Force and crashed at Olsberg, Germany.
- On 9 November 2014, a private Learjet 36 crashed in Freeport, Grand Bahamas, Bahamas. The jet struck a shipping crane at the Grand Bahama Ship Yard, exploding on impact and crashing into the ground near a junkyard area. The plane was en route from the Lynden Pindling International Airport with nine people on board heading to Grand Bahama International Airport. All nine persons perished, including Myles Munroe, a Bahamian pastor.
- On 15 May 2017, Learjet 35A aircraft N452DA was on a repositioning flight from Philadelphia to Teterboro Airport in New Jersey, near New York City. The two pilots were killed after the aircraft stalled and crashed into a warehouse while circling to land. The NTSB investigation cited pilot error in continuing an unstable approach.
- On 27 December 2021, Learjet 35 aircraft N880Z was en route to Gillespie Field (KSEE) in El Cajon, California, near San Diego when it crashed onto a nearby street, killing all four occupants.
- On 1 July 2022, a medical flight Learjet 35A, registration LV-BPA, suffered an accident at the Río Grande Gob. Ramón Trejo Noel airport, in the Province of Tierra del Fuego, Antarctica and South Atlantic Islands, Argentina, killing all four occupants.
- On 1 November 2023, a Learjet 35A operating as an air ambulance overran runway 20 at Cuernavaca Airport in Morelos, Mexico, and went into a steep ravine, bursting into flames. The two pilots along with a passenger and a patient were killed.
- On 23 July 2024, a private Learjet 35, registration PP-EER, crashed inside an eucalyptus plantation, in Matupá, Brazil, killing the two crew members on board.

== Operators ==
=== Civilian operators ===
The Learjet 35 is operated by private, corporate and air taxi operators.

=== Military operators ===
Argentina

- Argentine Air Force - operates a single Learjet 35 as of December 2016.

Bolivia

- Bolivian Air Force

Brazil

- Brazilian Air Force - six in service as of December 2016.

Chile

- Chilean Air Force - two in service as of December 2015.

Finland

- Finnish Air Force - three in service as of December 2016.

Japan

- Japan Maritime Self Defense Force - 6 units overhauled from March 1986 to December 1993. 2 destroyed. Withdrawal on March 10, 2025.

Mexico

- Mexican Air Force

Namibia

- Namibian Air Force

Peru

- Peruvian Air Force - one Learjet 36 in service as of December 2016.

Saudi Arabia

- Royal Saudi Air Force

Switzerland

- Swiss Air Force

United Arab Emirates

- United Arab Emirates Navy

United States

- United States Air Force - 19 C-21A in service as of June 2019.
- United States Navy - Two Learjet 35/36s as of December 2016.

Uruguay

- Uruguayan Air Force - Operated one L-35A from 1981 to 1988.

Thailand

- Royal Thai Air Force

== Specifications (Learjet 36A) ==
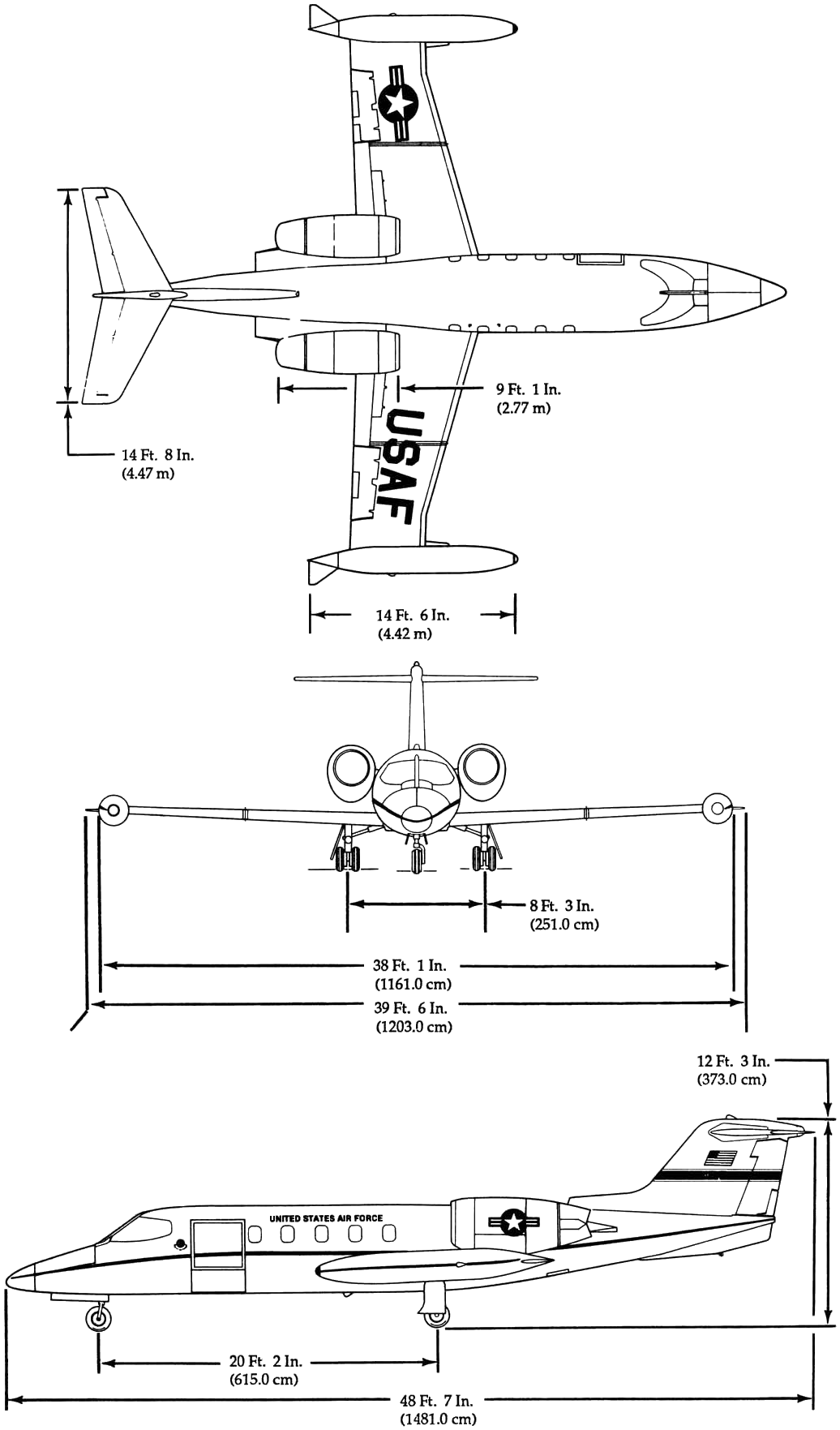
3-view line drawing of the Bombardier C-21A

Data from Jane's All The World's Aircraft 1980–81

General characteristics

- Crew: two (pilot and copilot)
- Length: 48 ft 8 in (14.83 m)
- Wingspan: 39 ft 6 in (12.04 m) (over tip tanks)
- Height: 12 ft 3 in (3.73 m)
- Wing area: 253.3 sq ft (23.53 m^{2})
- Aspect ratio: 5.74:1
- Airfoil: NACA 64A-109 (mod)
- Empty weight: 9,154 lb (4,152 kg)
- Max takeoff weight: 18,000 lb (8,165 kg)
- Fuel capacity: 1,110 US gal (920 imp gal; 4,200 L) usable fuel
- Powerplant: 2 × Garrett TFE731-2-2B turbofans, 3,500 lbf (16 kN) thrust each

Performance

- Maximum speed: 471 kn (542 mph, 872 km/h) at 25,000 ft (7,600 m)
- Cruise speed: 418 kn (481 mph, 774 km/h) at 45,000 ft (14,000 m) (econ. cruise)
- Stall speed: 96 kn (110 mph, 178 km/h) (wheels and flaps down)
- Range: 2,857 nmi (3,288 mi, 5,291 km) (4 passengers)
- Service ceiling: 45,000 ft (14,000 m)
- Rate of climb: 4,525 ft/min (22.99 m/s) at sea level
- Take-off run to 30 ft (9 m): 4,784 ft (1,458 m)
- Landing run from 50 ft (15 m): 2,884 ft (879 m)

== See also ==
Related lists

- List of active United States military aircraft
