= 179th Fighter Squadron =

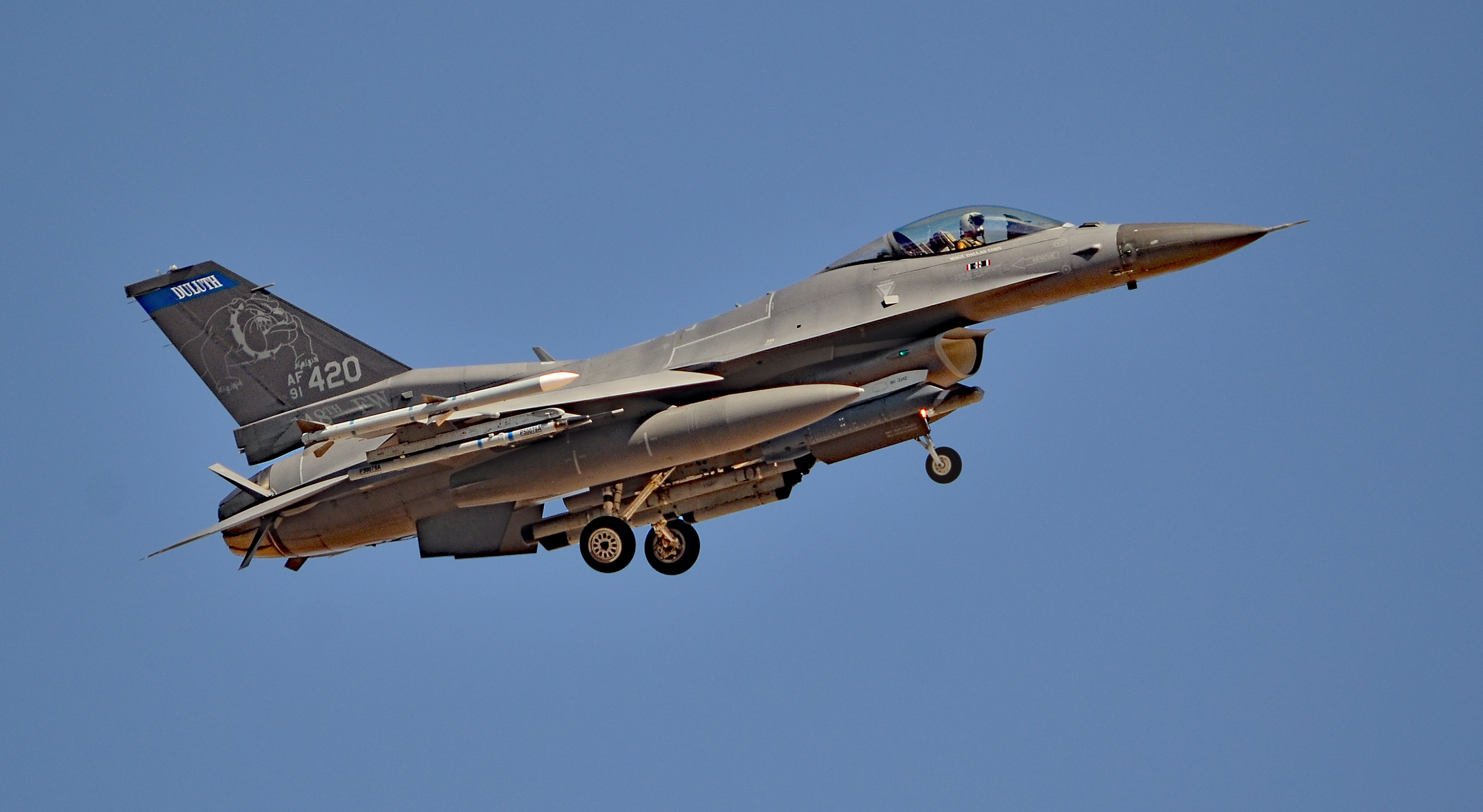
- 179th FS F-16CM landing at Nellis AFB, 2017.
- Active: 1943–1945; 1946–1952; 1952–present
- Country: United States
- Allegiance: Minnesota
- Branch: Air National Guard
- Type: Squadron
- Role: Fighter
- Part of: Minnesota Air National Guard
- Garrison/HQ: Duluth Air National Guard Base, Minnesota
- Nickname: Bulldogs
- Motto: Cave Canem (Latin for 'Beware of the Dog')
- Engagements: European Theater of Operations
- Decorations: Distinguished Unit Citation Air Force Outstanding Unit Award Belgian Fourragère

Insignia
- 179th Fighter Squadron emblem

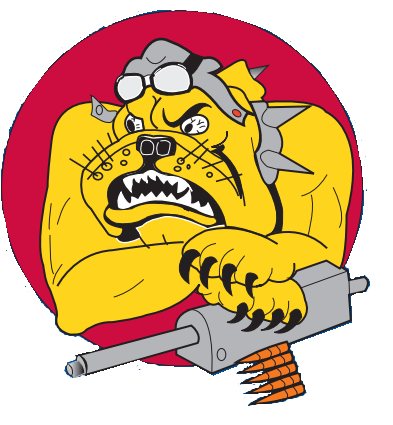
- 179th Fighter-Interceptor Squadron emblem
- Tail code: MN
- Tail stripe
- World War II Fuselage Code: 8L

The 179th Fighter Squadron is a unit of the Minnesota Air National Guard 148th Fighter Wing located at Duluth Air National Guard Base, Minnesota, United States. The 179th is equipped with the General Dynamics F-16C Fighting Falcon.

== History ==
=== World War II ===
==== Training in the United States ====
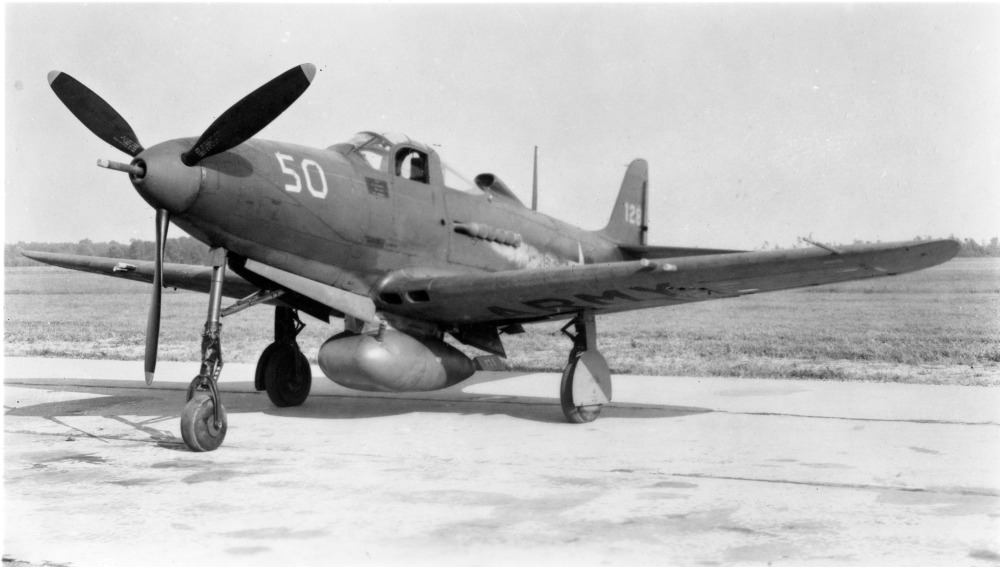
P-39D as used by the group for training

The squadron was first organized as the 393d Fighter Squadron at Hamilton Field, California, on 15 July 1943, as one of the original squadrons of the 367th Fighter Group. Several members of its initial cadre were former Flying Tigers with prior combat experience. It was not until late August, however, that the group received its first Bell P-39 Airacobra. After building up its strength, the squadron moved in October to Santa Rosa Army Air Field, California. In December group headquarters and the squadron moved to Oakland Municipal Airport, while the other squadrons of the group were at other locations in northern California. The squadron moved temporarily to Tonopah Army Air Field, Nevada, where it performed dive bombing and gunnery training. Training accidents with the Bell P-39 Airacobra cost several pilots their lives. In January 1944, as it prepared for overseas movement, the 393d was further reinforced with personnel from the 328th and 368th Fighter Groups. The squadron staged through Camp Shanks, and sailed for England aboard the SS Duchess of Bedford. The "Drunken Duchess" (Note: Nicknamed for its unusual rolling motion in heavy weather. Groh, p. 23.) docked at Greenock, Scotland on 3 April and the group was transported by train to its airfield at RAF Stoney Cross, England.

==== P-38 transition and combat operations from England ====
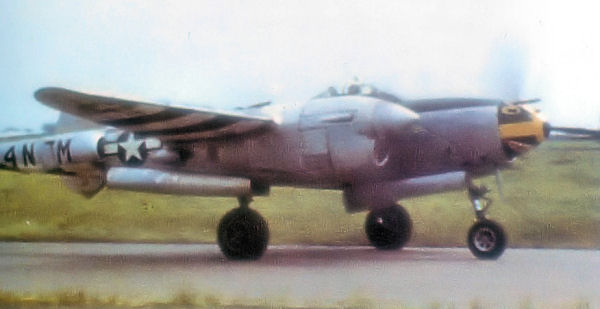
Lockheed P-38 Lightning of the 367th Fighter Group wearing D-Day invasion markings, June 1944.

Having trained on single engine aircraft, the squadrons's pilots were surprised to find Lockheed P-38 Lightnings sitting on Stoney Cross's dispersal pads. Only members of the advance party had any experience flying the Lightning. These pilots had flown combat sorties with the 55th Fighter Group. The change from single engine to twin engine aircraft required considerable retraining for both pilots and ground crew. Although some pilots entered combat with as little as eight hours of flying time on the P-38, in late April the squadron was reinforced by pilots who had trained on the Lightning in the States and were more experienced on the type. However, the lack of instrument training in the P-38 took its toll on the 393d as weather, not enemy action, caused the loss of pilots and airplanes.

On 9 May, the squadron flew its first combat mission, a fighter sweep over Alençon, France. For the remainer of the month, the unit flew fighter sweeps, bomber escort and dive bombing, missions and suffered its first combat losses.

On D-Day and the next three days the squadron flew missions maintaining air cover over shipping carrying invasion troops. These missions continued for the next three days. The 393d and other P-38 units stationed in England were selected for these missions with the expectation that the distinctive silhouette of the Lightning would prevent potential friendly fire incidents by anti-aircraft gunners mistaking them for enemy fighters. Shortly after the Normandy invasion, on 12 June, the 367th Group was selected to test the ability of the P-38 to carry a 2,000 lb bomb under each wing. The selected target was a railroad yard, and results were mixed. However, on this mission, the squadron scored its first air-to-air victory when Lts James Pinkerton and James Mason combined to shoot down a Messerschmitt Me 410 flying near the assigned target.

By mid June German ground forces had withdrawn to defend a perimeter around Cherbourg Harbour, a major port whose capture had become more important to the allies with the destruction of Mulberry A, one of the artificial harbors constructed near the Normandy beachhead. An attack by VII Corps on 22 June was to be preceded by low level bombing and strafing attack by IX Fighter Command. Briefed by intelligence to expect a "milk run" The 394th flew at low altitude through what turned out to be a heavily defended area. Within two to three minutes after beginning the attack the squadron lost five pilots. Seven group pilots were killed in action. Nearly all surviving aircraft received battle damage and the entire 367th Group was out of action for several days.

Ninth Air Force moved its medium bomber forces to bases closer to the Continent in July, so they would be able to strike targets near the expanding front in France. The 387th Bombardment Group was moved to Stoney Cross, forcing the 394th to vacate their station and move the short distance to RAF Ibsley. From Ibsley the group struck railroads, marshaling yards, and trains to prevent enemy reinforcements from reaching the front during Operation Cobra, the Allied breakthrough at Saint-Lô in July 1944.

===== Operations on the European Continent =====
Starting on 19 July, the 367th Group's forward echelon crossed the English Channel to take up stations in Normandy, France. Group headquarters shared Beuzeville Airfield with the 371st Fighter Group, while the 393d Squadron was at Cricqueville Airfield, advanced landing grounds made from pierced steel planking. After the breakout of ground forces in the Saint-Lô area, the squadron concentrated on close air support of General Patton's Third Army. In late August, the squadron attacked German Seventh Army convoys which, to prevent being surrounded, were withdrawing eastward from the Falaise pocket. Five convoys and 100 Tiger Tanks were destroyed on one day.

On 22 August the group attacked three Luftwaffe airfields near Laon. The 392d Fighter Squadron dive bombed and destroyed two hangars on one airfield but were jumped by twelve Focke-Wulf Fw 190s as they completed their attack. Eighteen Messerschmitt Bf 109s and Fw 190s engaged the 393d as it reformed from its dive bomb run. After bombing its target, the 394th Fighter Squadron turned to reinforce the 392d. The squadrons of the 367th Group claimed fourteen enemy aircraft in total against a loss of one Lightning.

The 393d received a Distinguished Unit Citation when it returned to the Laon area three days later. That day, the 367th Group attacked Luftwaffe airfields at Clastres, Péronne and Rosières-en-Haye through an intense flak barrage. The group then engaged more than thirty Focke-Wulf 190 fighters that had just taken off. Group claims were 25 enemy aircraft destroyed, one probably destroyed and 17 damaged against the loss of 6 group aircraft. (Note: These claims were from an estimated 50 enemy aircraft engaged in the air and on the ground. Chickering, p. 79.) Then, despite a low fuel supply, the unit strafed a train and convoy after leaving the scene of battle. Captain Larry Blumer of the 393d destroyed five enemy aircraft becoming an ace on one mission. In the afternoon the squadron conducted a long range fighter sweep of more than 800 miles to airfields in the Dijon-Bordeaux area.

As Allied forces moved forward across France the squadron began leap-frogging to new bases. In early September they relocated at Peray Airfield, but moved again a week later to Clastres Airfield. From Clastres The 393d supported Operation Market-Garden by escorting troop carrier aircraft and attacking flak positions. For its attacks that Fall, the squadron was cited in the Order of the Day by the Belgium Army.

In late October, as the Ninth Air Force brought its medium bombers to bases in France, the 393d was bumped from its station for the second time by the 387th Bombardment Group, when it moved to Juvincourt Airfield, north of Reims. Juvincourt was a former Luftwaffe base with permanent facilities, in contrast to the advanced landing grounds where the squadron had been based since moving to France. The squadron attacked German strong points to aid the Allied push against the Siegfried Line throughout the fall of 1944.

The German Ardennes Offensive occurred as the holidays approached. A planned move to a field in Belgium was canceled. During the Battle of the Bulge, the 394th, after escorting C-47s on a resupply drop to encircled troops at Bastogne, conducted an armed reconnaissance of the Trier area. The group was engaged by Fw 190s and a 40-minute air battle ensued in which the group claimed eight destroyed, two probably destroyed and nine damaged.

==== Transition to the P-47 Thunderbolt ====
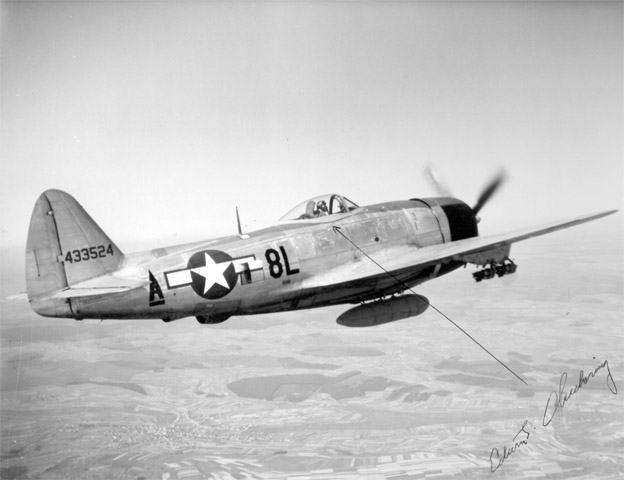
The P-47D (44-33524) of the Group commander, Col. Chickering, in 1945

Early in 1945 a desire to standardize the fighter-bombers in Ninth Air Force, the squadron transitioned into Republic P-47 Thunderbolts. Pilots flew Lightnings on combat missions while training at the same time with the Thunderbolt. The 393d was the first squadron of the 367th Group to fly a combat missions with the P-47s. Using the Thunderbolt the squadron was again cited in a Belgium Army Order of the Day, earning the Belgian Fourragere.

The 393d received a second Distinguished Unit Citation for action on 19 March 1945. The 367th Group's target was the headquarters of Field Marshal Kesselring, the German Commander-ln-Chief, West, (Note: Kesselring assumed command the day of the attack. American intelligence believed Field Marshall von Rundstedt was still in command. Groh, p. 136.) at Ziegenburg near Bad Nauheim, Germany. Aircraft of the leading 394th Fighter Squadron would attack at low level to achieve surprise, carrying a 1,000-pound bomb under each wing. The P-47s of the 392d Fighter Squadron would be similarly armed, but would dive bomb from a higher altitude. The bombs were equipped with time-delay fuses intended to crack the concrete roofs of the bunker. The 393d carried napalm intended to seep into the bunkers and burn what remained. The attack was scheduled for a time that intelligence reports indicated would find senior staff and commanders at lunch, the only time they would not be in the reinforced tunnels underneath the castle that housed the headquarters. The target was located in mountainous terrain well defended by antiaircraft artillery. Moreover, to avoid alerting the Germans to the pending attack, photographic reconnaissance aircraft had avoided the area, so detailed target photography was not available. The day of the attack the castle was concealed by ground haze which caused the 394th Fighter Squadron to stray off course at the last minute, preventing them from executing the attack as planned and reducing the element of surprise. Although senior German officers reached the underground bunkers and survived the attack, the group reduced the military complex to ruins, disrupting communications and the flow of intelligence at a critical time.

The squadron struck tanks, trucks, flak positions, and other objectives in support of the assault across the Rhine late in March and the final allied operations in Germany. It was commended by the commanding generals of XII Corps and the 11th Armored Division for the close air support the unit provided for their commands. On 10 April the squadron moved to Eschborn Airfield on the northwest side of Frankfurt, Germany. The 393d flew its last combat mission, a defensive patrol, one year after entering combat on 8 May. During its combat tour, the squadron was credited with 22.5 air-to-air victories over enemy aircraft.

==== Return to the United States and inactivation ====
All hostilities ceased the following day, exactly one year after the squadron became operational. On 4 June, the 367th Group led a flyby for General Weyland. On 1 July it was announced the 393d was to redeploy to the Pacific Theater after it was re-equipped with and trained with long range P-47Ns in preparation for Operation Downfall, the invasion of Japan. The squadron moved to Camp Detroit in France then to a staging area near Marseille. Here it boarded two ships, the USS General C. G. Morton, and the USNS John Ericsson (T-AO-194). When Japan surrendered, the Morton was diverted to Newport News, Virginia, while the Ericcson sailed for Staten Island, New York. Following leave for everyone, the few personnel that remained in the squadron after transfers and discharges reassembled at Seymour Johnson Field, North Carolina, on 2 November and the 393d was inactivated there on 7 November 1945.

=== Minnesota Air National Guard ===
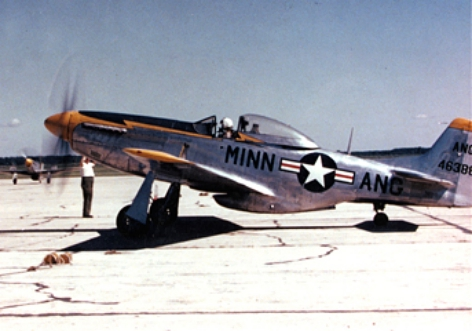
A Minnesota ANG F-51D Mustang in the early 1950s.

The wartime 393d Fighter Squadron was redesignated the 179th Fighter Squadron and was allotted to the National Guard on 24 May 1946. It was organized at Duluth Municipal Airport and was extended federal recognition on 17 September 1948. The squadron was equipped with North American F-51D Mustangs and was assigned to the 133d Fighter Group at Wold-Chamberlain Field, Minneapolis.

==== Korean War activation ====
On 1 March 1951, the 179th was federalized and brought to active duty due to the Korean War. Shortly after activation it was redesignated the 179th Fighter-Interceptor Squadron and became part of Air Defense Command. On active duty it assumed an air defense mission and initially remained assigned to the 133d Fighter-Interceptor Group at Duluth Municipal Airport. However, ADC experienced difficulty under the existing wing base organizational structure in deploying its fighter squadrons to best advantage. As a result, in February 1952 the 133d Group was inactivated and the squadron was reassigned to the 31st Air Division. The squadron was inactivated and returned to the control of the State of Minnesota on 1 December 1952.

==== Cold War ====
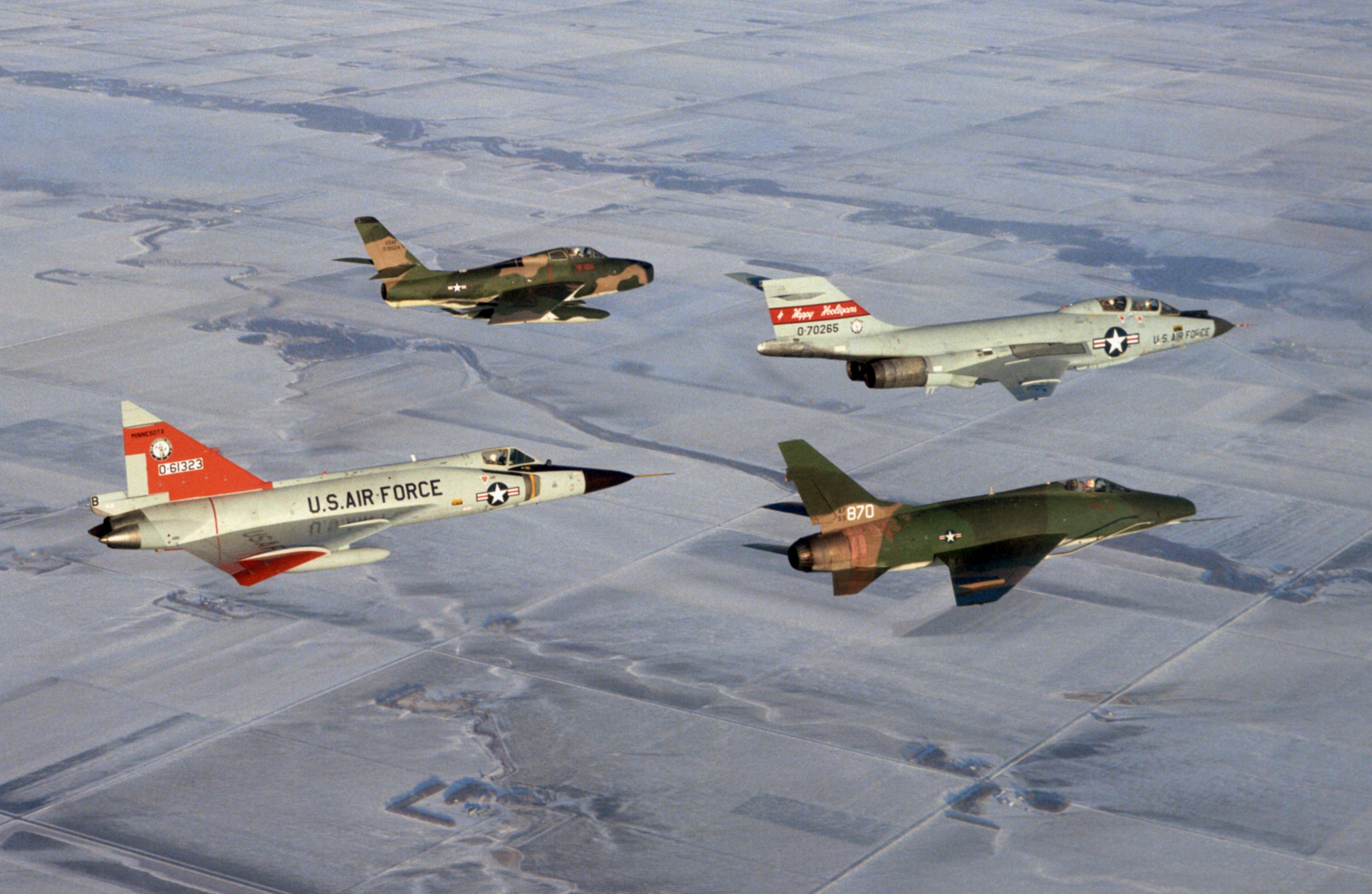
179th FIS Convair F-102 Delta Dagger 56-1323 alongside a F-84F Thunderstreak of the 170th TFS, an ANG F-100D Super Sabre and a F-101B Voodoo from the 178th FIS.

The unit was organized by 1 January 1953 and ADC became its gaining command upon call to active duty. It resumed its peacetime training mission. The squadron upgraded in 1954 to the radar equipped Lockheed F-94 Starfire all-weather interceptor, armed with .50 caliber machine guns. With this new aircraft, the 179th Fighter-Interceptor Squadron became an all-weather interceptor unit. In 1957, the 179th again upgraded to the improved Northrop F-89C Scorpion then in 1959, the unit converted to the F-89J model of the Scorpion, which was not only equipped with data link for interception control through the Semi-Automatic Ground Environment system, but which carried the nuclear armed AIR-2 Genie.

On 1 July 1960, the 179th was authorized to expand to a group level, and the 148th Fighter Group (Air Defense) was established along with supporting squadrons. The 179th became the new group's flying squadron. The other squadrons assigned to the group were the 148th Material Squadron, 148th Air Bse Squadron and the 148th USAF Dispensary. The same day, the squadron assumed a 24-hour air defense alert status at Duluth alongside the regular Air Force 11th Fighter-Interceptor Squadron.

In 1967, the supersonic Convair F-102A Delta Dagger replaced the squadron's F-89J. The McDonnell F-101B Voodoo came aboard in April 1971 and remained until January 1976 when the unit was redesignated, becoming the 179th Tactical Reconnaissance Squadron with McDonnell Douglas RF-4C Phantom II Mach-2 unarmed reconnaissance aircraft. Its new mission entailed all weather, high or low altitude, day or night, reconnaissance. This mission also required the unit to have the capability to deploy to a wide variety of operating locations. The 179th TRS deployed seven RF-4Cs to Erding Air Base in West Germany between 3 and 23 August 1979 as part of Exercise Coronet Bridle.

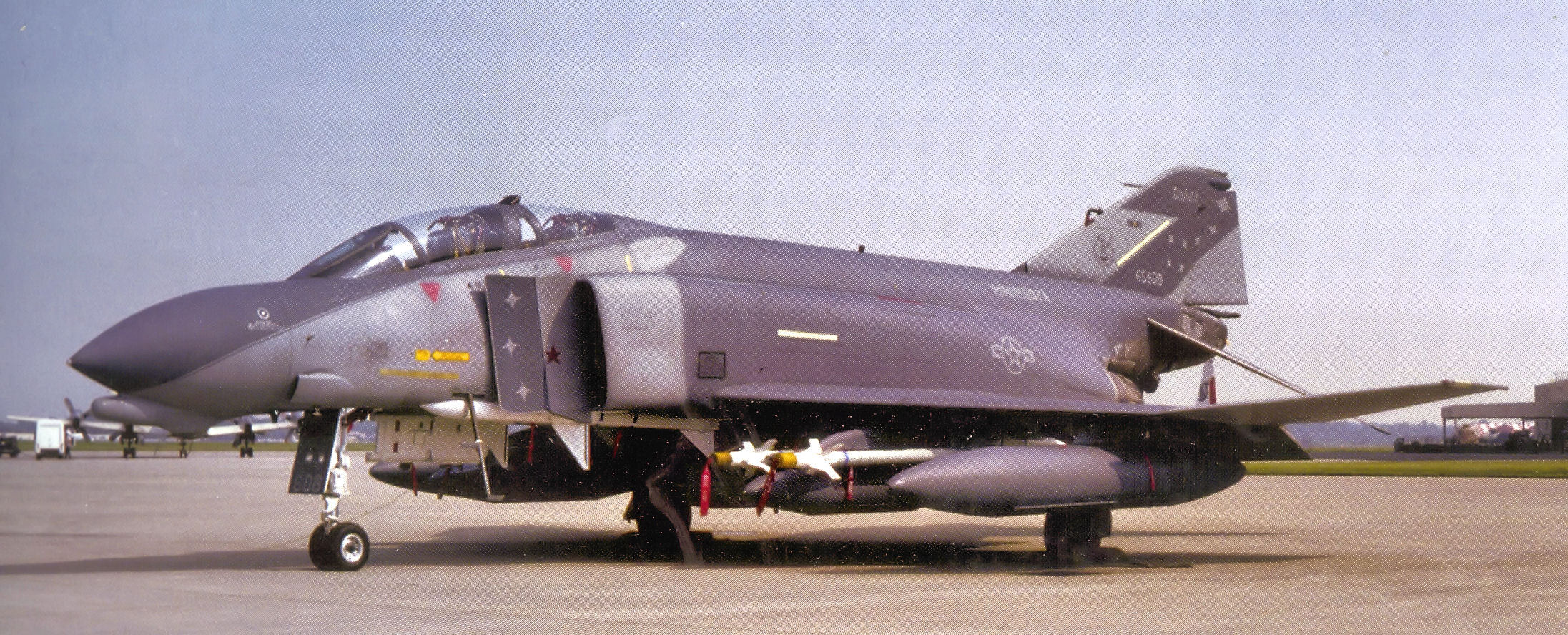
179th FIS McDonnell Douglas F-4D-26-MC Phantom II 65-0608 at Duluth Air National Guard Base, Minnesota, 1989. (This aircraft is today preserved at Duluth).

In October 1983, the mission changed again and the 179th returned to air defense becoming the 179th Fighter-Interceptor Squadron. The return to alert and air defense was accompanied by the McDonnell Douglas F-4D Phantom II tactical fighter, most of the unit's aircraft being veterans of the Vietnam War. Between 1 March 1986 and 6 April 1987, three F-4Ds (65-0585, 65-0593 and 65-0648) from the 179th FIS were deployed to Ramstein Air Base, West Germany, alongside Phantoms of the 178th FIS and 194th FIS as part of Exercise Creek Klaxon, which saw the ANG units take QRA responsibilities while the 526th TFS converted to the General Dynamics F-16C Fighting Falcon.

==== Post-Cold War ====
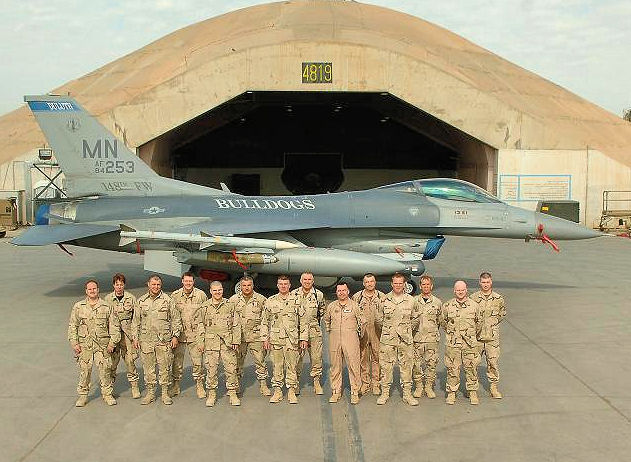
Airmen from the 148th in front of 179th EFS General Dynamics F-16C Block 25 Fighting Falcon 84-1253 at Balad AB, Iraq, on 20 March 2007.

On 10 March 1990, the 179th FIS received the first variants of the F-16A Fighting Falcon air defense fighter (ADF) to take over from the F-4D Phantom II. The early F-16 markings included "Duluth" on a tail stripe as well as an image of the Big Dipper. The last flight of a 179th FIS F-4D was under taken by 65-0608 on 17 April 1990. On 17 March 1992, the 179th was renamed the 179th Fighter Squadron. A few years later, in October 1995, the unit was tasked with maintaining a detachment (Detachment 1, 148th Fighter Wing), which maintained alert status at Tyndall Air Force Base, Florida.

To fit the needs of a shrinking air force, the squadron dropped the air superiority role and became a general purpose tactical fighter squadron. Already proficient in the air-to-air mission, the 179th had to be brought up to speed with both using guided and unguided bombs. Live bombs were dropped for the first time in March 2000 during a training exercise. Due to the role change, the squadron's base facilities also had to be renovated.

On 11 September 2001, the squadron became very busy as a result of the attack on the two World Trade Center towers in New York City. As an immediate aftermath, the 148th was again tasked with air defense, providing combat air patrols over the capital and New York City, and with deploying personnel and aircraft back to its detached alert facility at Tyndall.

Towards the end of 2003 the Bulldogs began conversion to the F-16C/D block 25. Most F-16A/Bs were retired straight to the Aerospace Maintenance and Regeneration Center. During the course of the conversion, Detachment 1 at Tyndall was discontinued. With the newer Fighting Falcons, the squadron began combat deployments, sometimes operating as an expeditionary fighter squadron. As part of Operation Iraqi Freedom, the 179th was one of the first F-16 units to be based in Balad Air Base, Iraq. The 179th deployed more than 200 personnel between April and June 2005. The squadron was tasked with both air-to-air and air-to-ground combat operations. Another deployment to Balad was set up between September and December 2008.

On 27 April 2010, the squadron began another conversion being the first Air National Guard unit to operate the block 50 F-16C/D when five aircraft arrived from Spangdahlem Air Base, Germany when 22d and 23d Fighter Squadrons at Spangdahlem were replaced by the 480th Fighter Squadron, with the surplus aircraft going to the 179th. The majority of the block 25s were sent to retirement at Davis-Monthan Air Force Base, Arizona.

Between April and July 2016, the 179th deployed to Osan Air Base, South Korea, as the 179th Expeditionary Fighter Squadron, being replaced by the 157th Fighter Squadron. The 179th EFS deployed to Southwest Asia as part of Operation Inherent Resolve between April and August 2018, flying nearly 3,500 hours across over 600 sorties. From 1 to 12 April 2019, the 179th FS deployed to Leeuwarden Air Base in the Netherlands to participate in Exercise Frisian Flag 2019.

== Lineage ==
- Constituted as the 393d Fighter Squadron on 26 May 1943

Activated on 15 July 1943
Inactivated on 7 November 1945

- Redesignated 179th Fighter Squadron and allotted to the National Guard on 24 May 1946

Extended federal recognition on 17 September 1948
Federalized and placed on active duty on 1 March 1951
Redesignated 179th Fighter-Interceptor Squadron on 23 March 1951
Inactivated and returned to Minnesota state control on 1 December 1952
Activated on 1 December 1952
Redesignated 179th Tactical Reconnaissance Squadron on 10 January 1976
Redesignated 179th Fighter-Interceptor Squadron on 15 November 1983
Redesignated 179th Fighter Squadron on 17 March 1992

=== Assignments ===
- 367th Fighter Group, 15 July 1943 – 7 November 1945
- 133d Fighter Group (later 133d Fighter-Interceptor Group), 17 September 1948
- 31st Air Division, 6 February 1952
- 133d Fighter-Interceptor Group, 1 December 1952
- 133d Air Defense Wing, 1 April 1958
- 148th Fighter Group (later 148th Tactical Reconnaissance Group, 148th Fighter-Interceptor Group, 148th Fighter Group), 1 July 1960
- 148th Operations Group, 11 October 1995 – Present

=== Stations ===
- Hamilton Field, California, 15 July 1943
- Santa Rosa Army Air Field, California, 11 October 1943
- Oakland Municipal Airport, California, 10 December 1943 – 8 March 1944
- RAF Stoney Cross (AAF-452), England, 5 April 1944
- RAF Ibsley (AAF-347), England, 6 July 1944
- Beuzeville Airfield (A-6), France, 22 July 1944
- Cricqueville Airfield (A-2), France, 14 August 1944
- Peray Airfield (A-44), France, 4 September 1944
- Clastres Airfield (A-71), France, 8 September 1944
- Juvincourt Airfield (A-68), France, 28 October 1944
- St-Dizier Airfield (A-64), France, 1 February 1945
- Conflans Airfield (A-94), France, 14 March 1945
- Eschborn Airfield (Y-74), Germany, 20 April – July 1945
- Seymour Johnson Field, North Carolina, September-7 November 1945
- Duluth Municipal Airport (later Duluth International Airport, Duluth Air National Guard Base), Minnesota, 17 September 1948 – present

=== Aircraft ===
- Bell P-39 Airacobra, 1943–1944
- Lockheed P-38 Lightning, 1944–1945
- Republic P-47N Thunderbolt, 1945
- North American F-51D Mustang, 1948–1954
- Lockheed F-94B Starfire, 1954–1957
- Northrop F-89C Scorpion, 1957–1959
- Northrop F-89J Scorpion, 1959–1966
- Convair F-102A Delta Dagger, 1966–1971
- McDonnell F-101B Voodoo, 1971–1976
- McDonnell Douglas RF-4C Phantom II, 1976–1983
- McDonnell Douglas F-4D Phantom II, 1983–17 April 1990
- General Dynamics F-16A/B Fighting Falcon, 10 March 1990 – 2002
- General Dynamics F-16C/D Fighting Falcon, 2002 – present

=== Awards ===
- Air Force Outstanding Unit Award
- Winston P. Wilson Award (Outstanding Air National Guard All Weather Interceptor Unit): 1957
- Ricks Trophy for excellence: 1967
- First place in the William Tell Weapons Competition: 1970
- Raytheon Trophy (formerly the Hughes Trophy) Best Fighter Unit in the United States Air Force: Four times, most recently 2009

== See also ==
- F-89 Scorpion units of the United States Air Force
- F-94 Starfire units of the United States Air Force
- General Dynamics F-16 Fighting Falcon operators
- List of United States Air Force fighter squadrons
- List of United States Air National Guard squadrons
- McDonnell Douglas F-4 Phantom II non-U.S. operators
