= 394th Fighter Squadron =

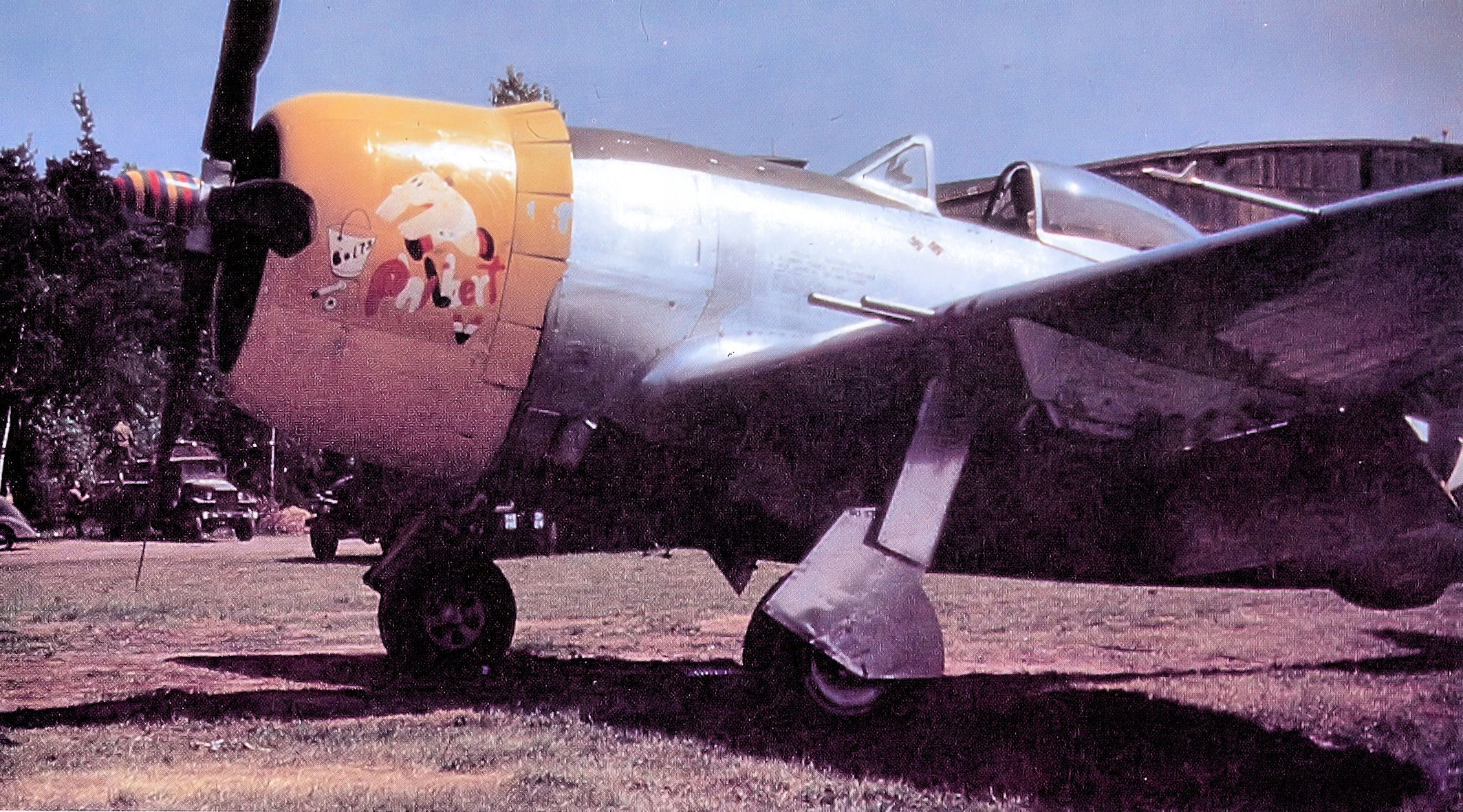
- 394th Fighter Squadron P-47D Thunderbolt
- Active: 1943–1945
- Country: United States
- Branch: United States Army Air Forces
- Role: Fighter
- Engagements: European Theater of Operations
- Decorations: Distinguished Unit Citation; Belgian Fourragere

Insignia
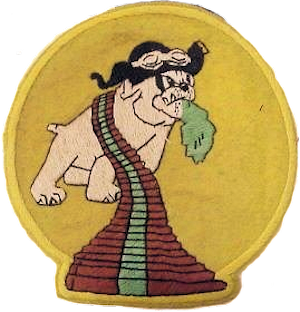
- 394th Fighter Squadron emblem (Approved 25 February 1944)
- Fuselage Code: 4N

The 394th Fighter Squadron is an inactive United States Air Force unit. It was assigned to the 367th Fighter Group and was last stationed at Seymour Johnson Field, North Carolina, where it was inactivated on 7 November 1945.

The squadron was activated on 15 July 1943 at Hamilton Field, California. It trained with Bell P-39 Airacobra fighters at bases in California and Nevada before shipping to the European Theater of Operations in March 1944. Upon arrival in England, the squadron was equipped with Lockheed P-38 Lightnings. It entered combat in early May and flew missions from England until July, when it moved to Normandy. In August, the squadron was awarded a Distinguished Unit Citation for its attacks on Luftwaffe airfields near Laon.

The squadron converted to Republic P-47 Thunderbolts in January 1945 and, with the new fighter, earned a second Distinguished Unit Citation for an attack on the headquarters of the Wehrmacht High Command of the West in March. The Belgian government also awarded the squadron the Belgian Fourragere for its support of operations in Belgium. Although scheduled to move to the Pacific theater in August 1945, with the surrender of Japan, the squadron returned to the United States, where it was inactivated.

== History ==
=== Training in the United States ===
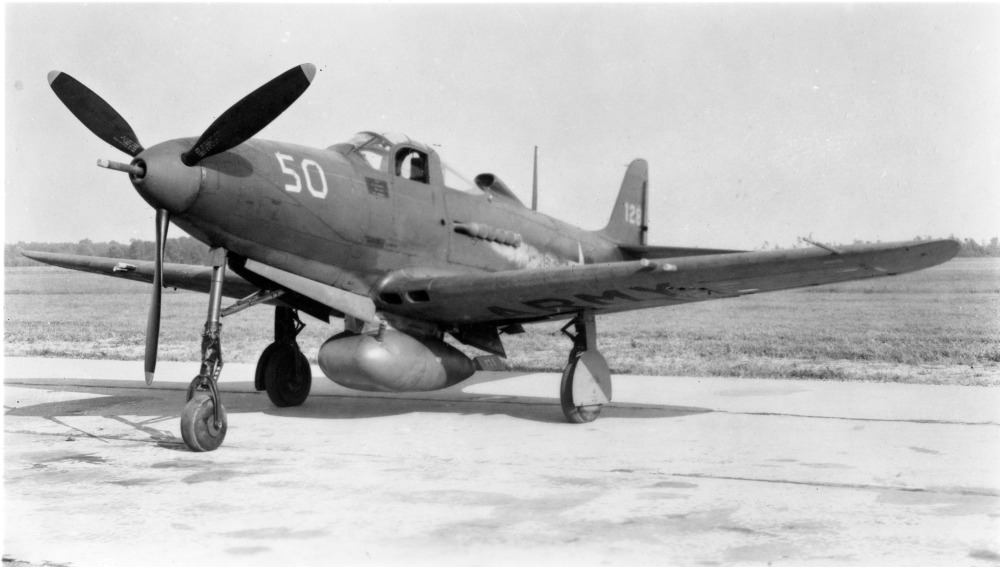
P-39D as used by the group for training

The squadron was first organized as the 394th Fighter Squadron at Hamilton Field, California on 15 July 1943, as one of the original squadrons of the 367th Fighter Group. Several members of its initial cadre were former Flying Tigers with prior combat experience. It was not until late August, however, that the group received its first Bell P-39 Airacobra. After building up its strength, the squadron moved in October to Santa Rosa Army Air Field, California. In December group headquarters moved to Oakland Municipal Airport, while the 394th was at Hayward Army Air Field. The squadron moved temporarily to Tonopah Army Air Field, Nevada, where it performed dive bombing and gunnery training. Training accidents with the Bell P-39 Airacobra cost several pilots their lives. In January 1944, as it prepared for overseas movement, the 394th was beefed up with personnel from the 328th and 368th Fighter Groups. The squadron staged through Camp Shanks, and sailed for England aboard the SS Duchess of Bedford. The "Drunken Duchess" (Note: Nicknamed for its unusual rolling motion in heavy weather. Groh, p. 23.) docked at Greenock, Scotland on 3 April and the group was transported by train to its airfield at RAF Stoney Cross, England.

=== P-38 transition and combat operations from England ===
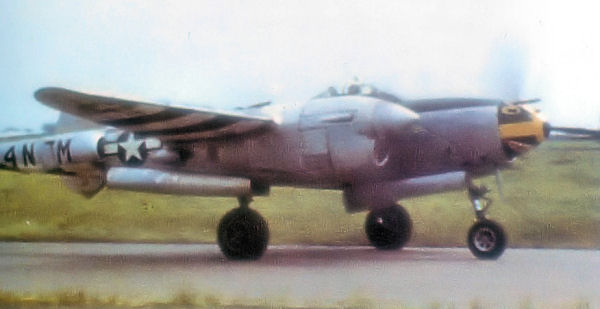
Lockheed P-38 Lightning of the 394th Fighter Squadron wearing D-Day invasion markings, June 1944.

Having trained on single engine aircraft, the squadrons's pilots were surprised to find Lockheed P-38 Lightnings sitting on Stoney Cross's dispersal pads. Only members of the advance party had any experience flying the Lightning. These pilots had flown combat sorties with the 55th Fighter Group. The change from single engine to twin engine aircraft required considerable retraining for both pilots and ground crew. Although some pilots entered combat with as little as eight hours of flying time on the P-38, in late April the squadron was reinforced by pilots who had trained on the Lightning in the States and were more experienced on the type. However, the lack of instrument training in the P-38 took its toll on the 394th as weather, not enemy action, caused the loss of pilots and airplanes.

On 9 May, the squadron flew its first combat mission, a fighter sweep over Alençon. For the remainer of the month, the unit flew fighter sweeps, bomber escort and dive bombing, missions and suffered its first combat losses.

On D-Day and the next three days the squadron flew missions maintaining air cover over shipping carrying invasion troops. These missions continued for the next three days. The 394th and other P-38 units stationed in England were selected for these missions with the expectation that the distinctive silhouette of the Lightning would prevent potential friendly fire incidents by anti-aircraft gunners mistaking them for enemy fighters. Shortly after the Normandy invasion, on 12 June, the 367th Group was selected to test the ability of the P-38 to carry a 2,000 lb bomb under each wing. The selected target was a railroad yard, and results were mixed.

By mid June German ground forces had withdrawn to defend a perimeter around Cherbourg Naval Base, a major port whose capture had become more important to the allies with the destruction of Mulberry A, one of the artificial harbors constructed near the Normandy beachhead. An attack by VII Corps on 22 June was to be preceded by low level bombing and strafing attack by IX Fighter Command. Briefed by intelligence to expect a "milk run" The 394th flew at low altitude through what turned out to be a heavily defended area. Within two to three minutes after beginning the attack the squadron lost five pilots. Seven group pilots were killed in action. Nearly all surviving aircraft received battle damage and the entire 367th Group was out of action for several days.

Ninth Air Force moved its medium bomber forces to bases closer to the Continent in July, so they would be able to strike targets near the expanding front in France. The 387th Bombardment Group was moved to Stoney Cross, forcing the 394th to vacate their station and move the short distance to RAF Ibsley. From Ibsley the group struck railroads, marshaling yards, and trains to prevent enemy reinforcements from reaching the front during the Allied breakthrough at Saint Lo in July 1944.

=== Operations on the European continent ===
Starting on 19 July, the 367th Group's forward echelon crossed the English Channel to take up stations in Normandy. Group headquarters and the 394th shared Beuzeville Airfield with the 371st Fighter Group, an advanced landing ground made from pierced steel planking. (Note: Maurer gives the location of the 394th as Sainte-Mère-Église, but this is the same airfield (A-6) called Beuzeville elsewhere. Maurer, Combat Squadrons, pp. 484–485, Groh, p. 59.) After the breakout of ground forces in the Saint-Lô area, the squadron concentrated on close air support of General Patton's Third Army. In late August, the squadron attacked German Seventh Army convoys which, to prevent being surrounded, were withdrawing eastward from the Falaise pocket. Five convoys and 100 Tiger Tanks were destroyed on one day.

On 22 August the group attacked three Luftwaffe airfields near Laon. The 392d Fighter Squadron dive bombed and destroyed two hangars on one airfield but were jumped by twelve Focke-Wulf Fw 190s as they completed their attack. Eighteen Messerschmitt Bf 109s and Fw 190s engaged the 393d Fighter Squadron as it reformed from its dive bomb run. After bombing its target, the 394th Squadron turned to reinforce the 392d. The squadrons of the 367th Group claimed fourteen enemy aircraft in total against a loss of one Lightning. This combat was the first in which the 394th had been able to score an aerial victory over an enemy fighter.

The 394th received a Distinguished Unit Citation when it returned to the Laon area three days later. That day, the 367th Group attacked Luftwaffe airfields at Clastres, Péronne and Rosières-en-Haye through an intense flak barrage. The group then engaged more than thirty Focke-Wulf 190 fighters that had just taken off. Group claims were 25 enemy aircraft destroyed, one probably destroyed and 17 damaged against the loss of 6 group aircraft. (Note: These claims were from an estimated 50 enemy aircraft engaged in the air and on the ground. Chickering, p. 79) Then, despite a low fuel supply, the unit strafed a train and convoy after leaving the scene of battle. In the afternoon the squadron conducted a long range fighter sweep of more than 800 miles to airfields in the Dijon-Bordeaux area.

As Allied forces moved forward across France the squadron began leap-frogging to new bases. In early September they relocated at Peray Airfield, but moved again a week later to Clastres Airfield. From Clastres The 394th supported Operation Market-Garden by escorting troop carrier aircraft and attacking flak positions. For its attacks that fall, the squadron was cited in the Order of the Day by the Belgium Army.

In late October, as Ninth Air Force brought its medium bombers to bases in France, the 394th was bumped from its station for the second time by the 387th Bombardment Group, when it moved to Juvincourt Airfield (A-68), north of Reims. Juvincourt was a former Luftwaffe base with permanent facilities, in contrast to the advanced landing grounds where the squadron had been based since moving to France. The squadron attacked German strong points to aid the Allied push against the Siegfried Line throughout the fall of 1944.

The German Ardennes Offensive occurred as the holidays approached. A planned move to a field in Belgium was canceled. During the Battle of the Bulge, the 394th, after escorting C-47s on a resupply drop to encircled troops at Bastogne, conducted an armed reconnaissance of the Trier area. The squadron was engaged by Fw 190s and a 40-minute air battle ensued in which the group claimed eight destroyed, two probably destroyed and nine damaged.

=== Transition to the P-47 Thunderbolt ===
Early in 1945 desire to standardize the fighter-bombers in Ninth Air Force, the squadron transitioned into Republic P-47 Thunderbolts. Pilots flew Lightnings on combat missions while training at the same time with the Thunderbolt. Using the Thunderbolt the squadron was again cited in a Belgium Army Order of the Day, earning the Belgian Fourragere.

The 394th received a second Distinguished Unit Citation for action on 19 March 1945. The 367th Group's target was the headquarters of Field Marshal Kesselring, the German Commander-ln-Chief, West, (Note: Kesselring assumed command the day of the attack. American intelligence believed Field Marshall von Rundstedt was still in command. Groh, p. 136.) at Ziegenburg near Bad Nauheim, Germany. The 394th would lead the attack at low level to achieve surprise, carrying a 1,000-pound bomb under each wing. The P-47s of the 392d Fighter Squadron would be similarly armed, but would dive bomb from a higher altitude. The bombs were equipped with time-delay fuses intended to crack the concrete roofs of the bunker. The 393rd Fighter Squadron carried napalm intended to seep into the bunkers and burn what remained. The attack was scheduled for a time that intelligence reports indicated would find senior staff and commanders at lunch, the only time they would not be in the reinforced tunnels underneath the castle that housed the headquarters. The target was located in mountainous terrain well defended by antiaircraft artillery. Moreover, to avoid alerting the Germans to the pending attack, photographic reconnaissance aircraft had avoided the area, so detailed target photography was not available. The day of the attack the castle was concealed by ground haze which caused the 394th squadron to stray off course at the last minute, preventing them from executing the attack as planned and reducing the element of surprise. Instead, the 392nd fighter squadron lead the attack, scoring direct hits on the castle. Although senior German officers reached the underground bunkers and survived the attack, the group reduced the military complex to ruins, disrupting communications and the flow of intelligence at a critical time.

The squadron struck tanks, trucks, flak positions, and other objectives in support of the assault across the Rhine late in March and the final allied operations in Germany. It was commended by the commanding generals of XII Corps and the 11th Armored Division for the close air support the unit provided for their commands. On 10 April the squadron moved to Eschborn Airfield on the northwest side of Frankfurt, Germany. The 394th flew its last combat mission, a defensive patrol, one year after entering combat on 8 May. During its combat tour, the squadron was credited with 23 air-to-air victories over enemy aircraft.

=== Return to the United States and inactivation ===
All hostilities ceased the following day, exactly one year after the squadron became operational. On 4 June, the 367th Group led a flyby for General Weyland. On 1 July it was announced the 394th was to redeploy to the Pacific Theater of Operations after it was re-equipped with and trained with long range P-47Ns in preparation for Operation Downfall, the invasion of Japan. The squadron moved to Camp Detroit in France then to a staging area near Marseille. Here it boarded two ships, the USS General C. G. Morton, and the USNS John Ericsson (T-AO-194). When Japan surrendered, the Morton was diverted to Newport News, Virginia while the Ericcson sailed for Staten Island, New York. Following leave for everyone, the few personnel that remained in the squadron after transfers and discharges reassembled at Seymour Johnson Field, North Carolina on 2 November, and the 394th was inactivated there on 7 November 1945.

== Lineage ==
- Constituted as the 394th Fighter Squadron on 26 May 1943

Activated on 15 July 1943
Inactivated on 7 November 1945

=== Assignments ===
- 367th Fighter Group, 15 July 1943 – 7 November 1945

=== Stations ===
- Hamilton Field, California, 15 July 1943
- Santa Rosa Army Air Field, California, 11 October 1943
- Hayward Army Air Field, California, 8 December 1943 – 8 March 1944
- RAF Stoney Cross (AAF-452), England, 4 April 1944
- RAF Ibsley (AAF-347), England, 6 July 1944
- Beuzeville Airfield (A-6), France, 22 July 1944
- Cricqueville Airfield (A-2), France, 15 August 1944
- Peray Airfield (A-44), France, 5 September 1944
- Clastres Airfield (A-71), France, 11 September 1944
- Juvincourt Airfield (A-68), France, 27 October 1944
- St-Dizier Airfield (A-64), France, 3 February 1945
- Conflans Airfield (A-94), France, 15 March 1945
- Eschborn Airfield (Y-74), Germany, 11 April
- Camp Detroit, France, c. 15 July 1945 – c. 26 August 1945
- Seymour Johnson Field, North Carolina, September-7 November 1945

=== Aircraft ===
- Bell P-39 Airacobra, 1943–1944
- Lockheed P-38 Lightning, 1944–1945
- Republic P-47 Thunderbolt, 1945

=== Awards and campaigns ===
Award streamer	Award	Dates	Notes
	Distinguished Unit Citation	25 August 1944	
	Distinguished Unit Citation	19 March 1945	
	Belgian Fourragere	6 June – 30 September 1944; 16 December 1944 – 25 January 1945	

Campaign Streamer	Campaign	Dates	Notes
	Air Offensive, Europe	8 May 1944 – 5 June 1944	
	Normandy	6 June 1944 – 24 July 1944	
	Northern France	25 July 1944 – 14 September 1944	
	Rhineland	15 September 1944 – 21 March 1945	
	Ardennes-Alsace	16 December 1944 – 25 January 1945	
	Central Europe	8 May 1944 – 21 May 1945	
	Air Combat, EAME Theater	8 May 1944 – 11 May 1945	

== See also ==
- List of Lockheed P-38 Lightning operators
