= RAF Ibsley =

Former Royal Air Force station in Hampshire, England

RAF Ibsley USAAF Station AAF-347
- Near Ibsley, Hampshire in England
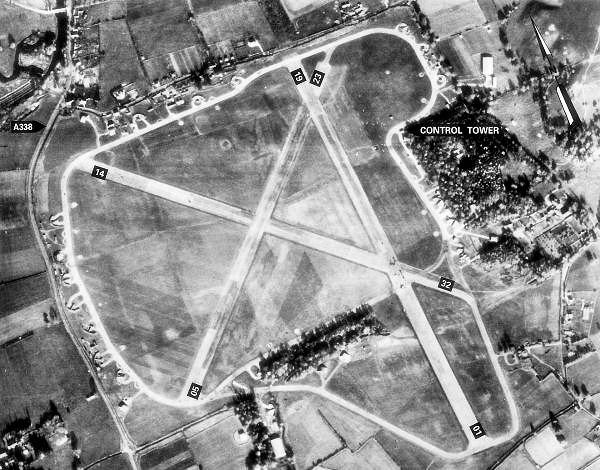
- Aerial Photo of Ibsley Airfield, January 1944. Note the runway extension to the 01 runway at the south side of the airfield, with the perimeter track extension.

Site information
- Type: Royal Air Force station
- Code: IB
- Owner: Air Ministry
- Operator: Royal Air Force; United States Army Air Forces; 1942 & 1944
- Controlled by: RAF Fighter Command; 1941-42 & 1942-44 & 1944-45 * No. 10 Group RAF * No. 11 Group RAF; RAF Transport Command; 1945-47 * No. 46 Group RAF; Ninth Air Force

Location
- Shown within Hampshire RAF Ibsley (the United Kingdom)
- Coordinates: 50°52′46″N 001°46′50″W

Site history
- Built: 1940/41
- In use: February 1941 - 1947
- Battles/wars: European theatre of World War II

Airfield information
- Elevation: 24 metres (79 ft) AMSL
Runways
Direction	Length and surface
01/19	1,320 metres (4,331 ft) Grass
05/23	1,140 metres (3,740 ft) Grass
14/32	1,000 metres (3,281 ft) Grass

Royal Air Force Ibsley or more simply RAF Ibsley is a former Royal Air Force station in Hampshire, England. The airfield is near the village of Ibsley, about 2 miles (3 km) north of Ringwood.

A perimeter track with three runways were laid out and 18 fighter pens allowing 46 fighters to stand in relative safety. Twelve Blister, and two Bellman hangars, were built and ten dispersed accommodation sites were laid out to the north for the airmen and women. A double cupola Battle Head Quarters, two Control Towers (one small and one large).

== History ==
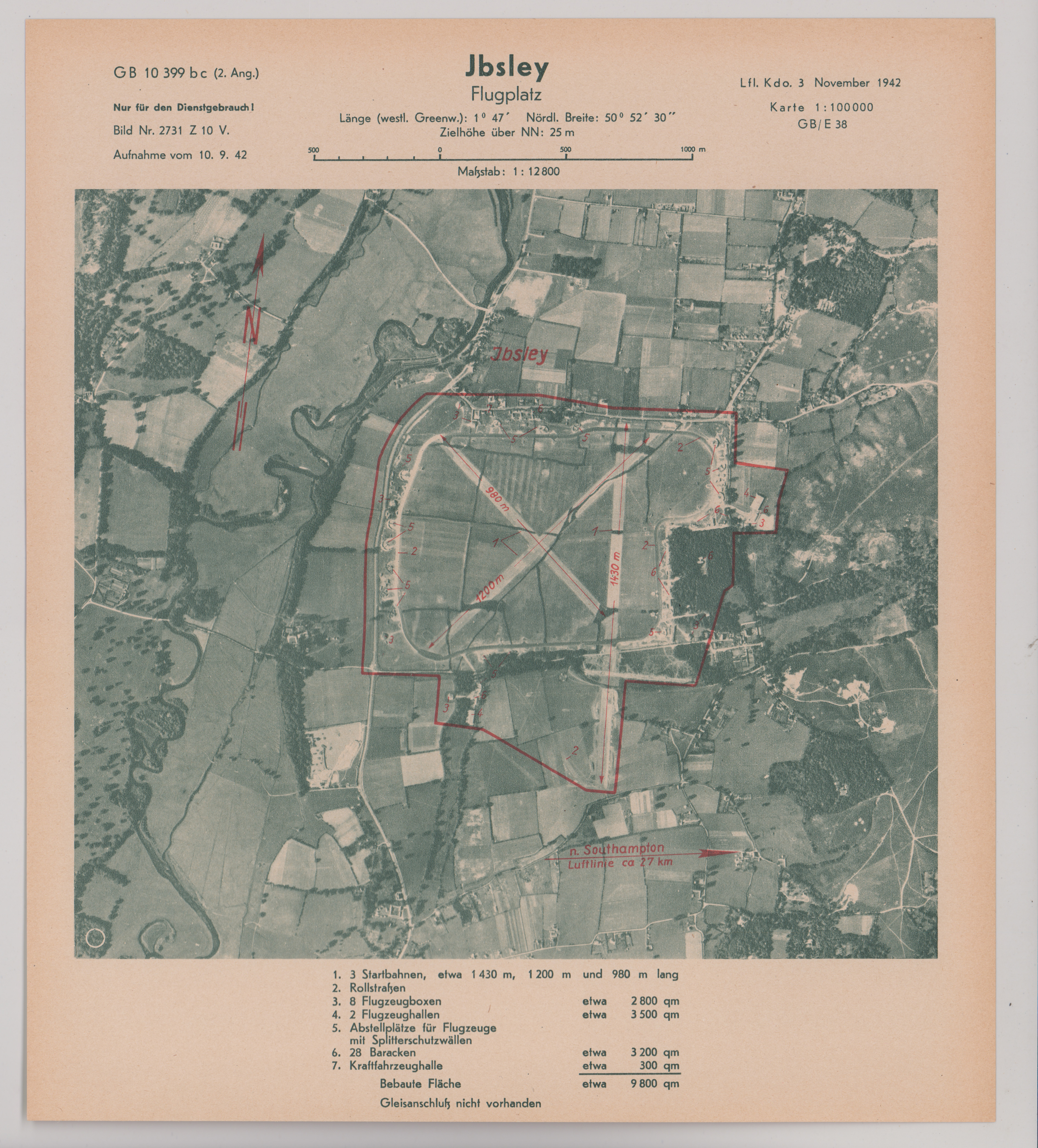
RAF Ibsley on a target dossier of the German Luftwaffe, 1942

=== Royal Air Force ===
Ibsley was built between 1940 and early 1941 (opening in February of 1941), and was 2 miles (3.2 km) north of Ringwood. Parts of the base had been built on Ibsley Common, including blast walls, a bunker and some accommodation blocks. The airfield was initially used by No. 32 Squadron RAF with Hawker Hurricanes, followed by No. 118 Squadron RAF with Supermarine Spitfires.

In 1941 it was used as a location for the film The First of the Few.

The following units were here at some point:

- No. 32 Squadron RAF (1941)
- No. 66 Squadron RAF (1942-43)
- No. 118 Squadron RAF (1942-43)
- No. 124 (Baroda) Squadron RAF
- No. 129 (Mysore) Squadron RAF (1943)
- No. 165 (Ceylon) Squadron RAF (1943)
- No. 170 Squadron RAF
- No. 175 Squadron RAF
- No. 234 (Madras Presidency) Squadron RAF (1941-42)
- No. 257 (Burma) Squadron RAF
- No. 263 (Fellowship of the Bellows) Squadron RAF (1943-44)
- No. 268 Squadron RAF
- No. 302 Polish Fighter Squadron (1941)
- No. 310 (Czechoslovak) Squadron RAF (1943)
- No. 312 (Czechoslovak) Squadron RAF (1943-44)
- No. 313 (Czechoslovak) Squadron RAF (1944)
- No. 421 Squadron RCAF (1942)
- No. 453 Squadron RAAF (1943)
- No. 501 (County of Gloucester) Squadron AAF (1942)
- No. 504 (County of Nottingham) Squadron AAF (1942-43)
- No. 587 Squadron RAF
- No. 616 (South Yorkshire) Squadron AAF (1943)
- No 7 Flying Instructors School RAF
- No. 16 Casualty Air Evacuation Unit RAF
- No. 17 Casualty Air Evacuation Unit RAF
- No. 21 Sector RAF
- No. 134 (Czech) Airfield RAF
- No. 147 (Night Fighter) Wing RAF
- No. 150 Staging Post RAF
- No. 160 Staging Post RAF
- No. 200 Staging Post RAF
- No. 201 Staging Post RAF
- No. 302 (Transport) Wing RAF
- No. 2763 Squadron RAF Regiment
- No. 2772 Squadron RAF Regiment
- No. 2800 Squadron RAF Regiment
- No. 2888 Squadron RAF Regiment
- No. 4043 Anti-Aircraft Flight RAF Regiment
- Glider Pick-up Training Flight RAF

Ibsley was also used, for short periods, in 1942 and 1944, by the United States Army Air Forces.

=== United States Army Air Forces use ===
Ibsley was known as USAAF Station AAF-347 for security reasons by the USAAF during the war, and by which it was referred to instead of location. Its USAAF Station Code was "IB".

USAAF Station Units assigned to RAF Ibsley were:

- 327th Service Group

329th and 79th Service Squadrons; HHS 327th Service Group

- 21st Weather Squadron
- 32nd Mobile Reclamation and Repair Squadron
- 3rd Radio Squadron
- 40th Mobile Communications Squadron
- 83rd Airdrome Squadron
- 98th Station Complement Squadron
- Headquarters & Headquarters Squadron (70th Fighter Wing)

Regular Army Station Units included:

- 555th Signal Aircraft Warning Battalion
- 692nd Quartermaster Battalion
- 926th Signal Battalion
- 1113th Signal Company
- 1180th Quartermaster Company
- 1292nd Military Police Company
- 1829th Ordnance Supply & Maintenance Company
- 2200th Quartermaster Truck Company
- 332nd Signal Company
- 807th Chemical Company (Air Operations)
- 878th Signal Depot Company
- 900th Signal Depot Company

==== 1st Fighter Group ====
The first USAAF unit to use Ibsley was the Eighth Air Force 1st Fighter Group, equipped with Lockheed P-38 Lightnings. The 1st FG arrived from RAF Goxhill on 24 August 1942. Tactical squadrons of the group and squadron fuselage codes were:

- 27th Fighter Squadron (HV)
- 71st Fighter Squadron (LM)
- 94th Fighter Squadron (UN)

The stay of the 1st FG was short, being assigned to Twelfth Air Force for duty in the Mediterranean theater in support of the Operation Torch North African landings.

On 16 October 1943 RAF Ibsley was allocated to the Ninth Air Force.

==== 48th Fighter Group ====
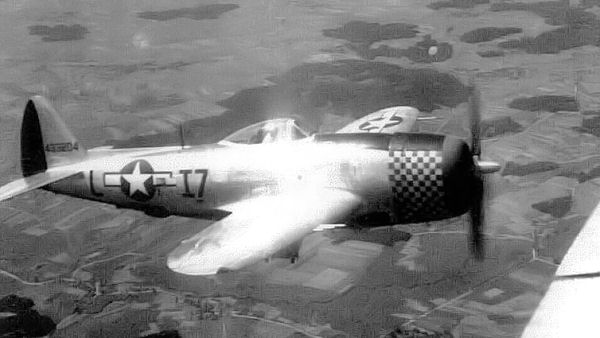
Republic P-47D-30-RA Thunderbolt Serial 44-33204 of the 493d Fighter Squadron

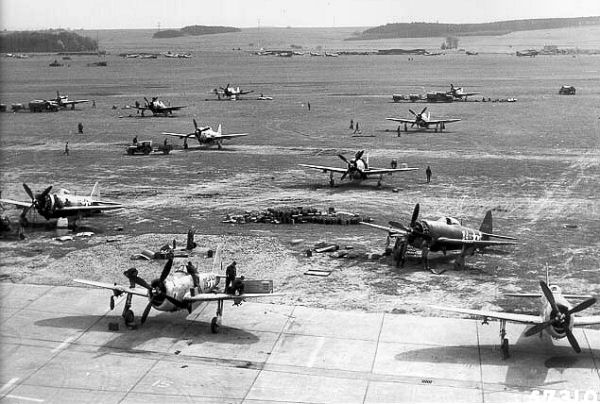
P-47Ds of the 48th Fighter Group at an advanced landing ground

With construction completed, on 29 March 1944 the Ninth Air Force 48th Fighter Group arrived at Ibsley from Waterboro AAF, South Carolina (32.921817°N 80.633297°W). The 48th flew the Republic P-47 Thunderbolt and had the following fighter squadrons and fuselage codes:

- 492d Fighter Squadron (F4)
- 493d Fighter Squadron (I7)
- 494th Fighter Squadron (6M)

The 48th was a group of Ninth Air Force's 70th Fighter Wing, IX Tactical Air Command. Ibsley continued to be used by the 48th FG until 4 July when the last personnel left.

==== 367th Fighter Group ====
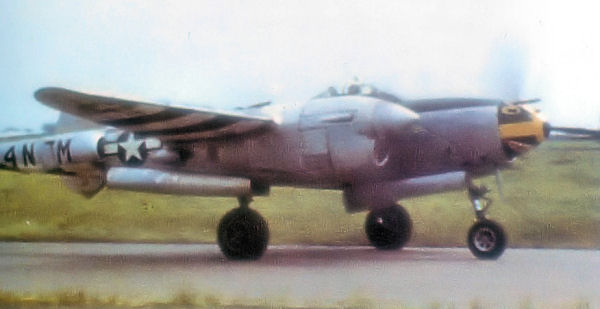
Lockheed P-38 Lightning of the 394th Fighter Squadron wearing D-Day invasion markings, June 1944

Arriving on the heels of the departing 48th FG, the 367th Fighter Group arrived at Ibsley on 6 July 1944 from RAF Stoney Cross. The 367th flew Lockheed P-38 Lightnings. Tactical squadrons of the group and squadron fuselage codes were:

- 392d Fighter Squadron (H5)
- 393d Fighter Squadron (8L)
- 394th Fighter Squadron (4N)

The 367th was a group of Ninth Air Force's 70th Fighter Wing, IX Tactical Air Command. The 392d and 393d and 394th Fighter Squadrons went to Carentan (ALG A-10), Cretteville (ALG A-14) and Reuxeville (ALG A-6) respectively.

== Current use ==
Today the airfield consists mostly of a series of gravel pits and large landscaped lakes. One lake is overlooked by the derelict, windowless control tower. Planning permission for the Landmark Trust to restore and repurpose this building as holiday accommodation was approved in 2026. A very small section of the end of runway 01 still exists south of Ellingham Drove at the southern part of the airfield.

A small memorial is located near the control tower 50°52′45″N 001°46′34.00″W.

== See also ==
- List of former Royal Air Force stations
