= 70th Fighter Wing =

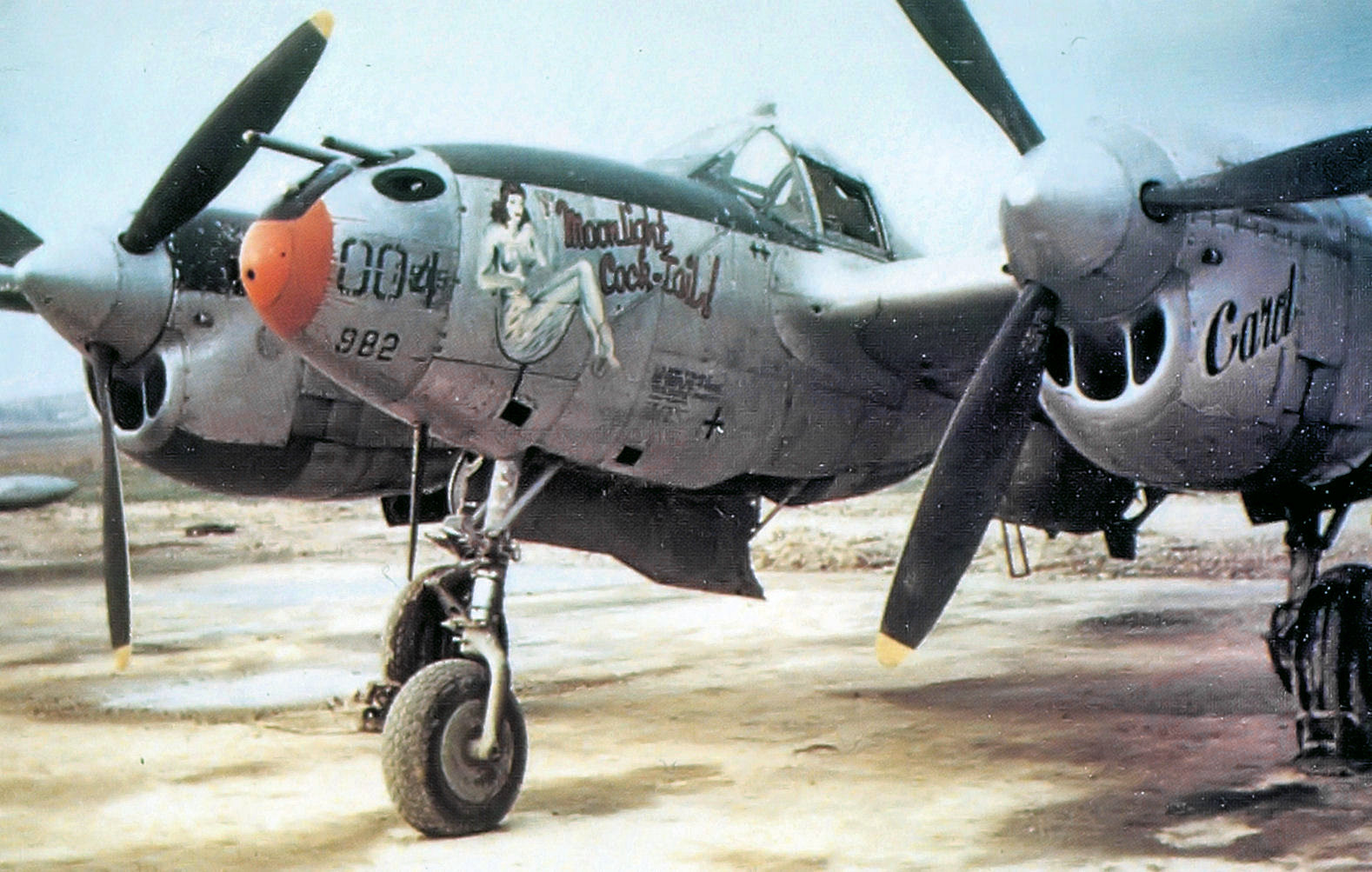
- 367th Fighter Group Lockheed P-38G-10-LO Lightning 42-12982
- Active: 1943–1947
- Country: United States
- Branch: United States Army Air Forces
- Role: Fighter (Command & Control)
- Part of: United States Air Forces in Europe

The 70th Fighter Wing (70th FW) is an inactive United States Air Force unit. Its last assignment was with the United States Air Forces in Europe, based at Neubiberg Air Base, Germany. It was inactivated on 25 September 1947.

== History ==
Established and organized at Paine Field, Washington in 1943 as a command and control organization. Deployed to the European Theater of Operations (ETO) in late 1943 and assigned to IX Fighter Command, Ninth Air Force. Initial Mission of the Wing was to receive operational orders from Headquarters, IX Fighter Command and direct subordinate groups in attacking enemy targets in Occupied France and the Low Countries in preparation for the Normandy Invasion in June 1944. Targets included bridges, roads, railroads and enemy interceptor aircraft both on the ground as well as in air-to-air combat.

After the D-Day invasion, was reassigned to IX Tactical Air Command (IX TAC) and directed to provide ground support for advancing United States First Army forces in France, attacking enemy targets initially in the Cotentin Peninsula, then supported Operation Cobra, the breakout of Normandy and attacked enemy forces in the Falaise-Argentan Gap. Wing headquarters and subordinate units operated primarily from liberated airfields and newly built temporary Advanced Landing Grounds in France, moved into north-central France, its groups attacking enemy targets near Paris then north-west into Belgium and the southern Netherlands. In December 1944/January 1945, engaged enemy targets on the north side of the Battle of the Bulge, then moved eastward into the Northern Rhineland as part of the Western Allied invasion of Germany.

Supported First Army as it crossed the Rhine River at Remagen then moved north to attack ground targets in the Ruhr, providing air support as Allied ground forces encircled enemy forces in the Ruhr Pocket, essentially ending organized enemy resistance in Western Germany. First Army halted its advance at the Elbe River in late April 1945, the wing engaging targets of opportunity in enemy-controlled areas until combat was ended on 5 May 1945.

Remained in Europe after the war as part of United States Air Forces in Europe, performing occupation duty and the destruction or shipment to the United States of captured enemy combat equipment. Assigned units also performed air defense duty over the American Zone of Occupation. Inactivated in Germany on 25 September 1947.

=== Operations and decorations ===
- Combat Operations: Combat in European Theater of Operations (ETO), 29 November 1943-May 1945.
- Campaigns: Air Offensive, Europe; Normandy; Northern France; Rhineland; Ardennes-Alsace; Central Europe
- Decorations: Cited in the Order of the Day, Belgian Army: 6 Jun – 30 Sep 1944; 16 Dec 1944 – 25 Jan 1945. Belgian Fourragere.

=== Lineage ===
- Constituted as 70th Fighter Wing on 11 August 1943

Activated on 15 August 1943
Inactivated on 25 September 1947

=== Assignments ===
- IX Fighter Command, 29 November 1943 – 3 October 1944
- IX Tactical Air Command, 3 October 1944 – 2 December 1945
- United States Air Forces in Europe

XII Tactical Air Command, 2 December 1945 – 25 September 1947

=== Units assigned ===
- 354th Fighter Group: (P-51 Mustang), 2 December 1943 – 15 April 1944
- 358th Fighter Group: (P-47 Thunderbolt), 1 October 1944 – 16 January 1945

Attached to: IX Tactical Air Command, entire period

- 362d Fighter Group: (P-38 Lightning), 13 April – 1 August 1944

Attached to: IX Air Support Command, entire period

- 363d Fighter Group: (P-38 Lightning), 23 December 1943 – 1 August 1944

Attached to: IX Air Support Command, entire period

- 365th Fighter Group: (P-47 Thunderbolt), 22 December 1943 – 1 August 1944

Attached to: IX Air Support Command, entire period

- 367th Fighter Group: (P-38 Lightning), 6 July 1944 – 16 January 1945

Attached to: IX Air Support (later, IX Tactical Air) Command, 3 October 1944 – 16 January 1945

- 368th Fighter Group: (P-47 Thunderbolt), 1 October 1944 – 16 January 1945

Attached to: IX Tactical Air Command, entire period

- 370th Fighter Group: (P-47 Thunderbolt), 1 October 1944 – 1 February 1945

Attached to: IX Tactical Air Command, entire period

- 474th Fighter Group: (P-38 Lightning), 1 August 1944 – 6 December 1945

Attached to: IX Tactical Air Command, 1 August 1944 – 21 November 1945

=== Bases assigned ===
- Paine Field, Washington, 15 August – 8 November 1943
- RAF Greenham Common (USAAF Station 486), England, 29 November 1943
- RAF Boxted (AAF-150), England, 6 December 1943
- RAF Ibsley (AAF-347), England, 17 April – June 1944
- Cricqueville-en-Bessin Airfield (A-2), France, 9 June 1944
- Villedieu-les-Poêles, France, 4 August 1944
- Le Teilleul, France, 16 August 1944
- Aillières-Beauvoir, France, 22 August 1944
- Versailles, France, 31 August 1944
- Marchais-en-Brie, France, 10 September 1944
- Liège Airfield, Belgium (A-93), 3 October 1944
- Verviers, Belgium, 22 January 1945
- Brühl, Germany, 18 March 1945
- Bad Wildungen, Germany, 30 May 1945
- Fürstenfeldbruck Air Base, Germany, 28 July 1945
- Neubiberg Airdrome, Germany, 10 November 1945 – 25 September 1947
