= 133d Operations Group =

United States Air Force unit

133rd Operations Group
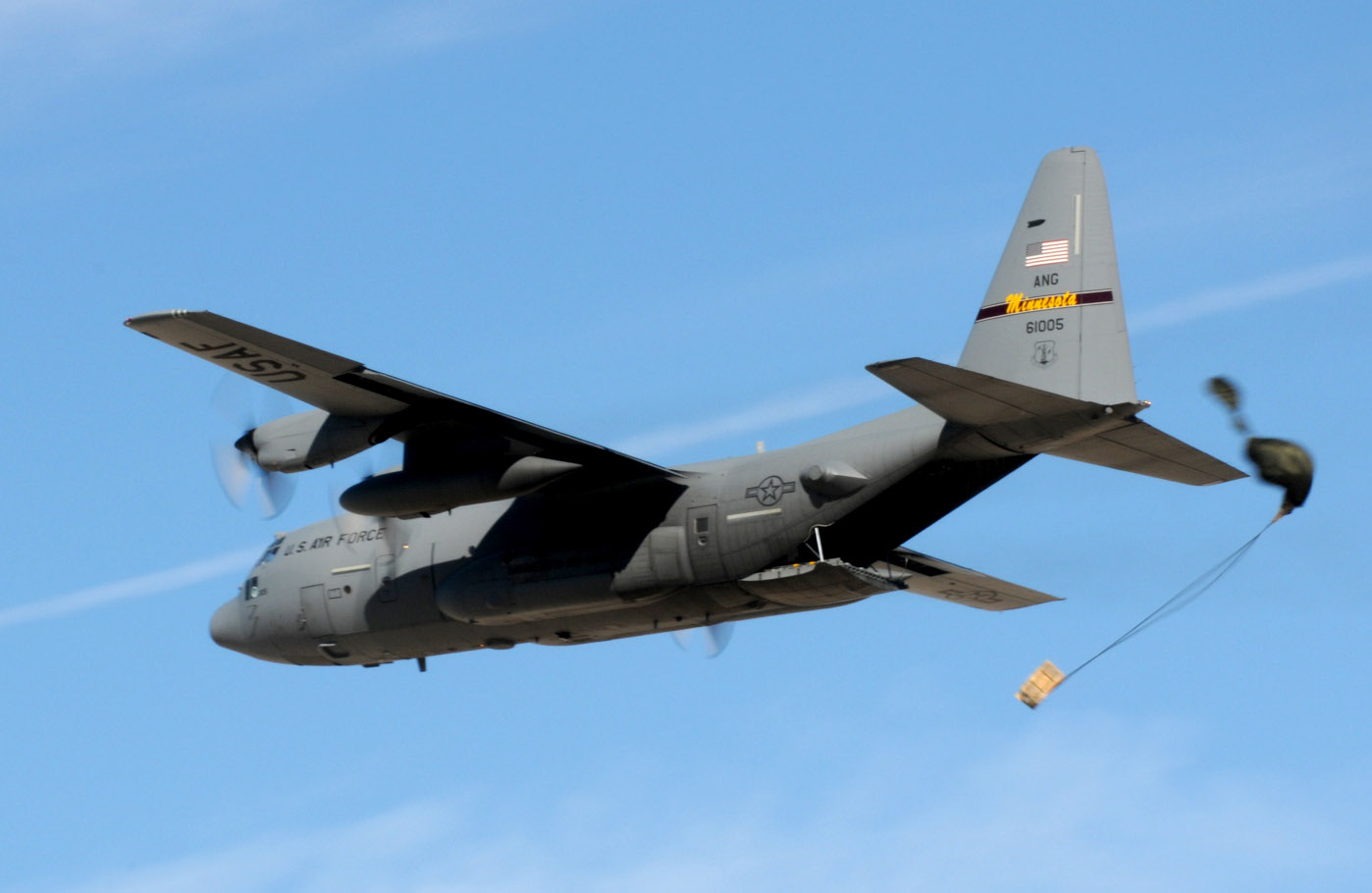
- 133rd Operations Group C-130H
- Active: 1943–1945; 1947–1952; 1952–present
- Country: United States
- Branch: Air National Guard
- Role: Airlift
- Patron: Splendentes in Defensione Latin Splendid in Defense
- Engagements: European Theater of Operations
- Decorations: Distinguished Unit Citation; Belgian Fourragere; Air Force Outstanding Unit Award

Commanders
- Current commander: Col Peter Ament
- Notable commander: Brig Gen Edwin S. Chickering (commander from November 1944 until inactivation)

Insignia
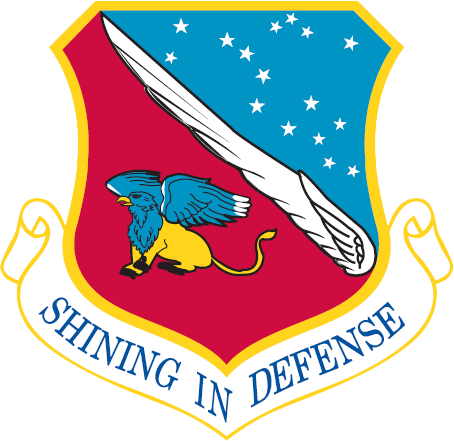
- 133d Operations Group emblem (Approved 9 July 1954) (Note: The group uses the wing emblem with the group designation on the scroll. Air Force Instruction 84–105, Organizational Lineage, Honors and Heraldry, 19 March 2013, para 3.3.3.)

The 133rd Operations Group is the flying component of the Minnesota Air National Guard's 133rd Airlift Wing, stationed at Minneapolis–Saint Paul Joint Air Reserve Station, Minnesota. If activated to federal service, the group is gained by Air Mobility Command of the United States Air Force.

The group was first activated as the 367th Fighter Group, an Army Air Forces unit. The group trained in the western United States with Bell P-39 Airacobras. The 367th moved to England in the spring of 1944, where it became part of IX Fighter Command (later XIX Tactical Air Command) and converted to Lockheed P-38 Lightnings. The group engaged in combat with Lightnings, and later with Republic P-47 Thunderbolts, in the European Theater of Operations until VE Day, earning two Distinguished Unit Citations and the Belgian Fourragere for its actions. It returned to the United States in the fall of 1945 and was inactivated on 7 November 1945.

In May 1946, the group was allotted to the National Guard and renumbered as the 133d Fighter Group. (Note: United States National Guard units are traditionally numbered between 101 and 300.) It trained with North American P-51 Mustangs. In 1951 it was mobilized for the Korean War and served in an air defense role until inactivating in February 1952 in a reorganization of Air Defense Command.

The group was returned to the Minnesota Air National Guard in December 1952. It was an air defense fighter unit until 1960, when it converted to the Boeing C-97 Stratofreighter and the airlift mission. It was called to active duty during the Berlin Crisis of 1961. The 133d replaced its C-97s with Lockheed C-130 Hercules aircraft in 1971. It was inactivated in early 1975, when its component units were assigned directly to its parent 133d Tactical Airlift Wing. It was reactivated in 1994 and resumed its role as the operational component of the 133d Wing.

== Mission ==
The group commands units that support federal and state requirements for the airlift of troops, cargo, and medical patients anywhere in the world. It performs missions tasked by other headquarters within its capabilities. It monitors standardization of all flying and support unit operating procedures and insures units maintain an environment conducive to safe training activities.

== History ==
=== World War II ===
==== Training in the United States ====
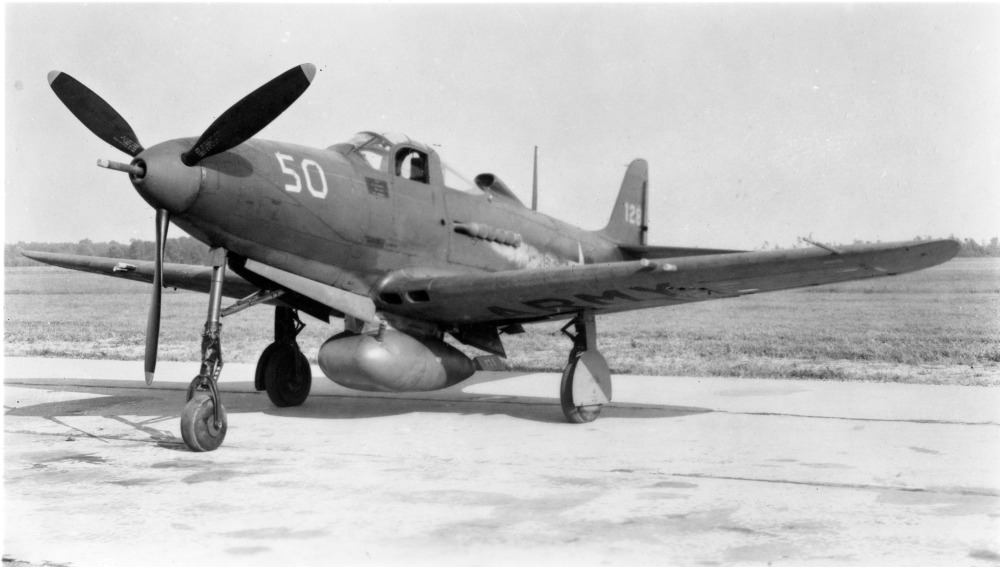
P-39D as used by the group for training

The 367th Fighter Group was first activated at Hamilton Field, California on 15 July 1943 with the 392d, 393d and 394th Fighter Squadrons as its initial components. Several members of its initial cadre were former Flying Tigers with prior combat experience. It was not until late August, however, that the group received its first Bell P-39 Airacobra. After building up its strength, the group moved in October to Santa Rosa Army Air Field, California. In December the group moved to Oakland Municipal Airport, while its squadrons moved to separate fields in northern California. (Note: The 392d was at Sacramento Municipal Airport, the 394th at Hayward Army Air Field, while the 393d was with the group in Oakland. Maurer, Combat Squadrons, pp. 481–485.) The squadrons moved temporarily in sequence to Tonopah Army Air Field, Nevada, where they performed dive bombing and gunnery training. Training accidents with the Airacobra cost eight pilots their lives. In January 1944, as it prepared for overseas movement, the 367th was beefed up with personnel from the 328th and 368th Fighter Groups. The group staged through Camp Shanks, and sailed for England aboard the SS Duchess of Bedford. The "Drunken Duchess" (Note: Nicknamed for its unusual rolling motion in heavy weather. Groh, p. 23.) docked at Greenock, Scotland on 3 April and the group was transported by train to its airfield at RAF Stoney Cross, England.

==== P-38 transition and combat operations from England ====
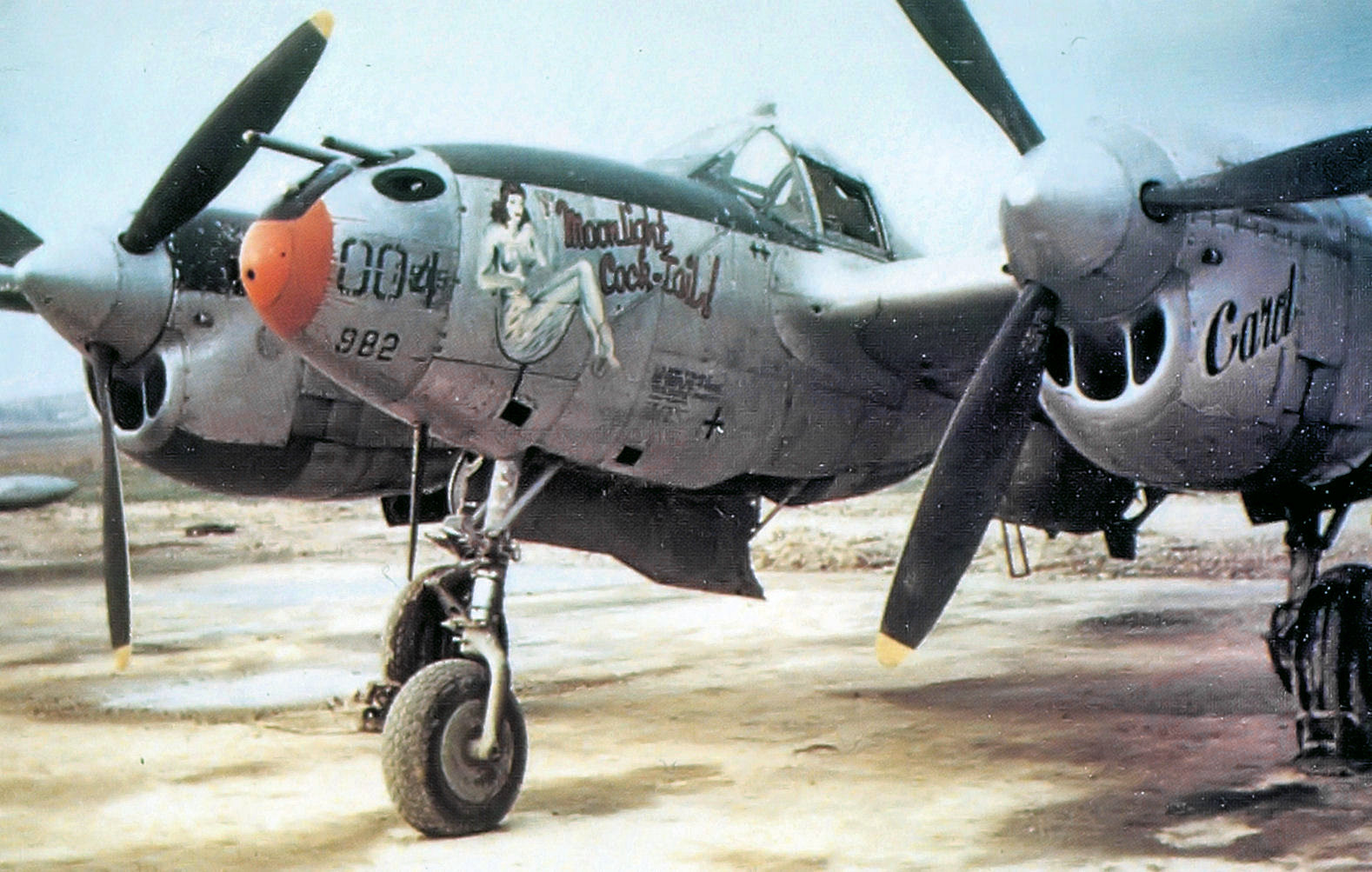
392d Fighter Squadron P-38 (Note: Aircraft is Lockheed P-38G-10-LO Lightning, serial 42-12982)

Having trained on single engine aircraft, the group's pilots were surprised to find Lockheed P-38 Lightnings sitting on Stoney Cross's dispersal pads. Only four group pilots, members of the advance party, had any experience flying the Lightning. These pilots had flown combat sorties with the 55th Fighter Group. The change from single engine to twin engine aircraft required considerable retraining for both pilots and ground crew. Although some pilots entered combat with as little as eight hours of flying time on the P-38, in late April the group was reinforced by fourteen pilots who had trained on the Lightning in the States and were more experienced on the type. However, the lack of instrument training in the P-38 took its toll on the group as weather, not enemy action, caused the loss of pilots and airplanes.

On 9 May, the group flew its first combat mission, a fighter sweep over Alençon. For the remainder of the month, the group flew fighter sweeps, bomber escort and dive bombing, missions and suffered its first combat losses.

On D-Day and the next three days the group flew nine missions maintaining air cover over shipping carrying invasion troops. These missions continued for the next three days. The 367th and other P-38 groups stationed in England were selected for these missions with the expectation that the distinctive silhouette of the Lightning would prevent potential friendly fire incidents by anti-aircraft gunners mistaking them for enemy fighters. Shortly after the Normandy invasion, on 12 June, the group was selected to test the ability of the P-38 to carry a 2,000 lb bomb under each wing. The selected target was a railroad yard, and results were mixed. However, on this mission, the group scored its first air-to-air victory when Lts James Pinkerton and James Mason teamed up to shoot down a Messerschmitt Me 410 flying near the assigned target.

By mid June German ground forces had withdrawn to defend a perimeter around Cherbourg, a major port whose capture had become more important to the allies with the destruction of Mulberry A, one of the artificial harbors constructed near the Normandy beachhead. An attack by VII Corps on 22 June was to be preceded by low level bombing and strafing attack by IX Fighter Command. Briefed by intelligence to expect a "milk run" The 367th flew at low altitude through what turned out to be a heavily defended area. Within two to three minutes after beginning the attack the 394th Squadron lost five pilots. Seven group pilots were killed in action. Nearly all surviving group aircraft received battle damage and the 367th was out of action for several days.

Ninth Air Force moved its medium bomber forces to bases closer to the Continent in July, so they would be able to strike targets near the expanding front in France. The 387th Bombardment Group was moved to Stoney Cross, forcing the 367th to vacate their station and move the short distance to RAF Ibsley. From Ibsley the group struck railroads, marshaling yards, and trains to prevent enemy reinforcements from reaching the front during the Allied breakthrough at Saint Lo in July 1944.

==== Operations on the European Continent ====
Starting on 19 July the group's forward echelon crossed the English Channel to take up stations in Normandy. Group headquarters and the 394th shared Beuzeville Airfield with the 371st Fighter Group, while the 392d Squadron was at Carentan Airfield, and the 393d at Cricqueville Airfield, advanced landing grounds made from pierced steel planking. (Note: Maurer gives the location of the 394th as Sainte-Mère-Église, but this is the same airfield (A-6) called Beuzeville elsewhere. Maurer, Combat Squadrons, pp. 484–485, Groh, p. 59.) After the breakout of ground forces in the Saint-Lô area, the group concentrated on close air support of General Patton's Third Army. In late August, the group attacked German Seventh Army convoys which, to prevent being surrounded, were withdrawing eastward from the Falaise pocket. Five convoys and 100 Tiger Tanks were destroyed on one day. By mid August the group and its squadrons were able to operate from a single base, Cricqueville Airfield.

On 22 August the group attacked three Luftwaffe airfields near Laon. The 392d Squadron dive bombed and destroyed two hangars on one airfield but were jumped by twelve Focke-Wulf Fw 190s as they completed their attack. Eighteen Messerschmitt Bf 109s and Fw 190s engaged the 393d Squadron as it reformed from its dive bomb run. After bombing its target, the 394th Squadron turned to reinforce the 392d. The group claimed fourteen enemy aircraft against a loss of one Lightning.

The 367th received a Distinguished Unit Citation when it returned to the Laon area three days later. That day, the group attacked Luftwaffe airfields at Clastres, Péronne and Rosières-en-Haye through an intense flak barrage. The group then engaged more than thirty Focke-Wulf 190 fighters that had just taken off. Group claims were 25 enemy aircraft destroyed, one probably destroyed and 17 damaged against the loss of 6 group aircraft. (Note: These claims were from an estimated 50 enemy aircraft engaged in the air and on the ground. Chickering, p. 79) Then, despite a low fuel supply, the group strafed a train and convoy after leaving the scene of battle. Captain Larry Blumer of the 393d Squadron destroyed five enemy aircraft becoming an ace on one mission. In the afternoon the 367th destroyed sixteen Junkers Ju 52s while on a long range fighter sweep of more than 800 miles to airfields in the Dijon-Bordeaux area.

As Allied forces moved forward across France the group began leap-frogging to new bases. In early September they relocated at Peray Airfield (A-44), but moved again a week later to Clastres Airfield (A-71). From Clastres The 367th supported Operation Market-Garden by escorting troop carrier aircraft and attacking flak positions. For its attacks that fall, the group was cited in the Order of the Day by the Belgium Army.

In late October, as Ninth Air Force brought its medium bombers to bases in France, the 367th was bumped from its station for the second time by the 387th Bombardment Group, when it moved to Juvincourt Airfield (A-68), north of Reims. Juvincourt was a former Luftwaffe base with permanent facilities, in contrast to the advanced landing grounds where the group had been based since moving to France. The group attacked German strong points to aid the Allied push against the Siegfried Line throughout the fall of 1944.

The German Ardennes Offensive occurred as the holidays approached. A planned move to a field in Belgium was canceled. On 18 December, the 393rd Squadron was sent a Forward Air Control team to Bastogne to assist the 101st Airborne Division, arriving just an hour before the Wehrmacht cut the last road access to Bastogne. When the weather finally broke, the team was able to direct flights of fighter-bomber aircraft attacking the Germans. During the Battle of the Bulge, the 367th, after escorting C-47s on a resupply drop to encircled troops at Bastogne, conducted an armed reconnaissance of the Trier area. The 394th Squadron was engaged by Fw 190s and a 40-minute air battle ensued in which the group claimed eight destroyed, two probably destroyed and nine damaged.

==== Transition to the P-47 Thunderbolt ====
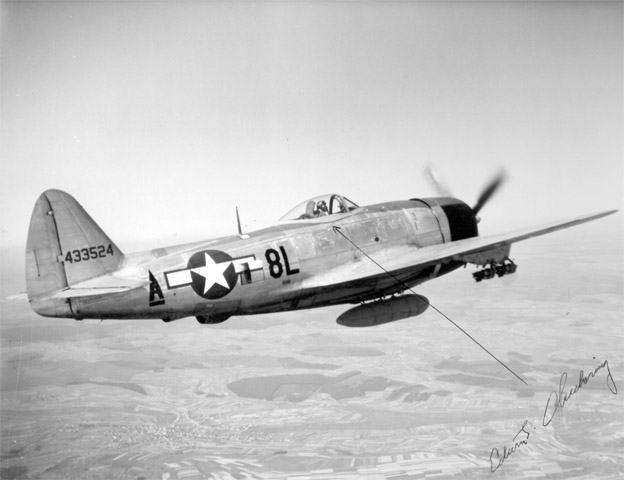
The P-47D of the Group commander, Col. Chickering, in 1945

Early in 1945 a desire to standardize the fighter-bombers in Ninth Air Force, the group transitioned into Republic P-47 Thunderbolts. Pilots flew Lightnings on combat missions while training at the same time with the Thunderbolt. The 393d Squadron was the first to fly combat missions with the P-47s. Using the Thunderbolt the group was again cited in a Belgium Army Order of the Day, earning the Belgian Fourragere.

The 367th received a second Distinguished Unit Citation for action on 19 March 1945. The group's target was the headquarters of Field Marshal Kesselring, the German Commander-ln-Chief, West, (Note: Kesselring assumed command the day of the attack. American intelligence believed Field Marshall von Rundstedt was still in command. Groh, p. 136.) at Ziegenburg near Bad Nauheim, Germany. Aircraft of the leading 394th Squadron would attack at low level to achieve surprise, carrying a 1,000-pound bomb under each wing. The P-47s of the 392d Squadron would be similarly armed, but would dive bomb from a higher altitude. The bombs were equipped with time-delay fuses intended to crack the concrete roofs of the bunker. The 393rd Squadron carried napalm intended to seep into the bunkers and burn what remained. The attack was scheduled for a time that intelligence reports indicated would find senior staff and commanders at lunch, the only time they would not be in the reinforced tunnels underneath the castle that housed the headquarters. The target was located in mountainous terrain well defended by antiaircraft artillery. Moreover, to avoid alerting the Germans to the pending attack, photographic reconnaissance aircraft had avoided the area, so detailed target photography was not available. The day of the attack the castle was concealed by ground haze which caused the 394th to stray off course at the last minute, preventing them from executing the attack as planned and reducing the element of surprise. Although senior German officers reached the underground bunkers and survived the attack, the group reduced the military complex to ruins, disrupting communications and the flow of intelligence at a critical time.

The group struck tanks, trucks, flak positions, and other objectives in support of the assault across the Rhine late in March and the final allied operations in Germany. It was commended by the commanding generals of XII Corps and the 11th Armored Division for the close air support the group provided for their commands. On 10 April the group moved to Eschborn Airfield on the northwest side of Frankfurt, Germany. The 367th flew its last combat mission, a defensive patrol, one year after entering combat on 8 May.

All hostilities ceased the following day, exactly one year after the group became operational. On 4 June the 367th led a flyby for General Weyland. On 1 July it was announced the 367th was to redeploy to the Pacific Theater of Operations after it was re-equipped with and trained with long range P-47Ns in preparation for Operation Downfall, the invasion of Japan. The group moved to Camp Detroit in France then to a staging area near Marseille. Here it boarded two ships, the USS General C. G. Morton, and the USNS John Ericsson (T-AO-194). When Japan surrendered, the Morton was diverted to Newport News, Virginia while the Ericcson sailed for Staten Island, New York. Following leave for everyone, the few personnel that remained in the group after transfers and discharges reassembled at Seymour Johnson Field, North Carolina on 2 November, and the 367th was inactivated there on 7 November 1945.

==== Statistical summary ====
The 367th participated in seven campaigns. It had flown 14,175 combat sorties destroying 432 enemy aircraft, probably destroying another 28 and damaging 344. (Note: Ninth Air Force included credit for aircraft destroyed in the air or on the ground and that practice is reflected in these totals. The victories in the table include air-to-air victories only and reflect adjustments made to totals between 1945 and 1962.) They had also destroyed or damaged 384 locomotives, 4,672 motor vehicles and 8,288 railroad cars.

367th Fighter Group

Aerial Victories	Call Sign	Fuselage Code	Number	Note
Group Hq	Dynamite		0
392d Fighter Squadron	Knobhole	H5	39.5
393d Fighter Squadron	Decco	8L	22.5
394th Fighter Squadron	Casket	4N	23
Group Total			85

=== Air National Guard ===
==== Organization and federal recognition ====
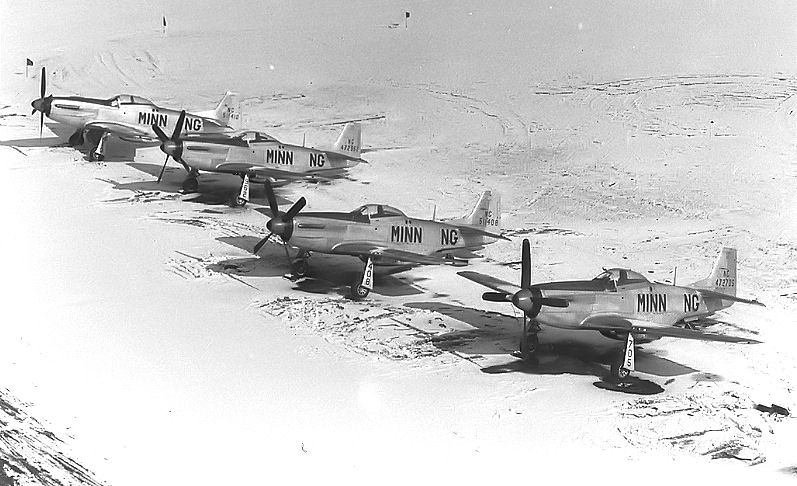
109th Fighter Squadron F-51 Mustangs parked in the snow

The 367th Fighter Group was redesignated the 133rd Fighter Group and was allotted to the National Guard on 24 May 1946. The group was organized at Holman Field, Saint Paul, Minnesota and was extended federal recognition on 28 August 1947. It was assigned the 109th Fighter Squadron and 179th Fighter Squadron at Holman Field and the 178th Fighter Squadron of the North Dakota Air National Guard. (Note: The 178th and 179th Fighter Squadrons were two of the group's World War II squadrons, the 392d and 393d, which had also been allotted to the National Guard and renumbered. Maurer, Combat Squadrons, pp. 481–483.) All three squadrons had been federally recognized earlier and had begun training with the North American F-51D Mustang. The 179th soon moved to Duluth Municipal Airport.

In the fall of 1950, the Air National Guard reorganized under the wing base organization system, and the 133d Fighter Wing was activated on 1 November 1950 to command the 133d Fighter Group and its newly formed support organizations.

==== Mobilization during Korean War ====
The group and its squadrons were called to active duty in March 1951 due to the growth of the Air Force during the Korean War. It was assigned to Air Defense Command (ADC), along with its two squadrons in Minnesota, but the 178th Squadron was transferred to the 146th Fighter-Bomber Group upon mobilization. The group and its two remaining squadrons were renamed fighter-interceptor units with a mission of air defense. The group continued to fly the Mustang while on active duty. ADC was having difficulty under the existing wing base organizational structure in deploying fighter squadrons to best advantage. It reorganized by inactivating its fighter wings and groups and reassigning their squadrons to geographically organized headquarters. The group was inactivated in February 1952 and its squadrons assigned to the 31st Air Division.

==== Return to state control ====
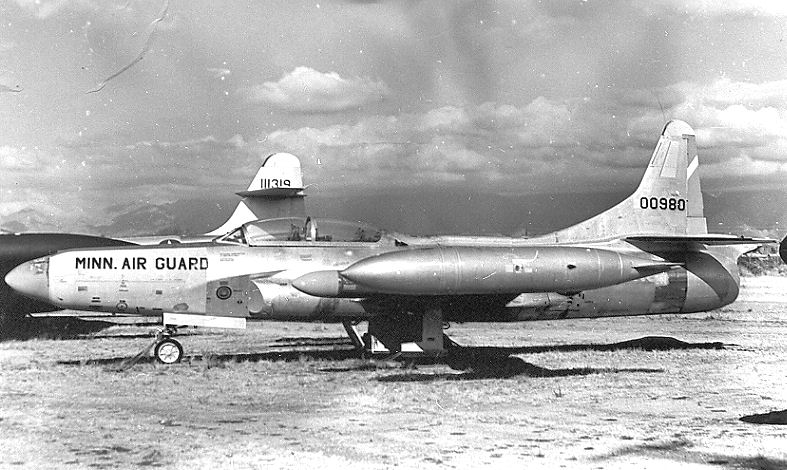
109th Fighter-Interceptor Squadron F-94C (Note: Aircraft is Lockheed F-94C-1-LO Starfire serial 50–980. This aircraft now on display at the National Museum of the United States Air Force, marked as 50-1054)

In December 1953 the group was returned to the Minnesota Air National Guard, retaining its air defense mission. In 1956, the 133d Fighter-Interceptor Wing reorganized along the regional model of its gaining command, ADC, becoming the 133d Air Defense Wing. The 133d Group became the 133d Fighter Group (Air Defense) and its squadrons in Duluth and Hector Airport North Dakota were reassigned to newly formed Fighter Groups. The wing support organizations were split among the 133d Group and the newly formed organizations.

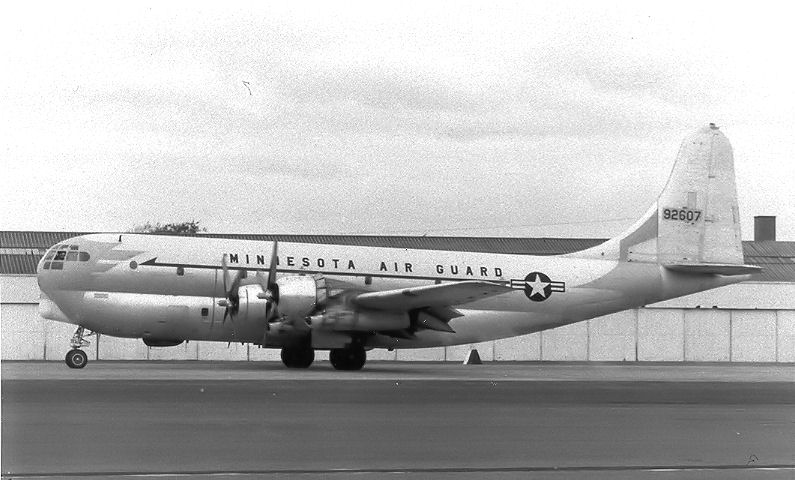
109th Air Transport Squadron C-97A (Note: Aircraft is Boeing C-97A Stratofreighter serial 49-2607.)

It continued as an air defense fighter organization until 1960 when it transitioned into an airlift mission with Boeing C-97 Stratofreighters. during the Berlin Crisis of 1961, the group was mobilized and its units served directly wing control. In 1971, the group transitioned into Lockheed C-130 Hercules aircraft. The group was inactivated in 1975, but reactivated in 1994, again flying the Hercules.

== Lineage ==
- Constituted as 367th Fighter Group on 26 May 1943

Activated on 15 July 1943
Inactivated on 7 November 1945

- Redesignated 133d Fighter Group and allotted to the National Guard on 24 May 1946

Activated on 22 August 1947
Federally recognized on 28 August 1947

- Ordered into active service on 1 March 1951
- Redesignated 133d Fighter-Interceptor Group on 23 March 1951

Inactivated on 6 February 1952
Relieved from active duty, returned to the Air National Guard and activated on 1 December 1952
Redesignated 133d Fighter Group (Air Defense) on 15 April 1956
Redesignated 133d Air Transport Group, Heavy c. 11 April 1960
Federalized and placed on active duty on 1 October 1961
Released from active duty and returned to Minnesota state control on 31 August 1962
Redesignated 133d Military Airlift Group on 1 January 1966
Redesignated 133d Tactical Airlift Group on 20 March 1971
Inactivated on 9 February 1975

- Redesignated 133d Operations Group

Activated c. 1 March 1994

=== Assignments ===
- IV Fighter Command, 15 July 1943 (attached to San Francisco Fighter Wing, 10 December 1943 – 8 March 1944)
- 70th Fighter Wing, 6 July 1944 (attached to IX Tactical Air Command after 3 October 1944)
- XIX Tactical Air Command, 16 January – July 1945
- III Fighter Command, – 7 September November 1945
- 71st Fighter Wing, 28 August 1947
- 86th Fighter Wing, c. 1 August 1949
- 133d Fighter Wing (later 133d Fighter-Interceptor Wing), 1 November 1950 – 6 February 1952
- 133d Fighter-Interceptor Wing (later 133d Air Defense Wing, 133d Air Transport Wing, 133d Military Airlift Wing, 133d Tactical Airlift Wing), 1 December 1952 – 9 February 1975
- 133d Airlift Wing, 1 March 1994 – present

=== Stations ===
- Hamilton Field, California, 15 July 1943
- Santa Rosa Army Air Field, California, 11 October 1943
- Oakland Municipal Airport, California, 10 December 1943 – 8 March 1944
- RAF Stoney Cross (AAF-452), England, 5 April 1944
- RAF Ibsley (AAF-347), England, 6 July 1944
- Beuzeville Airfield (A-6), France, 22 July 1944
- Cricqueville Airfield (A-2), France, 14 August 1944
- Peray Airfield (A-44), France, 4 September 1944
- Clastres Airfield (A-71), France, 8 September 1944
- Juvincourt Airfield (A-68), France, 28 October 1944
- St-Dizier Airfield (A-64), France, 1 February 1945
- Conflans Airfield (A-94), France, 14 March 1945
- Eschborn Airfield (Y-74), Germany, 20 April – July 1945
- Seymour Johnson Field, North Carolina, – 7 September November 1945
- Holman Field, Minnesota, 28 August 1947
- Fort Snelling (later Snelling Air Force Station, 21 January 1951 – 6 February 1952
- Holman Field, 1 December 1952
- Wold-Chamberlain Field (later Minneapolis-St Paul International Airport), Minnesota, c. 1 January 1956 – 9 February 1975
- Minneapolis-St Paul International Joint Air Reserve Station, Minnesota, 1 March 1994 – present

=== Components ===
Operational Squadrons

- 392d Fighter Squadron: 15 June 1943 – 7 November 1945

Later 178th Fighter Squadron, 178th Fighter-Interceptor Squadron, 17 September 1947 − 1 March 1951; 1 January 1953 − 15 April 1956

- 393d Fighter Squadron: 15 June 1943 – 7 November 1945

Later 179th Fighter Squadron, 179th Fighter-Interceptor Squadron, 28 August 1947 − 6 February 1952, 1 December 1952 – 15 April 1956

- 394th Fighter Squadron: 15 June 1943 – 7 November 1945
- 109th Fighter Squadron (later 109th Fighter-Interceptor Squadron, 109th Air Transport Squadron, 109th Military Airlift Squadron, 109th Tactical Airlift Squadron, 109th Airlift Squadron, 28 August 1947 − 6 February 1952, 1 December 1952 – 9 February 1975, 1 March 1994 – present
- 167th Air Transport Squadron (later 167th Military Airlift Squadron, 167th Tactical Airlift Squadron), 1 April 1961 − 30 June 1972 (West Virginia ANG)
- 175th Fighter Squadron (later 175th Fighter-Interceptor Squadron), 2 March 1951 − 6 February 1952, 1 December 1952 16 April 1956

Sioux Falls Municipal Airport, South Dakota

Support Organizations

- 133d Aeromedical Evacuation Squadron, 19 August 1951 – c. 1967
- 133d Air Base Squadron, 15 April 1956 – 1 July 1961
- 133d Consolidated Aircraft Maintenance Squadron, 1 January 1959 – 9 February 1975
- 133d Materiel Squadron, 15 April 1956 – 1 February 1965
- 133d Operations Support Squadron, 1 March 1994 – present
- 133d Support Squadron (later 133d Combat Support Squadron), 1 October 1963 – 9 February 1975
- 109th Aeromedical Evacuation Flight, 1 March 1994 – present
- 133d Aerial Port Flight, 20 March 1971 – 9 February 1975
- 133d Airlift Control Flight, 1 March 1994 – present
- 133d USAF Dispensary, 15 April 1956 – 1 April 1960

=== Aircraft ===
- Bell P-39 Airacobra, 1943–1944
- Lockheed P-38 Lightning, 1944–1945
- Republic P-47 Thunderbolt, 1945–1945
- F-51D Mustang, 1947–1954
- Lockheed F-94A Starfire, 1954–1957
- Lockheed F-94B Starfire, 1954–1957
- Lockheed F-94C Starfire, 1957–1960
- Northrop F-89H Scorpion, 1958–1960
- Boeing C-97 Stratofreighter, 1960–1971
- Lockheed C-130A Hercules, 1971–1975
- Lockheed C-130E Hercules, 1994–1995
- Lockheed C-130H Hercules, 1995–present

== See also ==
- F-89 Scorpion units of the United States Air Force
- F-94 Starfire units of the United States Air Force
- List of aviators who became ace in a day
- List of groups and wings of the United States Air National Guard
- List of Lockheed C-130 Hercules operators
- List of Lockheed P-38 Lightning operators
