= Cricqueville-en-Bessin =

- Commune
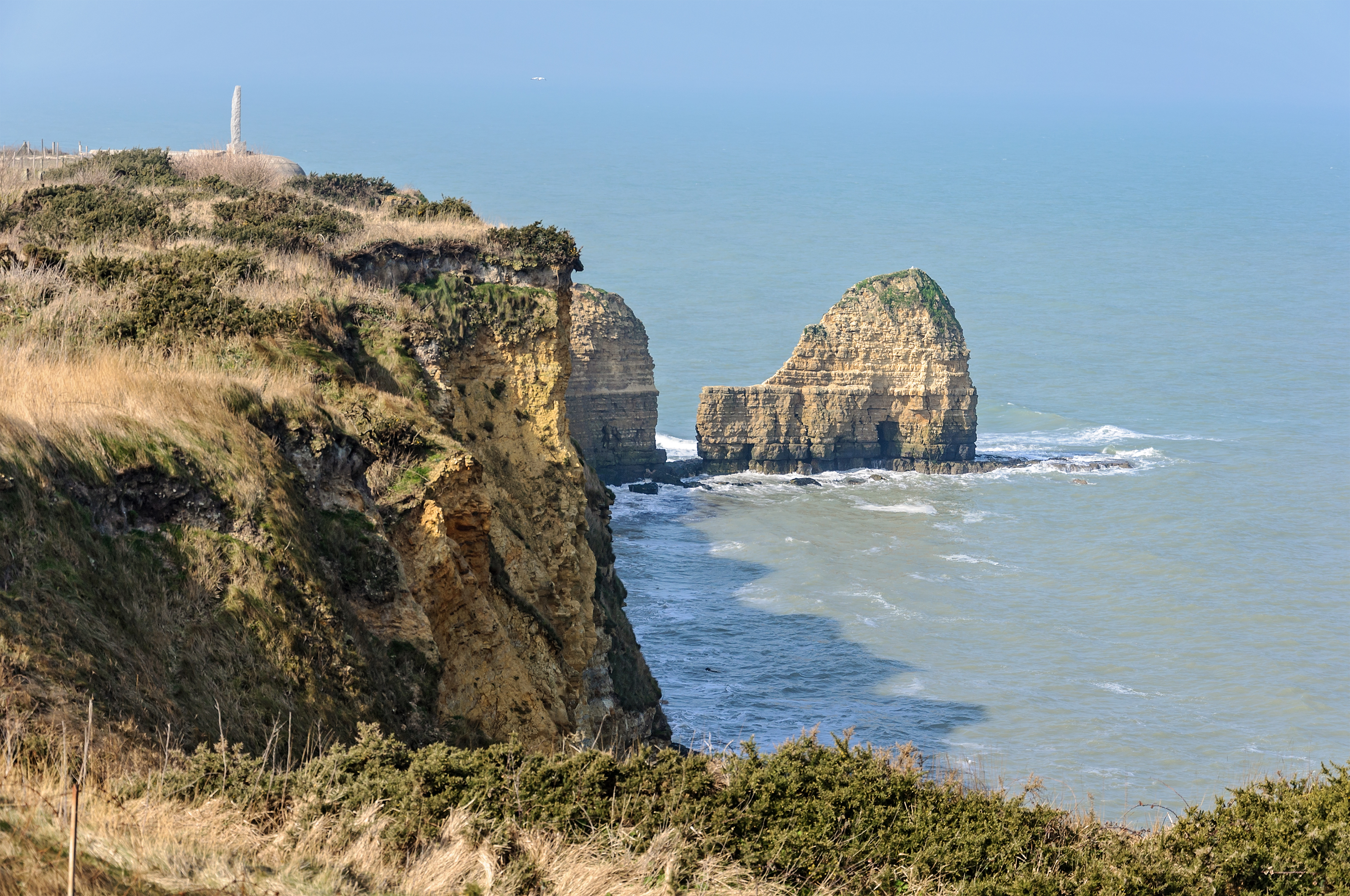
- La Pointe du Hoc
- Location of Cricqueville-en-Bessin
- Location within France Location within Normandy
- Coordinates: 49°22′38″N 1°00′01″W
- Country: France
- Region: Normandy
- Department: Calvados
- Arrondissement: Bayeux
- Canton: Trévières
- Intercommunality: CC Isigny-Omaha Intercom

Government
  - Mayor (2022–2026): Pascale Vibet
- Area^{1}: 8.55 km^{2} (3.30 sq mi)
- Elevation: 50 m (160 ft)
- Highest elevation: 39 m (128 ft)
- Lowest elevation: 0 m (0 ft)
- Population (2023): 168
  - Density: 19.6/km^{2} (50.9/sq mi)
- Time zone: UTC+01:00 (CET)
  - Summer (DST): UTC+02:00 (CEST)
- INSEE/Postal code: 14204 /14450
- ^{1} French Land Register data, which excludes lakes, ponds, glaciers > 1 km^{2} (0.386 sq mi or 247 acres) and river estuaries.

Cricqueville-en-Bessin (French pronunciation: [kʁikvil ɑ̃ bɛsɛ̃], literally Cricqueville in Bessin) is a commune in the Calvados department in the Normandy region in northwestern France.

The municipality takes its name from its deep-water creek that forms a natural harbor, from Crycavilla.

== History ==
=== World War II ===
Just outside Cricqueville, the United States Army Air Forces established an airfield shortly after D-Day on 9 June 1944, just three days after the Allied landings in France. The airfield was one of the first established in the liberated area of Normandy. Known as Advanced Landing Ground "A-2" (Cricqueville), it was used from early June though September 1944. After the Americans moved east into Central France, the airfield was dismantled and the land returned to agricultural use.

== Population ==
Historical population
Year	Pop.	±% p.a.
1968	200	—
1975	190	−0.73%
1982	157	−2.69%
1990	171	+1.07%
1999	182	+0.70%
2007	183	+0.07%
2012	188	+0.54%
2017	194	+0.63%
2023	168	−2.37%
Source: INSEE

== See also ==
- Communes of the Calvados department
- Pointe du Hoc, a point of attack by the United States Army during the Battle of Normandy
