= IX Tactical Air Command =

WWII US Army Air Forces command

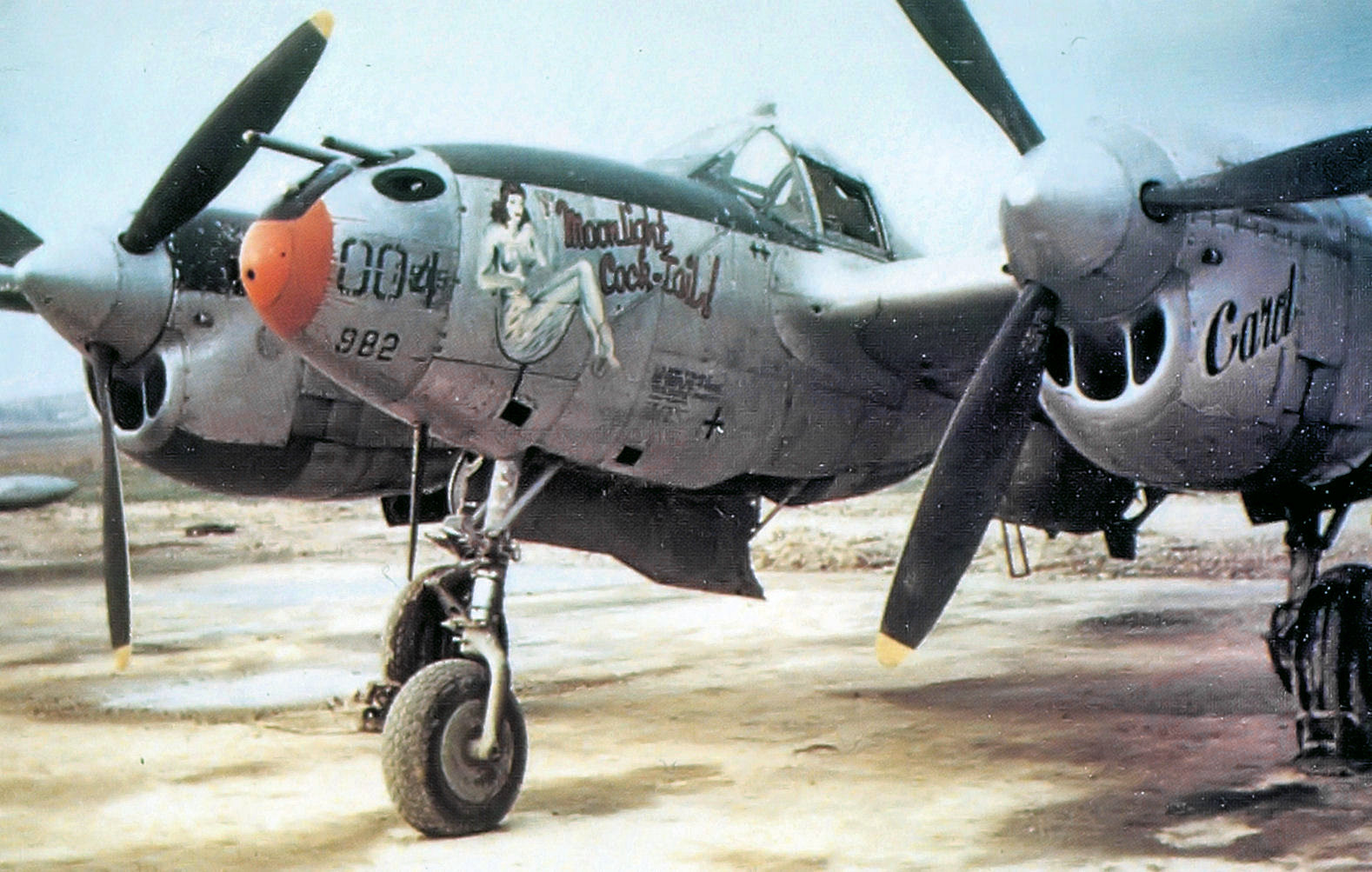
- P-38 Lightning of a command unit (Note: Aircraft is Lockheed P-38G-10-LO Lightning, serial 42-12982 of the 367th Fighter Group.)
- Active: 1943-1945
- Country: United States
- Branch: United States Air Force
- Role: Command of fighter bomber units
- Engagements: European theater of World War II

Commanders
- Notable commanders: Maj Gen Elwood Richard Quesada

The IX Tactical Air Command was a formation of the United States Army Air Forces. It fought in the European theater of World War II. Its last assignment was at Camp Shanks, New York, where it was inactivated on 25 October 1945.

== History ==
Formed in the United Kingdom during 1943 as the IX Air Support Command, its primary role was to provide close air support for the U.S. First Army. Re-designated as the IX Tactical Air Command in April 1944, its initial missions included interdicting transportation, disrupting communications and destroying warehouses and supply dumps in occupied France and the Low Countries in preparation for the Normandy Invasion in June. Targets included bridges, road junctions, railroads, airfields, radio towers and telephone exchanges. Engaging enemy aircraft in the air and establishing air superiority was another priority.

After the Normandy landings on 6 June 1944, IX Tactical Air Command Republic P-47 Thunderbolts concentrated on enemy targets in the Cotentin Peninsula area and afterward supported Operation Cobra, the breakout of Normandy. Paying particular attention to German forces in the Falaise-Argentan Gap, targets were expanded to include tanks, vehicles of all types and troop formations. Many times targets of opportunity on the ground were spontaneously attacked when spotted. Coordinated attacks were made with Allied ground forces, especially when they were being held up by strong defenses. Thunderbolts dropped bombs at low level, made rocket attacks and strafed enemy positions with demoralizing effect.

Wing headquarters and subordinate units operated primarily from liberated airfields and temporary Advanced Landing Grounds. Moving into north-central France, its groups attacked enemy targets near Paris and then concentrated its activity north-west across Belgium and into the southern Netherlands. In December 1944 and January 1945 it engaged targets on the north flank of the Battle of the Bulge, then concentrated eastward into the Northern Rhineland as part of the Western Allied invasion of Germany.

The First Army was closely supported as it crossed the Rhine River at Remagen after which attacks were made on ground targets in the Ruhr district where air support was given to Allied forces that had encircled a large concentration of German troops in the Ruhr Pocket. That operation essentially ended organized enemy resistance in western Germany. The First Army halted its advance at the Elbe River in late April 1945 after which the wing engaged targets of opportunity in enemy-controlled areas until the fighting ended on 5 May 1945.

The IX Tactical Air Command remained in Europe after the war as part of United States Air Forces in Europe (USAFE), performing occupation duty and the destruction or shipment to the United States of captured enemy combat equipment. Assigned units also performed air defense duty over the American Zone of Occupation. It returned to the United States and was inactivated during October 1945.

== Lineage ==
- Constituted as the IX Air Support Command on 29 November 1943

Activated on 4 December 1943
Redesignated IX Tactical Air Command c. 24 April 1944
Inactivated on 25 October 1945
Disbanded on 8 October 1948

=== Assignments ===
- Ninth Air Force, 4 December 1943
- Unknown, 17 August 1945 – 25 October 1945

=== Components ===
Wings

- 70th Fighter Wing: 3 October 1944 – 2 December 1945
- 71st Fighter Wing: 1944
- 84th Fighter Wing: 30 April 1944 – 12 August 1945
- 100th Fighter Wing: 12 December 1943 – 4 January 1944; 1 February − 1 March 1944; 1 March − 15 April 1944

Groups

- 36th Fighter Group: 28 January – 15 November 1945
- 48th Fighter-Bomber Group (later 48th Fighter Group): 31 March 1944 – 28 April 1945
- 50th Fighter Group: 4 April – 29 September 1944 (under operational control of 84th Fighter Wing after 7 April 1944)
- 67th Tactical Reconnaissance Group (later 67th Reconnaissance Group): February 1944 – 19 September 1945
- 358th Fighter Group: Attached 1 August-1 October 1944; 1 October 1944 – 16 January 1945
- 362d Fighter Group: Attached 13 April-1 August 1944
- 363d Fighter Group: Attached 23 December 1943 – 1 August 1944
- 365th Fighter Group: Attached 22 December 1943 – 1 August 1944; 1 August-1 October 1944
- 366th Fighter Group: 15 February – 1 October 1944; 22 October 1944 – 28 January 1945
- 367th Fighter Group: Attached 3 October 1944 – 16 January 1945
- 368th Fighter Group: Attached 1 August-1 October 1944; 1 October 1944 – 16 January 1945
- 370th Fighter Group: Attached 1 August-1 October 1944; 1 October 1944 – 1 February 1945
- 404th Fighter Group: 16 January – 1 August 1945; Attached 1 August-26 October 1944
- 405th Fighter-Bomber Group (later 405th Fighter Group), assigned March – June 1944; attached 5 August − c. September 1944)
- 474th Fighter Group: Attached 1 August 1944 – 21 November 1945

Squadrons

- 4th Air Support Control Squadron: 12 December 1943 – 4 March 1944
- 6th Air Support Communications Squadron (later 6th Tactical Air Communications Squadron): 26 February – 15 September 1944
- 11th Air Support Control Squadron: 26 February – 4 March 1944
- 39th Photographic Reconnaissance Squadron: flight attached 6 January – 10 March 1945
- 153d Liaison Squadron: 25 April 1944 – 15 July 1945 (attached to Twelfth Army Group after 15 November 1944
- 155th Photographic Reconnaissance Squadron: 12 July – 1 August 1945
- 422d Night Fighter Squadron: 12 March – 4 May 1944; 7 October 1944-30 September 1945

Other

- 555th Signal Aircraft Warning Battalion, 13 September 1944 – 22 February 1945

=== Stations ===
- RAF Aldermaston (AAF-467), England, 4 December 1943
- RAF Middle Wallop (AAF-449), England, February 1944
- RAF Uxbridge (AAF-409), England, 15 February–June 1944
- Au Gay, France, 10 June 1944
- Les Oubeaux, France, 2 July 1944
- Canisy, France, 2 August 1944
- Coulouvray-Boisbenâtre, France, 12 August 1944
- Haleine, France, 22 August 1944
- Versailles, France, 2 September 1944
- Jamioulx, Belgium, 11 September 1944
- Verviers, Belgium, 2 October 1944
- Brühl, Germany, 26 March 1945
- Marburg, Germany, 8 April 1945
- Weimar Airfield (R-7), Germany, 26 April 1945
- AAF Station Fritzlar (Y-86), Germany, 26 June–September 1945
- Camp Shanks, New York, 24–25 October 1945
