= Doncourt-lès-Conflans Airport =

Doncourt-lès-Conflans Airport Advanced Landing Ground (ALG) A-94
- IATA: none; ICAO: LFGR

Summary
- Location: Conflans, France
- Elevation AMSL: 804 ft / 245 m
- Coordinates: 49°09′06″N 005°55′54″E

Map
- Location of Doncourt-lès-Conflans Airport

Runways
Direction	Length		Surface
Direction	ft	m	Surface
08/26	2,953	900	Grass

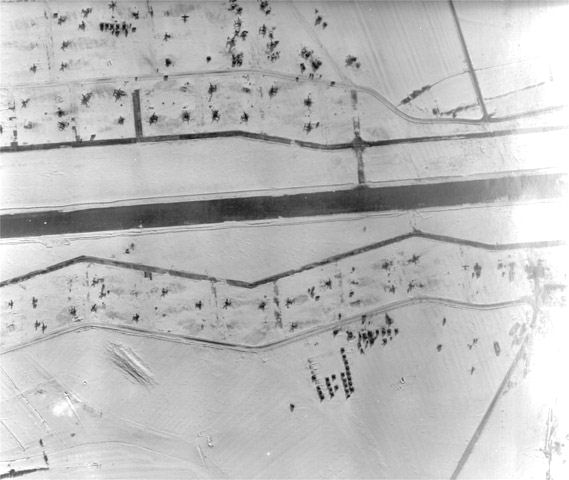
USAAF Advanced Landing Ground A-94, Winter 1944/1945

Doncourt-lès-Conflans Airport (ICAO: LFGR) is a regional airport in France, located 6 miles (9.7 km) south-southwest of Homécourt (Departement de Meurthe-et-Moselle, Grand Est); 160 miles (260 km) east of Paris

It supports general aviation with no commercial airline service scheduled.

== History ==
Doncourt-lès-Conflans Airport's origins begin in September 1944 when the airfield was built by the United States Army Air Forces IX Engineer Command 830th Engineering Aviation Regiment. Allied ground forces had moved through the area during the Northern France Campaign in early September, and on `9 September the combat engineers arrived to lay down a temporary airfield to support the ground forces in their advance against enemy forces.

The 830th EAR laid down a 5000' grass runway aligned roughly east–west (08/26), along with a small support area. The airfield was declared operationally ready on 20 September and was designated as Advanced Landing Ground "A-94", or simply "Conflans Airfield".

The airfield was initially used by various transport units for combat resupply of units and for casualty evacuation.

In late October, the 830th Engineering Aviation Regiment returned to the airfield and improved the facility, laying down an all-weather Pierced Steel Planking (PSP) runway for Ninth Air Force combat fighter use along with upgrading the support site with tents for billeting and also for support facilities; an access road was built to the existing road infrastructure; a dump for supplies, ammunition, and gasoline drums, along with drinkable water and minimal electrical grid for communications and station lighting.

With the upgraded facility, combat units arrived at Conflans. The first was the 10th Reconnaissance Group, which based various photo-reconnaissance aircraft at the field from 20 November 1944 until March 1945. In mid-March, the 10th moved out and was replaced by the 367th Fighter Group, which flew P-38 Lightnings until 20 April 1945 (P-38).

By the end of April the airfield had become redundant combat needs and the facility was returned to being a S&E (Supply and Evacuation) airfield, and was used until being closed on 22 May 1945. The wartime airfield was then turned over to French authorities.

== See also ==
- Advanced Landing Ground

=== Current ===
After the war, the wartime faculties were eventually all removed. The metal PSP runway was picked up being replaced by a turf runway, along with taxiways and a turf parking ramp.

Doncourt-lès-Conflans Airport today is a modern, well-equipped general aviation airport. No evidence of the wartime airfield remains.
