= Cricqueville Airfield =

Cricqueville en Bessin Airfield Advanced Landing Ground (ALG) A-2
- Calvados, Basse-Normandie Region, France
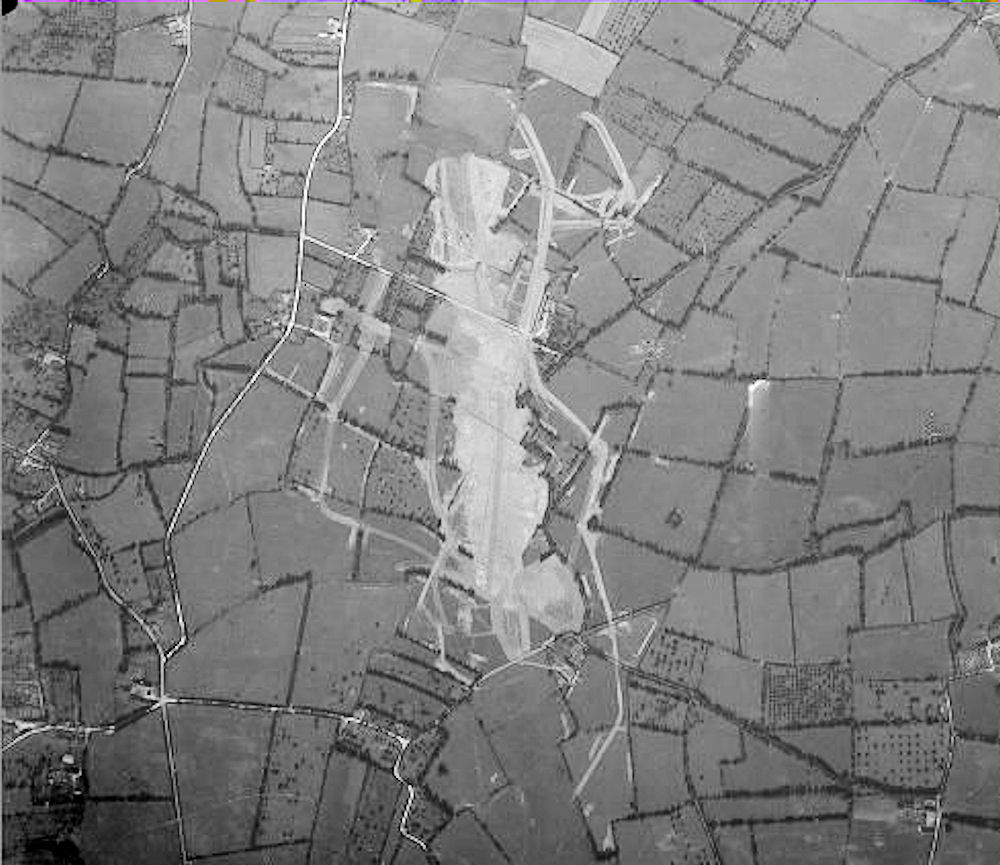
- Photo of Cricqueville en Bessin Airfield A-2 in June 1947, almost 3 years after the airfield had closed.

Site information
- Type: Military Airfield
- Controlled by: United States Army Air Forces

Location
- Coordinates: 49°21′46″N 001°00′38″W

Site history
- Built by: IX Engineering Command
- In use: June–September 1944
- Materials: Square-Mesh Track (SMT)
- Battles/wars: World War II - EAME Theater: Normandy Campaign; Northern France Campaign

Garrison information
- Garrison: Ninth Air Force
- Occupants: 354th Fighter Group; 367th Fighter Group

Airfield information
Runways
Direction	Length and surface
17/35	5,000 feet (1,520 m) SMT/PSP
- One runway, 4 alert pads, 50 hardstands

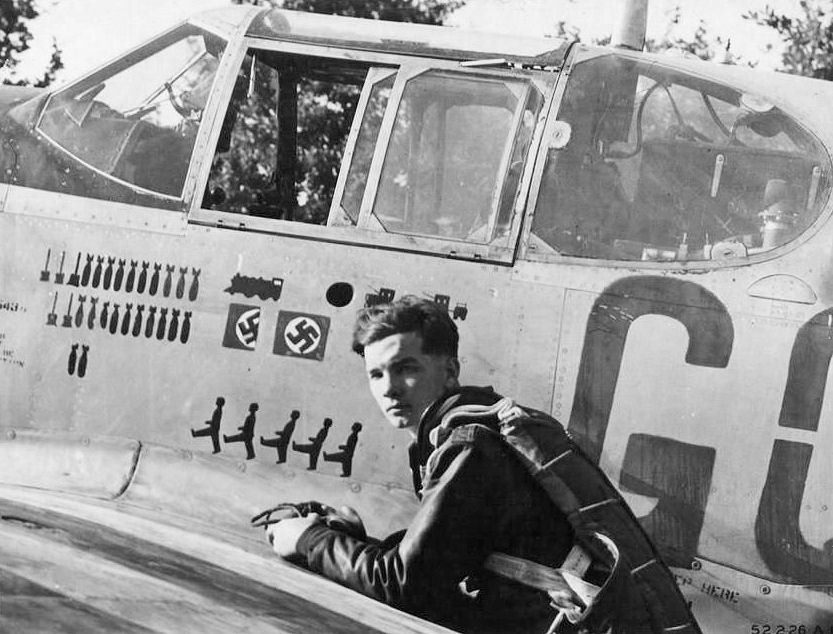
355th Fighter Squadron Lieutenant William B.King before the picture of the P 51B Georgia Peach at Cricqueville en Bessin Airfield (A-2), France

Cricqueville en Bessin Airfield is an abandoned World War II military airfield, which is located near the commune of Cricqueville-en-Bessin in the Normandy region of northern France.

Located just outside Cricqueville-en-Bessin, the United States Army Air Force established a temporary airfield shortly after D-Day on 10 June 1944, shortly after the Allied landings in France The airfield was one of the first established in the liberated area of Normandy, being constructed by the IX Engineer Command, 820th Engineer Aviation Battalion.

== History ==
Known as Advanced Landing Ground "A-2", the airfield consisted of a single 5000' (1500m) Square-Mesh Track/Compressed Earth runway aligned 17/35. In addition, with tents were used for billeting and also for support facilities; an access road was built to the existing road infrastructure; a dump for supplies, ammunition, and gasoline drums, along with a drinkable water and minimal electrical grid for communications and station lighting.

The fighter planes flew support missions during the Allied invasion of Normandy, patrolling roads in front of the beachhead; strafing German military vehicles and dropping bombs on gun emplacements, anti-aircraft artillery and concentrations of German troops in Normandy and Brittany when spotted.

After the Americans moved east into Central France with the advancing Allied Armies, the airfield was left un-garrisoned and used for resupply and casualty evacuation. It was closed on 15 September 1944.

== Major units assigned ==
- 354th Fighter Group 22 June-13 August 1944

353d (FT), 355th (GQ), 356th (AJ) Fighter Squadrons (P-51B)

- 367th Fighter Group 14 August-4 September 1944

392d (HS), 393d (8L), 394th (4N) Fighter Squadrons (P-38)

== Current use ==
After its closure by the Americans, the airfield was dismantled in September 1944 and the land returned to agricultural use. Today there is little or no physical evidence of its existence or its location.

A memorial to the men and units that were stationed at Cricqueville was placed at the site of the former airfield. It is located from the center of Cricqueville (Town Hall-Church), take the D113 direction (toward the Cambe). After 1500 meters, turn left towards the place called "La Grande Lande". The site is about 300 meters immediately to the side of the road on the right.

== See also ==
- Advanced Landing Ground
