= Rosières-en-Haye =

- Commune
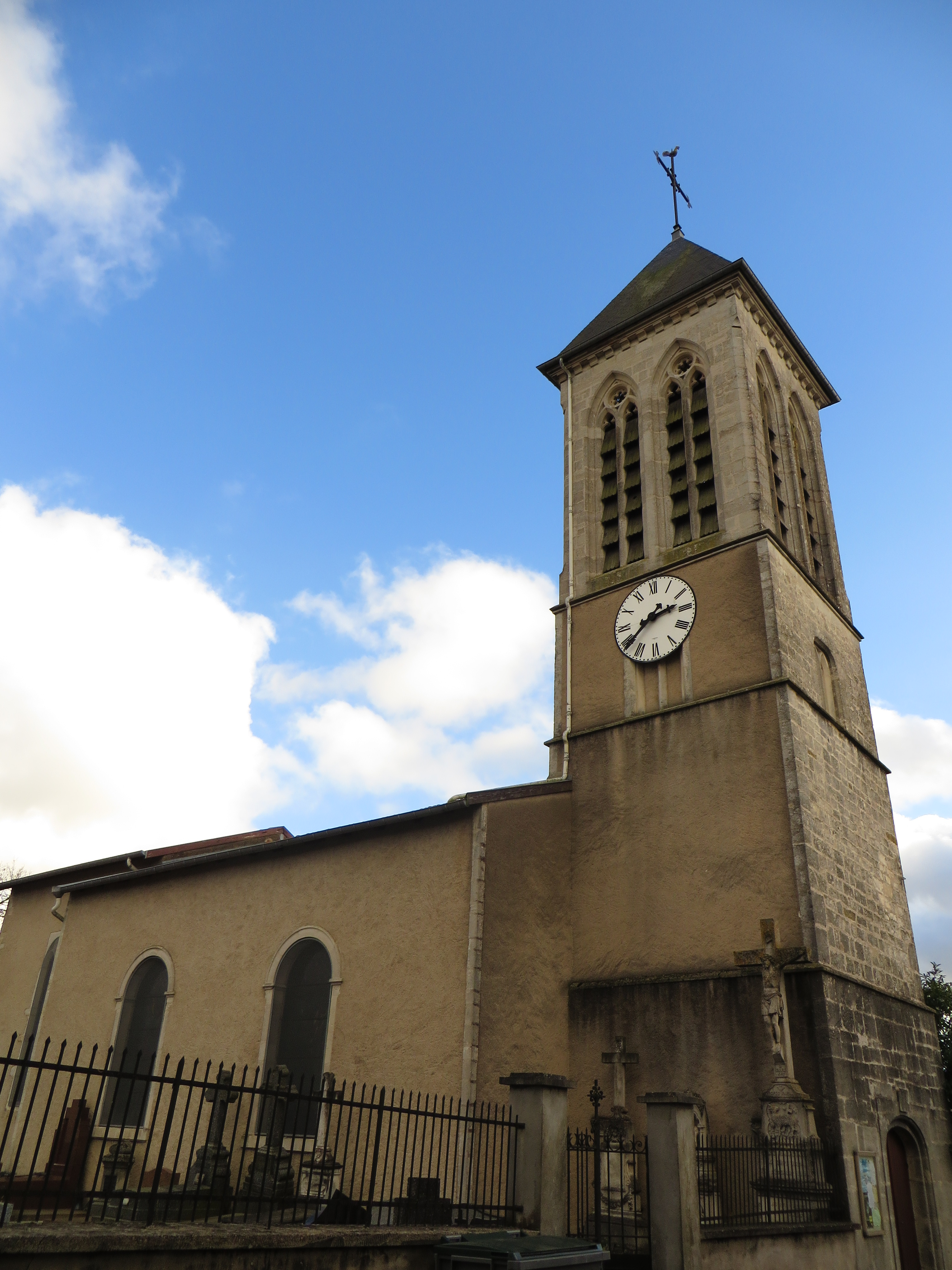
- The church in Rosières-en-Haye

- Coat of arms
- Location of Rosières-en-Haye
- Location within France Location within Grand Est
- Coordinates: 48°47′37″N 6°00′05″E
- Country: France
- Region: Grand Est
- Department: Meurthe-et-Moselle
- Arrondissement: Nancy
- Canton: Le Nord-Toulois
- Intercommunality: CC Bassin de Pont-à-Mousson

Government
  - Mayor (2020–2026): Claude Hanrion
- Area^{1}: 10.74 km^{2} (4.15 sq mi)
- Elevation: 270 m (890 ft)
- Highest elevation: 306 m (1,004 ft)
- Lowest elevation: 235 m (771 ft)
- Population (2023): 258
  - Density: 24.0/km^{2} (62.2/sq mi)
- Time zone: UTC+01:00 (CET)
  - Summer (DST): UTC+02:00 (CEST)
- INSEE/Postal code: 54463 /54385
- ^{1} French Land Register data, which excludes lakes, ponds, glaciers > 1 km^{2} (0.386 sq mi or 247 acres) and river estuaries.

Rosières-en-Haye (French pronunciation: [ʁozjɛʁ ɑ̃ ɛ]) is a commune in the Meurthe-et-Moselle department in north-eastern France. It hosted an important Air Base (the Toul-Rosières Air Base) that has been converted in 2012 in the largest photovoltaic power plant of Europe at that time.

== See also ==
- Toul-Rosières Solar Park
- Communes of the Meurthe-et-Moselle department
- Parc naturel régional de Lorraine
