= List of highways numbered 42 =

The following highways are numbered 42.

== International ==
- AH42 Asian Highway 42
- E42 European route E42

== Australia ==
- National Route 42 – part of Cunningham Highway

== Canada ==
=== Alberta ===
- Alberta Highway 42

=== Manitoba ===
- Manitoba Highway 42
- Winnipeg Route 42

=== Ontario ===
- Chatham-Kent Road 42
- Elgin County Road 42
- County Road 42 (Essex County, Ontario)
- Greater Sudbury Road 42
- Halton Regional Road 42
- Leeds and Grenville County Road 42 (former Ontario Highway 42)
- Middlesex County Road 42
- Muskoka Road 42
- Niagara Regional Road 42
- Norfolk County Road 42
- Ottawa Road 42
- Renfrew County Road 42
- Simcoe County Road 42
- Wellington County Road 42

=== Saskatchewan ===
- Saskatchewan Highway 42

== China ==
- G42 Expressway

== Greece ==
- EO42 road

== Hungary ==
- Main road 42 (Hungary)

== India ==
- National Highway 42 (India)

== Israel ==
- Highway 42 (Israel)

== Japan ==
- Japan National Route 42
- Hanwa Expressway
- Kisei Expressway

== Korea, South ==
- National Route 42

== Poland ==
- National Road 42 (Poland)

== Thailand ==
- Thailand Route 42 (Sadao-Sungai Kolok)

== United Kingdom ==
- English A42 (Appleby Magna-Kegworth)
- Northern Ireland A42 (Maghera-Carnlough)
- British M42 (Appleby Magna-Bromsgrove)

== United States ==
- Interstate 42 (North Carolina)
  - Interstate 42 (Arkansas)
- U.S. Route 42
- Alabama State Route 42 (former)
  - County Route 42 (Lee County, Alabama)
- Arkansas Highway 42
- California State Route 42 (former)
  - County Route J42 (California)
- Colorado State Highway 42
- Connecticut Route 42
- Delaware Route 42
- Florida State Road 42 (former)
  - County Road 42 (Lake County, Florida)
  - County Road 42 (Marion County, Florida)
- Georgia State Route 42
  - Georgia State Route 42A (former)
- Illinois Route 42 (former)
  - Illinois Route 42A (former)
- Indiana State Road 42
- Iowa Highway 42 (former)
- K-42 (Kansas highway)
- Louisiana Highway 42
  - Louisiana State Route 42 (former)
- Maryland Route 42
  - Maryland Route 42A
- M-42 (Michigan highway)
- Minnesota State Highway 42
  - County Road 42 (Dakota County, Minnesota)
  - County Road 42 (Ramsey County, Minnesota)
  - County Road 42 (Scott County, Minnesota)
- Mississippi Highway 42
- Missouri Route 42
- Montana Highway 42
- Nebraska Highway 42 (former)
  - Nebraska Spur 42A
- Nevada State Route 42 (former)
- New Jersey Route 42
  - County Route 42 (Bergen County, New Jersey)
  - County Route 42 (Monmouth County, New Jersey)
- New Mexico State Road 42
- New York State Route 42
  - County Route 42 (Allegany County, New York)
  - County Route 42 (Cattaraugus County, New York)
  - County Route 42B (Cayuga County, New York)
  - County Route 42 (Chautauqua County, New York)
  - County Route 42 (Chenango County, New York)
  - County Route 42 (Dutchess County, New York)
  - County Route 42 (Erie County, New York)
  - County Route 42 (Genesee County, New York)
  - County Route 42 (Herkimer County, New York)
  - County Route 42 (Livingston County, New York)
  - County Route 42 (Madison County, New York)
  - County Route 42 (Putnam County, New York)
  - County Route 42 (Rensselaer County, New York)
  - County Route 42 (Rockland County, New York)
  - County Route 42 (Schoharie County, New York)
  - County Route 42 (St. Lawrence County, New York)
  - County Route 42 (Suffolk County, New York)
  - County Route 42 (Ulster County, New York)
  - County Route 42 (Warren County, New York)
  - County Route 42 (Washington County, New York)
  - County Route 42 (Wyoming County, New York)
- North Carolina Highway 42
- North Dakota Highway 42
- Ohio State Route 42 (1923-1927) (former)
- Oklahoma State Highway 42
- Oregon Route 42
- Pennsylvania Route 42
- South Carolina Highway 42 (1920s) (former)
- South Dakota Highway 42
- Tennessee State Route 42 (former)
- Texas State Highway 42
  - Texas State Highway 42 (pre-1939) (former)
  - Texas State Highway Loop 42
  - Texas Park Road 42
- Utah State Route 42
- Virginia State Route 42
- West Virginia Route 42
- Wisconsin Highway 42

Territories

- Puerto Rico Highway 42
- U.S. Virgin Islands Highway 42

== See also ==
- 42nd Street (disambiguation)
- A42 (disambiguation)#Roads

Preceded by 41	Lists of highways 42	Succeeded by 43
