= Route 43 (disambiguation) =

Route 43 may refer to:

- Route 43 (WMATA), a bus route in Washington, D.C.
- London Buses route 43
- Route 43 (MBTA), a bus route in Boston
- 43 Masonic, a bus route in San Francisco

== See also ==
- List of highways numbered 43
