= Route 42 (disambiguation) =

Route 42 may refer to:

- Route 42 (WMATA), a bus route in Washington, D.C.
- London Buses route 42

== See also ==
- List of highways numbered 42
