= Deceleron =

Type of aileron

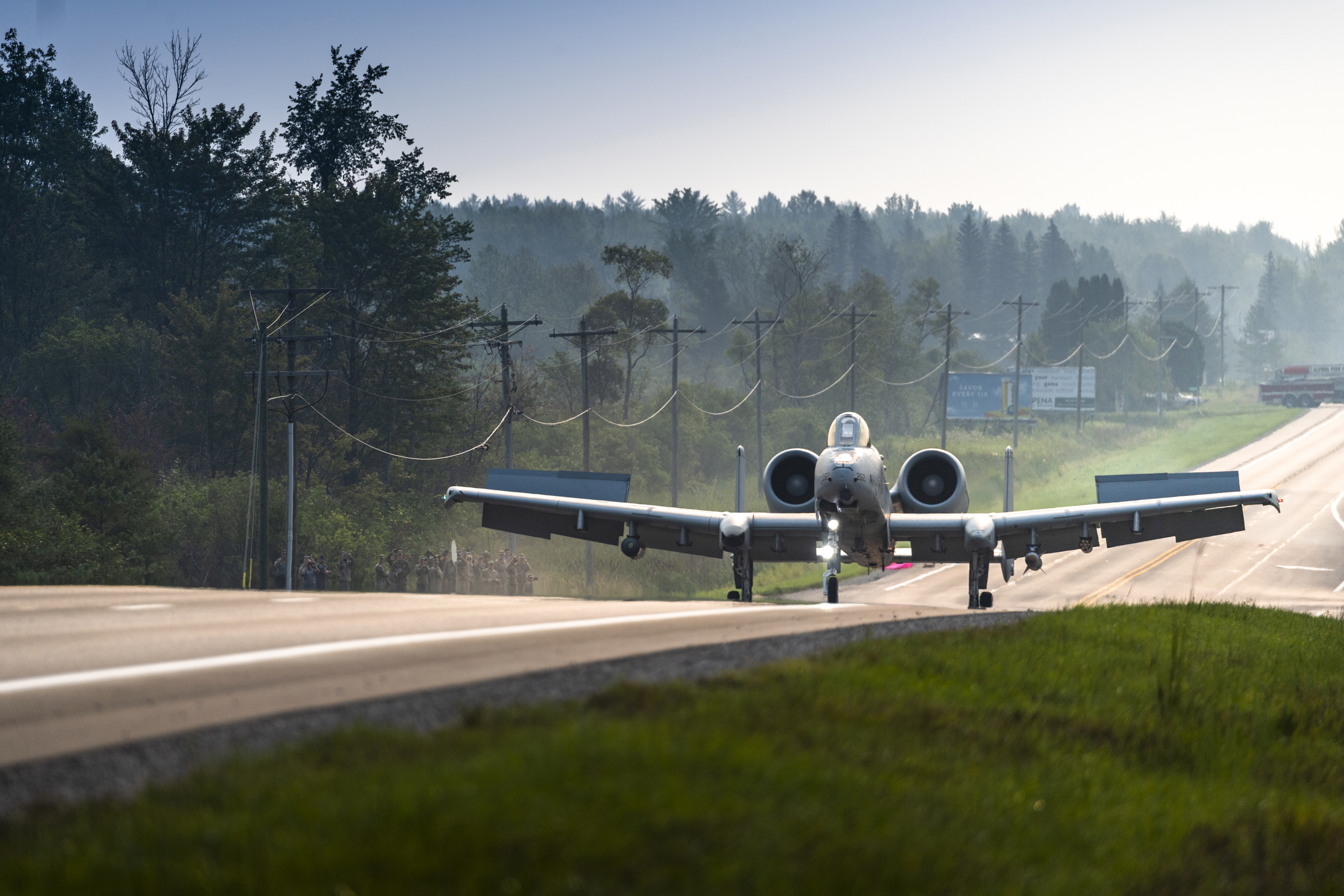
An A-10 Thunderbolt II with its decelerons opened

The deceleron, or split aileron, was developed in the late 1940s by Northrop, originally for use on the F-89 Scorpion fighter. It is a two-part aileron that can be deflected as a unit to provide roll control, or split open to act as an air brake. Decelerons are used on the Fairchild Republic A-10 Thunderbolt II, and in turn to a stabilizer the Northrop Grumman B-2 Spirit flying wing. In differential use they impart yaw moment, potentially obviating the rudder and vertical stabilizer control surface, although requiring active flight control.

== See also ==
- Index of aviation articles
- Spoileron
