= List of highways numbered 43 =

The following is a partial list of highways numbered 43.

== International ==
- AH43 Asian Highway 43
- E43 European route E43

== Australia ==
- – Mwy Link Road, Pacific Highway, New England Highway

== Burma ==
- National Road 43 (Burma)

== Canada ==
- Alberta Highway 43
- British Columbia Highway 43
- Saskatchewan Highway 43

== Hungary ==
- Main road 43 (Hungary)

== India ==
- National Highway 43 (India)

== Iran ==
- Road 43

== Japan ==
- Japan National Route 43

== Korea, South ==
- National Route 43

== Mexico ==
- Mexican Federal Highway 43

== New Zealand ==
- New Zealand State Highway 43

== Thailand ==
- Thailand Route 43 (Songkhla–Pattani)

== United Kingdom ==
- British A43

== United States ==
- Interstate 43
- U.S. Route 43
- Alabama State Route 43 (former)
  - County Route 43 (Lee County, Alabama)
- Arkansas Highway 43
- California State Route 43
- Connecticut Route 43
- Florida State Road 43
  - County Road 43 (Manatee County, Florida)
- Georgia State Route 43
  - Georgia State Route 43 (former)
- Idaho State Highway 43
- Illinois Route 43
- Indiana State Road 43
- K-43 (Kansas highway)
- Kentucky Route 43
- Louisiana Highway 43
- Maine State Route 43
- Maryland Route 43
- Massachusetts Route 43
- M-43 (Michigan highway)
- Minnesota State Highway 43
- Mississippi Highway 43
- Missouri Route 43
- Montana Highway 43
- Nebraska Highway 43
  - Nebraska Spur 43A
- Nevada State Route 43 (former)
- New Hampshire Route 43
- New Jersey Route 43 (former)
  - County Route 43 (Monmouth County, New Jersey)
- New York State Route 43
  - County Route 43B (Cayuga County, New York)
  - County Route 43 (Chautauqua County, New York)
  - County Route 43 (Dutchess County, New York)
  - County Route 43 (Erie County, New York)
  - County Route 43 (Genesee County, New York)
  - County Route 43 (Lewis County, New York)
  - County Route 43 (Madison County, New York)
  - County Route 43 (Ontario County, New York)
  - County Route 43 (Otsego County, New York)
  - County Route 43 (Putnam County, New York)
  - County Route 43 (Rensselaer County, New York)
  - County Route 43 (Saratoga County, New York)
  - County Route 43 (Schenectady County, New York)
  - County Route 43 (St. Lawrence County, New York)
  - County Route 43 (Suffolk County, New York)
  - County Route 43 (Sullivan County, New York)
  - County Route 43 (Tioga County, New York)
  - County Route 43 (Ulster County, New York)
  - County Route 43 (Washington County, New York)
- North Carolina Highway 43
- North Dakota Highway 43
- Ohio State Route 43
- Oklahoma State Highway 43
- Oregon Route 43
- Pennsylvania Route 43
- South Dakota Highway 43
- Tennessee State Route 43
- Texas State Highway 43
  - Texas State Highway Loop 43
  - Farm to Market Road 43
  - Texas Park Road 43
- Utah State Route 43
- Virginia State Route 43
- West Virginia Route 43
- Wisconsin Highway 43 (former)

== See also ==
- A43 (disambiguation)#Roads

Preceded by 42	Lists of highways 43	Succeeded by 44
