= Lockheed F-94 Starfire =

Series of all-weather interceptor aircraft

F-94 Starfire
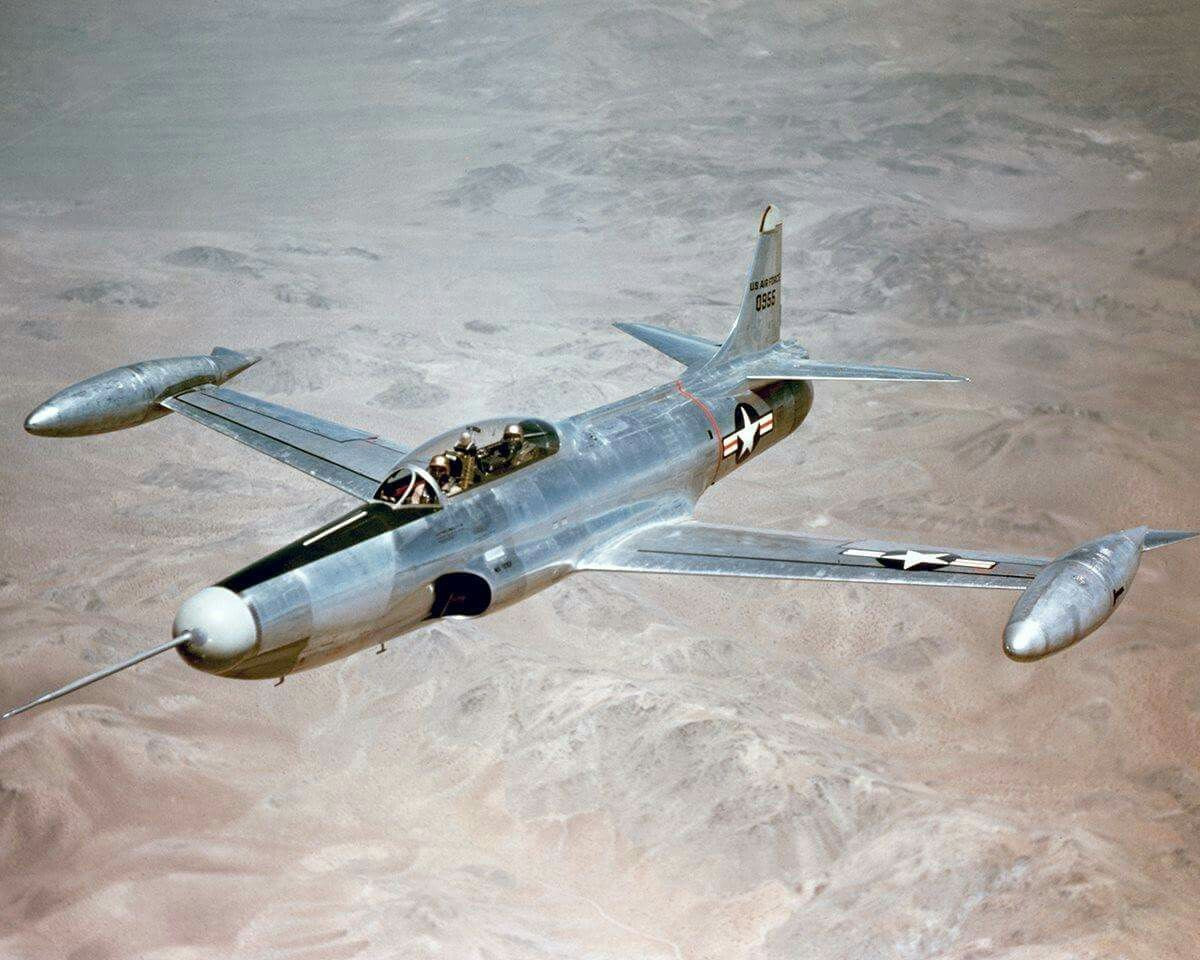
- A U.S. Air Force YF-97 Starfire on test flight; later to be redesignated the F-94C

General information
- Type: All-weather interceptor
- National origin: United States
- Manufacturer: Lockheed Corporation
- Primary users: United States Air Force Air National Guard
- Number built: 855

History
- Manufactured: 1949–1954
- Introduction date: May 1950
- First flight: 16 April 1949
- Retired: 1958 (USAF); 1959 (ANG)
- Developed from: Lockheed T-33 Shooting Star

The Lockheed F-94 Starfire is a first-generation jet-powered all-weather day/night interceptor aircraft designed and produced by Lockheed Corporation. Put into production in 1949, it was the first operational United States Air Force (USAF) fighter equipped with an afterburner as well as being the first jet-powered all-weather fighter to enter combat during the Korean War.

The F-94 was developed to fulfil a specification issued by the USAF in 1948, seeking a new interceptor capable of day and night operations to replace its piston-engined types in light of recent military advances made by the Soviet Union. The F-94 was derived from the successful Lockheed T-33 Shooting Star trainer; being a relatively simple conversion from an established aircraft led to USAF officials viewing it as a low-risk option and opting to procure the type. Maintaining a high level of parts commonality with the preceding aircraft, the majority of the F-94's external changes were related to the adoption of a larger nose that accommodated multiple guns, radar, and an automatic fire-control system. Engine thrust was also bolstered by adding an afterburner to the Allison J33 powerplant used.

On 16 April 1949, the prototype YF-94 conducted its maiden flight. While teething problems were encountered, these were overcome relatively quickly. During May 1950, the F-94A reached operational service with Air Defense Command (ADC), its principal operator, where the type soon replaced the piston-engined North American F-82 Twin Mustang in the all-weather interceptor role. It was soon followed by the F-94B, a refined model that proved to have greater engine reliability and a more spacious cockpit; the F-94C equipped with a thinner wing, a more powerful Pratt & Whitney J48 engine, and a new Hughes E-5 fire-control system also followed. Further models, including a dedicated aerial reconnaissance variant, were proposed but ultimately not pursued.

In the interceptor role, the F-94 proved to have less endurance and greater reliance upon Ground Control Interception methods than some of its piston-engined predecessors. Beyond its use by ADC, it was also operated by the Far East Air Force, which used the type against various Soviet-supplied aircraft during the Korean War of the early 1950s. The Alaskan Air Command (AAC) and the Air National Guard (ANG) also operated the F-94. It had a relatively brief operational life, the replacement process commencing in the mid-1950s in favor of more advanced fighters such as the Northrop F-89 Scorpion and North American F-86D Sabre. The last aircraft was withdrawn from USAF service in 1958, while the ANG opted to retire its F-94s only one year later.

== Design and development ==
=== Background ===
On 8 October 1948, the USAF issued a new general operating requirement that called for a radar-equipped interceptor to replace the aging Northrop F-61 Black Widow and North American F-82 Twin Mustang. This new interceptor was specifically designed to counter the emergence of new Soviet aircraft such as the Tupolev Tu-4 bomber (reverse engineered from the Boeing B-29 Superfortress). The Curtiss-Wright XF-87 Blackhawk had been developed with the intention of becoming the USAF's first jet-powered night fighter, but its performance was subpar. Accordingly, Lockheed was approached by the service with a request to design a jet night fighter on a crash program basis.

The resulting aircraft was derived from the TF-80C (later designated T-33A Shooting Star) which was a two-seat trainer version of the F-80 Shooting Star. Designated F-94 Starfire, it was redesigned with a lengthened nose area to accommodate the addition of guns, radar, and an automatic fire-control system. In November 1948, the P-94 was met with the approval of James Forrestal, United States Secretary of Defense. Having observed the conversion to be relatively straightforward, USAF officials chose to issue a letter contract to Lockheed during January 1949. Months later, a definitive contract for 150 production aircraft was received. By December 1949, the number on order had risen to 368 aircraft.

=== Into flight ===
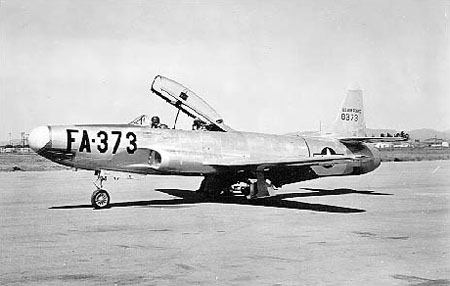
Lockheed YF-94 (S/N 48-373). This was the second aircraft built (from TF-80C)

On 16 April 1949, the first YF-94 prototype performed its maiden flight. To accelerate development, these early test aircraft were converted from existing T-33s; they maintained roughly 75% commonality in terms of components with those used in the earlier F-80 and T-33As. Flight testing determined the test aircraft to possess adequate performance. By the end of 1949, the program had been restructured to fulfil pressure from the USAF for more capable fighters; an more austere model, the F-94A, would be delivered quickest while a more capable and ambitious model, the F-94C, was produced.

The fire-control system selected for the F-94 was the Hughes E-1; this unit incorporated an AN/APG-33 radar (derived from the AN/APG-3, which directed the Convair B-36 Peacemaker's tail guns) and a Sperry A-1C computing gunsight. Due to the short range of this onboard radar system, it was useful only during the terminal phases of the interception mission; instead, the F-94 would largely be directed through traditional ground-controlled interception, akin to the preceding aircraft that it would replace.

The additional electronic equipment increased the weight of the aircraft, thus it required a more powerful engine. The Allison J33A-35 centrifugal turbojet engine, which had been installed as standard on the T-33A, was replaced with a more powerful afterburner-equipped model, the J-33-A-33. The F-94 was to be the first US production jet with an afterburner. The J33-A-33 had standard thrust of 4,000 pounds-force (18 kN), and with water injection this was increased to 5,400 lbf (24 kN) and with afterburning a maximum of 6,000 lbf (27 kN) thrust. The combination of added weight and the use of an afterburner considerably reduced the F-94's internal fuel capacity. The YF-94A's afterburner suffered numerous teething problems, typically related to its igniter and the flame stabilization system.

=== Production versions ===
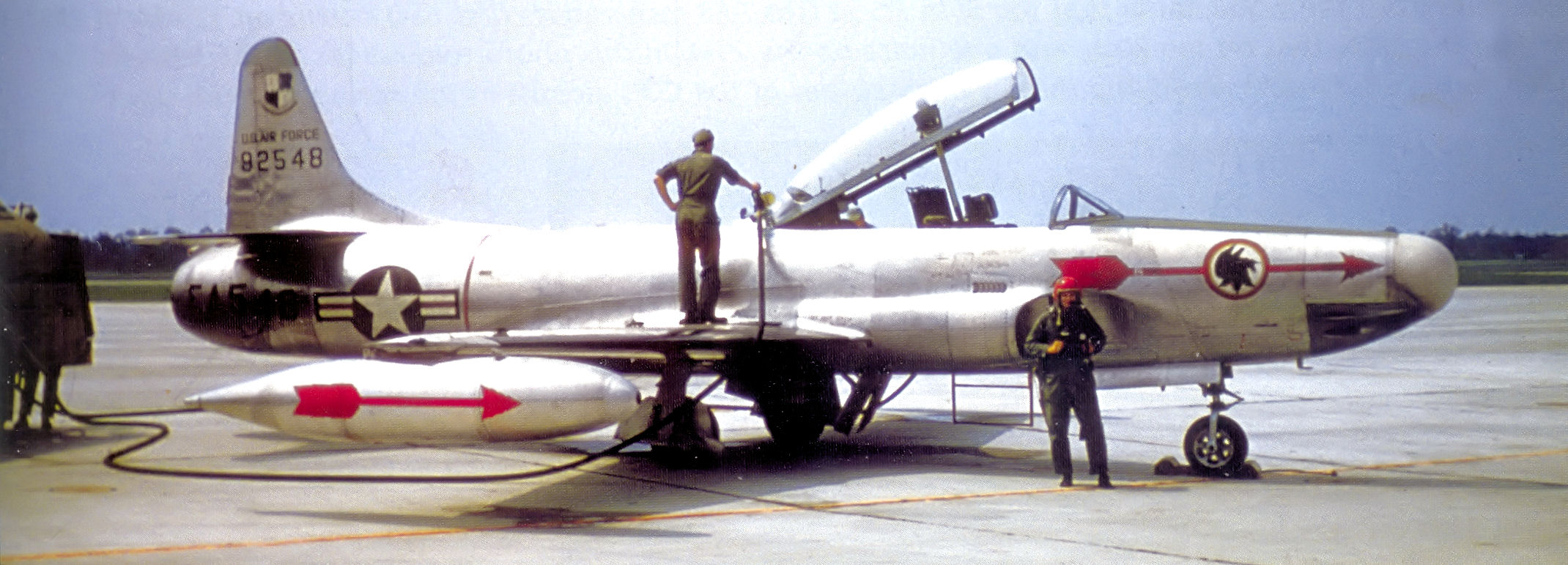
F-94A 49-2548, 2d Fighter-Interceptor Squadron, McGuire AFB, NJ

==== F-94A ====
The initial production model was the F-94A, which entered operational service in May 1950. Its armament was four 0.50 in (12.7 mm) M3 Browning machine guns mounted in the fuselage with the muzzles exiting just behind the radome. Two 165-US-gallon (620 L) drop tanks, as carried by the F-80 and T-33, could be carried beneath the wingtips. Alternatively, these could be replaced by 1,000-pound (450 kg) bombs, giving the aircraft a secondary fighter bomber role. 109 F-94As were produced. This model was only in operational service for a brief time as it was originally built and was not received well by its aircrews. The main source of complaints was its somewhat unreliable J33 engine, which frequently necessitated ground aborts and had been deemed by many crews to be unsafe. In flight, the aircraft was often judged to be unstable and difficult to maneuver when flown at high altitude by its pilots. The pilot and radar operator commonly found that the cockpit was too narrow for them to be able to quickly enter and exit the aircraft, which was routinely expected during alerts and scrambles. Furthermore, the clearance for the ejection seats was too small, resulting in several tragic accidents during emergency ejections.

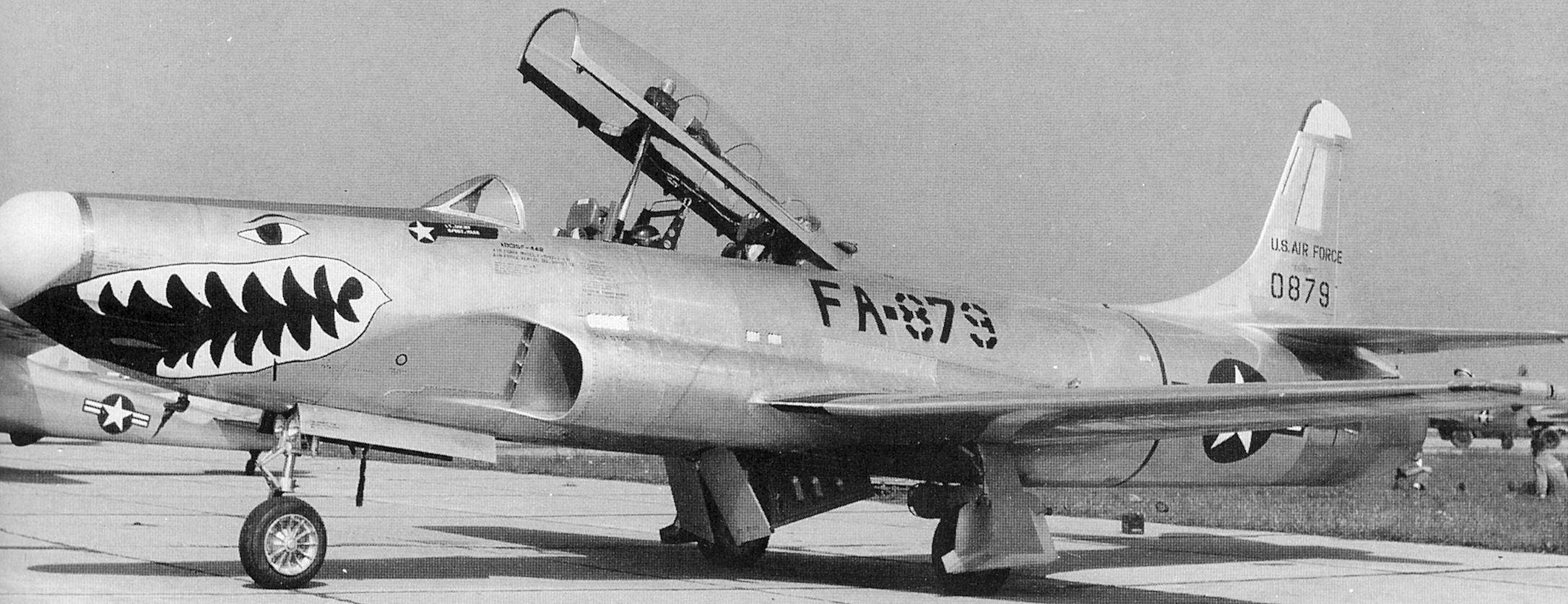
61st Fighter-Interceptor Squadron Lockheed F-94B 50-879

==== F-94B ====
During January 1951, the improved F-94B entered service; it was outwardly virtually identical to the F-94A. The Allison J33 engine had received several modifications to make it considerably more reliable. The pilot was also provided with a more roomy cockpit while the canopy was replaced by a redesigned unit with a bow frame in the center between the two crew members, along with a new Instrument Landing System (ILS). 356 F-94Bs were completed. It proved to be a fairly reliable aircraft, particularly in comparison to its predecessor, and encountered relatively few problems during its service life. This improved model quickly replaced the F-94As in service with the active-duty squadrons, after which these older aircraft were temporarily returned to Lockheed to be re-engined and rebuilt to F-94B standards. These upgraded F-94A/B aircraft were also modified with a twin-gun pod under each wing for two additional 0.50 in (12.7 mm) machine guns each, bringing the total to eight. These aircraft were then passed along to Air National Guard units where they served until the end of the 1950s.

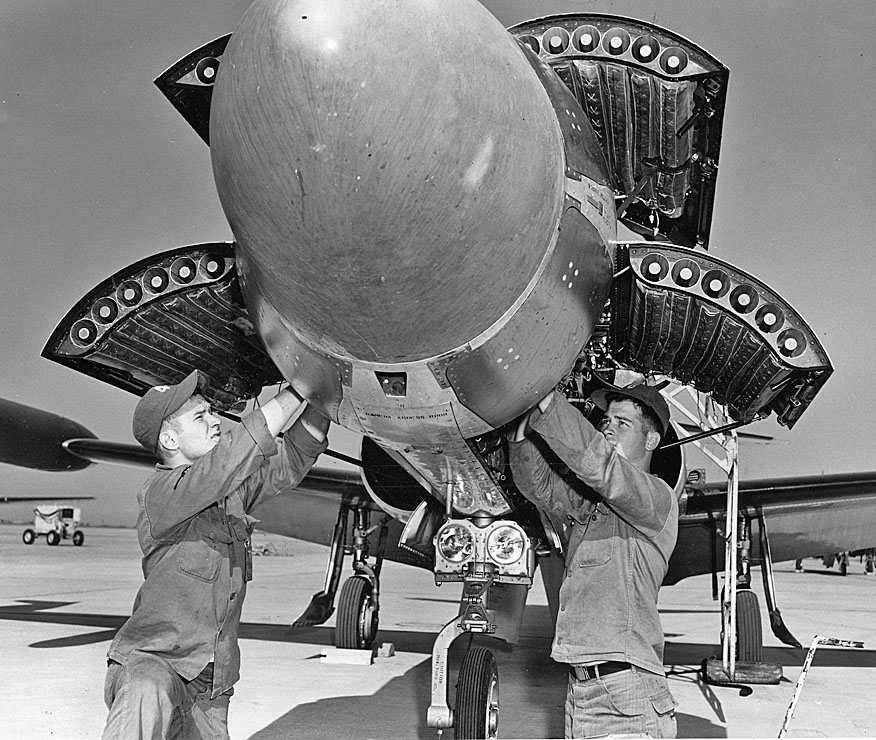
F-94C being armed with 2.75 in (70 mm) FFARs

==== F-94C ====
The F-94C Starfire was extensively modified from the early F-94 variants. In fact, it was initially designated F-97 before officials decided that it would be treated as a new version of the F-94 instead. At the time, USAF interest in the aircraft was allegedly lukewarm, thus Lockheed opted to fund development themselves, converting two F-94B airframes into YF-94C prototypes for evaluation. To improve performance, a completely new and much thinner wing was designed, along with a swept tail surface. The J33 engine was replaced with a more powerful Pratt & Whitney J48, a license-built version of the afterburning Rolls-Royce Tay, which dramatically increased power over the J33, producing a dry thrust of 6,350 lbf (28.2 kN) and approximately 8,750 lbf (38.9 kN) with afterburning. The fire control system was upgraded to the new Hughes E-5 with an AN/APG-40 radar, a change which required the use of a much larger nose. All of the guns were removed and replaced with all-rocket armament consisting of four groups of six rockets in a ring around the nose. These rockets were carried in four panels that could be hinged upwards and outwards for ground reloading. In flight, these rockets were normally hidden aft of four inwards-folding doors that surrounded the nose cone. According to Lockheed test pilot Tony LeVier, the F-94C was capable of supersonic flight in a steep dive with afterburner engaged.

The F-94C was the only variant to be officially named Starfire. With time, the entire F-94 family has adopted the name. The first production F-94C aircraft were delivered in July 1951, 387 examples being delivered before May 1954. The largest problem discovered in service was the nose-mounted rockets, which blinded the crew with their smoke and fire. The most severe problem associated with firing the nose-mounted rockets was that the exhaust could cause a flameout of the jet engine, which could lead to the loss of the aircraft. After the 100th aircraft, mid-wing rocket pods were added to the leading edges, similar in concept to the previous gun pods, holding 12 rockets apiece and fitted with a frangible aerodynamic nose cap which was discarded when firing the rockets. Most of the time, the nose rockets were not fitted, and the mid-wing pod rockets were the sole armament. This version of the aircraft was extensively used within the Semi Automatic Ground Environment (SAGE) air defense system.

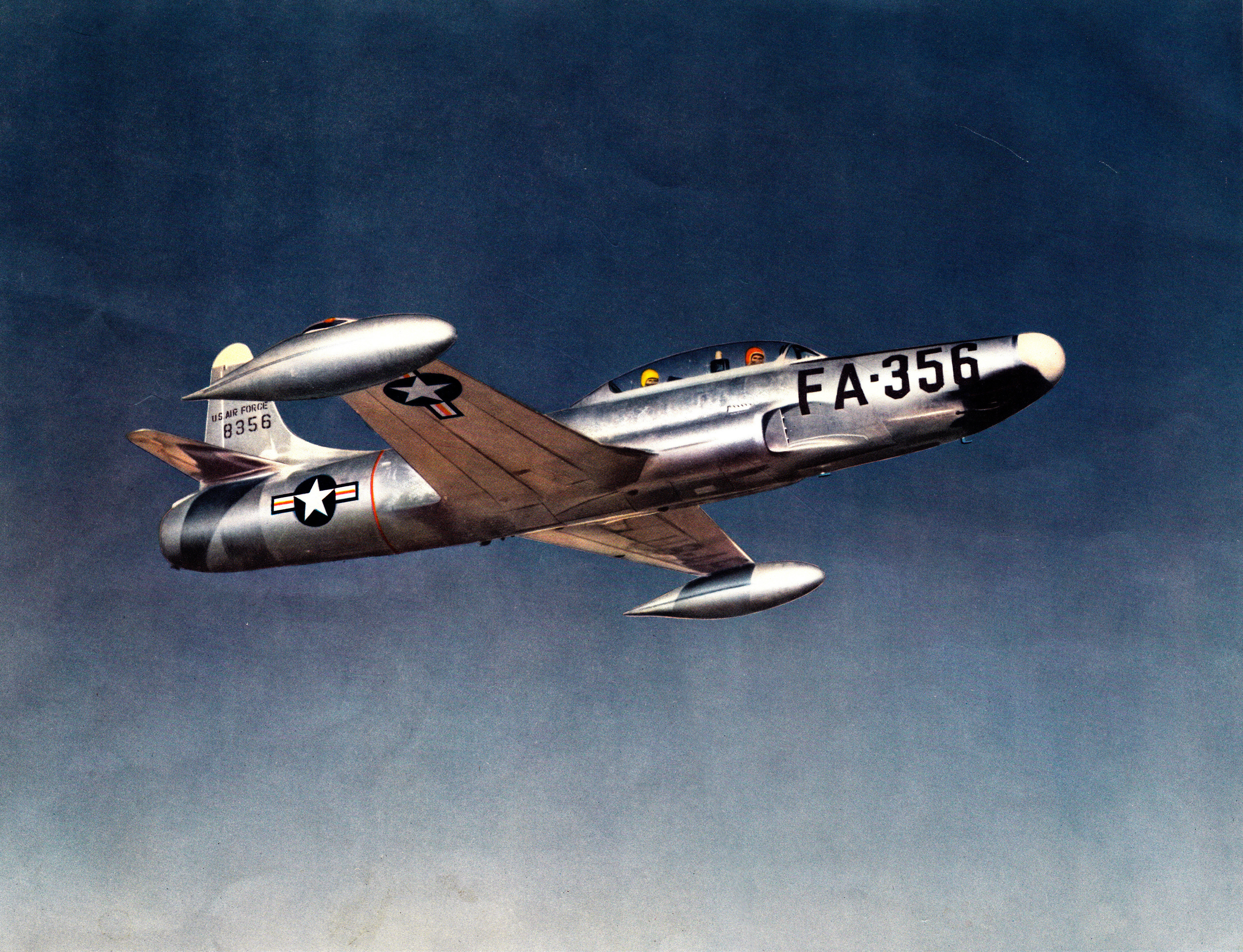
F-94 FA-356

==== F-94D ====
An F-94D model was proposed as a single-seat fighter bomber, being armed with both bombs and rockets under the wings as well as eight nose-mounted machine guns. A single prototype was built, but the model was not ultimately accepted for production. The prototype was later used as a testbed for the 20 mm (0.79 in) M61 Vulcan cannon subsequently used on the Lockheed F-104 Starfighter and many other combat aircraft.

== Operational history ==
=== Air Defense Command ===
The primary users of the F-94 were the squadrons of Air Defense Command (ADC), eventually equipping 26 squadrons of interceptors. The first F-94As were assigned to the 325th Fighter-All Weather Group at McChord AFB and Moses Lake AFB, Washington. It replaced the propeller-driven F-82F Twin Mustangs that were in use by its 317th, 318th, and 319th squadrons. The F-82s had been pressed into interceptor service in 1949 after the Soviet Union displayed the Tupolev Tu-4 strategic bomber, a reversed-engineered version of the B-29 Superfortress, some of which had landed and were impounded in the Soviet Far East during World War II. The F-82Fs proved to be an excellent day/night all-weather interceptor, with long range, but it lacked any logistics support which resulted in a chronic shortage of parts. The jet-powered F-94As, however, had shorter legs than the F-82s and relied more on Ground Control Interception Radar (GCI) sites to vector them to intruding aircraft.

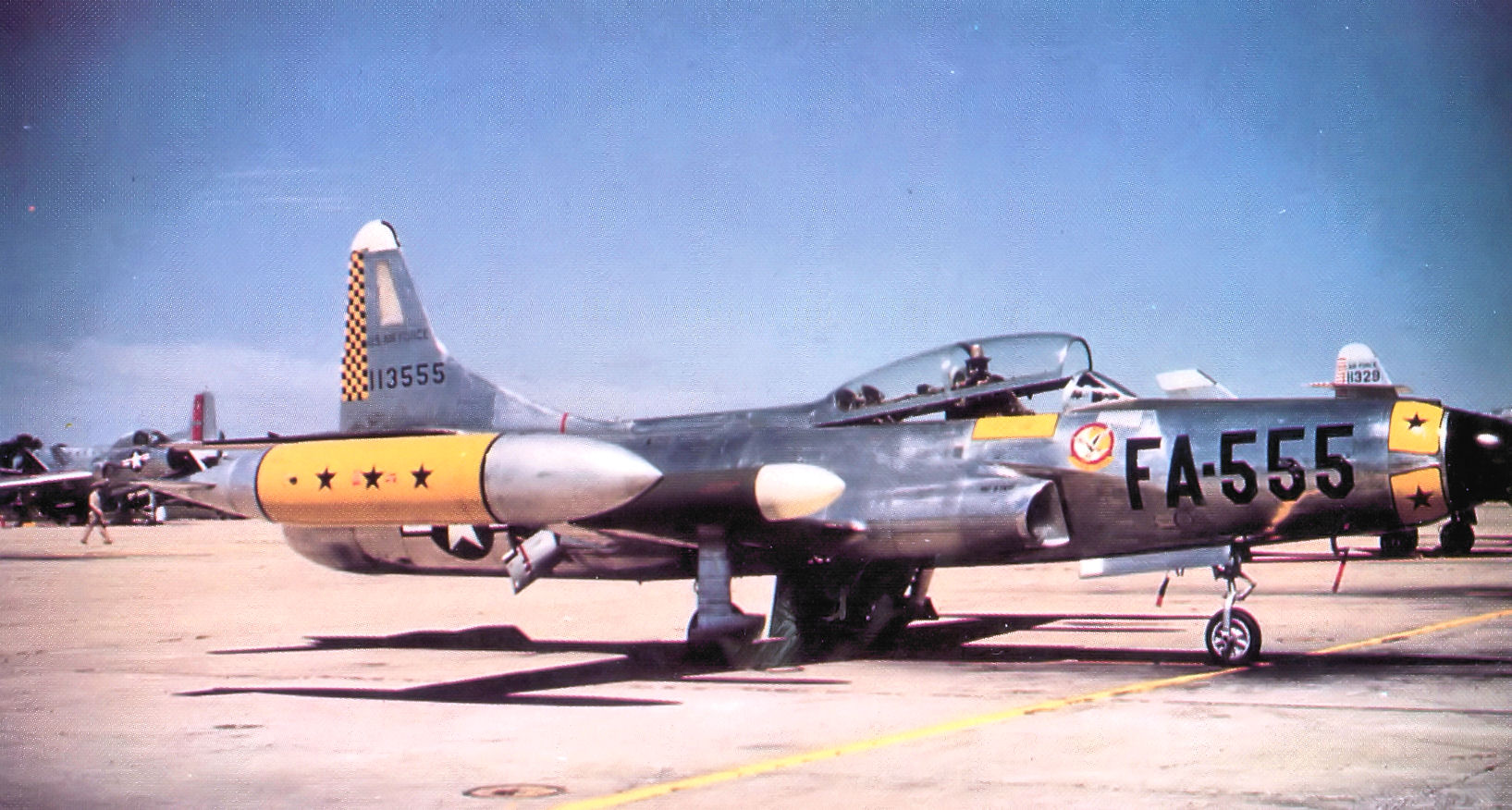
27th FIS F-94C 51-13555 at Griffiss Air Force Base, New York

Once the 317th was equipped in the Pacific Northwest, ADC then re-equipped its 52d Fighter-All Weather Group at McGuire AFB, New Jersey which also flew F-82Fs and provided air defense of the Northeastern United States. However, it was during this period that Air Defense Command began dispersing its Fighter-Interceptor squadrons away from their parent groups to individual bases. During 1950 and 1951, ADC sent F-94As to squadrons of the 56th Fighter Group in the upper Midwest to replace its obsolete F-47 Thunderbolts, F-51 Mustangs, as well as F-80 Shooting Star and F-86A Sabre day jet interceptors.

In March 1951, upgraded F-94Bs were received from Lockheed by the 33d Fighter Wing at Otis AFB, Massachusetts, replacing their F-86A Sabres, although the last squadron of the wing didn't replace its Sabres until May 1952. Three Federalized Air National Guard units, the 121st FIS (DC ANG), 142nd FIS (Maine ANG), and 148th FIS (Pennsylvania ANG), received F-94Bs while they served on active duty during the Korean War call-up to defend the airspace over Washington, D.C. However, these F-94s were retained by the USAF when these ANG squadrons returned to State control in 1952. Also seven more squadrons received F-94Bs as part of the roll out from Lockheed.

Three additional squadrons (84th, 436th, and 479th FIS) received F-94Bs in 1953, although these were passed down from squadrons receiving F-94Cs. Beginning in the summer of 1951, the F-94Cs began coming off the production line, with six squadrons being equipped by May 1954. Five more squadrons were equipped in FY 54-55 which ended the production run for the interceptor by Lockheed.

=== Far East Air Force ===
In the Pacific, Far East Air Force (FEAF) equipped three squadrons with F-94Bs, and Air Defense Command deployed the 319th Fighter-Interceptor Squadron to South Korea to provide a jet air-defense umbrella over the Seoul area.

The first shipment of F-94Bs arrived in Japan in March 1951, being assigned to the 339th Fighter-All Weather Squadron at Johnson Air Base. Also arriving was a mobile training unit from Chanute AFB, Illinois to provide transition training for the F-82G Twin Mustang pilots into the new jet interceptor. In May, F-94Bs began to re-equip the 68th FAWS at Itazuke Air Base, while rotating pilots and radar operators to Suwon Air Base in South Korea where they flew combat missions over North Korea with the F-82Gs as well as air defense alert over Seoul. In July, the 4th FAWS began receiving the F-94As at Naha Air Base, Okinawa. Training for the squadrons proceeded through the summer and in August, the first Fifth Air Force Operational Readiness Test was held by the 339th FAWS with the F-94. Various issues with the aircraft, as well as issues with the Ground Control Interception radar graded the test as "fair".

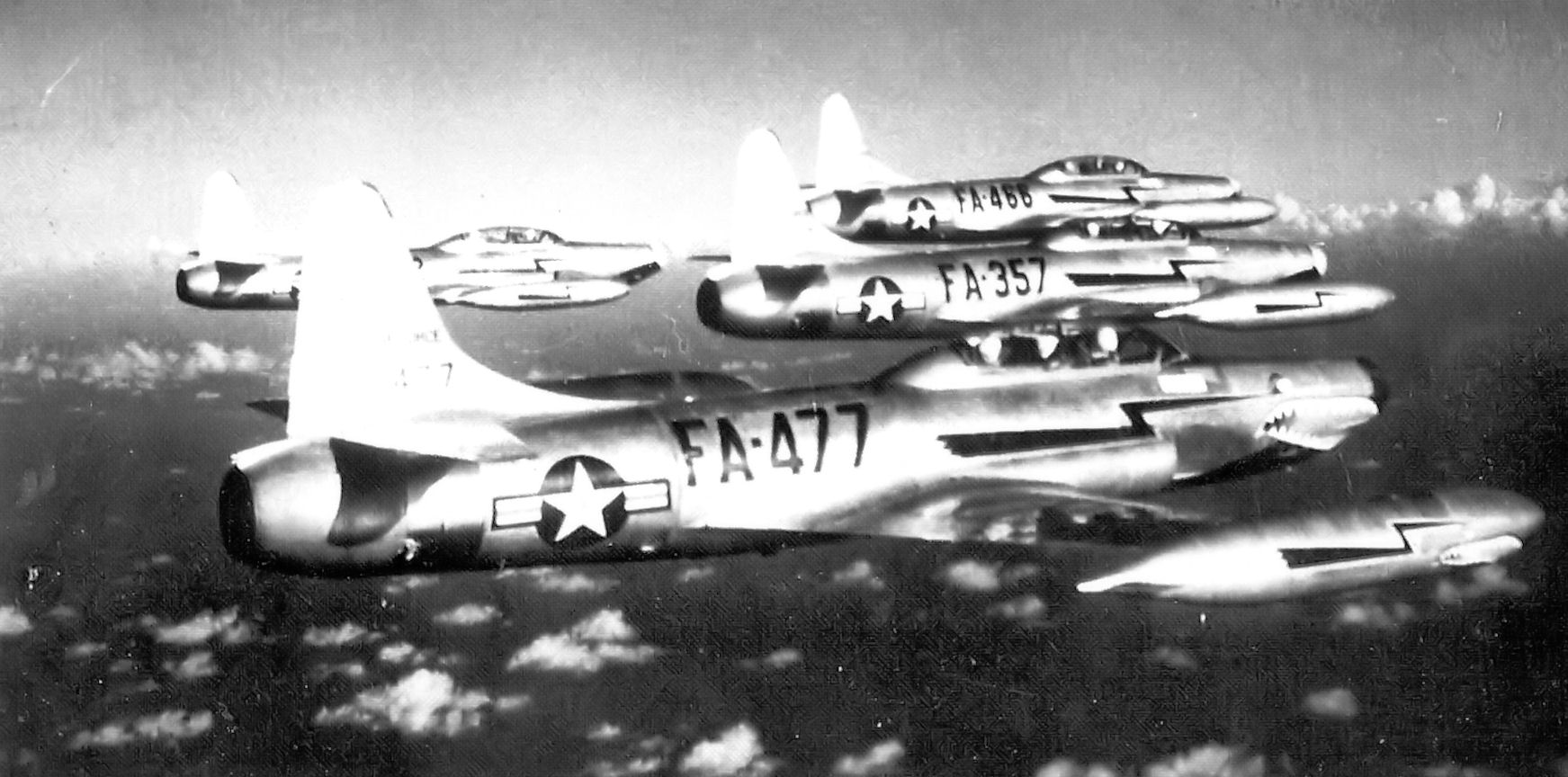
Formation of 4th FIS F-94Bs, Naha AB, Okinawa

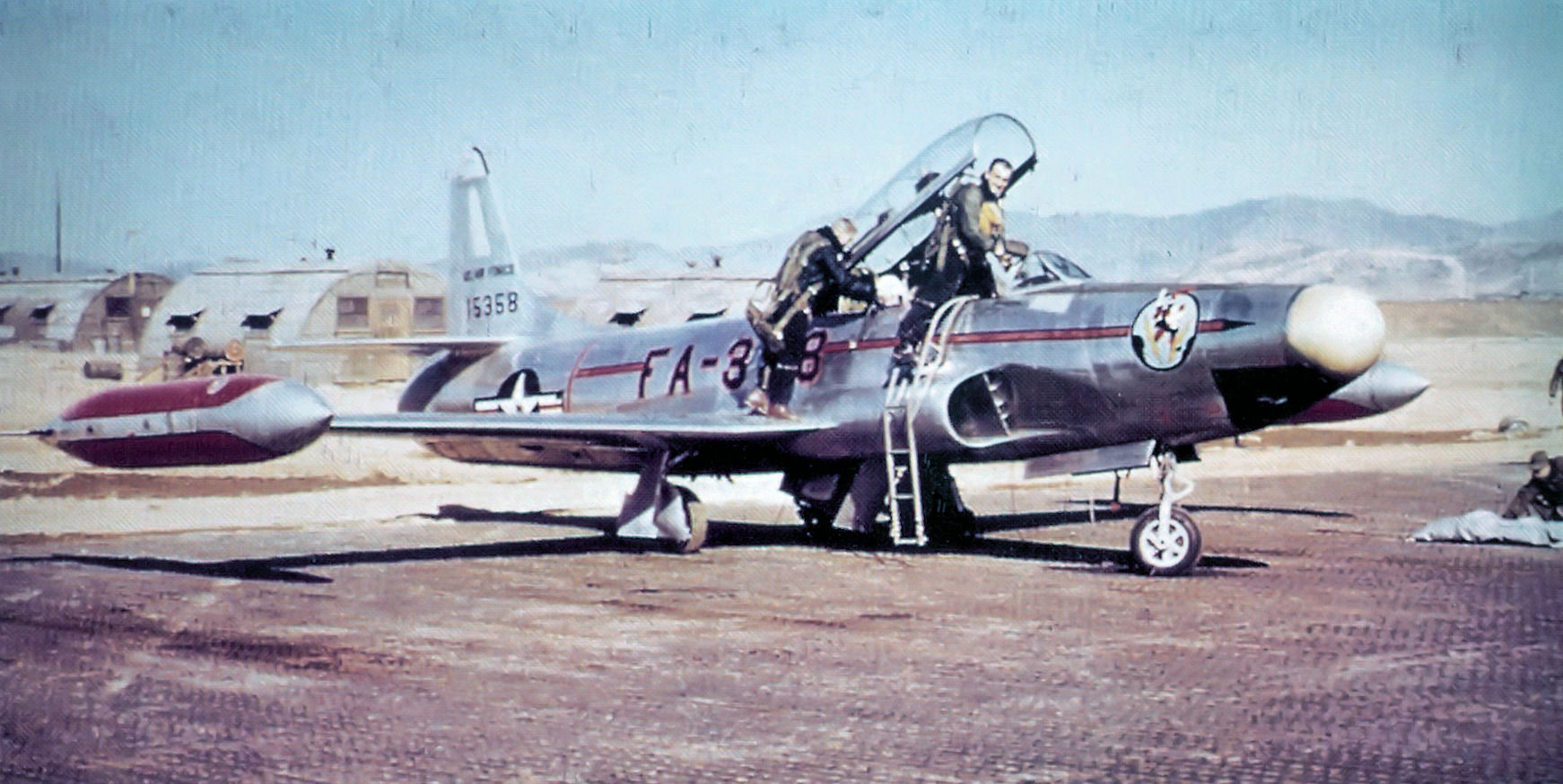
68th Fighter-Interceptor Squadron F-94B 51-5358 at Suwon AB, South Korea

In early December 1951, the appearance of Communist MiG-15 jets over Seoul raised alarm bells at FEAF Headquarters. The only interceptors over Seoul were about six F-82Gs along with some Marine Grumman F7F Tigercats. FEAF ordered the 68th to move two F-94Bs to Suwon to supplement the F-82s. The F-82s along with the F7Fs would continue their armed reconnaissance and weather missions against North Korean targets, while the F-94s would fly interception missions over South Korea and the Yellow Sea. Care was taken to not fly the Starfires anywhere that a crash would allow the communists access to the wreck if it were shot down.

During January 1952, ADC was ordered to deploy the 319th Fighter-Interceptor Squadron from the 25th Air Division at Larson AFB, Washington to Japan, and to relieve the 68th FIS at Itazuke. A detachment of the ADC squadron was sent to Misawa AB to fly air defense missions over Northern Honshu and Hokkaido against any intruding Soviet aircraft from Sakhalin Island or the Vladivostok area. At Suwon, the 68th had a total of fifty-eight interceptions during February during nighttime hours. It was in February 1952 that the first F-94 was lost in a night interception while pursuing an unknown aircraft over the Yellow Sea. The cause of the loss was unknown. However, a B-26 pilot observed an explosion in the air between the island of Taeyonp'yong-do and the city of Haeju in North Korea. A search was made for the aircraft and crew, which continued for almost three months. It was finally concluded the aircraft had crashed and broken up over the Yellow Sea, with the wreckage settling in deep water and the classified equipment lost at sea.

In March 1952, the 319th FIS began flying operational missions at Suwon, providing Combat Air Patrols (CAPs) for B-29 missions at night. The 68th was relieved and reassigned to Japan, but would remain on one-hour alert for possible combat duty over Korea. In June, the first F-94 contacts against enemy jets was made and the interceptor crews believed at the time that the communists were testing radar-warning equipment. On several occasions just when they were ready to fire on the enemy aircraft, it would start evasive action that indicated the MiGs were equipped with a form of warning radar (as the F-94s were). Other intercepts would take place over North Korea and the F-94 was credited with several air-to-air victories, including the first jet-vs.-jet night victory against a MiG-15. One F-94 was listed as lost due to enemy action, six more to non-enemy causes on combat missions, two were declared as missing on a combat mission and three were lost in accidents. One F-94 was lost when it slowed to 110 miles per hour (180 km/h) during pursuit of a Po-2 biplane.

Following the Armistice in Korea in June 1953, the F-94s continued to fly air defense missions over Japan and South Korea. Beginning in 1954, the F-86D Sabre began replacing it in operational service. By the end of 1954, the Starfires had been returned to the United States for Air National Guard duty.

=== Alaskan Air Command ===
Immediately after World War II ended, most of the Eleventh Air Force in Alaska was withdrawn, and its assets were concentrated at two bases, Ladd AFB near Fairbanks and Elmendorf AFB near Anchorage. With the advent of the Soviet Tu-4 and its possession of the atomic bomb, US air defense assets were deployed to Alaska to guard against a Soviet attack on the United States coming from Siberia. Chains of Ground Control Radar sites were established under Alaskan Air Command (AAC), the postwar successor to Eleventh Air Force, and P-61 Black Widows were sent in 1948 as long distance interceptor aircraft. The F-82H Twin Mustang replaced the war-weary P-61s during 1949.

These propeller-driven interceptors were augmented in 1950 when the 449th Fighter-All Weather Squadron at Ladd AFB began receiving F-94As in mid-1950s. The squadron was divided into the F-82 flight and the F-94 flight as the jet interceptors doubled the squadron in size. In Anchorage, the 57th Fighter Group at Elmendorf AFB began sending its F-80C Shooting Stars back to the Continental United States in batches of four or five as they were replaced by the F-94As. Elmendorf AFB, being located close to the Gulf of Alaska in the south had much more moderate weather than Ladd AFB, located in Central Alaska where winter temperatures often fell below −40 °F (−40 °C). Hydraulic fluids would turn to jelly, and the engines in the jets would have starting problems. Extreme cold weather training for Air Force personnel assigned to Ladd AFB was mandatory in the event of an emergency ejection or even just being outside in the winter, losing a glove, and dropping a wrench or tool. Skin would freeze upon touching bare metal, and mechanics would have tools "welded" to their fingers at times.

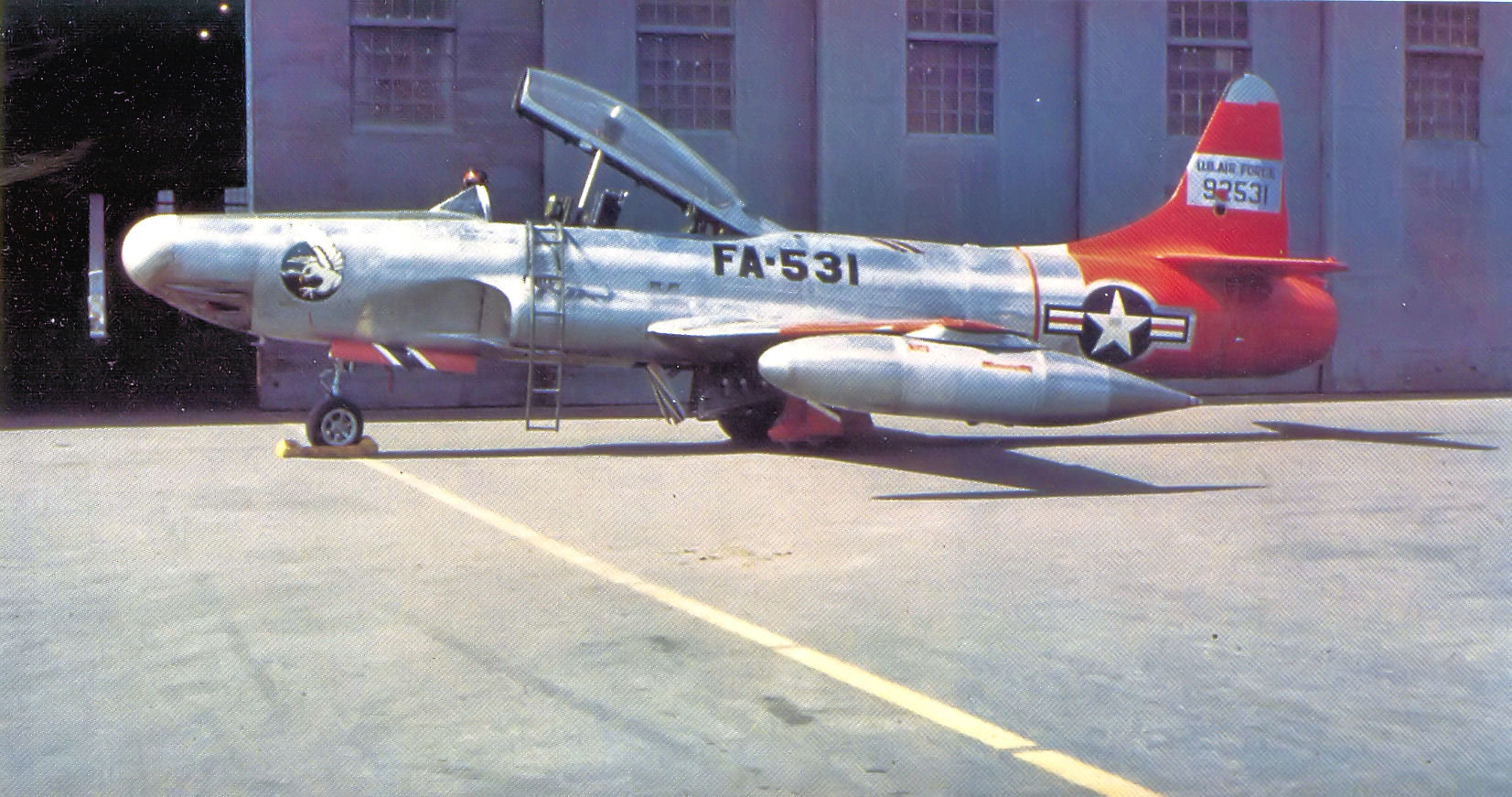
449th Fighter-Interceptor Squadron F-94A parked outside a hangar at Ladd AFB

The 449th utilized its F-82Hs as long-range reconnaissance aircraft along the Siberian coastline and the Chukchi Peninsula. Also the F-82s were flown in a ground support role during maneuvers with the Army forces. They would also drop bombs on frozen rivers to break up ice floes. For these missions, the F-94 was totally unsuitable and it also did not have the range for the long distance reconnaissance flights necessary to monitor the Siberian coast. Alaska was divided into two areas, the northern part under the 11th Air Division, headquartered at Ladd AFB, and had control of the GCI sites in the northern half of the territory. The 57th Fighter Group, based at Elmendorf AFB, was responsible for everything south. In April 1953, the 57th FIG was inactivated and the three squadrons F-94s at Elmendorf AFB became part of the 10th Air Division. Both the 449th FIS and the 57th FIG deployed the F-94s to advance airfields at Marks AFB, near Nome, along with King Salmon Airport and Galena AFB where it stood alert to respond to GCI intruder alerts for unknown aircraft detected intruding on Alaskan airspace.

The F-82Hs at Ladd were retired in the summer of 1953 when due to lack of logistics support, the aircraft became too unreliable to keep in the air. The 449th flew the F-94A until F-94Bs became available as hand-me-downs from Elmendorf AFB the 57th FIG was inactivated replaced by the 10th Air Division. There, the 10th AD received new North American F-86D Sabre interceptors. The 449th at Ladd sent their F-94As back to the CONUS and Air National Guard Service. By the end of 1954, it also was being re-equipped with F-86Ds, with the last of the Starfires also being sent to the Air National Guard.

=== Northeast Air Command ===
Northeast Air Command (NEAC) was a command formed in 1950 to administer US-controlled bases in the Maritime Provinces of Canada, that were under long-term lease going back to World War II. It was responsible for the defense of the northern approaches to North America and also to support transient aircraft of MATS and SAC, all of which came under the collective command and control of the 64th Air Division.

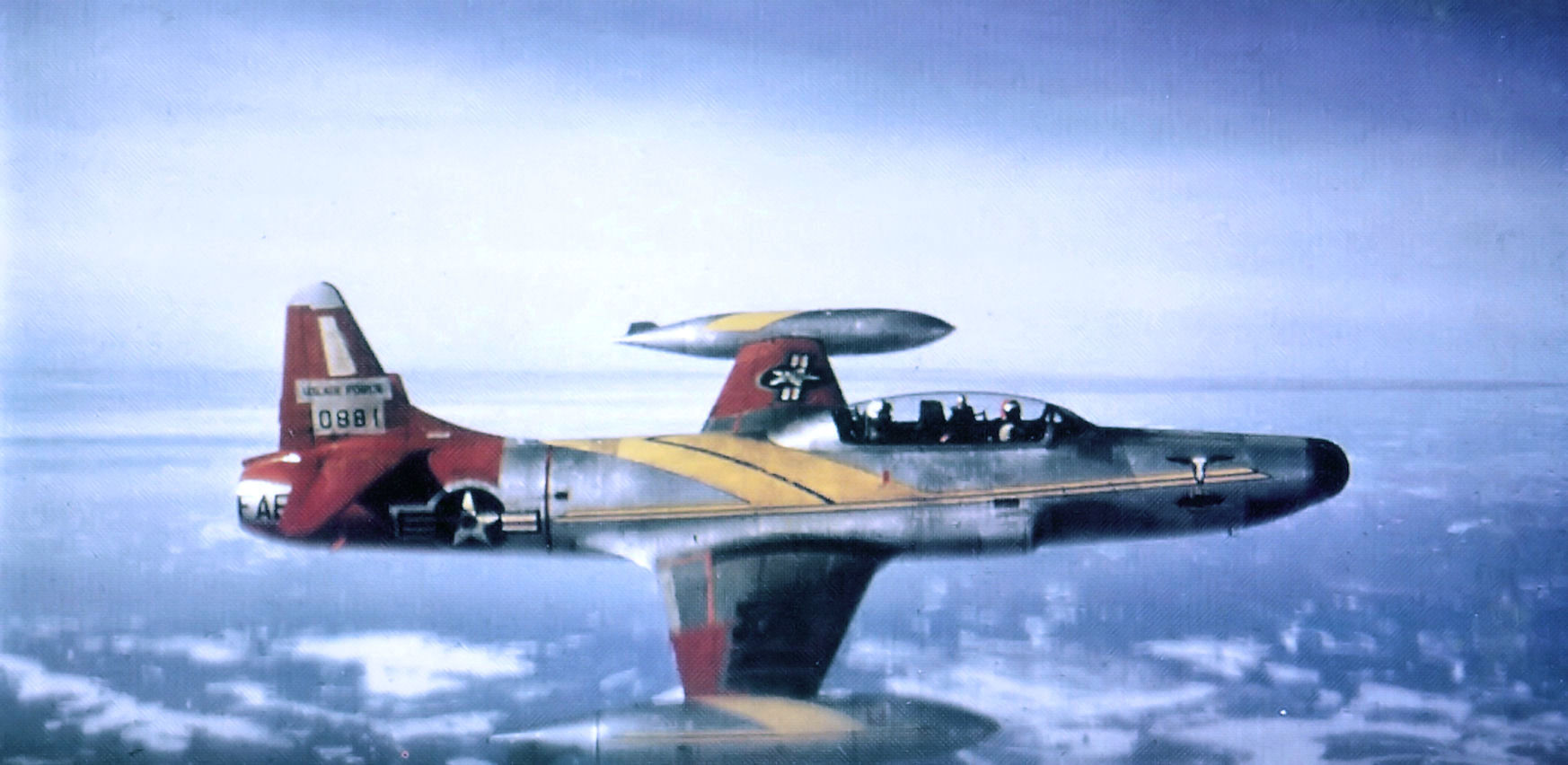
59th Fighter-Interceptor Squadron F-94B 50-881 flying over Labrador

During 1952, F-94Bs were sent to the 59th Fighter-Interceptor Squadron at Goose AFB, Labrador from Otis AFB, Massachusetts; furthermore, a detachment of the 59th was sent to Thule Air Base, Greenland to provide air defense of the area, although it was still under construction to back up the DEW Line. Thule was a staging base at the time for the SAC B-36 Peacemaker intercontinental bomber, which would proceed from there in wartime to targets in the Soviet Union using the great circle route over the North Pole. This was both the first F-89 squadron assigned to Canada and also the first squadron assigned to NEAC.

After the end of the Korean War, the 319th FIS, which was deployed from ADC to Japan in 1952, was transferred to NEAC in June 1953 and replaced the detachment of the 59th FIS at Thule. The third and last F-94 squadron assigned to NEAC was the 61st Fighter-Interceptor Squadron, which moved from Selfridge AFB, Michigan to Ernest Harmon AFB, Newfoundland in August 1953. Beginning in 1954, and continuing until 1957, the Starfires of NEAC were slowly replaced with versions of the F-89 Scorpion, although the Northrop interceptor didn't fully replace the Starfires until the 318th Fighter-Interceptor Squadron left Thule in April 1957.

Keflavik Airport, Iceland, although controlled by Military Air Transport Service (MATS), received F-94Bs as part of the 82d Fighter-Interceptor Squadron in April 1953. It provided air defense of Iceland until being relieved in October 1954 when it was reassigned to Presque Isle AFB, Maine. The Starfires were replaced by the 57th FIS and F-89C Scorpions.

=== Retirement ===
Beginning in mid-1954, the F-94A/B models were gradually replaced in the active-duty Air Force's inventory by a combination of the Northrop F-89C/D Scorpion and the North American F-86D Sabre interceptors. Withdrawn aircraft were typically sent to various Air National Guard (ANG) units where they replaced F-80C Shooting Stars and F-51D/H Mustangs, which in most cases marked the end of operational use for the venerable Mustang in United States military service. Prior to being delivered to the ANG, the F-94As were sent to Lockheed, where they received modifications to render them equivalent to F-94B standards, after which they entered use with the ANG. During the late 1950s, F-94Cs were progressively transferred across to the ANG as well, where they initially supplemented and eventually replaced the F-94A/B models. At the height of operations, a total of 22 ANG Fighter-Interceptor squadrons were equipped with Starfires.

During November 1957, the final F-94C was retired by the active-duty Air Force, the last examples being operated by the 319th Fighter-Interceptor Squadron at Bunker Hill Air Force Base, Indiana, before it converted to the F-89J Scorpion interceptor. The last F-94C Starfires were phased out of ANG service by the 179th Fighter-Interceptor Squadron at the Duluth Municipal Airport, Minnesota during the summer of 1959 when it converted to the F-89J Scorpion; the last aircraft being sent to AMARC in December 1959.

== Variants ==
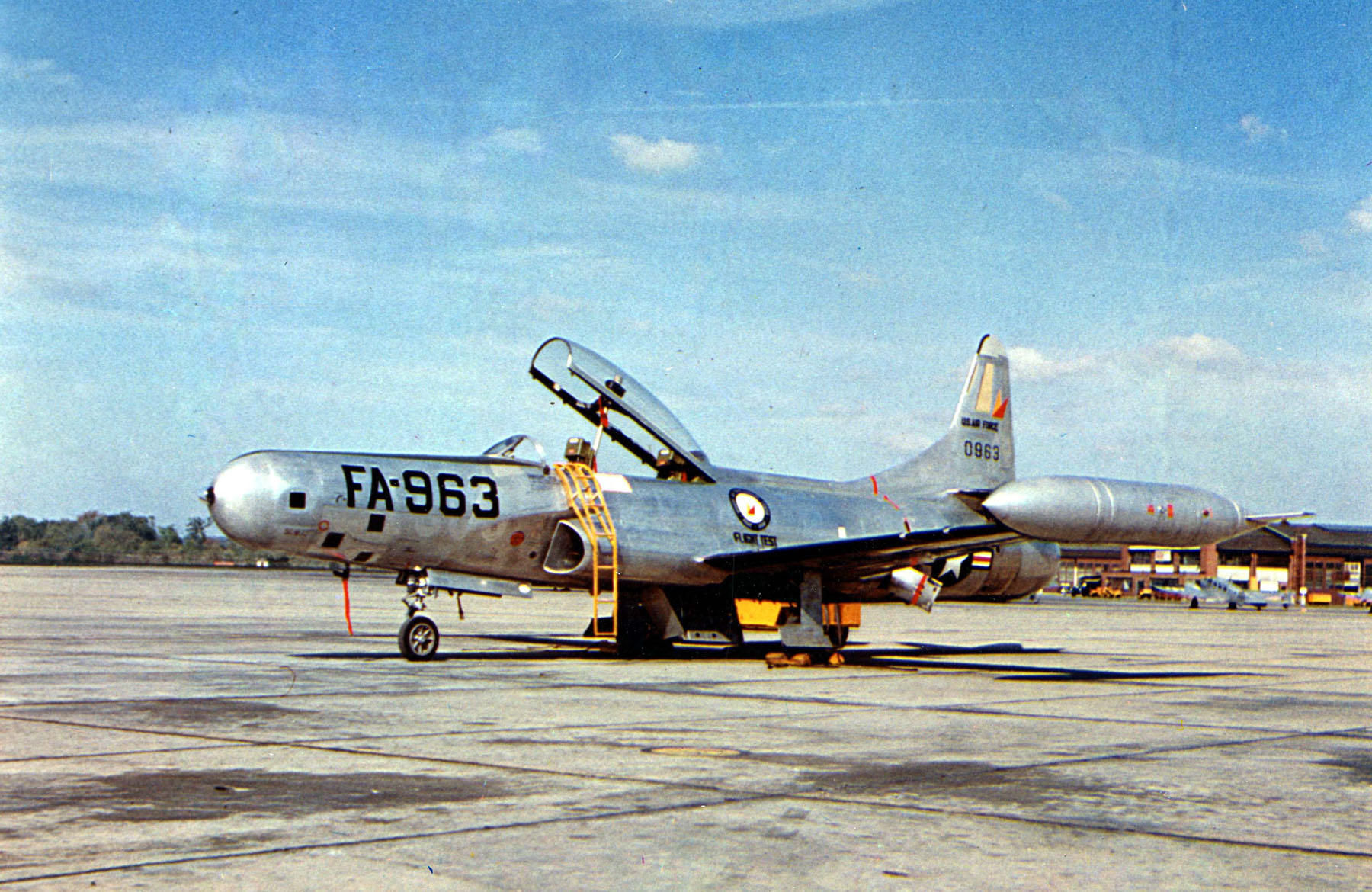
EF-94C 50-963 Photo-Reconnaissance Starfire

YF-94
TF-80Cs converted into YF-94 prototypes, two built.
F-94A
Initial production version, 109 built.
YF-94B
One F-94A modified on the production line with new flight director, modified hydraulic systems, and two enlarged wingtip tanks.
F-94B
Production model based on YF-94B, 355 built. (Note: Knaack claims that 356 F-94Bs were built)
YF-94C
F-94Bs modified with Pratt and Whitney J48 engine, leading edge rocket pods, and swept tailplane, originally designated YF-97A, two modified.
F-94C Starfire
Production version of the YF-94C with longer nose, gun armament replaced with nose mounted rockets, and provision for underfuselage JATO rockets, originally designated F-97A, 387 built.
EF-94C
Test aircraft for proposed aerial reconnaissance variant
YF-94D
Prototype single-seat close support fighter version based on the F-94C, one partly built but construction was abandoned when program was cancelled.
F-94D
Production version of the YF-94D, 112 on order cancelled, none built.
YF-97A
Original designation of the YF-94C.
F-97A
Original designation of the F-94C.

== Operators ==
United States
see: F-94 Starfire units of the United States Air Force

- United States Air Force
- Air National Guard

== Aircraft on display ==
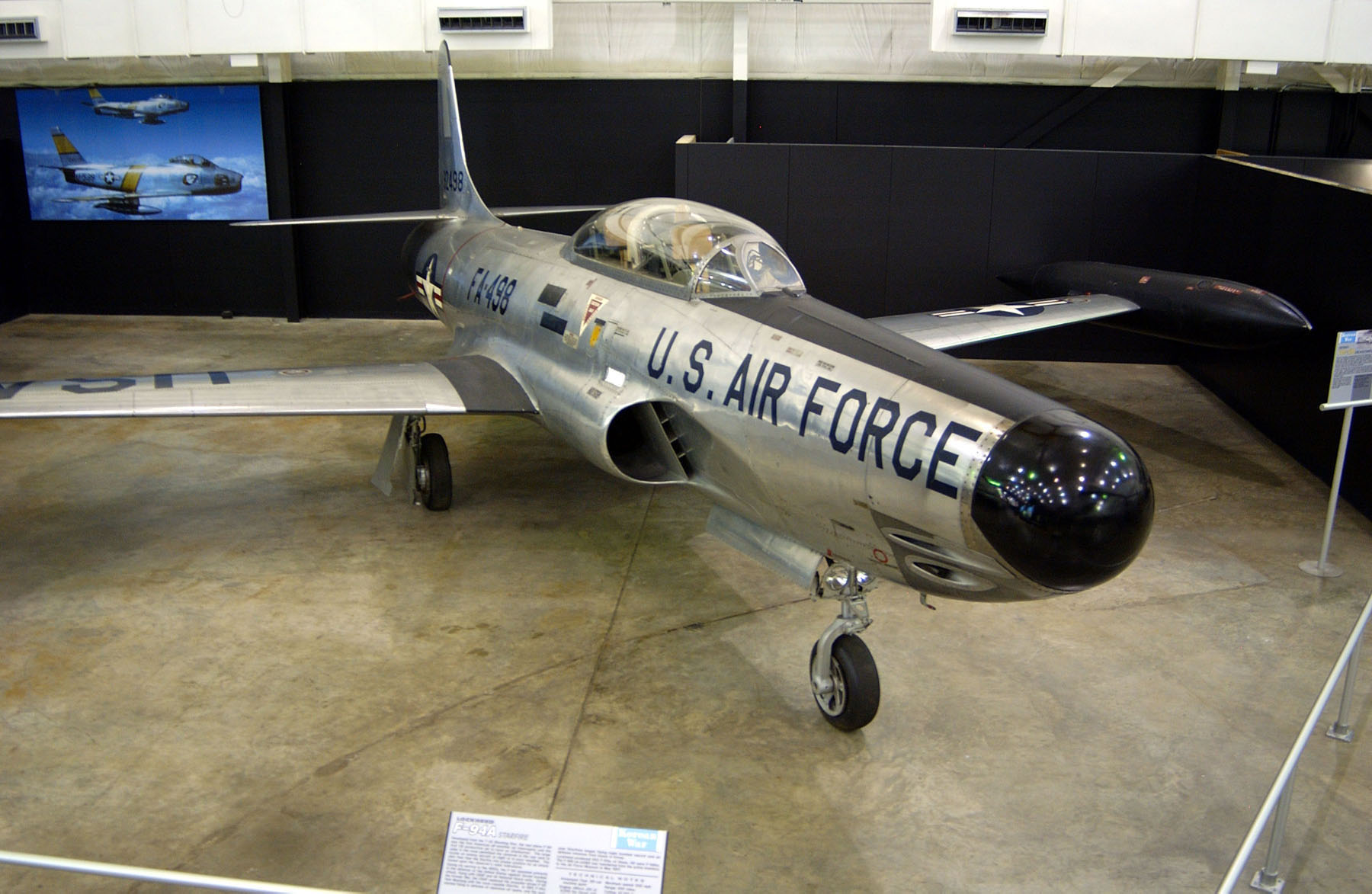
Lockheed F-94A (FA-498)

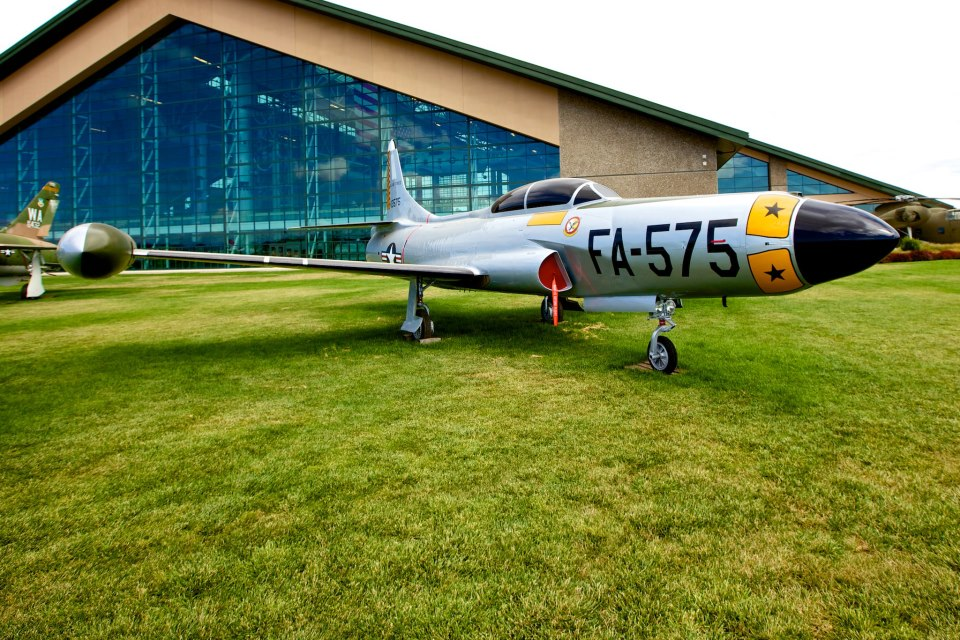
Lockheed F-94C (FA-575)

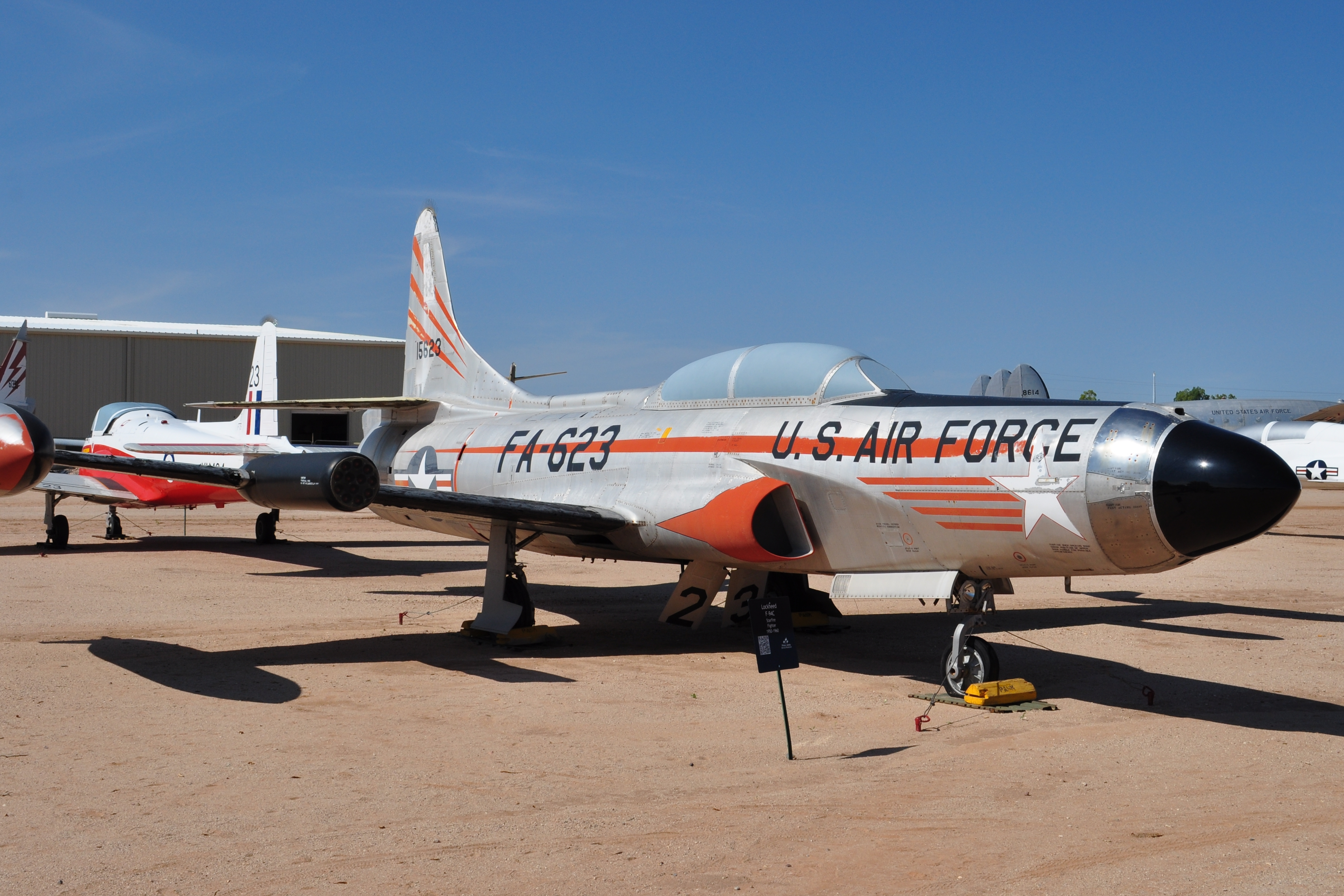
F-94C

YF-94A

- 48-356 – Air Force Flight Test Museum at Edwards Air Force Base in California. Formerly used as a gate guard at Lackland Air Force Base in San Antonio, Texas, currently in storage on Edwards AFB awaiting restoration and future display.

F-94A

- 0-80645 Mountain View Missouri; on view in Veterans Park.
- 49-2498 – National Museum of the United States Air Force at Wright-Patterson Air Force Base near Dayton, Ohio. It was transferred from active inventory to the Museum in May 1957.
- 49-2517 – Burlington Air National Guard Base at Burlington International Airport in Burlington, Vermont. Formerly displayed at the Pima Air and Space Museum adjacent to Davis-Monthan Air Force Base in Tucson, Arizona.

YF-97C/F-94C

- 50-0877 – stored for future display at Hancock Field Air National Guard Base, Syracuse, New York.
- 50-0980 – National Museum of the United States Air Force at Wright-Patterson Air Force Base near Dayton, Ohio. It is displayed as 50-1054.
- 50-1006 – Peterson Air & Space Museum at Peterson Air Force Base in Colorado Springs, Colorado.
- 51-4335 - Joint Base Cape Cod in Massachusetts, in tribute to General Chappie James.
- 51-5576 – American Legion Post 243 at Bessemer City, North Carolina.
- 51-5605 – North Dakota Air National Guard at Fargo Air National Guard Base, Hector International Airport, Fargo, North Dakota. Was moved from Duluth, Minnesota Memorial Park in October 1996. In Duluth from May 1960 to October 1996 marked as AF Ser. No. 51-3556.
- 51-5623 – Pima Air and Space Museum adjacent to Davis-Monthan Air Force Base in Tucson, Arizona
- 51-5671 – Erie County Memorial Gardens cemetery at Erie, Pennsylvania. It was first put on display in 1971. It was refurbished in 2005 and repainted again in 2021.
- 51-13563 – Minnesota Air National Guard Museum at Minneapolis, Minnesota.
- 51-13570 – American Legion Post 247 at the Iron World Discovery Center in Chisholm, Minnesota.
- 51-13575 – Evergreen Aviation & Space Museum in McMinnville, Oregon. It was previously on display at the New England Air Museum in Windsor Locks, Connecticut and moved to Evergreen in 2010.

== Specifications (F-94C Starfire) ==
3-view line drawing of the Lockheed F-94A Starfire

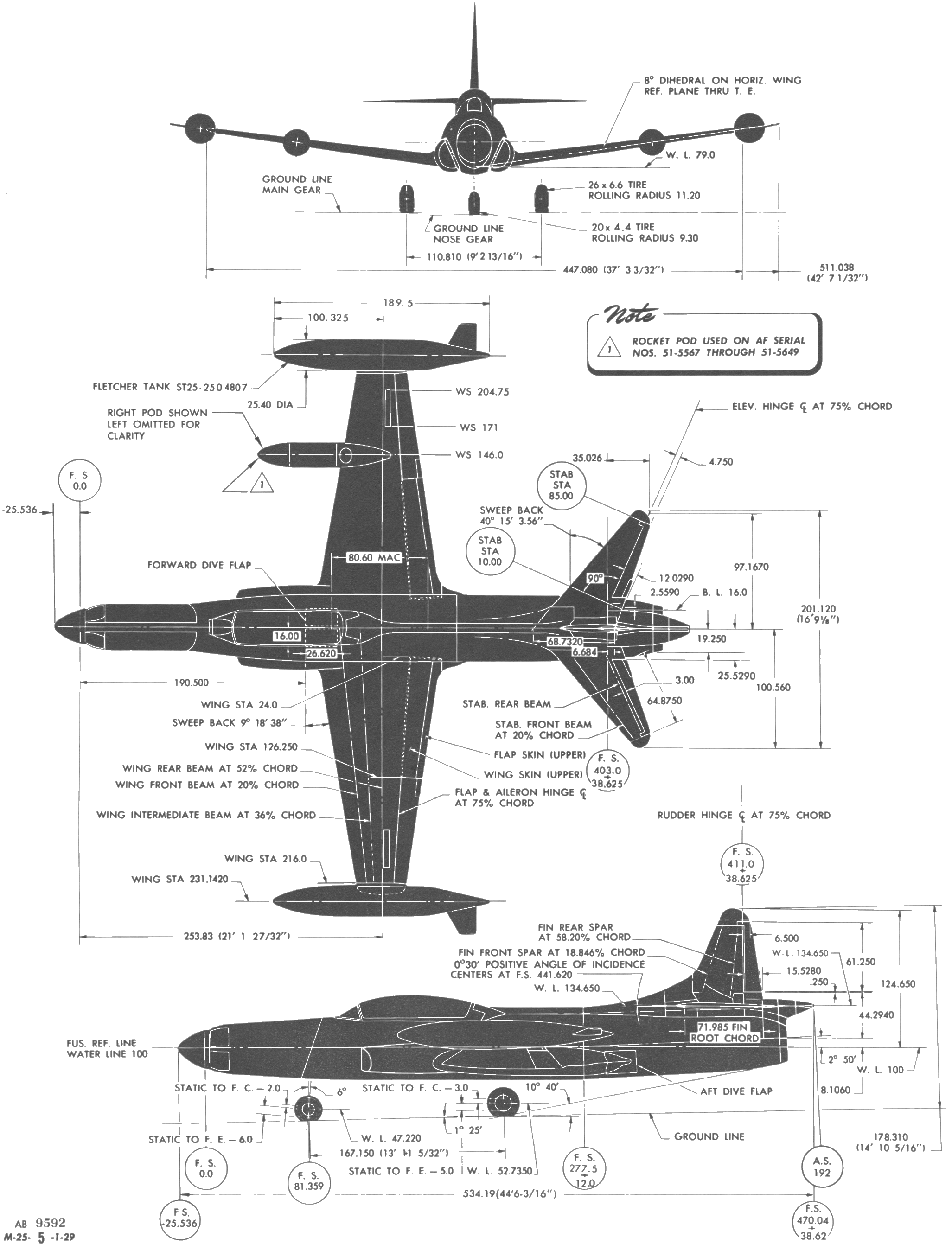
3-view silhouette of the Lockheed F-94C Starfire

External images
- F-94A Starfire
- F-94A Cut-Away Drawing
- F-94A Radar Indicator Screens

Data from RAF Flying Review

General characteristics

- Crew: 2
- Length: 44 ft 6 in (13.56 m)
- Wingspan: 42 ft 5 in (12.93 m)
- Height: 14 ft 11 in (4.55 m)
- Wing area: 232.8 sq ft (21.63 m^{2})
- Empty weight: 12,708 lb (5,764 kg)
- Gross weight: 18,300 lb (8,301 kg)
- Max takeoff weight: 24,184 lb (10,970 kg)
- Powerplant: 1 × Pratt & Whitney J48-P-5 centrifugal-flow turbojet engine, 6,350 lbf (28.2 kN) thrust dry, 8,750 lbf (38.9 kN) with afterburner

Performance

- Maximum speed: 640 mph (1,030 km/h, 560 kn)
- Maximum speed: Mach 0.84
- Range: 805 mi (1,296 km, 700 nmi)
- Ferry range: 1,275 mi (2,052 km, 1,108 nmi)
- Service ceiling: 51,400 ft (15,700 m)
- Rate of climb: 7,980 ft/min (40.5 m/s)
- Wing loading: 78.6 lb/sq ft (384 kg/m^{2})
- Thrust/weight: 0.48

Armament

- Rockets: 24 or 48 × 2.75 in (70 mm) Mk 4/Mk 40 Folding-Fin Aerial Rockets

Avionics

- AN/APG-40 radar

== See also ==
Related development

- Lockheed F-80 Shooting Star
- Lockheed T-33 Shooting Star

Aircraft of comparable role, configuration, and era

- Gloster Meteor (Armstrong Whitworth Meteor NF-11.12.13.14)
- North American F-86D Sabre
- McDonnell F2H Banshee
- Northrop F-89 Scorpion
- Yakovlev Yak-25

Related lists

- List of fighter aircraft
- List of Lockheed aircraft
- List of military aircraft of the United States
