= A43 =

A43 or A-43 may refer to:

== Military ==
- Curtiss A-43 Blackhawk, an American prototype aircraft
- Douglas A-43 Jetmaster, an American prototype aircraft
- Black Prince (tank), an experimental British heavy tank
- Advanced Landing Ground A-43, an airfield in France

== Roads ==
- A43 road, a primary road in the English Midlands
- A43 road (Northern Ireland), a primary road in Northern Ireland
- A43 autoroute, a French highway
- A 43, Bundesautobahn 43 in Germany

== Other uses ==
- HLA-A43, an HLA-A serotype
- Benoni Defense, a chess opening (by Encyclopaedia of Chess Openings code)
