= A42 =

A42 may refer to:

- A42 road (England), a road connecting Kegworth and Appleby Magna
- A42 road (Northern Ireland), a road connecting Maghera and Carnlough
- A42 motorway (France), a road connecting Lyon and Pont-d'Ain
- A 42 motorway (Germany), a road connecting Kamp-Lintfort and Castrop-Rauxel
- A-42 motorway (Spain), a road connecting Madrid and Toledo

A.42 may refer to:

- Aero A.42, a Czechoslovak bomber aircraft
- A42 tank, a British War Office designation for the "Heavy Churchill" (Mk.XIII) tank
