= Northrop F-89 Scorpion =

American jet-powered all-weather interceptor aircraft

F-89 Scorpion
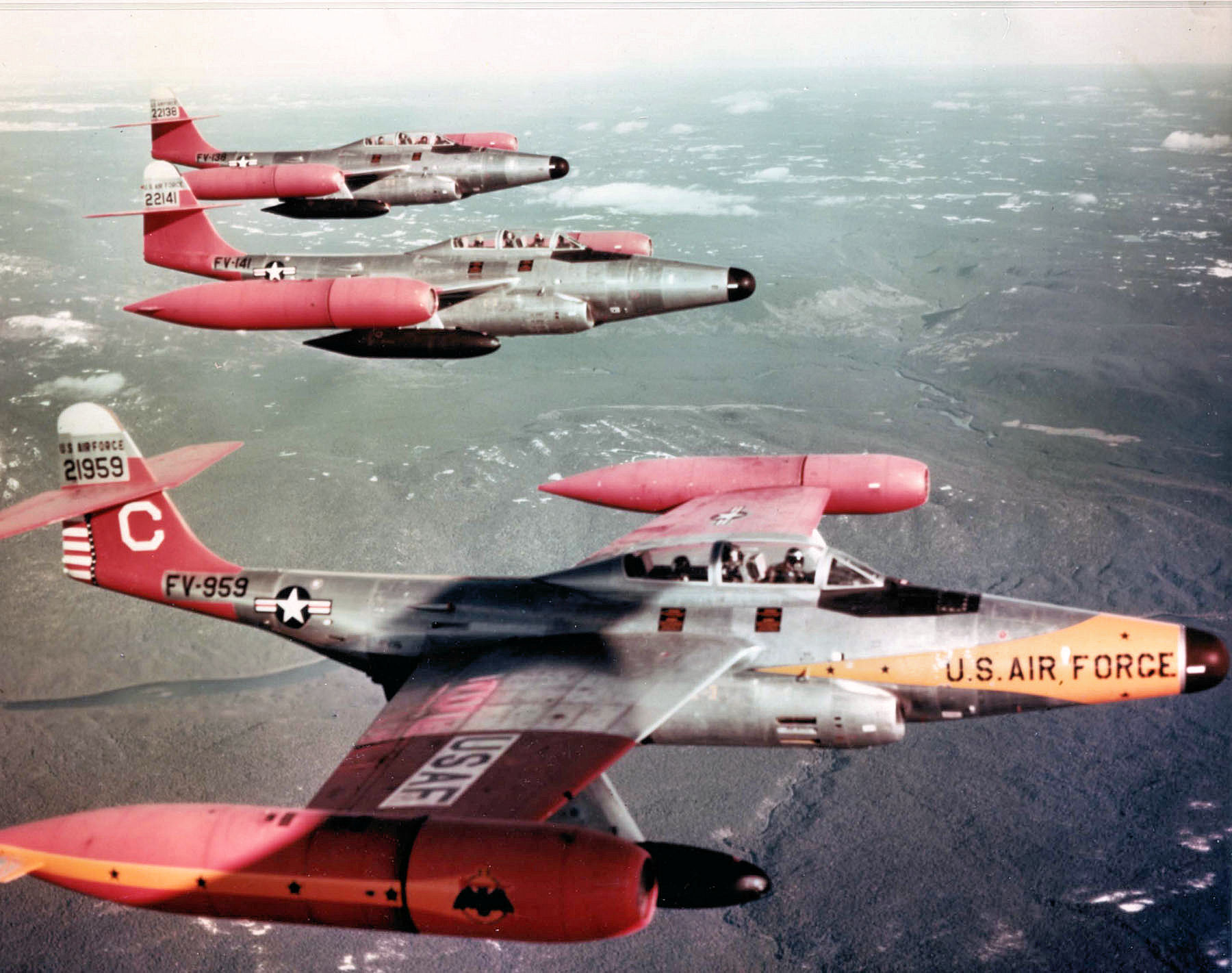
- Formation of three F-89Ds of the 59th Fighter Squadron, Goose Bay, Labrador

General information
- Type: Interceptor
- Manufacturer: Northrop Corporation
- Primary user: United States Air Force
- Number built: 1,050 and 2 prototypes

History
- Introduction date: September 1950
- First flight: 16 August 1948
- Retired: 1969

The Northrop F-89 Scorpion is an all-weather, twin-engined interceptor aircraft designed and produced by the American aircraft manufacturer Northrop Corporation. It was the first jet-powered aircraft designed as an interceptor to enter service, the first combat aircraft armed with air-to-air nuclear weapons, and among the first U.S. fighters to carry guided missiles. The name Scorpion came from the aircraft's elevated tail unit and high-mounted horizontal stabilizer, which kept it clear of the engine exhaust.

The Scorpion was designed by Northrop to a specification issued by the United States Army Air Forces (USAAF) during August 1945. Internally designated the N-24, it was originally designed with a relatively slim fuselage, buried Allison J35 turbojet engines, and a swept-wing configuration. The design was changed to a relatively thin straight wing that improved low-speed performance at the cost of top speed. In March 1946, the USAAF selected the N-24 for development, approving an initial contract for two aircraft, designated XP-89, on 13 June 1946.

On 16 August 1948, the prototype performed its maiden flight from Muroc Army Air Field. The XP-89 was found to be faster and more promising than the rival Curtiss-Wright XP-87 Blackhawk, which was consequently canceled. Various alterations and improvements were made after a fatal accident on 22 February 1950; officials had already specified the adoption of more powerful afterburner-equipped Allison J33-A-21 turbojet engines, AN/APG-33 radar, and the Hughes E-1 fire-control system. In September 1950, the Scorpion entered service with the United States Air Force (USAF), its sole operator.

Only 18 F-89As were completed; the variant was superseded in June 1951 by the F-89B configuration, which had better avionics and other improvements. It was soon followed by the F-89C, which had engine upgrades. In 1954, the definitive F-89D was introduced, which had a new Hughes E-6 fire control system with AN/APG-40 radar and an AN/APA-84 computer in place of the cannon armament, being instead armed with 2.75-inch (70 mm) "Mighty Mouse" FFAR rocket pods. The final variant to enter service was the F-89J, which was typically armed with the unguided AIR-2 Genie nuclear air-to-air rocket. They served with the Air Defense Command—later, the Aerospace Defense Command (ADC)—through 1959, and with the Air National Guard, into the late 1960s. The last Scorpions were withdrawn from use in 1969.

== Design and development ==
=== Background ===
The origins of the Scorpion can be traced back to a United States Army Air Forces (USAAF) Air Technical Service Command specification ("Military Characteristics for All-Weather Fighting Aircraft") for a night fighter to replace the Northrop P-61 Black Widow. The preliminary specification, issued to aircraft manufacturers on 28 August 1945, required two engines and an armament of six guns, either 0.60-inch (15 mm) machine guns or 20 mm (0.79 in) autocannons. The revised specification was issued on 23 November; it did not specify jet propulsion, but the desired maximum speed of 530 miles per hour (460 kn; 850 km/h) was challenging to meet via alternative means. The aircraft was to be armed with aerial rockets stored internally and six guns split between two flexible mounts, four guns forward and two in the rear. Each mount had to be capable of 15° of movement from the aircraft's longitudinal axis; each mount's guns were to be automatically controlled by radar. For ground attack, it had to be capable of carrying 1,000-pound (454 kg) bombs and to be able to carry a minimum of eight rockets externally. Further requirements included the ability to ascend to 35,000 feet within 12 minutes and a mission radius of 600 nautical miles.

Proposals were submitted by six aircraft companies: Bell Aircraft, Consolidated-Vultee, Douglas Aircraft, Goodyear, Northrop and Curtiss-Wright. The majority of these submissions were powered by jet engines. During March 1946, the USAAF selected the Curtiss-Wright XP-87 Blackhawk, adapted from its proposed XA-43 attack aircraft and the Northrop N-24, one of four designs submitted by the company.

The N-24, designed by Jack Northrop, was a slim-bodied, swept-wing aircraft with a two-person, pressurized cockpit and conventional landing gear. To reduce drag, the two Allison J35 turbojet engines were buried in the lower fuselage, directly behind their air intakes, and they exhausted underneath the rear fuselage. The horizontal stabilizer was mounted just above the junction of the vertical stabilizer with the fuselage and had some dihedral.

=== Contract and redesign ===
On 13 June 1946, an initial $4 million contract for two aircraft, designated XP-89, along with a full-scale mock-up, was approved. However, the mock-up construction had commenced immediately after the USAAF announced that the N-24 had been selected. It was inspected on 25 September, at which point the USAAF expressed some reservations. The inspectors believed that the radar operator needed to be moved forward, closer to the pilot, with both crewmen under a single canopy, the magnesium alloy components of the wing replaced by aluminum alloy, and the fuel tankage directly above the engines moved. Other changes were made in response to the results from wind tunnel and other aerodynamic tests conducted. The swept wings proved less satisfactory at low speeds, and a thin straight wing was selected, instead. Delivery of the first prototype was scheduled for November 1947, 14 months after the inspection. The requested alterations to the design were formalized in a series of change orders issued to Northrop. Another mockup presentation took place in December 1946.

Further changes included the position of the horizontal stabilizer also proved to be unsatisfactory, as it was affected by the engine exhaust, and it would be "blanked-out" by airflow from the wing at high angles of attack. It was moved halfway up the tail, but its position flush with the leading edge of the vertical stabilizer proved to cause extra drag through turbulence and reduced the effectiveness of the elevators and rudder. Moving the horizontal stabilizer forward solved the problem. Another major change occurred when USAAF revised its specification to delete the rear gun installation on 8 October. Another mock-up inspection was held on 17 December, and the inspectors suggested only minor changes, though the fuselage fuel tanks were still above the engines. Northrop's efforts to protect the fuel tanks were considered sufficient, as the only alternative was redesigning the entire aircraft.

The XP-89 had a thin, straight, mid-mounted wing and a crew of two seated in tandem. The slim rear fuselage and the high-mounted horizontal stabilizer led to Northrop employees calling it the Scorpion—a name later formally adopted by the Air Force. The intended armament of four 20-mm M24 cannon in a small nose turret was not ready when the XP-89 was completed in 1948. Pending the availability of either turret under development, an interim six-gun fixed installation, with 200 rounds per gun, was designed for the underside of the nose. The thin wing had an aspect ratio of 5.88, a thickness-to-chord ratio of 9% and used a NACA 0009-64 section, which was selected for its low drag at high speed and stability at low speeds. A further advantage of the straight wing was that it could accommodate heavy weights at the wingtips. The wing could not fit the circular-type (rotating) spoilerons used in the P-61, so Northrop used the "decelerons" designed for the unsuccessful XP-79 prototype. These were clamshell-style split ailerons, which could be used as conventional ailerons, as dive brakes, or function as flaps as needed. All flying surfaces, the flaps, and the landing gear were hydraulically powered. The thin wing dictated tall, thin, high-pressure (200 psi (1,379 kPa; 14 kgf/cm^{2})) mainwheel tires, while the low height of the fuselage required the use of dual wheels for the nose gear.

=== Flight testing ===
On 21 May 1947, the terms of the initial contract were revised and formalized, at which point the price was increased to $5,571,111. The delivery date of the first aircraft was scheduled for 14 months (July 1948) from signing and the second two months after that. During June 1948, an engineering acceptance inspection found that numerous discrepancies were present in the first prototype, specifically related to stability and structural integrity; remedial changes were incorporated on the second prototype. On 16 August 1948, the first prototype performed its maiden flight at Muroc Army Air Field; this milestone was reached nine months later than originally scheduled. One month prior to this first flight, the USAF changed its designation for fighter aircraft from "P" to "F". The XF-89, which was fitted with 4,000 lbf (18 kN) Allison J35-A-9 turbojets, quickly proved to be fundamentally underpowered. Initial flights were performed with conventional ailerons as the decelerons were not installed until December.

Several months earlier, the Air Force conducted a competitive evaluation of the three existing all-weather interceptor prototypes, the XF-87, the XF-89, and the US Navy's XF3D. The evaluators were qualified night-fighter pilots, radar operators, and experienced maintenance non-commissioned officers. The pilots were not impressed with any of the aircraft and recommended procurement of an interim aircraft that resulted in the development of the Lockheed F-94 Starfire from the training version of the Lockheed F-80 Shooting Star. The F-89 was the fastest of the three contenders, although it was in last place in cockpit arrangement and ease of maintenance. One pilot claimed that the XF-89 was the only real fighter and compared the XF-87 to a medium bomber and the XF3D to a trainer. The full Committee on Evaluation overruled those evaluators, preferring the Northrop design, as it had the greatest potential for development. The Air Force subsequently canceled the production contract for the F-87 to free up money for the Scorpion.

During May 1949, the Air Force issued a cost-plus-fixed-fee contract, valued at roughly $48 million, which covered the modifications to the second prototype as well as the supply of the first 48 production standard aircraft, spare parts, tooling, ground-handling equipment, and a single static test frame. Two months later, the Air Force officially accepted the first prototype, roughly one year behind schedule. By November 1949, the second aircraft was virtually complete. Around this point, Air Force officials were concerned about the aircraft's poor thrust-to-weight ratio and ordered the implementation of a weight-reduction program, as well as upgrade the engines to the more powerful Allison J33-A-21 fitted with an afterburner. Other major changes included the replacement of the nose gun turret by the Hughes-designed six-gun nose, AN/ARG-33 radar, and Hughes E-1 fire-control system, permanent wingtip fuel tanks, and the ability to lower the complete engine for better maintenance access. The new nose added 3 feet (0.91 m) to the length of the aircraft. It was redesignated YF-89A to reflect its role as a pre-production testbed to evaluate equipment and changes planned for the F-89A production aircraft. The aircraft was complete by February 1950.

After repairs from a crash landing on 27 June 1949, the XF-89 was flown to March AFB to participate in the RKO movie Jet Pilot in February 1950. Shortly afterward, the aircraft crashed on 22 February, killing the observer, when flutter developed in the elevator, and the subsequent vibrations caused the entire tail to break off. Construction of the production models was suspended until the reasons for the accident were discovered. Engineering and wind tunnel tests revealed that the geometry of the rear fuselage and the engine exhaust created flutter-inducing turbulence aggravated by the exhaust's high-frequency acoustic energy. Fixes for the problem involved the addition of a "jet wake fairing" at the bottom rear of the fuselage between the engines, external ("ice tong") mass balances for the elevator, pending the design of internal mass balances, and the addition of exhaust deflectors to the fuselage to reduce the turbulence and the consequent flutter. These modifications were initially applied to the second prototype to validate their effectiveness.

== Operational history ==
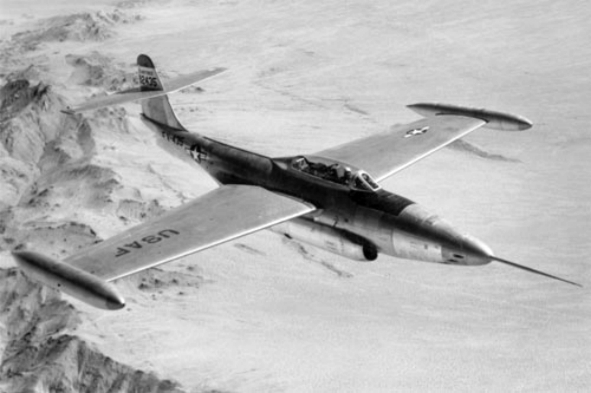
An early F-89A

On 28 September 1950, the first F-89A was accepted by the Air Force for evaluation purposes; a further two aircraft were accepted by the end of the year. Two months later, the Air Force decided to give its endorsement to the programme, albeit with stringent conditions being applied. These included the remaining flight test programme being accelerated, special tests being performed upon early production aircraft to prove the flutter issue had been resolved, and a deadline of January 1951 was set for the final resolution of this issue. As a result of increased unit costs, in part due to modifications, the number of production aircraft on order was reduced somewhat. Production aircraft were equipped with the AN/APG-33 radar and an armament of six 20-millimeter T-31 cannon with 200 rounds per gun. The swiveling nose turret was abandoned, and 300-US-gallon (250 imp gal; 1,100 L) fuel tanks were permanently fitted to the wingtips. Underwing racks could carry 16 5-inch (130 mm) aerial rockets or up to 3,200 lb (1,451 kg) of bombs.

Only 18 F-89As were completed, all of which being delivered within FY1951; they were mainly used for tests and trials, seeing little operational use. They were soon upgraded to F-89B standard, being outfitted with new avionics. During June 1951, the Scorpion entered service with the 84th Fighter-Interceptor Squadron. However, the F-89B experienced considerable problems with both the engines and other systems, resulting in its withdrawal from frontline duties during 1954. The improved F-89C had started to be introduced in September 1951, although the Air Force opted to halt allocations four months later due to issues. Despite repeated engine changes and other modifications, problems had persisted, compounded by the discovery of structural problems with the wings that led to the grounding of the F-89 and forced a refit of 194 -A, -B, and -C models. On 22 September 1952, all Scorpions, save for those involved in flight testing, were grounded until the following year. The F-89C left active service with the Air Force in 1954, it was operated by the Air National Guard as late as 1960.

The definitive production model was the F-89D. While it performed its first flight on 23 October 1951, quantity production was disrupted by the issues encountered on early models, resulting in major structural modifications, after which full production was resumed during 1953. Approximately 170 F-89Ds, the majority of which having been built prior to the resumption of production, were retrofitted to bring them up to the same standard as later-built aircraft. On 7 January 1953, the F-89D was introduced to service. It removed the cannon in favor of a new Hughes E-6 fire control system with AN/APG-40 radar and an AN/APA-84 computer. Armament was two pods of fifty-two 2.75-inch (70 mm) "Mighty Mouse" FFAR rockets. A total of 682 F-89Ds were built. In August 1956, a pair of F-89D interceptors were scrambled from Oxnard Air Force Base to shoot down a runaway F6F-5K drone leading to the so-called Battle of Palmdale, in which they fired all their rockets but failed to damage the Hellcat drone.

Proposed re-engined F-89s, designated F-89E and F-89F, were not built, nor was a proposed F-89G that would have used Hughes MA-1 fire control and GAR-1/GAR-2 Falcon air-to-air missiles like the Convair F-106 Delta Dart.

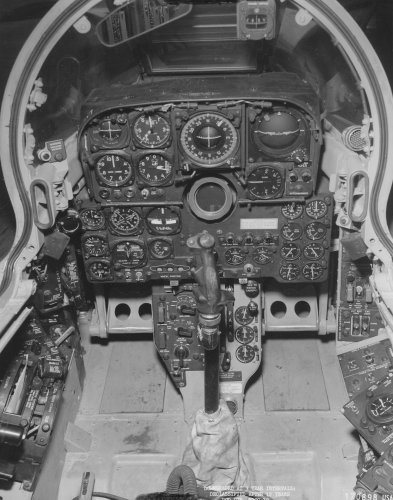
F-89 cockpit 1958

The subsequent F-89H, which entered service in 1956, had an E-9 fire control system like that of the early F-102 and massive new wingtip pods, each holding three Falcons (usually three semi-active radar homing GAR-1s and three infrared GAR-2s) and 21 FFARs, for a total of six missiles and 42 rockets. Problems with the fire-control system delayed the -H's entry into service, by which time its performance was notably inferior to newer supersonic interceptors, so it was phased out of USAF service by 1959.

The final variant was the F-89J, which was based on the F-89D, but replaced the standard wingtip missile pod/tanks with 600-US-gallon (500 imp gal; 2,300 L) fuel tanks and fitted a pylon under each wing for a single MB-1 Genie nuclear rocket (sometimes supplemented by up to four conventional Falcon air-to-air missiles). The F-89J became the only aircraft to fire a live Genie as the John Shot of Operation Plumbbob on 19 July 1957. There were no new-build F-89Js, but 350 -Ds were modified to this standard. They served with the Air Defense Command, later renamed the Aerospace Defense Command (ADC), through 1959 and with ADC-gained units of the Air National Guard through 1969. This version of the aircraft was extensively used within the Semi Automatic Ground Environment (SAGE) air-defense system.

A total of 1,050 Scorpions of all variants were produced.

== Variants ==
XF-89
First prototype, powered by two 4,000 lbf (17.79 kN) Allison J35-A-9 engines.
XF-89A
Second prototype. Fitted with more powerful 5,100 lbf (22.69 kN) dry (6,800 lbf (30.25 kN) wet) Allison J35-A-21A engines and revised, pointed nose with cannon armament.
F-89A
First production version, eight built. Fitted with a revised tailplane and six cannon armaments.
DF-89A
F-89As converted into drone control aircraft.
F-89B
Second production version with upgraded avionics. 40 built.
DF-89B
F-89Bs converted into drone control aircraft.
F-89C
Third production version with more powerful 5,600 lbf (24.91 kN) dry (7,400 lbf (32.92 kN) wet) Allison J35-A-33 engines. 164 built.
YF-89D
Conversion of one F-89B to test new avionics and armament of F-89D.
F-89D
Main production version, which saw the deletion of the six 20-millimeter cannons in favor of 104 rockets in wing pods, installation of a new Hughes E-6 fire-control system, AN/APG-40 radar, and the AN/APA-84 computer. This new system allowed a lead-collision attack in place of the previous lead-pursuit-curve technique. A total of 682 were built.
YF-89E
One-off prototype to test the 7,000 lbf (31.14 kN) dry (9,500 lbf (42.26 kN) wet) Allison YJ71-A-3 engine, converted from an F-89C. It accepted by the USAF on 27 August 1954 and was used until 1955.
F-89F
Proposed version with revised fuselage and wings, powered by 10,200 lbf (45.37 kN) dry (14,500 lbf (64.50 kN) wet) Allison J71-A-7 engines, never built.
F-89G
Proposed version equipped with Hughes MA-1 fire control and GAR-1/GAR-2 Falcon air-to-air missiles, never built.
YF-89H
Modified F-89D to test features of F-89H. Three converted.
F-89H
Version with E-9 fire control system, six Hughes GAR-1/GAR-2 Falcon missiles, and 42 Folding Fin Aircraft Rockets (FFAR). 156 built.

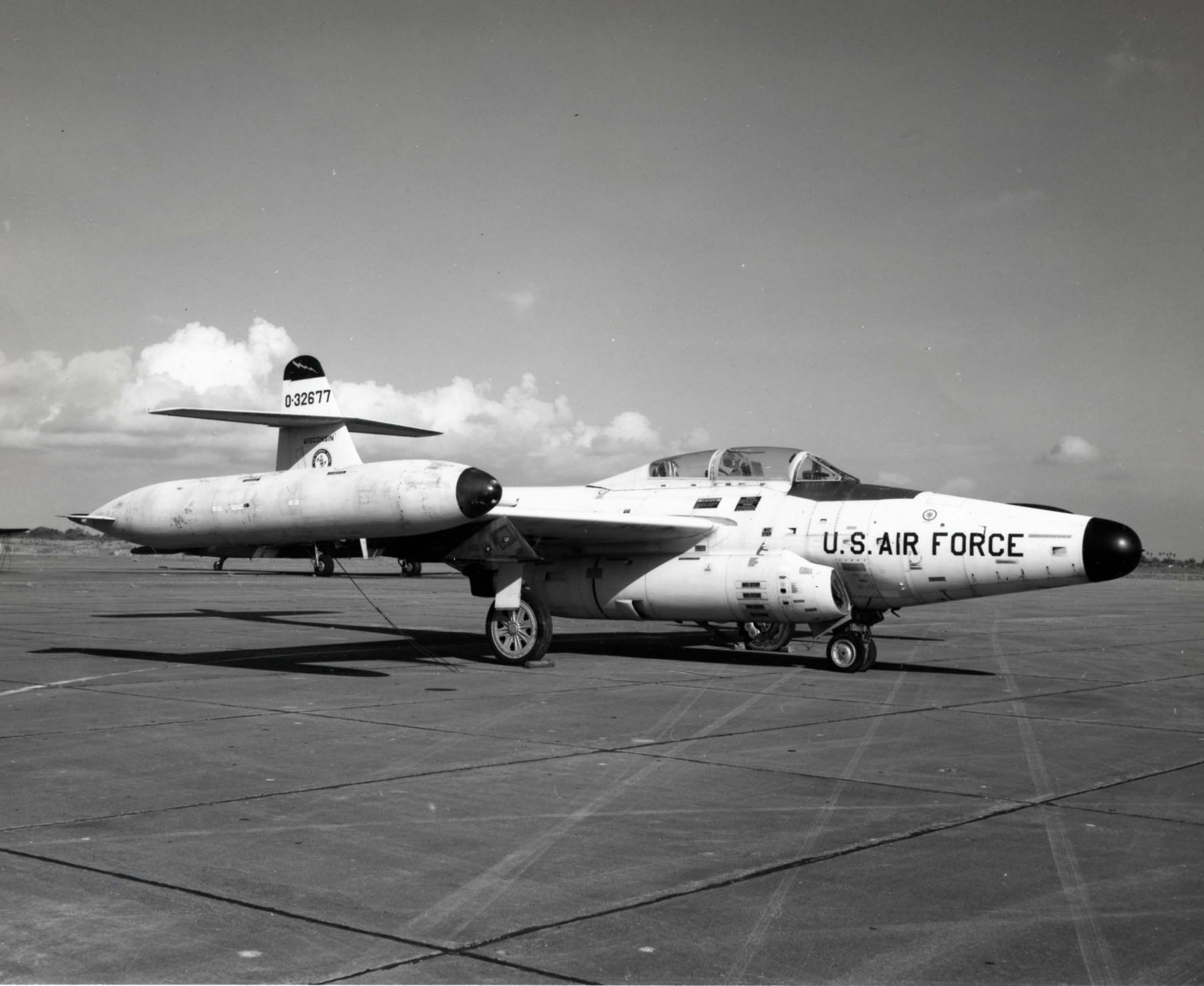
Northrop F-89J in 1972

F-89J
Conversion of F-89D with underwing hardpoints for two MB-1 (later AIR-2) Genie nuclear-armed rocket and four Falcon missiles, and carrying either the standard F-89D rocket/fuel pod or pure fuel tanks. 350 were converted from F-89Ds.

== Operators ==
see also: F-89 Scorpion units of the United States Air Force
United States

- United States Air Force
- Air National Guard

== Aircraft on display ==
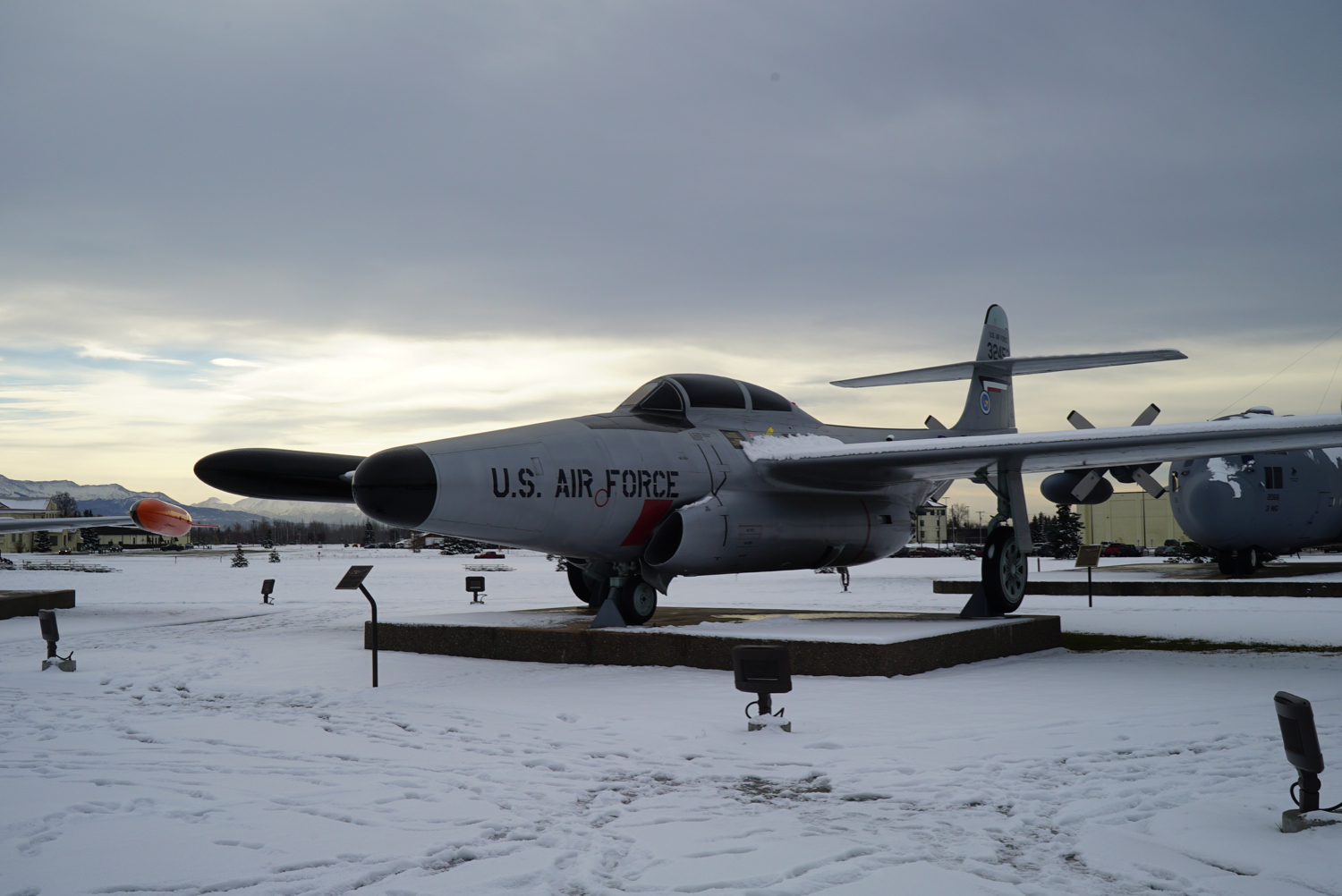
F-89D, AF Serial No. 52-1862 (marked as 53-2453), on display at Joint Base Elmendorf-Richardson

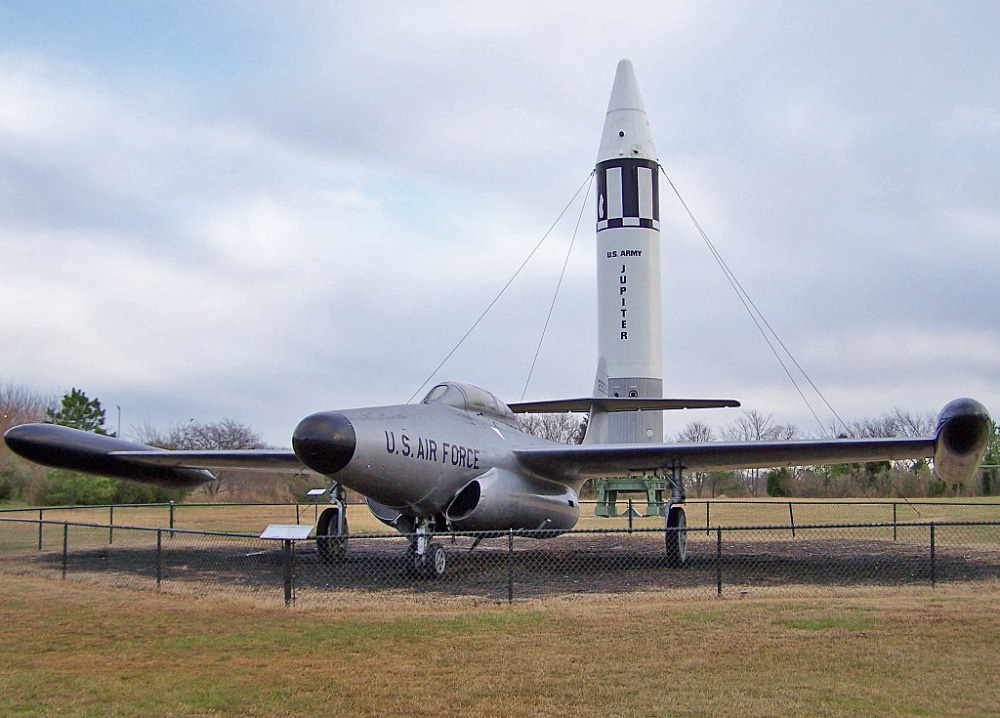
F-89J, AF Serial No. 52-2129, on display at the Air Power Park and Museum in Hampton, Virginia

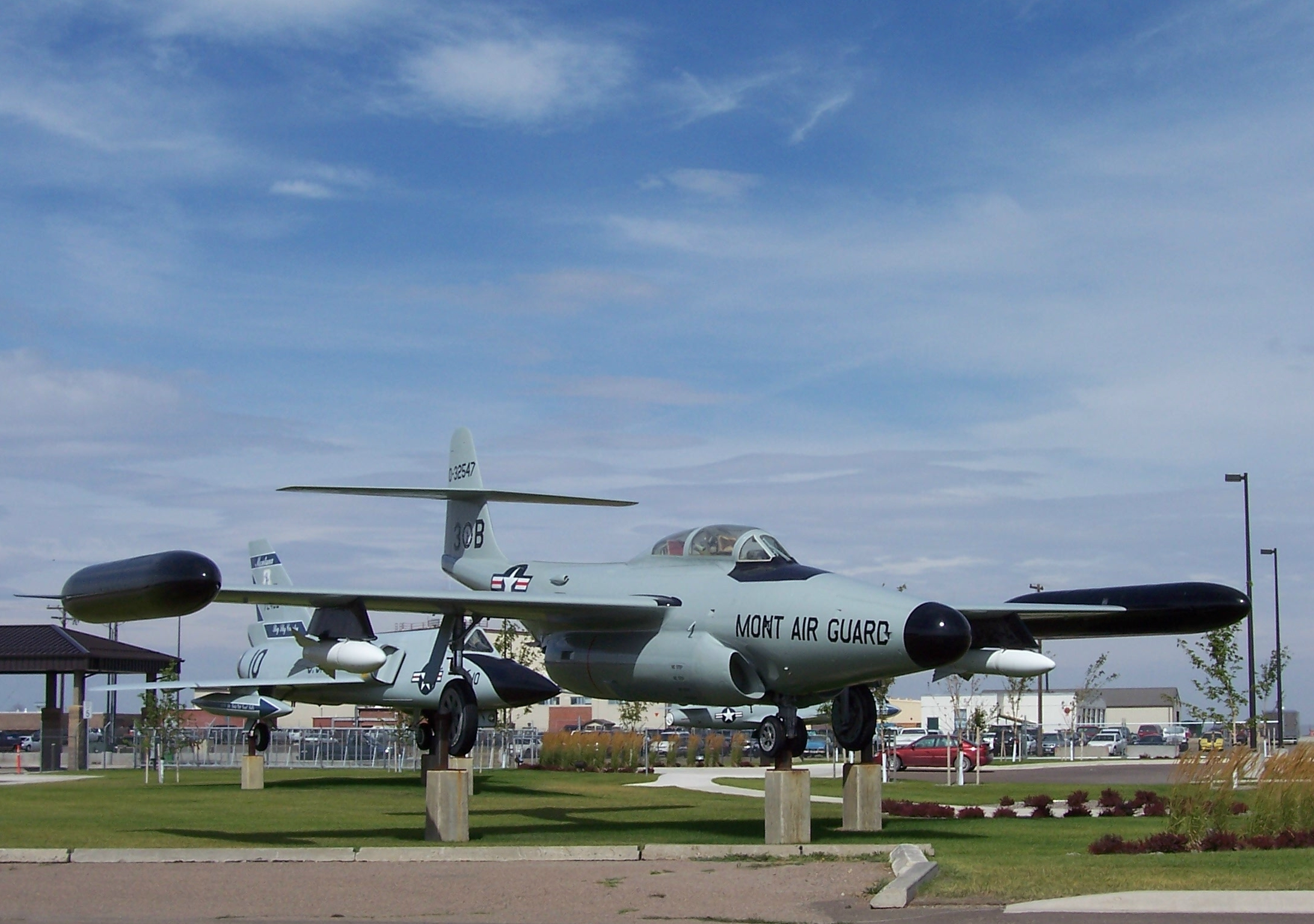
F-89J, AF Ser. No. 53-2547

F-89B

- 49-2434 - Texas Air Museum - Stinson Chapter, San Antonio, Texas.<

F-89D

- 52-1862 – Elmendorf AFB, Anchorage, Alaska. Marked as 53-2453 (actual 53-2453 is an F-89J below) Previously displayed at Tyndall AFB, Florida.
- 53-2463 – Museum of Aviation, Robins Air Force Base, Georgia.
- 53-2494 – home base of the 158th Fighter Wing, Vermont Air National Guard, Burlington Air National Guard Base, Vermont.
- 53-2517 – Planes of Fame Museum, Chino, California. The rudder of 53-2519 was added to the aircraft at the museum.
- 53-2536 – EAA AirVenture Museum, Oshkosh, Wisconsin.
- 53-2610 – Air Force Armament Museum, Eglin Air Force Base, Florida.
- 53-2646 – Friendship Park, Smithfield, Ohio.
- 53-2674 – Pima Air & Space Museum (adjacent to Davis-Monthan Air Force Base), Tucson, Arizona.
- 53-2677 – Minnesota Air National Guard Museum, Minneapolis, Minnesota.

F-89H

- 54-0298 – Dyess Linear Air Park, Dyess Air Force Base, Texas.
- 54-0322 – Hill Aerospace Museum, Hill Air Force Base, Utah.

F-89J

- 52-1856 – Bangor International Airport / Bangor Air National Guard Base (former Dow AFB), Maine.
- 52-1868 – Selfridge Military Air Museum, Selfridge ANGB, Michigan.
- 52-1896 – New England Air Museum, Windsor Locks, Connecticut.
- 52-1911 (painted as 53-2509) – National Museum of the United States Air Force, Wright-Patterson Air Force Base, Dayton, Ohio. This aircraft was the last F-89 remaining in service when it was transferred to the Museum from the Maine Air National Guard in July 1969.
- 52-1927 – Castle Air Museum (former Castle AFB), Atwater, California.
- 52-1941 – Peterson Air and Space Museum, Peterson Air Force Base, Colorado.
- 52-1949 – March Field Air Museum, March Air Reserve Base (former March AFB), Riverside, California.
- 52-2129 – Air Power Park and Museum (near Langley Air Force Base), Hampton, Virginia.
- 53-2547 – 120th Fighter Wing of the Montana Air National Guard at Great Falls Air National Guard Base, Great Falls International Airport, Montana. It is the only F-89 to have ever fired a Genie rocket with a live nuclear warhead, having done so as part of Operation Plumbob.
- 53-2453 – Heritage Flight Museum, Burlington, Washington. (note: see 52-1862 above, marked as 53-2453)
- 53-2604 – 119th Wing of the North Dakota Air National Guard, Fargo Air National Guard Base / Hector Field, Fargo, North Dakota.

== Specifications (F-89D) ==
3-view line drawing of the Northrop F-89 Scorpion

Data from Scorpion with a Nuclear Sting

General characteristics

- Crew: 2
- Length: 53 ft 9.5 in (16.396 m)
- Wingspan: 59 ft 8.5 in (18.199 m)
- Height: 17 ft 6 in (5.33 m)
- Wing area: 606 sq ft (56.3 m^{2})
- Aspect ratio: 5.88
- Airfoil: NACA 0009-64
- Empty weight: 25,194 lb (11,428 kg)
- Gross weight: 37,190 lb (16,869 kg)
- Max takeoff weight: 42,241 lb (19,160 kg)
- Powerplant: 2 × Allison J35-A-35 afterburning turbojet engines, 5,440 lbf (24.2 kN) thrust each dry, 7,200 lbf (32 kN) with afterburner

Performance

- Maximum speed: 645 mph (1,038 km/h, 560 kn) at 10,600 ft (3,200 m)
- Ferry range: 1,366 mi (2,198 km, 1,187 nmi)
- Service ceiling: 49,200 ft (15,000 m)
- Rate of climb: 7,440 ft/min (38 m/s)

Armament

- 2 × pods of 52 2.75 in (70 mm) "Mighty Mouse" Mk 4/Mk 40 Folding-Fin Aerial Rockets, for a total of 104.

Avionics

- Hughes E-6 fire-control system
- AN/APG-40 radar
- AN/APA-84 computer

== See also ==
Aircraft of comparable role, configuration, and era

- Avro Canada CF-100
- Curtiss-Wright XF-87 Blackhawk
- Gloster Javelin
- Lockheed F-94 Starfire
- North American F-86D Sabre
- Sud Aviation Vautour
- Yakovlev Yak-25

Related lists

- Lists of military aircraft of the United States
- List of fighter aircraft
