= Nevada State Route 42 =

Nevada State Route 42 may refer to:

- Nevada State Route 42 (1935)
- Nevada State Route 42 (1940s), which existed until the 1970s renumbering
