= Curtiss-Wright XF-87 Blackhawk =

Prototype all-weather interceptor

XF-87 Blackhawk
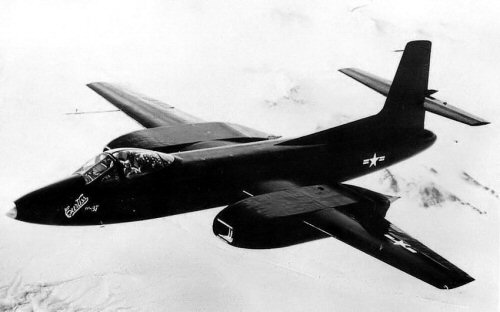
- XF-87 fighter prototype

General information
- Type: Interceptor aircraft
- National origin: United States
- Manufacturer: Curtiss-Wright
- Status: Canceled 10 October 1948
- Primary user: U.S. Air Force
- Number built: 2

History
- First flight: 5 March 1948

The Curtiss-Wright XF-87 Blackhawk (previously designated the XP-87) was a prototype American all-weather jet fighter-interceptor, and the company's last aircraft project. Designed as a replacement for the World War II–era propeller-driven P-61 Black Widow night/interceptor aircraft, the XF-87 lost in government procurement competition to the Northrop F-89 Scorpion. The loss of the contract was fatal to the company; the Curtiss-Wright Corporation closed down its aviation division, selling its assets to North American Aviation.

== Design and development ==
The aircraft started life as a project for an attack aircraft, designated XA-43. When the United States Army Air Forces issued a requirement for a jet-powered all-weather fighter in 1945, the design was reworked for that request.

The XP-87 was a large mid-wing aircraft with four engines paired in underwing pods, with a mid-mounted tailplane and tricycle undercarriage. Two crew members (pilot and radar operator) sat side by side under a single canopy. Armament was to be a nose-mounted, powered turret containing four 20 mm (0.79 in) cannon, but this was never fitted to the prototypes. Instead the aircraft was armed with four fixed forward firing 20mm cannon.

== Operational history ==
The first flight of the XF-87 Blackhawk was on 5 March 1948. Although the top speed was slower than expected, the aircraft was otherwise acceptable, and the newly formed (in September 1947) United States Air Force placed orders for 57 F-87A fighters and 30 RF-87A reconnaissance aircraft just over a month later. Since the performance problems were due to lack of power, the four Westinghouse XJ34-WE-7 turbojets of the prototypes were to be substituted for two General Electric J47 jets in production models. One of the two XF-87 prototypes was to be modified as a test bed for the new engines.

At this point, the USAF decided that the Northrop F-89 Scorpion was a more promising aircraft. The F-87 contract was canceled on 10 October 1948, and both prototypes were scrapped.

== Variants ==
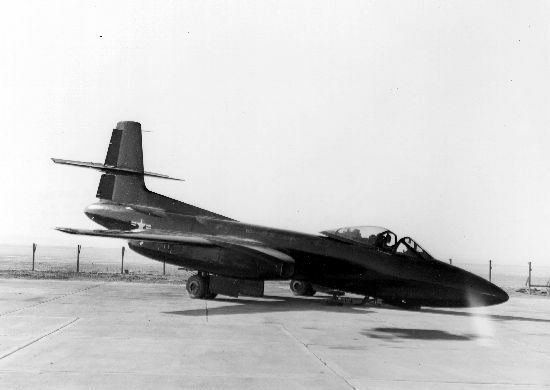
XP-87 following nosewheel collapse

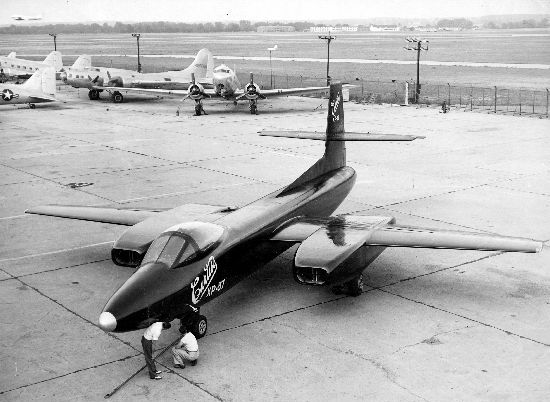
XP-87 on ramp with C-47s and B-17s in background

XP-87
First flight was March 5, 1948

XF-87
Redesignated XP-87

F-87A
Production fighter version (canceled)

RF-87A
Reconnaissance variant (canceled)

== Specifications (XF-87 No.1) ==
Data from Curtiss Aircraft 1907–1947

General characteristics

- Crew: 2
- Length: 62 ft 10 in (19.15 m)
- Wingspan: 60 ft 0 in (18.29 m)
- Height: 20 ft 0 in (6.10 m)
- Wing area: 600 sq ft (56 m^{2})
- Empty weight: 25,930 lb (11,762 kg)
- Gross weight: 49,900 lb (22,634 kg)
- Powerplant: 4 × Westinghouse XJ34-WE-7 turbojet engines, 3,000 lbf (13 kN) thrust each

Performance

- Maximum speed: 600 mph (970 km/h, 520 kn) at sea level
- Range: 1,000 mi (1,600 km, 870 nmi)
- Service ceiling: 41,000 ft (12,000 m)
- Time to altitude: 35,000 ft (11,000 m) in 13 minutes 48 seconds

Armament

- Guns: 4 × 20 mm (0.787 in) AN/M2 cannon in the nose

== See also ==
Aircraft of comparable role, configuration, and era

- Avro Canada CF-100 Canuck
- Lockheed F-94 Starfire
- Northrop F-89 Scorpion
- Yakovlev Yak-25

Related lists

- List of attack aircraft
- List of fighter aircraft
- List of military aircraft of the United States
