= A42 road (Northern Ireland) =

Road in Northern Ireland

Coordinates: 54.92186°N 6.09419°W

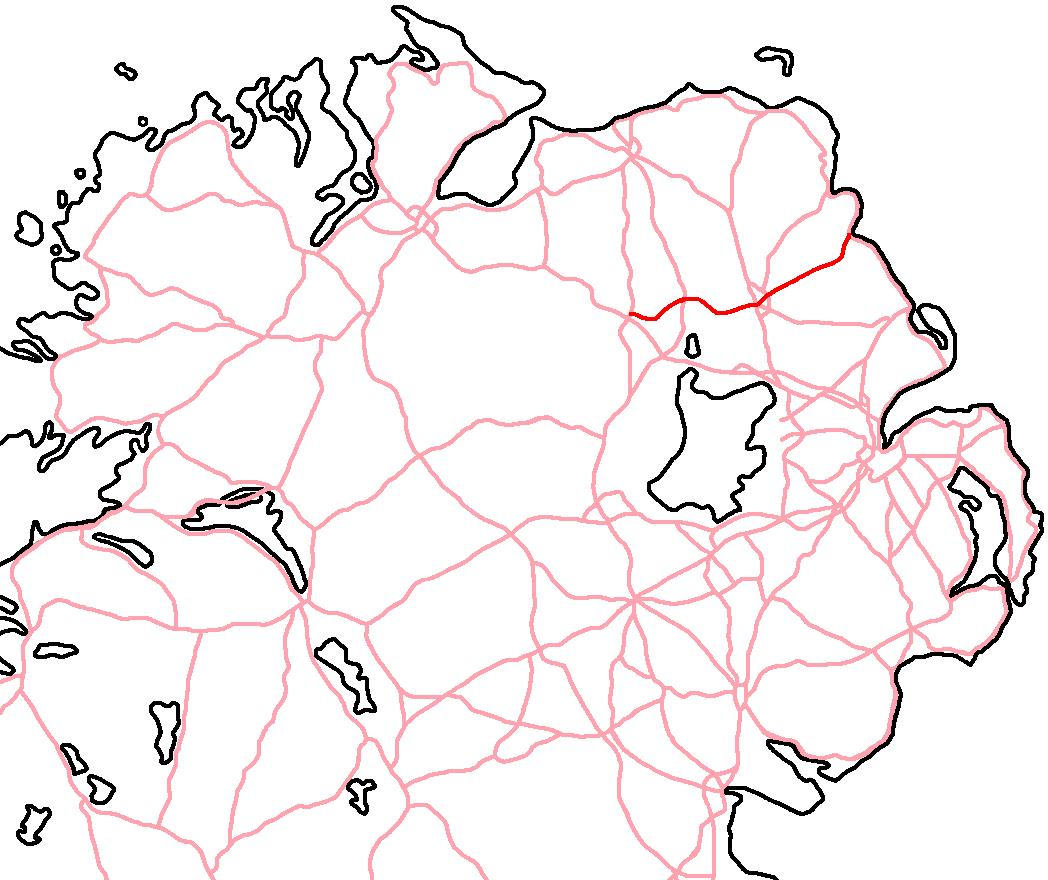
The route of the A42 in red from Carnlough (Co. Antrim) to Maghera (County Londonderry)

The A42 is an east–west route in Northern Ireland. It starts in Maghera in County Londonderry, from where it goes in the direction of Carnlough on the shores of the North Channel of the Irish Sea, at the foot of the Glens of Antrim. The road goes through Gulladuff and Clady (both in County Londonderry), as well as Portglenone, Ahoghill, Ballymena Broughshane and The Sheddings (all in County Antrim).

The route forms part of the inner ring road of Ballymena and cross the River Bann (the county boundary between Antrim and Londonderry) between Clady and Portglenone. Between The Sheddings and Carnlough the roads climbs down Glencloy.
