= 305th Air Division =

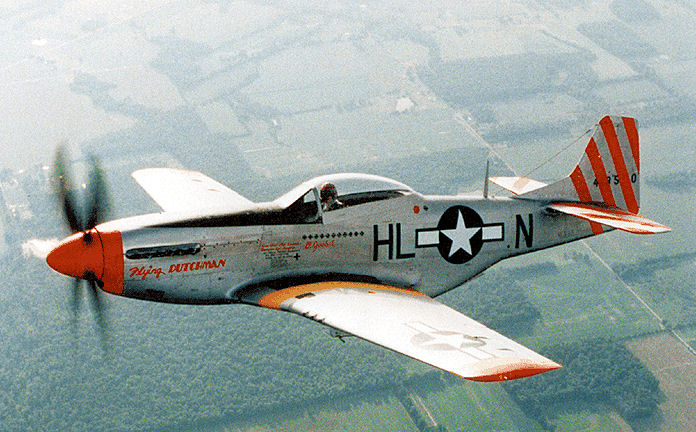
- P-51 Mustang of the 31st Fighter Group
- Active: 1943–1945; 1947–1949
- Country: United States
- Branch: United States Air Force
- Role: Command of bombardment units
- Motto: Aquilia Non Capit Muscas (Latin for 'The Eagle Does Not Hunt Flies')
- Engagements: Mediterranean Theater of Operations

Commanders
- Lt Col Earl J. Nesbitt: 2 January 1944
- Lt Col Julian M. Bleyer: 14 January 1944 – April 1944
- Col William R. Morgan: 13 June – 9 September 1945 (Note: Commanders during the years as a reserve unit are unknown. AFHRA Factsheet, 305 Air Division.)

Insignia
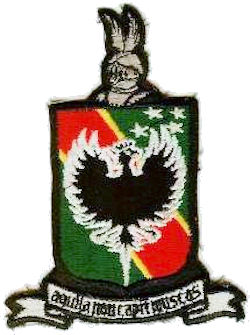
- Patch with Unofficial 305th Bombardment Wing emblem

The 305th Air Division is an inactive United States Air Force organization. Its last assignment was with Continental Air Command, assigned to Fourth Air Force at McChord Air Force Base, Washington, where it was inactivated on 27 June 1949.

The division was first activated in December 1943 as the 305th Bombardment Wing, although it was used to man other organizations and had no combat units assigned until a month after VE Day when it absorbed the assets of a provisional fighter wing, and the units of another fighter wing, but no bombardment units. When the surrender of Japan occurred, the unit no longer anticipated a transfer to the Pacific and was inactivated in September 1945. It was activated in the reserves in 1947.

== History ==
=== World War II ===
The division was first activated at Foggia, Italy in late December 1943 as the 305th Bombardment Wing, but does not appear to have been manned until early January. (Note: No commanding officer was assigned until 2 January. AFHRA Factsheet,305th Air Division.) The wing had no combat components assigned until after VE Day in May 1945, and the wing commanding officer was a lieutenant colonel. Instead, its personnel was used to man Fifteenth Air Force headquarters, and a provisional fighter wing which was formed in the fall of 1944.

==== 305th Fighter Wing (Provisional) ====
Unlike most combat air forces during World War II, Fifteenth Air Force was not assigned a fighter command. Instead, all its fighter groups were assigned to its bombardment wings until February 1944, when they were transferred to the 306th Bombardment Wing, which became the 306th Fighter Wing in May. (Note: Despite the healthy number of fighter groups assigned in the spring of 1944, the groups were short of fighter aircraft and most of those on hand, including the early model Mustangs, were too short ranged to perform adequate escort duty. Simpson, Vol. III, p. 570.) On 3 September 1944, Fifteenth formed XV Fighter Command (Provisional) and attached the 306th Wing to it. At the same time, it also organized the 305th Fighter Wing (Provisional) at Salsola Airfield and attached the three groups of the 306th Wing that were flying Lockheed P-38 Lightnings (the 1st, 14th and 82d Fighter Groups) to the provisional wing. The 306th Wing retained control of the groups flying the Mustang. (Note: Fifteenth fighter units had been flying earlier, shorter-ranged models of the Mustang, but Eighth Air Force was given priority for the delivery of new Mustangs. Simpson, Vol. III, p. 570.)

The wing initially focused on strategic missions, such as escorting bombers. After March 1945, the wing moved to Lesina Airfield and its groups focused on interdiction missions against German forces in Italy, Southern Germany, Austria and Yugoslavia.

On 12 June 1945, the provisional wing moved from Lesina to Torremaggiore Airfield, where the 305th Bombardment Wing was already located. It was disbanded upon arrival and its personnel assigned to the bombardment wing.

==== Assignment of fighter groups ====
In addition to absorbing the personnel and headquarters of the provisional wing, the Mustang groups of the 306th Fighter Wing were also assigned to the 305th in June 1945, and the wing instituted an extensive training program in anticipation that its groups would be transferred to the Pacific to participate in the war against Japan. The 305th emphasized instrument flying and navigation; and formation, high altitude, and transition flying. One of the wing's P-51 groups also conducted experimental work in dive bombing. Pilots practiced in the Link Trainer and attended classes in engineering, air discipline, intelligence, personal equipment, air sea rescue, chemical warfare and communications procedures. However, with the surrender of Japan in August the wing began to transfer its groups to the United States at the end of August and was inactivated in Italy in September.

=== Air Force reserve ===
The wing was reactivated as a reserve unit under Air Defense Command (ADC) on 12 July 1947 at McChord Field, Washington. It was assigned the 445th and 456th Bombardment Groups. which were activated the same day at McChord In October, the 454th Bombardment Group was activated at McChord and assigned to the wing. The three groups were all designated as very heavy units, and nominally were Boeing B-29 Superfortress units. However, there is no indication that the groups were equipped with tactical aircraft. Regular Air Force support for reserve training at McChord was provided by the 2345th Air Force Reserve Training Center.

In 1948, Continental Air Command assumed responsibility from ADC for managing Air National Guard and reserve units. When the regular Air Force implemented the wing base organization system, which placed operational and support units on a base under a single wing that same year, the 305th Wing, along with other reserve wings with more than one combat group assigned, was redesignated as an air division.

The 305th participated in routine reserve training and supervised the training of its three assigned groups until all were inactivated, in part due to President Truman’s 1949 defense budget, which required reductions in the number of units in the Air Force, Most of their equipment and personnel were used to form the 302d Troop Carrier Wing, which was simultaneously activated at McChord.

== Lineage ==
- Established as the 305th Bombardment Wing (Heavy) on 7 December 1943

Activated on 29 December 1943
Redesignated 305th Bombardment Wing, Heavy c. 4 May 1945
Inactivated on 9 September 1945

- Redesignated 305th Bombardment Wing, Very Heavy on 13 May 1947

Activated in the Reserve on 12 July 1947
Redesignated 305th Air Division, Bombardment on 16 April 1948
Inactivated on 27 June 1949

=== Assignments ===
- Fifteenth Air Force, 29 December 1943 – 9 September 1945
- Fourth Air Force, 12 July 1947 – 27 June 1949

=== Stations ===
- Foggia, Italy, 29 December 1943
- Spinazzola Airfield, Italy, 19 January 1944
- Bari, Italy, 6 March 1944
- Torremaggiore Airfield, Italy, c. December 1944 – 9 September 1945
- McChord Field (later McChord Air Force Base), Washington, 12 July 1947 – 29 June 1949

=== Components ===
Fighter Groups (1945)

- 1st Fighter Group: c. 13 June – c. 9 September 1945

Lesina Airfield, Italy

- 14th Fighter Group: c. 13 June – 9 September 1945

Triolo Airfield, Italy to September 1945, Lesina Airfield, Italy

- 31st Fighter Group: c. 13 June – 9 September 1945

Mondolfo Airfield, Italy to 15 July 1945, Triolo Airfield, Italy to August 1945

- 52d Fighter Group: 13 June – c. 30 August 1945

Piagiolino Airfield, Italy to 8 July 1945, Lesina Airfield, Italy to 10 August 1945

- 82d Fighter Group: 3 – 9 September 1945

Vincenzo Airfield, Italy to x. 30 August 1945, Lesina Airfield, Italy

- 325th Fighter Group: 13 June – c. 30 August 1945

Mondolfo Airfield, Italy to July 1945, Vincenzo Airfield, Italy

- 332d Fighter Group: 13 June – c. 9 September 1945

Cattolica Airfield, Italy to c. 18 July 1945, Lucera Airfield, Italy (Note: The 31st and 52d Groups left for United States while still assigned to the wing. The remaining groups were reassigned or inactivated when the wing was inactivated.)

Bombardment Groups (1947–1948)

- 445th Bombardment Group: 12 July 1947 – 27 June 1949
- 454th Bombardment Group: 17 October 1947 – 27 June 1949
- 456th Bombardment Group: 12 July 1947 – 27 June 1949

=== Aircraft ===
- Lockheed P-38 Lightning, 1945
- North American P-51 Mustang, 1945

=== Campaigns ===
Campaign Streamer	Campaign	Dates	Notes
	Naples-Foggia	29 December 1943 – 21 January 1944	305th Bombardment Wing
	Rome-Arno	22 January 1944 – 9 September 1944	305th Bombardment Wing

== See also ==
- List of United States Air Force air divisions
- List of Lockheed P-38 Lightning operators
