= 301st Air Refueling Wing =

Inactive US Air Force unit

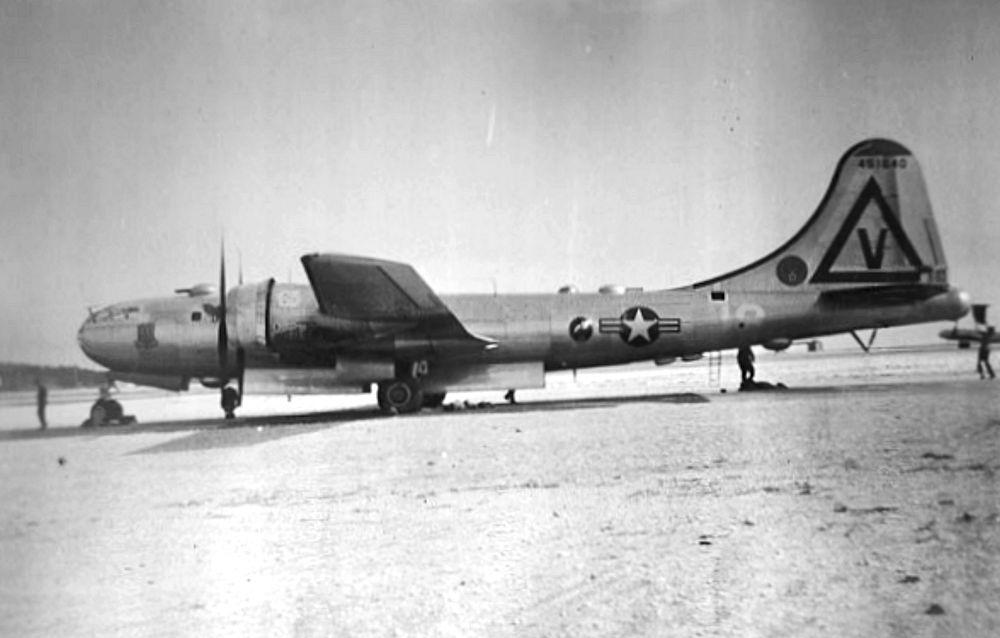
- 301st Bombardment Wing B-29A Superfortress (Note: Aircraft is Boeing B-29A Superfortress, serial 44-61640. Taken at Smoky Hill AFB, Kansas, 1948. Note Triangle-V SAC Tail Code, Eighth Air Force)
- Active: 1947–1979; 1988–1992
- Country: United States
- Branch: United States Air Force
- Role: Bombardment, aerial refueling
- Motto: Who Fears?

Insignia
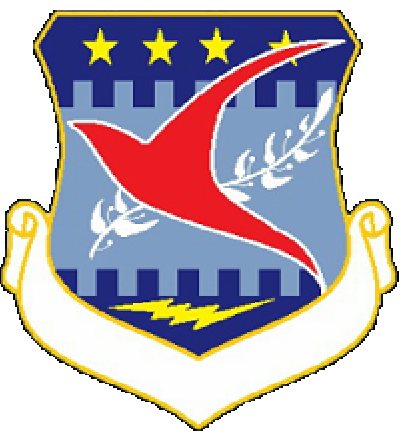
- 301st Air Refueling Wing emblem (Note: Approved 22 July 1959.)

The 301st Air Refueling Wing is an inactive unit of the United States Air Force being last assigned to the Strategic Air Command at Malmstrom Air Force Base, Montana, where it was inactivated on 1 June 1992.

== History ==
Activated 5 November 1947. Assigned to Strategic Air Command. Equipped with B-29 Superfortresses. Conducted strategic bombardment training, 1947–1948, and aerial gunnery training for other SAC organizations, November 1947 – January 1948.

Moved to Barksdale Air Force Base, Louisiana in 1949, the 301st was one of the first units to conduct air refueling operations with the KB-29 tanker version of the Superfortress. Replaced the propeller-driven B-29s with new Boeing B-47E Stratojet swept-wing medium bombers in 1953, capable of flying at high subsonic speeds and primarily designed for penetrating the airspace of the Soviet Union. Also upgraded its KB-29 tankers to the dedicated Boeing KC-97 Stratofreighter. The mission of the 301st was to train for strategic bombing missions and to conduct aerial refueling. The wing deployed to England in 1953 and to French Morocco in 1954.

It moved to Lockbourne Air Force Base, Ohio on 15 April 1958 where it became an electronic countermeasures (ECM) unit and was engaged in various clandestine intelligence missions. Although equipped with the B-47E Stratojet, the 301st added electronic countermeasure activities to other missions in 1958 with the addition of the RB-47E and later EB-47E. With these aircraft, the wing soon devoted most of its activity to ECM work. The RB-47 carried out many ferret missions around the periphery of Soviet territory, and sometimes inside. In the early 1960s, the B-47 was considered to be reaching obsolescence, and was being phased out of SAC's strategic arsenal. Began sending its stratojets to Davis-Monthan Air Force Base in late 1963, the last EB-47E going to storage in 1964.

Became an air refueling wing in April 1964, discontinuing all previous missions. In addition, participated in the post attack command and control system from 3 March 1965 to 30 June 1966.

From around 9 June to 8 October 1972, most of the wing headquarters staff, all tactical aircraft and crews, and most of the maintenance personnel, plus support personnel in various categories, deployed in Southeast Asia (U-Tapao Royal Thai Navy Airfield), attached to other SAC organizations. A reduced wing headquarters remained in the United States to administer activities of the combat support group and hospital at Lockbourne.

From 19 December 1972 to 18 January 1973, the wing repeated previous deployed condition on a smaller scale, with deployed resources forming a provisional air refueling squadron at Clark Air Base in the Philippines.

The 301st was inactivated on 30 November 1979 in conjunction with SAC turning over Rickenbacker to the Air National Guard. Its KC-135As were sent to various Air National Guard units.

The Wing was reactivated on 8 January 1988 at Malmstrom Air Force Base, Montana, and assigned to 4th Air Division, Strategic Air Command. It was equipped with KC-135s. It was inactivated on 1 June 1992.

=== Lineage ===
- Established as the 301st Bombardment Wing, Very Heavy on 15 October 1947

Organized on 5 November 1947
Discontinued on 1 August 1948.
Redesignated: 301st Bombardment Wing, Medium and activated on 1 August 1948
Redesignated 301st Air Refueling Wing, Heavy on 15 June 1964
Inactivated on 30 November 1979
Activated on 8 January 1988
Redesignated 301st Air Refueling Wing on 1 September 1991
Inactivated on: 1 June 1992

=== Assignments ===
- Fifteenth Air Force, 5 November 1947 – 1 August 1948; 1 August 1948
- Second Air Force, 1 April 1950
- 4th Air Division, 10 February 1951

Attached to: 7th Air Division, 3 December 1952–c. 4 March 1953
Attached to: 5th Air Division, c. 10 February–c. 17 April 1954

- 801st Air Division, 15 April 1958
- 817th Air Division, 15 March 1965
- 57th Air Division, 15 November 1965
- 40th Air Division, 2 July 1966
- 42d Air Division, 31 March 1970
- 40th Air Division, 1 July 1973
- 42d Air Division, 1 July 1975 – 30 November 1979
- Fifteenth Air Force, 8 January 1988
- 40th Air Division, 7 July 1989
- Fifteenth Air Force, 1 September 1991 – 1 June 1992

=== Stations ===
- Smoky Hill Army Air Field (later Smoky Hill Air Force Base), Kansas, 5 November 1947 – 1 August 1948; 1 August 1948
- Barksdale Air Force Base, Louisiana, 7 November 1949
- Lockbourne Air Force Base (later Rickenbacker Air Force Base), Ohio, 15 April 1958 – 30 November 1979
- Malmstrom Air Force Base, Montana, 8 January 1988 – 1 June 1992

=== Components ===
Wings

- 22d Bombardment Wing: attached 1 August 1948 – 9 May 1949 (not operational)
- 97th Bombardment Wing: attached 17 March–16 May 1948

Groups

- 22d Bombardment Group: attached 18 May–1 August 1948; attached 1 August–15 November 1948; attached February–9 May 1949
- 301st Operations Group (later 301st Operations Group): 5 November 1947 – 1 August 1948 (detached July 1948); 1 August 1948 – 16 June 1952 (detached 1 August 1948 – January 1949, 15 May–30 November 1950; not operational, 10 February 1951 – 16 June 1952), 1 September 1991 – 1 June 1992

Squadrons

- 32d Bombardment (later Air Refueling) Squadron: attached 10 February 1951 – 15 June 1952, assigned 16 June 1952 – 8 June 1964; assigned 15 March 1965 (not operational, c. 9 June–8 October 1972)
- 91st Air Refueling Squadron: attached 4 May–14 June 1964, assigned 15 June 1964 – 1 July 1971
- 301st Air Refueling Squadron: assigned to 301st Bomb Wing March 1949, TDY Lakenheath UK May–December 1950, attached 10 February 1951 – 15 June 1952, assigned 16 June 1952 – 15 April 1958 (detached 20–26 June 1955, 10 July–18 September 1955, 27 April–27 June 1956, 15 November–6 December 1956, 27 December 1956 – 28 February 1957); assigned 30 September 1973 – 31 December 1975
- 321st Air Refueling Squadron: 15 April 1958 – 15 March 1965 (detached 11 April–13 July 1960, 3 October 1961 – January 1962)
- 352d Bombardment Squadron: attached 10 February–20 September 1951; attached 20 December 1951 – 15 June 1952, assigned 16 June 1952 – 8 June 1964
- 353d Bombardment Squadron: attached 10 February 1951 – 15 June 1952, assigned 16 June 1952 – 8 June 1964
- 376th Air Refueling Squadron: attached 1 December 1957 – 15 April 1958
- 419th Bombardment Squadron: 1 December 1958 – 1 January 1962
- 4363d Post Attack Command and Control: attached 15–25 March 1965.

=== Aircraft flown ===
- B-29 Superfortress, 1947–1953
- Boeing KB-29, 1949–1953
- B-47 Stratojet, 1953–1961, 1963–1964, RB-47 1958, EB-47 1961–1965
- KC-97 Stratofreighter, 1953–1961, 1962–1963
- Boeing EC-135,1964–1966
- KC-135 Stratotanker, 1963–1979

== See also ==
- List of B-29 Superfortress operators
- List of B-47 units of the United States Air Force
