= Fifteenth Air Force =

US Air Force formation

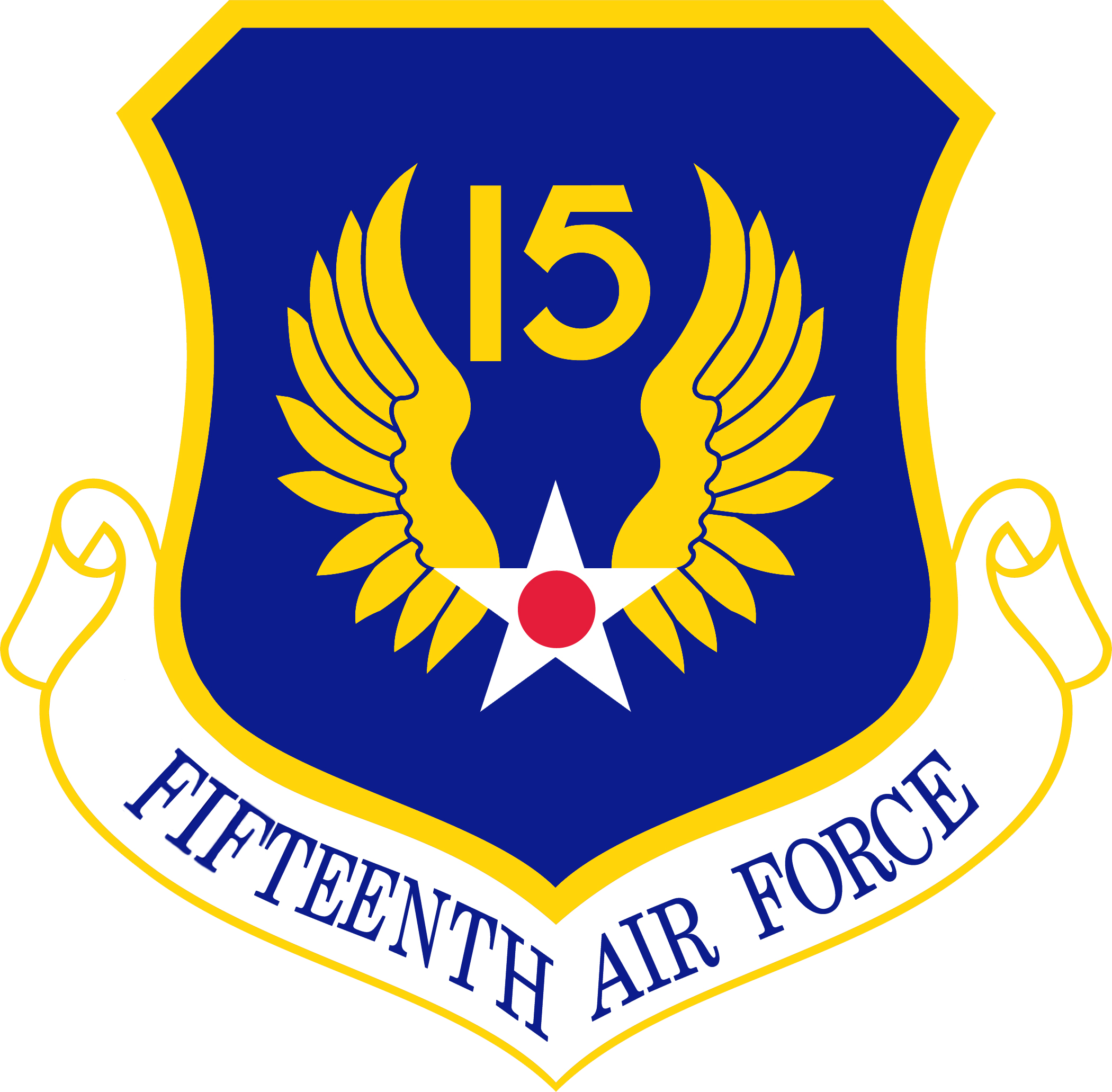
- Active: 1 November 1943 – 15 September 1945; 31 March 1946 – 20 March 2012; 20 August 2020 – present
- Country: United States
- Branch: United States Air Force
- Type: Numbered Air Force
- Part of: Air Combat Command
- Garrison/HQ: Shaw Air Force Base, South Carolina
- Engagements: World War II – EAME Theater

- Decorations: Air Force Outstanding Unit Award (10x)
- Website: www.15af.acc.af.mil

Commanders
- Commander: Maj Gen Steven Behmer
- Deputy Commander: Col William Creeden
- Senior Enlisted Leader: CMSgt Jeremy L. Unterseher

The Fifteenth Air Force (15 AF) is a numbered air force of the United States Air Force's Air Combat Command (ACC). It is headquartered at Shaw Air Force Base. It was reactivated on 20 August 2020, merging the previous units of the Ninth Air Force and Twelfth Air Force into a new numbered air force responsible for generating and presenting Air Combat Command's conventional forces.

Established on 1 November 1943, Fifteenth AF was a United States Army Air Forces combat air force deployed to the European Theater of World War II, bombing Europe from bases in southern Italy and engaging in air-to-air fighter combat against enemy aircraft.

During the Cold War, 15 AF was one of three Numbered Air Forces of the United States Air Force Strategic Air Command (SAC), commanding USAF strategic bombers and missiles on a global scale. Elements of 15th Air Force engaged in combat operations during the Korean War, the Vietnam War, and Operation Desert Storm.

15 AF was redesignated Fifteenth Expeditionary Mobility Task Force (15 EMTF) on 1 October 2003. 15 EMTF provided support for strategic airlift for all United States Department of Defense agencies as well as air refueling for the Air Force in both peace and wartime for the Pacific region. 15 EMTF inactivated on 20 March 2012.

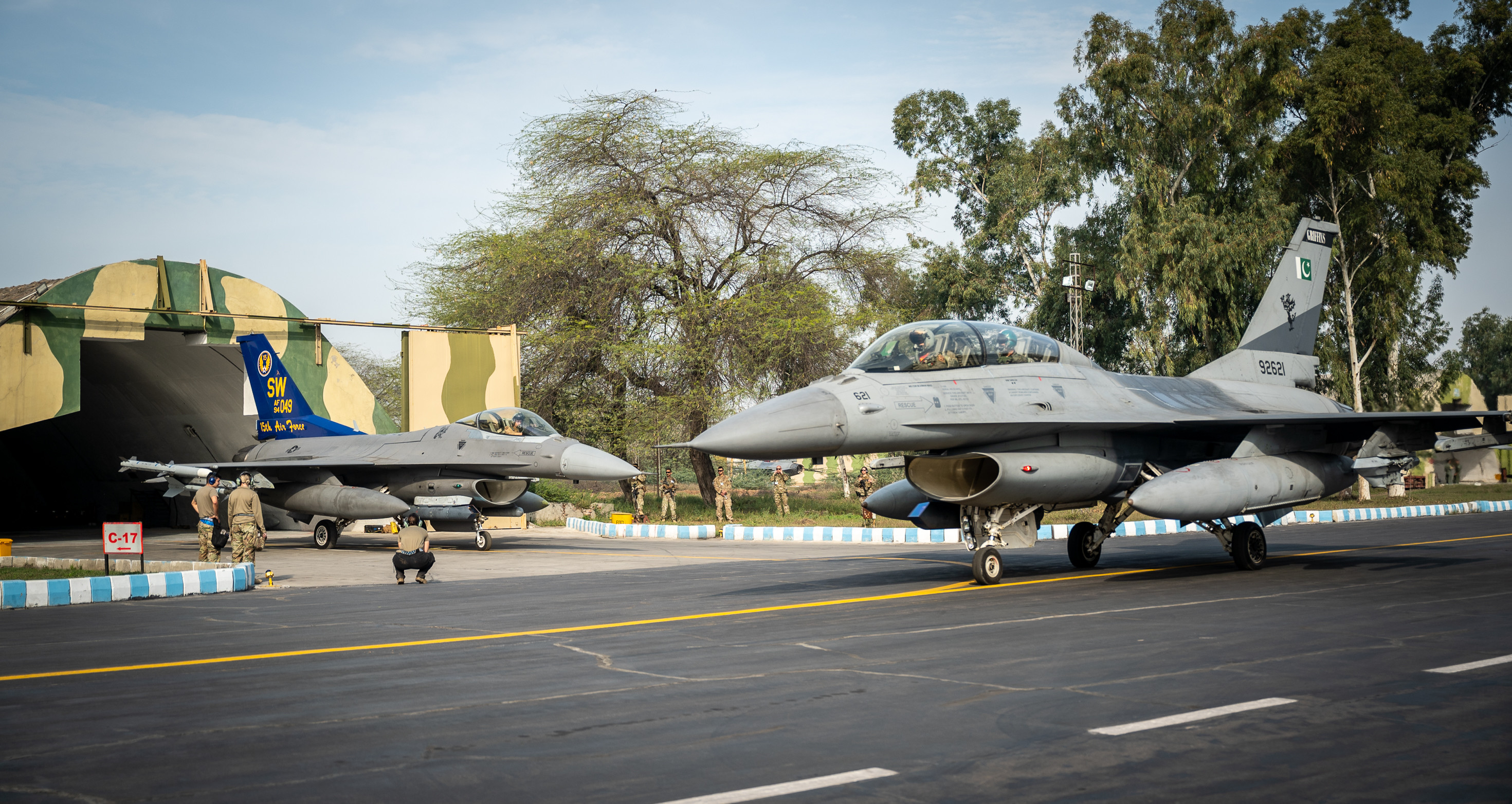
US F-16 from the 15th AF exits its hangar while a Pakistani F-16B from No. 9 Squadron PAF taxis to the runway during Exercise Falcon Talon 2022

On 20 August 2020, 15 AF was reactivated as an Air Combat Command numbered air force, taking over the previous conventional flying forces of both the Ninth and Twelfth Air Forces.

== Second World War ==
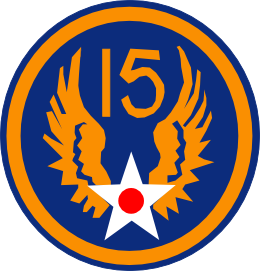
15th USAAF patch

The Fifteenth Air Force (15th AF) was established on 1 November 1943 in Tunis, Tunisia as part of the United States Army Air Forces in the Mediterranean Theater of Operations as a strategic air force. It commenced combat operations the day after it was formed. The first commander was General Jimmy Doolittle.

15th AF resulted from a reorganization of American air forces in the Mediterranean in late 1943. Lewis H. Brereton's Ninth Air Force (9th AF) was moved to England, taking over the medium bomber units of Eighth Air Force, while Twelfth Air Force gave its strategic units to 15th AF, becoming the Americans' Mediterranean tactical air force. The new air force was activated with a strength of ninety Consolidated B-24 Liberators and 210 Boeing B-17 Flying Fortresses, inherited from the Twelfth Air Force and Ninth Air Force. In December, new groups, most of which were equipped with B-24s soon started arriving from the United States. Thirteen new groups were added.

It was hoped that the 15th AF – stationed in the Mediterranean – would be able to operate when the Eighth Air Force (8th AF) in England was socked in by bad English weather. The 9th AF would later move to England to serve as a tactical unit to take part in the invasion of Europe. Once bases around Foggia in Italy became available, the 15th was able to reach targets in southern France, Germany, Poland, Czechoslovakia, and the Balkans, some of which were difficult to reach from England.

=== Operational Units ===
- 5th Bombardment Wing (B-17 Flying Fortress) "Y" Tail Code

Transferred from: Twelfth Air Force
Headquartered: Foggia, Italy, 13 December 1943 – 2 November 1945

2d Bombardment Group "Circle-Y"
97th Bombardment Group "Triangle-Y"
99th Bombardment Group "Diamond-Y"
301st Bombardment Group "Square-Y" (green)
463d Bombardment Group "Wedge-Y" (yellow)

483d Bombardment Group "Y-Star" (red)

Transferred from MacDill Field, Florida, 2 March 1944

Attached: 68th Tactical Reconnaissance Group:

November 1943 – April 1944

Airfields: Amendola Airfield (2d BW), Celone Airfield (463d BW), Cerignola Airfield (97th BW), Foggia (2d BW, 463d BW), Lucera Airfield (301st BW), Manduria, (68th RG), Maricianise (97th BW), Sterparone (483d BW), Tortorella (99th BW, 483d BW)

- 47th Bombardment Wing (B-24 Liberator) "The Pyramidiers" "Triangle" Tail Code

Transferred from Ninth Air Force
Headquartered: Manduria, Italy, 11 November 1943 – May 1945

98th Bombardment Group Triangle (Yellow/Black Tail Stripe)
376th Bombardment Group "Triangle Circle 2"

449th Bombardment Group "Triangle Circle 3"
450th Bombardment Group ("Cotton Tails" 1943–45) "Triangle Circle 5"

Airfields: Brindisi (98th BG), Grottaglie (449th BG), Lecce (98th BG), Manduria (98th BG), San Pancrazio (376th BG, 450th BG)

- 49th Bombardment Wing (B-24 Liberator) "Red Tail"

Transferred from Greenville AAB, South Carolina 6 April 1944
Headquartered: Bari Airfield, Italy, 6 April 1944 – 16 October 1945

451st Bombardment Group "Red Tail Red Dot"
461st Bombardment Group "Red Tail Red Dash"

484th Bombardment Group "Red Tail Red Bow"

Airfields: Gioia del Colle (451st BG), San Pancrazio (451st BG), Torretta (484th BG)

- 55th Bombardment Wing (B-24 Liberator) "Yellow/Black Tail"

Transferred from: MacDill Field, Florida
Headquartered: Taranto, Italy, March 1944 – July 1945

460th Bombardment Group "Yellow/Black Tail Square Dot"
464th Bombardment Group "Yellow/Black Tail Square l"

465th Bombardment Group "Yellow/Black Tail"
485th Bombardment Group "Yellow/Black Tail Square X"

Airfields: Gioia (464th BG), Pantanella (465th BG), Spinazzola Airfield (460th BG), Venosa Airfield (485th BG)

- 304th Bombardment Wing (B-24 Liberator) "Black Diamond"

Activated in Italy
Headquartered: Cerignola Airfield, Italy, 29 December 1943 – September 1945

454th Bombardment Group "Black Diamond"
455th Bombardment Group "Black Diamond Yellow Tail"
456th Bombardment Group "Black Diamond Red Tail"

459th Bombardment Group
"Black Diamond Yellow/Black Check Tail"

Airfields: Giulia Airfield (455th BG), San Giovanni Airfield (454th BG, 455th BG, 456th BG)

- 305th Fighter Wing (Provisional) (Lockheed P-38 Lightning)

Transferred from Twelfth Air Force, 1943
Headquartered:

Foggia, 29 December 1943 – 19 January 1944
Spinazzola Airfield, 19 January – 6 March 1944

Bari Airfield, 6 March – December 1944
Torremaggiore, December 1944 – 9 September 1945

1st Fighter Group

27FS (HV Red), 71st (LM Black), 94th (UN Yellow)

14th Fighter Group

82d Fighter Group

Airfields: Gioia del Colle Airfield (1st FG), Lesina (14th FG 82d FG), Salosa (1st FG), Triolo Airfield (14th FG), Vincenzo Airfield (82d FG)

- 306th Fighter Wing (Republic P-47 Thunderbolt)(North American P-51 Mustang)

Activated in Italy
Headquartered:

Bari Airfield, Italy, 15–27 January 1944
Foggia, Italy, 27 January – 23 February 1944
Lucera, Italy, 23 February – 8 March 1944

Torremaggiore, Italy, 8 March – 3 September 1944
Lesina Airfield, Italy, 3 September 1944 – 5 March 1945
Fano, Italy, 5 March – 15 July 1945

31st Fighter Group

Red diagonal tail stripes after conversion from Spitfires
307FS (MX), 308FS (HL), 309FS (WZ)

52d Fighter Group

Yellow Tails assigned 1 August 1944
2FS (QP) 4FS (WD), 5FS (VF)

325th Fighter Group

Black / Yellow checkerboard Tails
317FS (10–39), 318FS (40–69), 319FS (70–99)

332d Fighter Group

Red Tails assigned 1 August 1944
99FS (A00 – A39, Blue), 100FS (1–39, Black), 301FS (40–69, White), 302FS (70–99,01-09, Yellow)

Airfields: Capodichino (332nd FG), Cattolica (332d FG), Madna Airfield (52nd FG), Mondolfo (31st FG. 325th FG), Montecorvino (332nd FG), Piagiolino (52nd FG), Ramitelli (332nd FG), Rimini (325th FG), Vincenzo Airfield (325th FG)

.* Sent to Aghione, Corsica from 10 to 21 August 1944 for Operation Dragoon (Invasion of Southern France)

- 15th Special Group (Provisional)

Reported directly to Fifteenth Air Force
Assigned to 15th Air Force in June 1944

Stationed at Brindisi
Re-designated 2641st Special Group (Provisional)
859th BS flew Carpetbagger operations out of England until September 1944 before being moved to MTO
885th BS was initially known as 122nd BS assigned to 68th Reconnaissance Group operating B-17s in the MTO. Assigned to the 15th Special Group in January 1945.

- 305th Bombardment Wing

Activated in Italy, 29 December 1943, No units assigned until 13 June 1945
Headquarters: Torremaggiore, December 1944 – September 1945

1st Fighter Group
14th Fighter Group
31st Fighter Group
52nd Fighter Group

82nd Fighter Group
325th Fighter Group
332d Fighter Group

=== Initial Operations ===
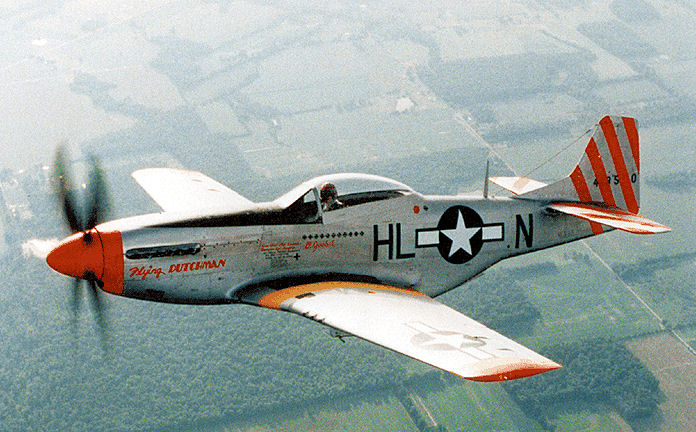
Restored P-51D of the 31st Fighter Group, 308th Fighter Squadron, "Flying Dutchman", showing 12 aerial victories.

The 15th Air Force began its operations on 1 November 1943, attacking the Rimini Marshalling yard with 28 B-25's assigned to the 321st BG (M). On 1 December 1943, the Headquarters was moved to Bari Airfield, Italy.

On 4 January 1944, the Fifteenth, along with Twelfth Air Force, were organized into Mediterranean Allied Air Forces, along with No. 205 Group Royal Air Force. MAAF was the southern component of U.S. Strategic Air Forces, Europe, the overall USAAF command and control organization in Europe.

The first major operation carried out by Fifteenth Air Force was bombing missions in support of the Anzio Landings in Italy, Operation Shingle beginning on 22 January 1944. Strikes on German and fascist Italian targets were carried out and caused widespread damage to Axis forces.

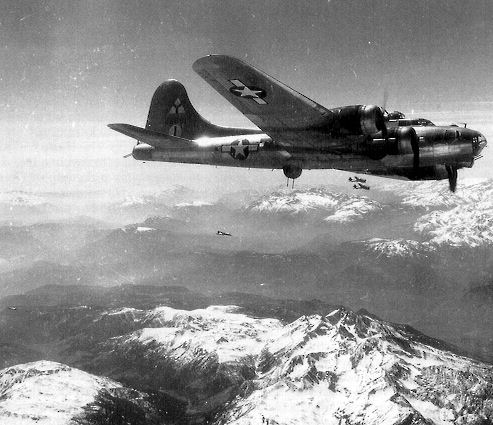
B-17F of the 97th Bomb Group over the Alps

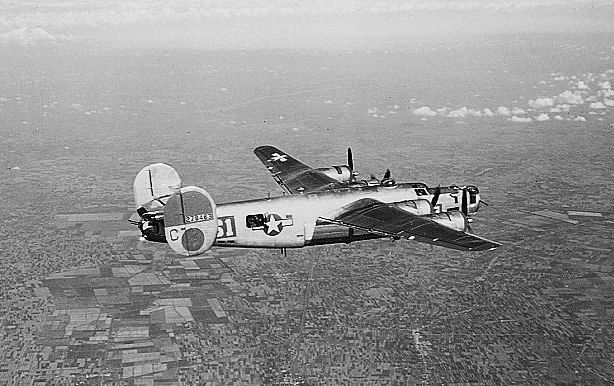
B-24 of the 451st Bomb Group

=== Big Week ===
"Big Week" was the name of an intense Eighth and Fifteenth Air Forces series of attacks on Germany in a series of co-ordinated raids on the German aircraft industry. The plan, code-named "Operation Argument," was to use both American strategic air forces in Europe, with support by the Royal Air Force with night bombing raids to destroy or seriously cripple the German ability to produce combat aircraft.

The Americans were facing strong Luftwaffe fighter opposition to their daylight bombing raids over Nazi-occupied Europe, and it was planned to initiate Operation Argument at the earliest possible date.

On 22 February 1944, Fifteenth Air Force made its first attack on Germany, with an attack on Regensburg. The Fifteenth dispatched a force of 183 bombers to the Oberstraubing Messerschmidt assembly plant. Some 118 bombed with good results but fourteen were shot down. The next day the 15th sent 102 bombers to the Steyr ball-bearing works in Austria where they destroyed twenty percent of the plant. On 24 February, over 180 Liberators inflicted considerable damage to the Messerschmitt Bf 110 assembly plant at Gotha, losing 28 aircraft in the process. On 25 February 114 B-17s and B-24s were dispatched to Steyr again, but the force became separated and the Liberators bombed the Fiume oil refinery instead. Seventeen bombers were lost.

Despite these losses, it was believed that the USSTAF had dealt the German aircraft industry a severe blow.

=== Oil industry targets ===
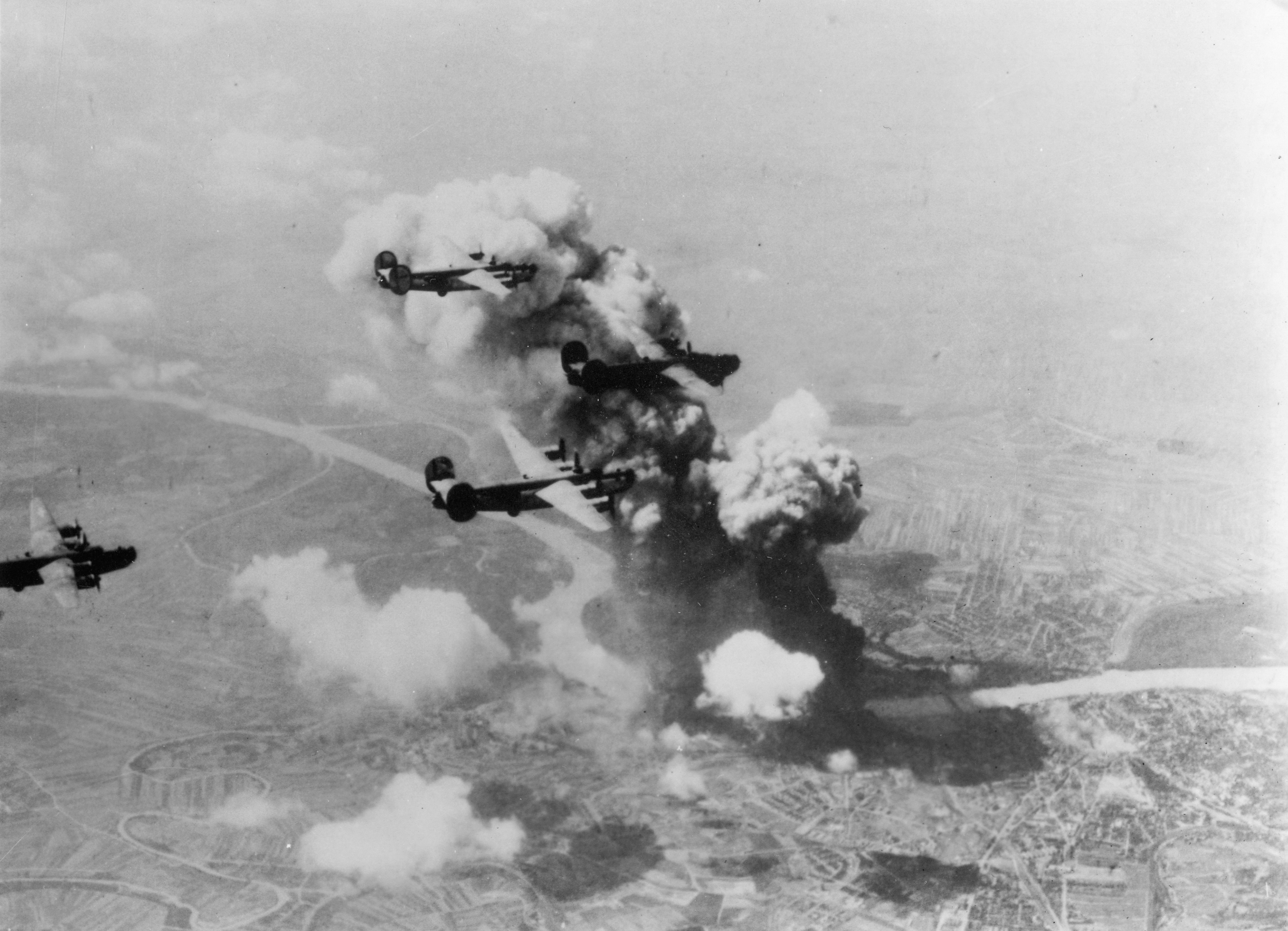
15th Air Force B-24s attacking the Apollo oil refinery in Bratislava, Slovakia, 16 June 1944

In April, General Eisenhower ordered the USSTAF to attack German fuel production centers by striking both the oil refineries and the factories producing synthetic fuels. The 15th started the offensive on 5 April when it dispatched 235 B-17s and B-24s from Italy to transportation targets in the vicinity of the Ploiești oilfields in Romania. The refineries were attacked again on 15 and 24 April, inflicting additional damage.

Attacks on oil targets had assumed top priority by October and vast fleets of heavy bombers, escorted by P-38 Lightning and P-51 Mustang fighters, attacked refineries in Germany, Reichsgau Sudetenland, Slovakia and Romania. The P-51 escorts were able to establish an environment of air superiority, enabling the bombers to roam widely across southern and eastern Europe, attacking targets at Brüx in Reichsgau Sudetenland, Bratislava in Slovakia, Budapest, Komárom, Győr, and Pétfürdő in Hungary, Belgrade and other cities in Yugoslavia, and Trieste in north-eastern Italy.

=== Soviet support ===
By June 1944, the 15th Air Force was bombing railway networks in southeast Europe in support of Soviet military operations in Romania. Throughout the summer of 1944, Austrian aircraft manufacturing centers at Wiener Neustadt were bombed and oil producing centers were attacked. On 2 June, the 15th Air Force flew its first "shuttle" mission when 130 B-17s and P-51 escorts landed in Russian controlled territory after a raid in Hungary. Two more shuttle missions followed.

=== Operation Anvil ===
In August, the 15th began attacking targets in Southern France in preparation for Operation Anvil, the invasion of Southern France. Marseilles, Lyon, Grenoble, and Toulon were all attacked by B-24s and B-17s.

=== Operation Reunion ===
After the 1944 Romanian coup d'état, the 15th Air Force bombed the German-occupied airports of Băneasa and Otopeni. Between 31 August and 3 September 1944, aircraft from the 15th AF carried out Operation Reunion by airlifting the released Allied prisoners from Romania.

=== The end of the Third Reich ===
I could see omens of the war’s end almost every day in the blue southern sky when, flying provocatively low, the bombers of the American Fifteenth Air Force crossed the Alps from their Italian bases to attack German Industrial targets.

— Albert Speer, Hitler's Minister for Armaments, Inside the Third Reich, Memoirs of Albert Speer

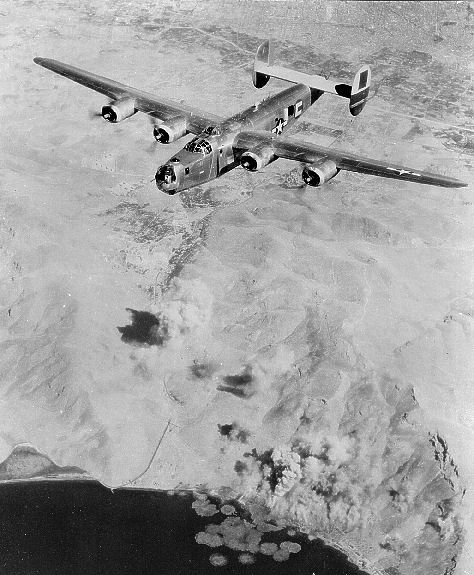
B-24 of the 464th Bomb Group

The only 15th AF mission to Berlin was on 24 March 1945 when 666 bombers struck the capital, Munich, and other German targets, as well as Czechoslovakia. The Berlin force was attacked by Me 262 jets that inflicted losses (one bombers and five fighters) while the Mustangs claimed eight jets downed – actual Luftwaffe records show only three Me 262's lost in this engagement. The 47th BW and 55th BW attacked Fliegerhorst Neuburg damaging or destroying 54 Me 262A-1's from III./KG (J) 54, 304th BW attacked Fliegerhorst Münich-Riem destroying 13 Me 262's. The NASM's Me 262 shows a claim credit for a B-17 shot down this date.

The last major effort came on 25 April when 467 bombers struck rail targets in Austria, severing communications into Czechoslovakia. The 15th's final bombing mission was flown 1 May when 27 B-17s escorted by 51 P38's of the 14th FG attacked Salzburg rail targets.

With the German surrender in Italy, 15th Air Force aircraft began dropping supplies over Yugoslavia and evacuating Allied prisoners of war. It performing its last mission on 16 May 1945.

A total of around 2,110 bombers were lost on operations by its 15 B-24 and six B-17 bombardment groups, while its seven fighter groups claimed a total of 1,836 enemy aircraft destroyed. The Fifteenth was inactivated in Italy 15 September 1945.

== Postwar era in late 1940s ==
On 31 March 1946, Fifteenth Air Force was reactivated at Colorado Springs AAB, Colorado and assigned to the ten-day-old Strategic Air Command. 15th AF assumed the assets and personnel of the former Continental Air Forces Second Air Force, which was inactivated on 30 March.

The original bomb groups assigned to 15th Air Force were:

- 28th Bombardment Group

Activated at Grand Island AAF, Nebraska on 4 August 1946
Transferred to Eleventh Air Force, Elmendorf AAF, Alaska,
20 October 1946
Reassigned to 15th AF at Rapid City AAF, South Dakota
3 May 1947
Established as 28th Bombardment Wing (Very Heavy),
28 July 1947*

- 92d Bombardment Group

Activated at Ft Worth AAF, Texas, 4 August 1946
Reassigned to Smoky Hill AAF, Kansas, October 1946
Reassigned to Spokane AAF, Washington, June 1947
Established as 92d Bombardment Wing (Very Heavy),
17 November 1947*

- 93d Bombardment Group

Activated at Castle Field, California, 21 June 1946
Established as 93d Bombardment Wing (Very Heavy),
28 July 1947*

- 97th Bombardment Group

Activated at Smoky Hill AAF, Kansas, 4 August 1946
Established as 97th Bombardment Wing (Very Heavy),
11 September 1947*
Reassigned to Eighth Air Force, 16 May 1948

- 301st Bombardment Group

Activated at Clovis AAF, New Mexico on 4 August 1946
Inactivated 16 July 1947
Reactivated at Smoky Hill AAF, Kansas, 16 July 1947
Established as 301st Bombardment Wing (Very Heavy),
15 October 1947*
Reassigned to Barksdale AFB, Louisiana, 7 November 1949

- 307th Bombardment Group

Activated at MacDill AAF, Florida on 4 August 1946
Established as 307th Bombardment Wing (Very Heavy),
28 July 1947*

- 311th Reconnaissance Wing

Reassigned to MacDill AAF, Florida on 17 April 1946
Transferred to Fifteenth Air Force on 1 May 1946
Redesignated as 311th Air Division (Reconnaissance) on 6 April 1948

.*Group became subordinate element to wing.

However, demobilization was in full swing and few of these groups were fully equipped or manned. All of these groups were equipped with B-29 Superfortresses, most or all of which were aircraft which returned from Twentieth Air Force groups returning from the Pacific War. When SAC was established in 1946, its primary bomber aircraft was the B-29. Although there were many in storage, they were war-weary. The plane was greatly improved and soon new models, designated the B-50 Superfortress, began joining the inventory replacing the older aircraft.

15th Air Force org chart, 1947

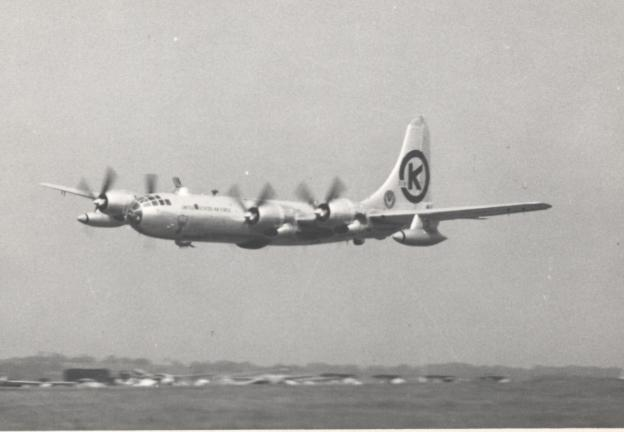
Boeing B-50D of Fifteenth Air Force displaying while on detachment to England in May 1953

The 15 AF returned to a combat-ready role as a result of the 1948 Berlin Crisis, a squadron from the 301st Bombardment Group was deployed with its B-29s at Fürstenfeldbruck Air Base, Germany. SAC immediately ordered the group's other two squadrons to Goose Bay Air Base, Labrador to prepare for immediate deployment to Germany. The 307th and 28th Bombardment Groups were placed on alert and ordered to be ready to deploy within three and twelve hours respectively. Within a few weeks, the other 301st Bomb Group's squadrons had joined the first. Later on 28 July, Bombardment Group left Rapid City AFB, South Dakota for RAF Scampton, in the United Kingdom. The 307th Bombardment Group left MacDill AFB, Florida for RAF Marham and RAF Waddington in the UK.

The 56th Fighter Wing at Selfridge in Michigan left Fifteenth Air Force on 1 December 1948, transferring to Tenth Air Force.

On 7 November 1949, Headquarters Fifteenth Air Force was relocated to March AFB, California. As part of this realignment, most SAC bomber forces west of the Mississippi River were reassigned to 15th AF. Those east of the Mississippi were assigned to SAC's other strategic air force, Eighth Air Force, and reassigned to Westover AFB, Massachusetts, where it commanded all SAC bases in the eastern United States.

From 1947 onwards Fifteenth Air Force incorporated a number of fighter escort wings and strategic fighter wings, intended to escort bombers to their targets. Among these units were the 56th Fighter Wing, 71st Strategic Fighter Wing, the 82nd Fighter Wing, and the 407th Strategic Fighter Wing. They were all redesignated and transferred to other USAF components in 1957–58 with the end of the fighter escort concept.

== Korean War ==
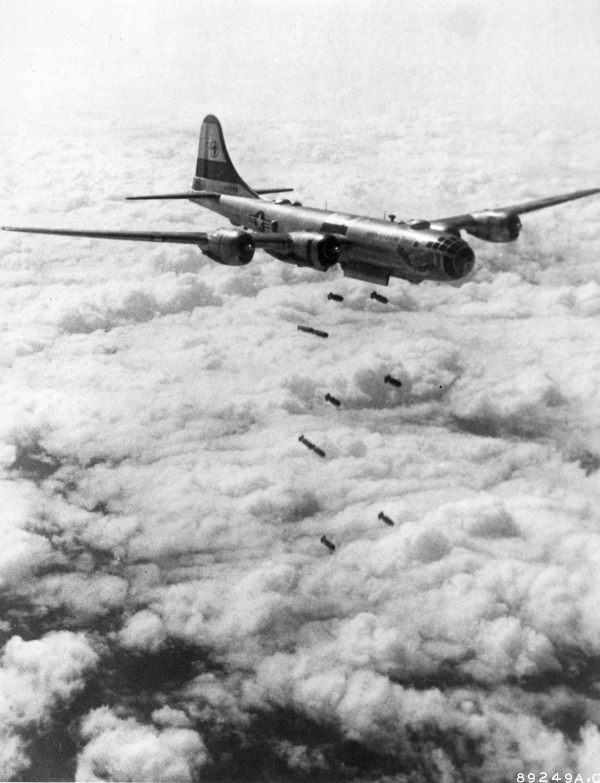
Over the course of the war, at least 16 B-29 bombers were shot down by communist aircraft.

On 25 June 1950, the armed forces of the Democratic People's Republic of Korea (North Korea) invaded South Korea. On 27 June the United Nations Security Council voted to assist the South Koreans in resisting the invasion. President Harry S. Truman authorized General Douglas MacArthur (commander of the US occupying forces in Japan) to commit units to the battle. MacArthur ordered General George E. Stratemeyer, CIC of the Far Eastern Air Force (FEAF) to attack attacking North Korean forces between the front lines and the 38th parallel.

At that time, the 22 B-29s of the Twentieth Air Force 19th Bomb Group stationed at Andersen Field on Guam were the only aircraft capable of hitting the Korean Peninsula, and this unit was ordered to move to Kadena Air Base on Okinawa and begin attacks on North Korea. These raids began on 28 June. On 29 June, clearance was given for B-29 attacks on airfields in North Korea.

On 8 July, a special FEAF Bomber Command was set up under the command of Major General Emmett O'Donnell. Although President Truman wasn't willing to risk extensive use of the U.S. bomber force in the United States, which was being used as a deterrent for possible Soviet aggression in Europe, a few groups of B-29 bombers – that were not part of the nuclear strike force – were released. On 13 July, the FEAF Bomber Command took over command of the Twentieth Air Force 19th Bombardment Group and of the Fifteenth Air Force's 22nd and 92nd Bombardment Groups which had been transferred from SAC bases in the United States. Later in July, the Fifteenth Air Force 98th and 307th Bombardment Groups were sent to Japan to join the FEAF. The 92nd and 98th BGs and the 31st SRG operated from bases in Japan, whereas the 19th, 22nd, and 307th BGs were based in Okinawa.

When the Korean War ended on 27 July 1953, the B-29s had flown over 21,000 sorties, nearly 167,000 tons of bombs had been dropped, and 34 B-29s had been lost in combat (16 to fighters, four to flak, and fourteen to other causes). B-29 gunners had accounted for 34 Communist fighters (16 of these being MiG-15s) probably destroyed another 17 (all MiG-15s) and damaged 11 (all MiG-15s). Losses were less than one per 1000 sorties.

== Cold War ==
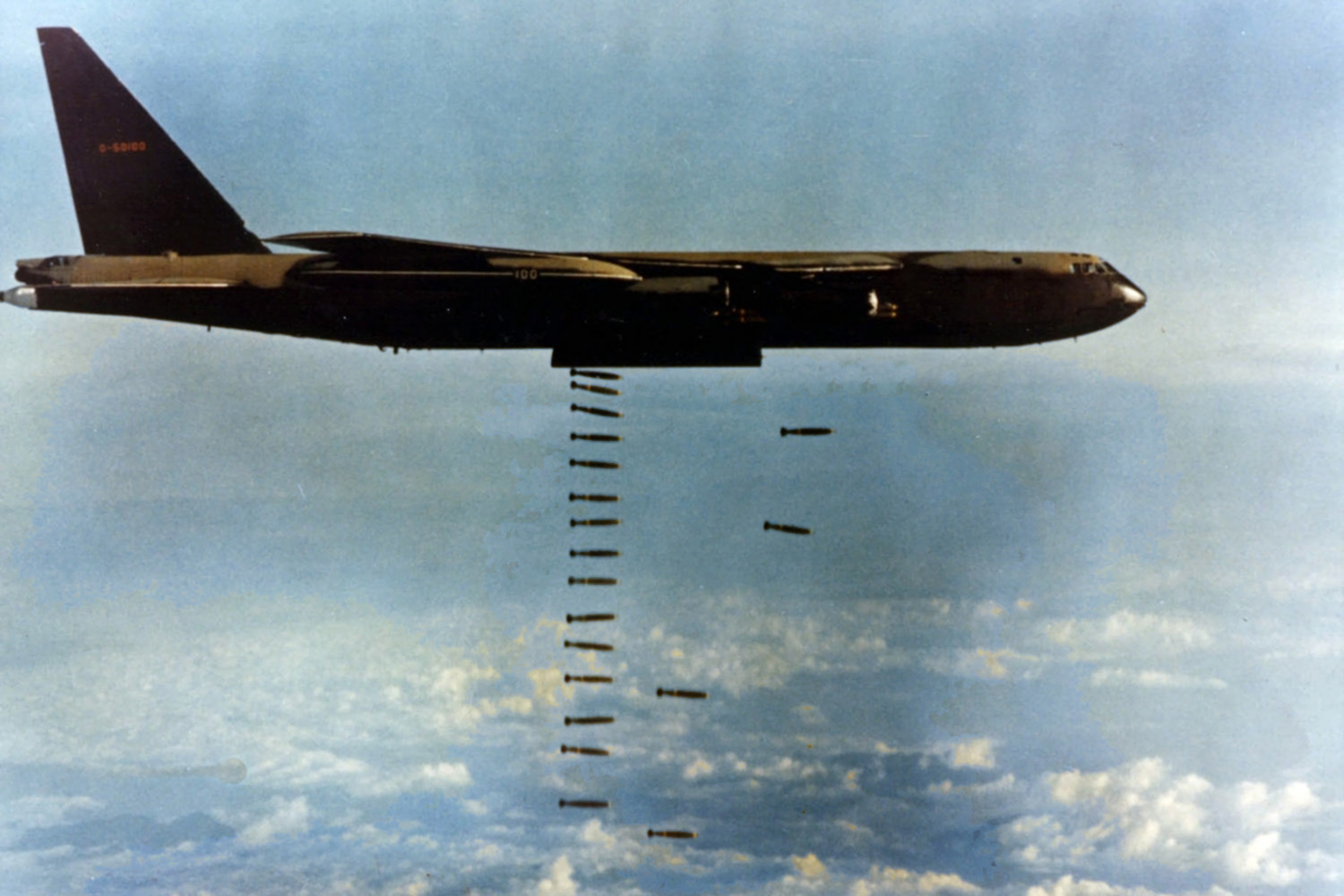
B-52D Dropping bombs over Southeast Asia

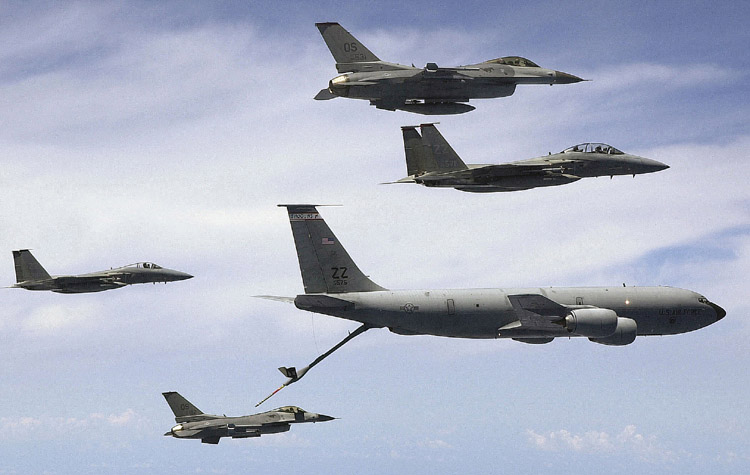
KC-135 refueling F-15s and F-16s

With the end of fighting in Korea, President Dwight D. Eisenhower, who had taken office in January 1953, called for a "new look" at national defense. The result: a greater reliance on nuclear weapons and air power to deter war. His administration chose to invest in the Air Force, especially Strategic Air Command. The nuclear arms race shifted into high gear. The Air Force retired nearly all of its propeller-driven B-29/B-50s and they were replaced by new Boeing B-47 Stratojet aircraft. By 1955 the Boeing B-52 Stratofortress would be entering the inventory in substantial numbers, as prop B-36s were phased out of heavy bombardment units rapidly.

Also after the deployment of forces to Far East Air Force in order to engage in combat over Korea, the history of Fifteenth Air Force becomes indistinguishable from that of Strategic Air Command. During the Cold War, Fifteenth Air Force aircraft stood nuclear alert, providing a deterrence against an attack on the United States by the Soviet Union. During the Vietnam War, squadrons of 15th Air Force B-52 Stratofortesses (B-52Ds mostly, some B-52Gs) were deployed to bases on Guam, Okinawa and Thailand conducting Arc Light strikes on communist forces.

The 15th Air Force also included missile squadrons, such as the 703d Strategic Missile Wing and 706th Strategic Missile Wing.

Between the Vietnam War and 1991, 15 AF units and assets consisted of reconnaissance aircraft (SR-71 until 1989, U-2), bombers (B-52D until 1984, B-52G, B-52H and B-1B), aerial refueling (KC-135, KC-10), and intercontinental ballistic missiles (Titan II until 1984, Minuteman II/III, Peacekeeper).

== Post–Cold War and 21st-century ==
Fifteenth Air Force became exclusively an aerial tanker formation with KC-135 and KC-10 aircraft on 1 September 1991. When Strategic Air Command was inactivated on 1 June 1992 and its assets divided between the newly created Air Mobility Command and Air Combat Command, Fifteenth Air Force became part of Air Mobility Command.

Headquarters Fifteenth Air Force moved from March Air Force Base to Travis Air Force Base on 2 July 1993 with the BRAC transition of March AFB to March Air Reserve Base, and merged its tankers with the airlift aircraft of the Twenty-Second Air Force. The Twenty-Second Air Force's flag moved to the Air Force Reserve Command at Dobbins Air Force Base, Georgia.

Fifteenth Air Force was one of the two numbered air forces assigned to the Air Mobility Command. Its main area of operations was the region stretching west of the Mississippi River to the east coast of Africa, pole to pole, but was often tasked to support Air Mobility Command's global reach mission. Its primary mission was to provide strategic and theater airlift for all Department of Defense agencies as well as air refueling for the Air Force in both peace and wartime. This included the aeromedical evacuation of sick and injured.

With the assigned military work force of 28,912 personnel and an assigned civilian work force of 5,288 people, Fifteenth Air Force managed almost 300 aircraft and many support facilities in the United States and in the Pacific and Indian Oceans – all the way to Diego Garcia.

The 15 AF commander was also the Commander, Task Force 294 (TF 294), which provided aerial refueling to aircraft that supported the United States Strategic Command (USSTRATCOM) in time of war. TF 294 included 26 units from the AMC, the Air National Guard, and the Air Force Reserve Command. The 15 AF staff assured the operational readiness of its units by conducting readiness assessment visits and staff assistance visits. It acted as an advocate for its subordinate units and enforces higher headquarters policies and directives.

As a result of an Air Mobility Command restructuring, Fifteenth Air Force was redesignated the Fifteenth Expeditionary Mobility Task Force, focused on air mobility support in peacetime and wartime. 15 AF operational flying organizations were transferred to Eighteenth Air Force. 15 EMTF retained AMC's Pacific region airlift and air refueling enroute support organization as well as AMC's contingency response units. The 15 EMTF provided rapid and flexible transportation support from six major Air Force bases in the United States and 47 locations throughout the Pacific.

=== Forces from 2020 ===
15 AF is responsible for operational readiness for thirteen active duty operational groups and wings, one air base wing, and three combat engineer squadrons.

Operational wings and groups:

- 1st Fighter Wing, Joint Base Langley–Eustis, Virginia
- 4th Fighter Wing, Seymour Johnson AFB, North Carolina
- 20th Fighter Wing, Shaw AFB, South Carolina
- 23d Wing, Moody AFB, Georgia
- 33rd Fighter Wing, Eglin AFB, Florida
- 56th Fighter Wing, Luke AFB, Arizona
- 93d Air-Ground Operations Wing, Moody AFB, Georgia
- 325th Fighter Wing, Tyndall AFB, Florida
- 355th Wing (Davis-Monthan AFB, Arizona) – A-10C Thunderbolt II, HC-130J Combat King II, HH-60G Pave Hawk
- 366th Fighter Wing (Mountain Home AFB, Idaho) – F-15E Strike Eagle
- 388th Fighter Wing (Hill AFB, Utah) – F-35A Lightning II
- 432d Air Expeditionary Wing (Creech AFB, Nevada) – MQ-9A Reaper, RQ-170A Sentinel
- 461st Air Control Wing, Robins AFB, Georgia
- 495th Fighter Group
- 552d Air Control Wing (Tinker AFB, Oklahoma) – E-3B/C/G Sentry

Air Base wing:

- 633d Air Base Wing, Joint Base Langley-Eustis, Virginia

Rapid Engineer Deployable Heavy Operational Repair Squadron Engineers (RED HORSE) squadrons:

- 819th RED HORSE Squadron, Malmstom AFB, Montana
- 820th RED HORSE Squadron (Nellis AFB, Nevada)
- 823d Red Horse Squadron, Hurlburt Field, Florida

The Fifteenth Air Force is also responsible for overseeing the operational readiness of designated units of the Air National Guard and Air Force Reserve.

== Lineage ==
- Constituted as Fifteenth Air Force on 30 October 1943.

Activated on 1 November 1943
Inactivated on 15 September 1945

- Activated on 31 March 1946

Inactivated on 1 October 2003
Redesignated and activated as 15th Expeditionary Mobility Task Force, 1 October 2003
Inactivated on 20 March 2012
Redesignated Fifteenth Air Force on 30 March 2012 (remained inactive)

- Activated on 20 August 2020

== Assignments ==
- Headquarters, United States Army Air Forces, 1 November 1943 – February 1944
- United States Strategic Air Forces, February 1944 – 31 March 1946
- Strategic Air Command, 15 September 1946 – 1 January 1992
- Air Mobility Command, 1 January 1992 – 1 October 2003
- Eighteenth Air Force, 1 October 2003 – 20 March 2012
- Air Combat Command, 20 August 2020

== Components ==
World War II Wings

- 5th Bombardment: 1943–1945.
- 42d Bombardment: 1943
- 47th Bombardment: 1944–1945
- 49th Bombardment: 1944–1945
- 55th Bombardment: 1944–1945
- 304th Bombardment: 1943–1945.
- 305th Bombardment: 1943–1945
- 306th Fighter: 1944–1945
- 307th Bombardment: 1944.

Postwar Air Divisions

- 1st Strategic Aerospace Division, 1 September 1988 – 1 September 1991
- 4th Air Division, 31 March 1970 – 23 August 1988
- 12th Air Division, 10 February 1951 – 16 June 1952; 16 June 1952 – 1 July 1989
- 13th Strategic Missile Division, 1 July 1959 – 1 July 1963; 1 July 1965 – 2 July 1966
- 14th Air Division, 10 February 1951 – 16 June 1952; 16 June 1952 – 1 September 1991
- 17th Air Division, 31 March 1970 – 30 June 1971
- 18th Strategic Aerospace Division, 1 July 1959 – 2 July 1968
- 21st Air Division, 16 July 1952 – 16 October 1952
- 22d Strategic Aerospace Division, 9 September 1960 – 1 July 1965
- 40th Air Division, 7 July 1989 – 14 June 1991
- 57th Air Division, 16 April 1951 – 16 June 1952; 16 June 1952 – 4 September 1956; January 1975 – 14 June 1991
- 58th Air Division, 31 March – 1 November 1946
- 73d Air Division, 31 March – 31 May 1946
- 311th Air Division, 1 May 1946 – 31 March 1947
- 802d Air Division, 28 May 1952 – 1 July 1955; 1 January 1959 – 20 June 1960
- 810th Strategic Aerospace Division, 1 April 1955 – 1 July 1963; 2 July 1966 – 30 June 1971
- 813th Strategic Aerospace Division, 15 July 1959 – 2 July 1966
- 818th Air Division 11 October 1954 – 1 July 1955
- 819th Strategic Aerospace Division, 1 February 1956 – 1 July 1965
- 821st Strategic Aerospace Division, 1 January 1959 – 30 June 1971

== List of commanders ==
No.	Commander		Term		
No.	Portrait	Name	Took office	Left office	Term length
1	Chad P. Franks	Major General; Chad P. Franks	20 August 2020	13 August 2021	358 days
2	Michael G. Koscheski	Major General; Michael G. Koscheski	13 August 2021	5 January 2024	2 years, 145 days
3	David B. Lyons	Major General; David B. Lyons	5 January 2024	13 November 2025	1 year, 312 days
4	Steven Behmer	Major General; Steven Behmer	13 November 2025	Incumbent	353 days

== Stations ==
- Tunis, Tunisia, 1 November – 31 December 1943
- Bari Airfield, Italy, 1 December 1943 – 31 March 1946
- Colorado Springs, Colorado, 15 September 1946 – 7 November 1949
- March AFB, California, 7 November 1949 – 1 January 1992
- Travis AFB, California, 1 January 1992 – 20 March 2012
- Shaw AFB, South Carolina, 20 August 2020

== Notes ==
- Maurer, Maurer (1983). Air Force Combat Units of World War II. Maxwell AFB, Alabama: Office of Air Force History. ISBN 0-89201-092-4.
- Ravenstein, Charles A. (1984). Air Force Combat Wings Lineage and Honors Histories 1947–1977. Maxwell AFB, Alabama: Office of Air Force History. ISBN 0-912799-12-9.
