= 306th Fighter Wing =

356th Special Operations Wing
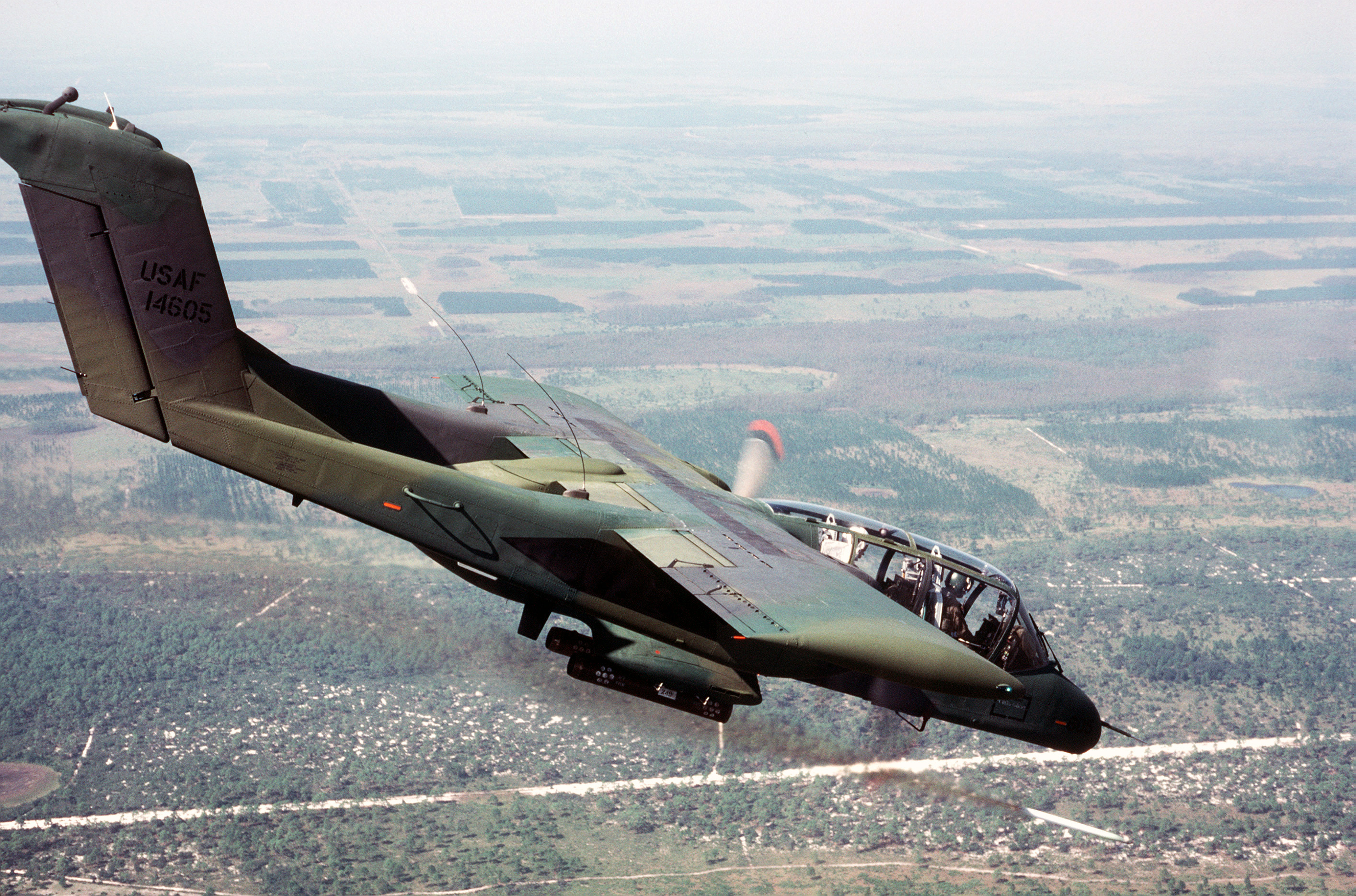
- OV-10 Bronco firing white phosphorus
- Active: 1943–1945; 1975
- Country: United States
- Branch: United States Air Force
- Role: Fighter, Special Operations
- Engagements: Mediterranean Theater of Operations Vietnam War

The 306th Fighter Wing (306th FW) was a World War II United States Army Air Forces organization assigned to Fifteenth Air Force as an intermediate-level command and control organization. It was last stationed at Drew Field, Florida and was inactivated on 7 November 1945.

== History ==
=== World War II ===
The first predecessor of the 356th Special Operations Wing was the 306th Fighter Wing of World War II.

Constituted originally as the 306th Bombardment Wing (Heavy) on 7 December 1943. Activated in Italy on 15 January 1944. Assigned to Fifteenth Air Force.

Entered combat in Mar as a fighter organization. Redesignated 306th Fighter Wing in May 1944. Operated in the Mediterranean and European theaters until the end of the war.

Moved to the US, July–August 1945. Inactivated on 7 November 1945.

=== Vietnam War ===
The second predecessor of the wing was the 656th Special Operations Wing, which replaced the 56th Special Operations Wing in Thailand in 1975.

=== Consolidation and redesignation ===
The two wings were consolidated as the 356th Special Operations Wing in 1985, but have not been active since.

== Lineage ==
306th Fighter Wing

- Constituted as the 306th Bombardment Wing (Heavy) on 7 December 1943

Activated on 15 January 1944.
Redesignated 306th Fighter Wing in May 1944
Inactivated on 7 November 1945

- Consolidated with the 656th Special Operations Wing as the 356th Special Operations Wing on 31 July 1985

656th Special Operations Wing

- Established as the 656th Special Operations Wing on 14 May 1975 (not organized)

Activated on 30 June 1975
Inactivated on 22 September 1975.

- Consolidated with the 306th Fighter Wing as the 356th Special Operations Wing on 31 July 1985

=== Assignments ===
- Fifteenth Air Force, 15 January 1944 – 15 July 1945
- Third Air Force, August − 7 November 1945
- Thirteenth Air Force, 30 June 1975
- 17th Air Division, 1 July – 22 September 1975

=== Stations ===
- Bari Airfield, Italy, 15 January 1944
- Foggia Airfield, Italy, 27 January 1944
- Lucera Airfield, Italy, 23 February 1944
- Torremaggiore, Italy, 8 March 1944
- Lesina Airfield, Italy, 3 September 1944
- Fano Airfield, Italy, 5 March – 15 July 1945
- Drew Field, Florida, August −7 November 1945
- Nakhon Phanom Airport, Thailand, 30 June – 22 September 1975

=== Components ===
Groups

- 1st Fighter Group, 27 March – November 1944
- 14th Fighter Group, 1 November 1943 – 27 March 1944
- 31st Fighter Group, 2 April 1944 – 13 June 1945
- 52d Fighter Group, 14 May 1944 – 13 June 1945
- 82d Fighter Group, 27 March 1944 – 13 June 1945
- 325th Fighter Group, December 1943 – 13 June 1945
- 332d Fighter Group, 28 May 1944 – 13 June 1945

Squadrons

- 21st Special Operations Squadron, attached 30 June – 22 September 1975
- 23rd Flying Training Squadron, attached 30 June – 22 September 1975

=== Aircraft ===
- P-47 Thunderbolt, 1943–1944
- P-51 Mustang, 1944–1945
- Sikorsky CH-53, 1975
- North American OV-10 Bronco, 1975
