= Pétfürdő =

Coordinates: 47°9′31.18″N 18°7′25.43″E

- Coat of arms

- Location of Veszprém county in Hungary
- Country: Hungary
- County: Veszprém

Area
  - Total: 1,732 km^{2} (669 sq mi)

Population (2004)
  - Total: 4,891
  - Density: 698.71/km^{2} (1,809.7/sq mi)
- Time zone: UTC+1 (CET)
  - Summer (DST): UTC+2 (CEST)
- Postal code: 8105
- Area code: 88

Pétfürdő is a large village in Veszprém county, Hungary. During the Oil Campaign of World War II, the Pétfürdő oil refinery and the nitrogen fertilizer plant were bombed by the United States Army Air Forces.
