= Lucera Airfield =

Lucera Airfield
- Part of Fifteenth Air Force
- Province of Foggia, Italy
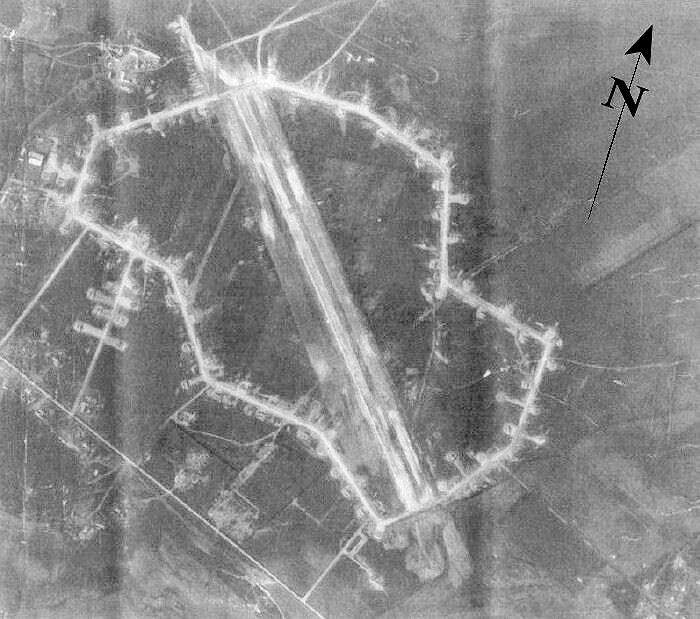
- Lucera Airfield, Italy, 1944

Site information
- Type: Military airfield
- Controlled by: United States Army Air Forces

Location
- Location of Lucera Airfield, Italy
- Coordinates: 41°29′42″N 015°25′41″E

Site history
- Built: 1943
- In use: 1944-1945
- Battles/wars: World War II

Lucera Airfield is an abandoned World War II military airfield in Italy. It was located 7.9 kilometers east of Lucera, in the Province of Foggia. The airfield was abandoned and dismantled after the end of the war in 1945.

== History ==
Lucera Airfield a temporary wartime facility, built by the US Army Corps of Engineers. Construction was initiated shortly after Allied forces seized control of the Tavoliere plain around Foggia, Apulia, Italy.

The major tenant of the airfield was the 301st Bombardment Group, which arrived from either Torretta, San Giovanni, Giulia or Stornara Airfield in the Cerignola area of Italy on 1 February 1944. It was equipped with Boeing B-17 Flying Fortress bombers.

The 301st Bomb Group consisted of four squadrons:

- 32d Bombardment Squadron
- 352d Bombardment Squadron
- 353d Bombardment Squadron
- 419th Bombardment Squadron

The airfield had parallel, 6,000' x 100' asphalt runways laid over Pierced Steel Planking, oriented 13/31. There were two perimeter tracks, one on each side of the runways. There may have been some temporary hangars and buildings; however, it appears that personnel were quartered primarily in tents, and most aircraft maintenance took place in the open on hardstands. It also had a steel control tower.

With the end of the war in 1945, the 301st returned to the United States at the end of July, heading to Sioux Falls Army Air Field, South Dakota to become part of the new Strategic Air Command. They were replaced by the Twelfth Air Force 100th and 301st Fighter Squadrons, part of the Tuskegee Airmen 332d Fighter Group moved to Lucera in July from their wartime base at Ramitelli Airfield, while awaiting demobilization orders. The Tuskegee Airmen remained at Lucera until the end of September when they departed for the United States and subsequent demobilization.

Sometime after that departure, the engineers moved in and dismantled the facility. Today Lucera Airfield has been returned to agriculture; however, extensive scarring of the landscape remains, showing various dispersal pads and taxiways and other features.

== See also ==
- Boeing B-17 Flying Fortress airfields in the Mediterranean Theater of Operations
