= Foggia Airfield Complex =

Italian WWII military installation

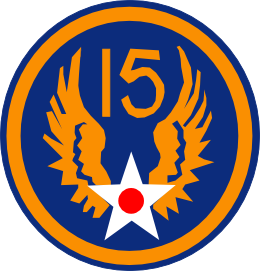
Foggia Airfield Complex

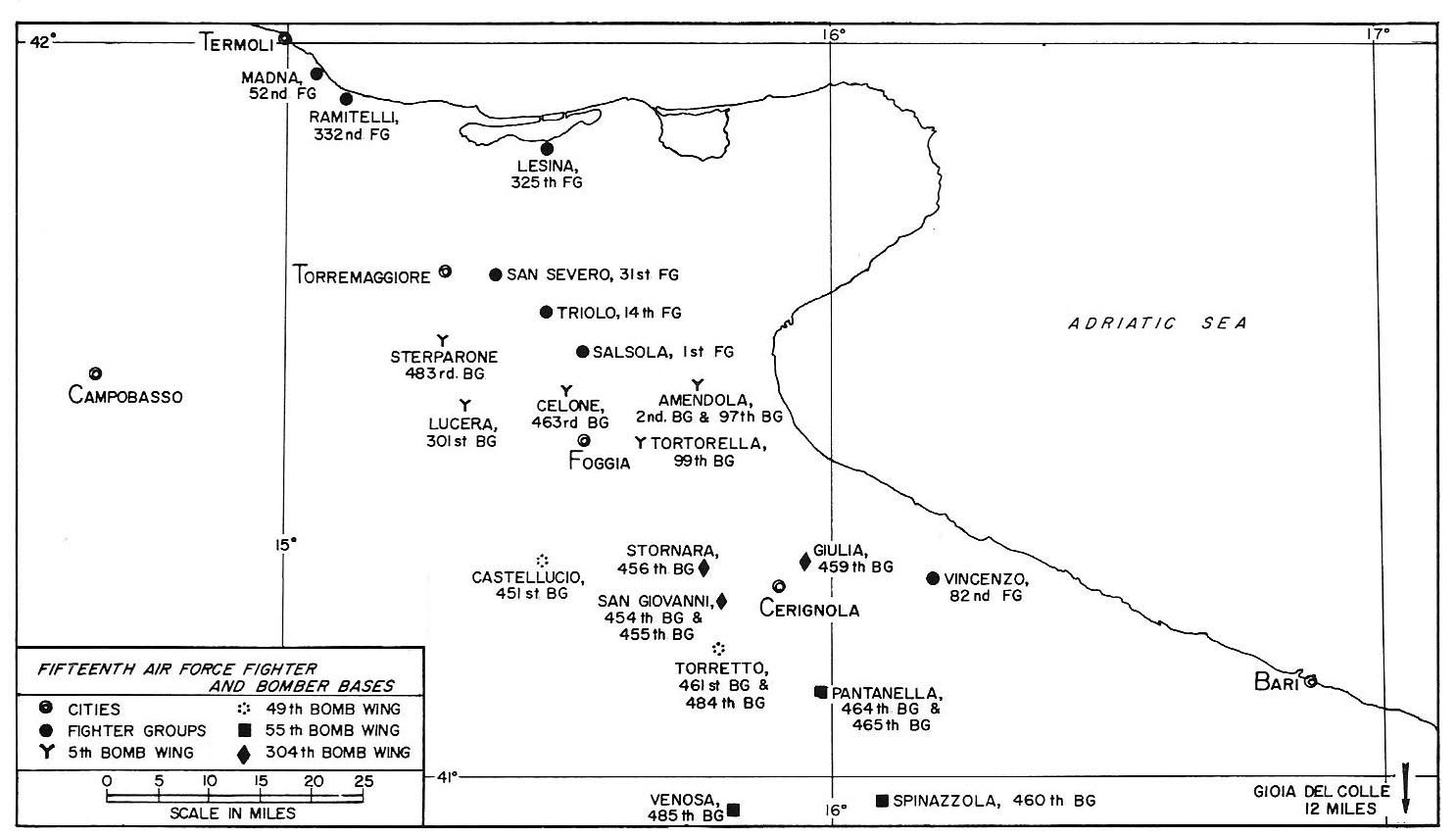
- World War II airfields within 40 km (25 miles) of Foggia

Site information
- Type: Military airfields

Site history
- Built: 1920s-1944

Location of World War II military airfields in the Province of Foggia

The Foggia Airfield Complex was a series of World War II military airfields located within a 40 km (25 mi) radius of Foggia, in the Province of Foggia, in southern Italy. The airfields were used by the United States Army Air Forces' Fifteenth Air Force as part of the strategic bombardment campaign against Nazi Germany in 1944 and 1945, as well as the Twelfth Air Force, the British Royal Air Force and the South African Air Force during the Italian Campaign (1943–1945).

== History ==
Before World War II, the Italian Royal Air Force Regia Aeronautica constructed a series of airfields in the Foggia area. They consisted of hard-surfaced runways and taxiways, concrete parking areas and permanent buildings for the support units and barracks.

After the Armistice between Italy and Allied armed forces in September, 1943 these airfields were seized by the German Luftwaffe. While under Axis control, the airfields were heavily bombed by the U.S. Army Air Forces and Royal Air Force in 1943 before being seized by the British Eighth Army in October 1943 during the Italian Campaign.

After the area was captured, the facilities were repaired by the United States Army Corps of Engineers (COE) to make them usable for heavy bomber operations by the new Fifteenth Air Force and the Royal Air Force. Weather in southern Italy was much better than in England where the Eighth Air Force was conducting daylight strategic bombing of Occupied Europe and Nazi Germany. Using the Foggia Airfield Complex for strategic bombing missions would allow Allied heavy bombers to attack targets in France, Germany, Austria and the Balkans which were inaccessible from England. In addition to the air forces, Foggia was a major Allied command center for ground forces in southern Italy and naval forces operating in the Adriatic Sea, with numerous headquarters being assigned.

In addition to the captured airfields, several temporary and semi-permanent airfields were constructed for operations by both Twelfth and Fifteenth Air Force and RAF units. These airfields, by and large, consisted of grass or Pierced Steel Planking (PSP) runways and parking and dispersal areas, with support structures quickly constructed out of wood or tents, along with (if needed) a temporary steel control tower. Six-man tents were used for billeting, lined up in rows with the orderly room and the mess hall at one end. There was one dimly lit light bulb at the center of each tent. The tent floor was grass or more commonly dirt. Eventually, plywood was scavenged for flooring, wooden cots were used for beds, and ubiquitous 55-gallon drums were converted into stoves and other items. As many of these airfields were captured from the Italians and Germans, wrecked enemy aircraft were a common sight, with metal from their fuselages and wings, glass and other useful parts finding their way into the support areas.

By mid-1944, about two dozen airfields were in operation in the Foggia area supporting strategic bombing missions; escort missions; tactical fighter operations, reconnaissance and air defense missions. Albert Speer, Hitler's Minister for Armaments, declared:

I could see omens of the war's end almost every day in the blue southern sky when, flying provocatively low, the bombers of the American Fifteenth Air Force crossed the Alps from their Italian bases to attack German Industrial targets.

With the end of the war in May 1945, most of the airfields were abandoned and the land returned to the owners, or the Italian government.

Today, most of the airfields are long since returned to agriculture, and little or no evidence remains of their use as wartime airfields. A few, however, still exist as commercial airports and one is still used by the Italian Air Force (Aeronautica Militare).

== Airfields and units ==
The airfield complex consisted of the following major airfields. In addition, there were numerous auxiliary landing airstrips not listed.

=== Amendola Airfield ===
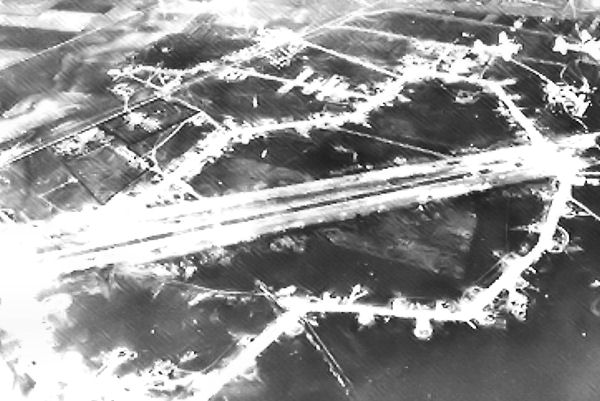
Amendola Airfield, 1944

Now Amendola Air Base (ICAO: LIBA)

Located approximately 16 km (9.9 mi) northeast of Foggia. 41°32′29.98″N 015°42′44.92″E

Captured Regia Aeronautica airfield used by Fifteenth Air Force, primarily for heavy bombardment units. Repaired by COE in September 1943 and put into use immediately. Last USAAF unit left in March 1946 and airfield turned over to Allied Italian Co-Belligerent Air Force (Aviazione Cobelligerante Italiana, or ACI). Today Italian Air Force (Aeronautica Militare) air base. Extensive remains of wartime use are visible in aerial photography.

- 2d Bombardment Group, (Boeing B-17 Flying Fortress), 19 November 1945 – 28 February 1946
- 57th Fighter Group, (Republic P-47 Thunderbolt), 27 October 1943 – 1 March 1944
- 97th Bombardment Group, ([B-17 Flying Fortress), 16 January 1944 – 1 October 1945
- 321st Bombardment Group, (North American B-25 Mitchell medium bombers), 20 November 1943 – 14 January 1944
- 330 Wing RAF (142 and 150 Squadrons) (Wellington X medium bomber), Feb 1944 - Jul 1944

=== Bari Airfield ===
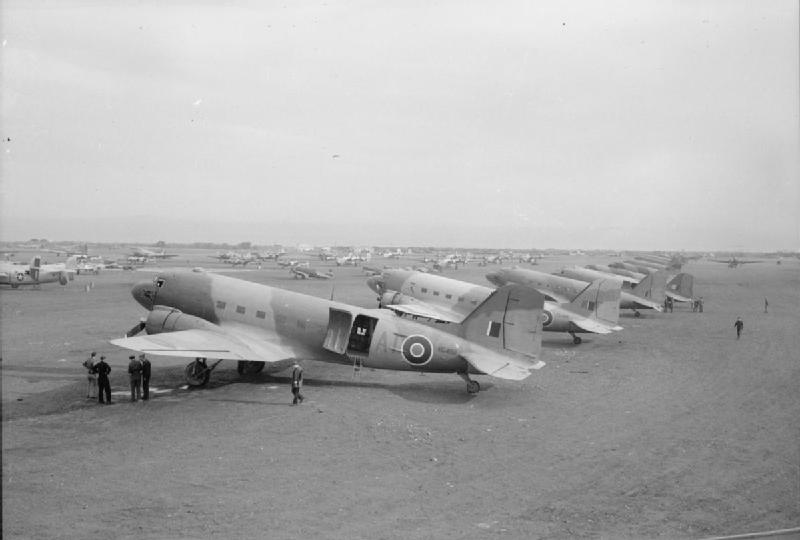
Douglas Dakota Mark III transports of No. 267 Squadron RAF lined up at Bari Airfield

Now Bari International Airport (Italian: Aeroporto di Bari) (IATA: BRI, ICAO: LIBD)

Located approximately 7 km (4.3 mi) west of Bari. 41°08′19.41″N 016°45′41.24″E

Captured Regia Aeronautica airfield used by Fifteenth Air Force as command and control facility, using airfield for basing reconnaissance and liaison units. Last USAAF unit left in September 1945 and airfield turned over to allied Italian Co-Belligerent Air Force. Military airfield until the late 1960s when opened for civilian airline use. Today evidence of wartime use still visible in older military airfield area.

- HQ Fifteenth Air Force, 1 December 1943 – 15 September 1945
- XII Bomber Command, December 1943 – 4 January 1944
- 55th Bombardment Wing, 9 July – 9 September 1945
- 305th Bombardment Wing, March–December 1944
- 306th Fighter Wing, 15–27 January 1944
- 307th Bombardment Wing, 15 January – 15 June 1944
- 5th Reconnaissance Group, (photoreconnaissance F-5 (Lockheed P-38 Lightning), 28 December 1944 – October 1945

=== Ascoli Field ===
Construction stopped and cancelled. Runway was to be 150 ft x 6,000 ft with 62 hardstands 41°12′40″N 015°30′00″E

=== Biferno Airfield ===
Abandoned airfield The airfields runway was located almost on and parallel to the shore. 41°58′00″N 015°2′55″E It was in use by the Balkan (Yugoslav), Desert (RAF), South African and 15th (US) Air Forces, as well as by the Italian Cobellligerent Air Force. completely swallowed-up by the rising Adriatic Sea

=== Canne Airfield ===
Located approximately 2.2 miles South-east of Campomarino, 41°55′58″N 015°4′14″E it is now mostly agricultural land. The airfield was named after grass plants still growing around field edges. The houses of Cianaluca have been built on the original hardstand parking bays. The old runway was made of PSP, many pieces of which are now used as garden seats and roofs of small sheds in the vicinity. The old headquarters can be seen, as well as what may have been the Officers' Mess building, now a two-storey building. The runway and taxiway were composed of concrete reinforced with large limestone pebbles still showing near the start of old runway. It was used by No. 241 Squadron RAF (Spitfires) December 1943 – May 1944 and afterwards by parts of Italian Co-belligerent Air Force, and Yugoslav Air Force until end of war. The Campomarino council has now put up signs for all five of airfields in the immediate area, and has erected memorials to "All airmen who flew from Biferno, Canne, Madna, Ramitelli, and Nuova airfields during World War II."

=== Castelluccio Airfield ===
Abandoned, was located approximately 15 km (9.3 mi) south of Foggia, 41°19′11.69″N 015°32′40.71″E

Semi-permanent heavy bomber airfield used by Fifteenth Air Force. Built by COE in early 1944 with one PSP runway with extensive taxiway and hardstand parking areas. Steel control tower. Opened 15 March 1944. Last combat operations flown in late April 1945. Closed August 1945. Today is agricultural area with no structures or any facilities in existence, faint scarring of land shows remains of main runway, taxiways and hardstands visible in aerial photography.

- 451st Bombardment Group, (B-24 Liberator), 6 April 1944 – June 1945

=== Celone Airfield (Foggia #1) ===
Abandoned German fighter base, was located approximately 1 km (0.62 mi) west-northwest of Foggia, 41°33′4″N 015°33′32″E

Semi-permanent heavy bomber airfield used by Fifteenth Air Force. Built by COE in early 1944 with one 6,000-foot-long PSP runway with extensive taxiway and hardstand parking areas. Steel control tower. Opened 15 February 1944. Last combat operations flown in late April 1945. Closed October 1945. Today is agricultural area with no structures or any facilities in existence, very faint scarring of land shows remains of main runway, taxiways and hardstands visible in aerial photography.

- 463d Bombardment Group, (B-17 Flying Fortress), 9 March 1944 – 25 September 1945
- 178 Squadron RAF (Liberator), Mar 1944 - Jul 1944
- 614 Squadron RAF (Halifax), Mar 1944 - May 1944
- 31 Squadron SAAF (Liberator), Jun 1944 - Sep 1945
- 34 Squadron SAAF (Liberator), Jul 1944 - Sep 1945

=== Cerignola airfields ===
Abandoned, was located 6-miles west of Cerignola, 41°14′32.42″N 015°48′18.90″E

note: airfield name is not listed in the Corp of Engineering Plans dated 1 June 1944 - marked on Vesuvio, Italy Aeronautical chart dated 1 March 1945

Captured Regia Aeronautica airfields used by Twelfth and Fifteenth Air Force for both heavy bombers and tactical fighters. Also major command and control headquarters. Opened late 1943 with combat operations commencing as soon as operationally capable. Last combat operations flown in mid 1944, used by 526th Air Service Group until July 1945 as support base. Closed afterwards. Very clear outline visible today in aerial photography.

- Headquarters 304th Bombardment Wing in Cerignola town, 29 December 1943-September 1945
- 97th Bombardment Group, (B-17 Flying Fortress), 20 December 1943 – 16 January 1944
- 57th Fighter Group, (P-47 Thunderbolt), March 1944
- 301st Bombardment Group, (B-17 Flying Fortress), 7 December 1943 – 1 February 1944
- 456th Bombardment Group (B-24 Liberator), January 1944
- 330 Wing RAF (142 Squadron RAF and 150 Squadrons) (Wellington X), Dec 1943 - Feb * 330 Wing RAF (142 and 150 Squadrons) (Wellington X), Dec 1943 - Feb 1944

Correction

There was no Cerignola airfield per se. Cerignola town hosted the headquarters of 304 Bomb Wing, a command unit, not an operational one. Cerignola here conflates four separate airfields located to the west of the town: San Giovanni, Giulia, Stornara and Torretta, listed separately below. The Bomb Groups under 304 Bomb Wing's command, operated out of San Giovanni, Giulia and Stornara. 301 Bomb Group operated temporarily out of Giulia, and 330 Wing RAF, temporarily out of Torretta. The grid reference given is for San Giovanni, which is indeed visible in aerial photography.

=== Foggia Airfield ===
Now Foggia-Gino Lisa Airport (Italian: Aeroporto di Foggia) (IATA: FOG, ICAO: LIBF)

Located approximately 3 km (1.9 mi) southwest of Foggia. 41°26′15″N 015°32′15″E

Captured Regia Aeronautica airfield used by Twelfth and Fifteenth Air Force as both operational airfield and as major command and control headquarters. Elevation 243', runway direction NNW ~ SSE, 400 x 6,000" sod & earth, 41 hardstands on compacted gravel. Open dispersal on east taxiway. Vacated February 1946 and turned over to Allied Italian Co-Belligerent Air Force (Aviazione Cobelligerante Italiana, or ACI). Today commercial airport.

- 306th Fighter Wing, 27 January – 23 February 1944
- 5th Bombardment Wing, December 1943 – 2 November 1945
- 57th Bombardment Wing, 29 October 1943 – 4 January 1944
- 2d Bombardment Group, B-17 Flying Fortress, 19 November 1945 – 28 February 1946
- 12th Bombardment Group, (B-25 Mitchell), 2 November 1943 – January 1944
- 57th Fighter Group, (P-47 Thunderbolt), 30 September – 27 October 1943
- 79th Fighter Group, (P-47 Thunderbolt), 9 October – 19 November 1943
- 325th Fighter Group, (P-47 Thunderbolt), 11 December 1943 – 29 March 1944
- 340th Bombardment Group, (B-25 Mitchell), 19 November 1943 – 2 January 1944
- 236 Wing RAF (40 and 104 Squadrons) (Wellington X, Liberator), Dec 1943 - Oct 1945

=== Giulia Airfield ===
Abandoned, was located 6 km (3.7 mi) northeast of Cerignola, 41°18′15″N 015°50′30″E

Semi-permanent heavy bomber airfield used by Fifteenth Air Force. Built by COE beginning in late 1943. One PSP runway NNW ~ SSE, 100 x 6,000 base of gravel and oiled subsurface; with extensive taxiway and 67 hardstand parking areas. Steel control tower. Opened January 1944. Supported B-24 Liberator operations, and airfield closed in late July 1945. Today is agricultural area with no structures or any facilities in existence. Almost no evidence of its visibility on aerial photography, however light land scarring of location of main runway is still faintly visible in aerial photography.

- 459th Bombardment Group, (B-24 Liberator), February 1944 – July 1945

=== Lesina Airfield ===
Abandoned, was located approximately 22 km (14 mi) east-southeast of Campomarino. Airfield was 150" x 5,500" of PSP with 43 hardstands 41°51′48″N 015°18′41″E.

Temporary airfield used by Twelfth and Fifteenth Air Force fighter units. Built by COE in early in 1944 with single main PSP runway, with large parking area for aircraft. Possibly steel control tower, and large containment area for personnel. Supported numerous fighter groups during 1944 and 1945, with last combat operations flown in September 1945 and closed and dismantled soon afterwards. Today is in agricultural area with little or no evidence of its existence. Former main runway now used as agricultural road.

- 306th Fighter Wing, 3 September 1944 – 5 March 1945
- 1st Fighter Group, (P-38 Lightning), March – 16 October 1945
- 14th Fighter Group, (P-38 Lightning), September 1945
- 52d Fighter Group, (P-51 Mustang), 8 July–August 1945
- 82d Fighter Group, (P-38 Lightning), 30 August – 9 September 1945
- 325th Fighter Group, (P-47 Thunderbolt), later (P-51 Mustang), 29 March 1944 – 5 March 1945

=== Lucera Airfield ===
Abandoned, was located approximately 13 km (8.1 mi) west-northwest of Foggia, 41°29′52.72″N 015°25′10″E

Semi-permanent heavy bomber airfield used by Fifteenth Air Force. Built by COE beginning in late 1943. One PSP runway with extensive taxiway and hardstand parking areas. Steel control tower. Opened early February 1944. Supported B-17 Flying Fortress operations as well as command and control headquarters. Last combat operations flown in late April 1945. Was home of P-51 Mustang equipped 332d Fighter Group "Tuskegee Airmen" while awaiting return to United States after war ended. Closed October 1945. Today it is an agricultural area with no structures or any facilities in existence, however light evidence of land scarring still is visible in aerial photography.

- 306th Fighter Wing, 23 February – 8 March 1944
- 301st Bombardment Group, (B-17 Flying Fortress), 1 February 1944 – 1945
- 332d Fighter Group, (P-51 Mustang), 18 July – September 1945

=== Madna Airfield ===
Located approximately 55 km (34 mi) southeast of Campomarino, on the Adriatic coast. Airfield was 150 x 6,000" of PSP with 85 hardstands 41°55′22″N 015°04′31″E.

Temporary airfield used by Twelfth and Fifteenth Air Force fighter groups beginning in November 1943 until end of war. Built by COE with PSP runway (possibly two) with parking area and possible blister hangars. Closed in May 1945 and dismantled. Today is in use as small private airfield, supporting operations of light general aviation aircraft. Remains of wartime runways visible although not in use.

- 52d Fighter Group, (P-51 Mustang), 19 May 1944 – 21 April 1945
- 79th Fighter Group, (P-47 Thunderbolt), 19 November 1943 – January 1944

=== Pantanella-Loconia-Canosa Landing Ground ===
Abandoned, was located approximately 5 miles south of Cerignola-10 miles west of Canosa. Field was 100" x 6,000" of PSP and Gravel with 62 hardstands, secondary runway was all weather 100 x 6,000" with an additional 62 hardstands 41°08′30″N 015°55′20″E.

Semi-permanent heavy bomber airfield used by Fifteenth Air Force. Built by COE in early 1944. Single (possibly double) PSP main runway with extensive taxiway and hardstand parking areas. Steel control tower. Opened March 1944. Very large and expansive facility used by two heavy bomb groups, composed of six operational squadrons. Capacity for approximately 150 heavy bombers with large support facilities with blister hangars as well as wooden structures. Airfield remained in operation until end of war, closing in July 1945. Abandoned and land returned to agricultural use. Faint scarring of land still visible from former airfield use visible on aerial photography, however little or no physical evidence on ground of existence.

- 464th Bombardment Group, (B-24 Liberator), March – 21 April 1944; 1 June 1944 – May 1945
- 465th Bombardment Group, (B-24 Liberator), April 1944–June 1945

=== Ramitelli Landing Ground ===
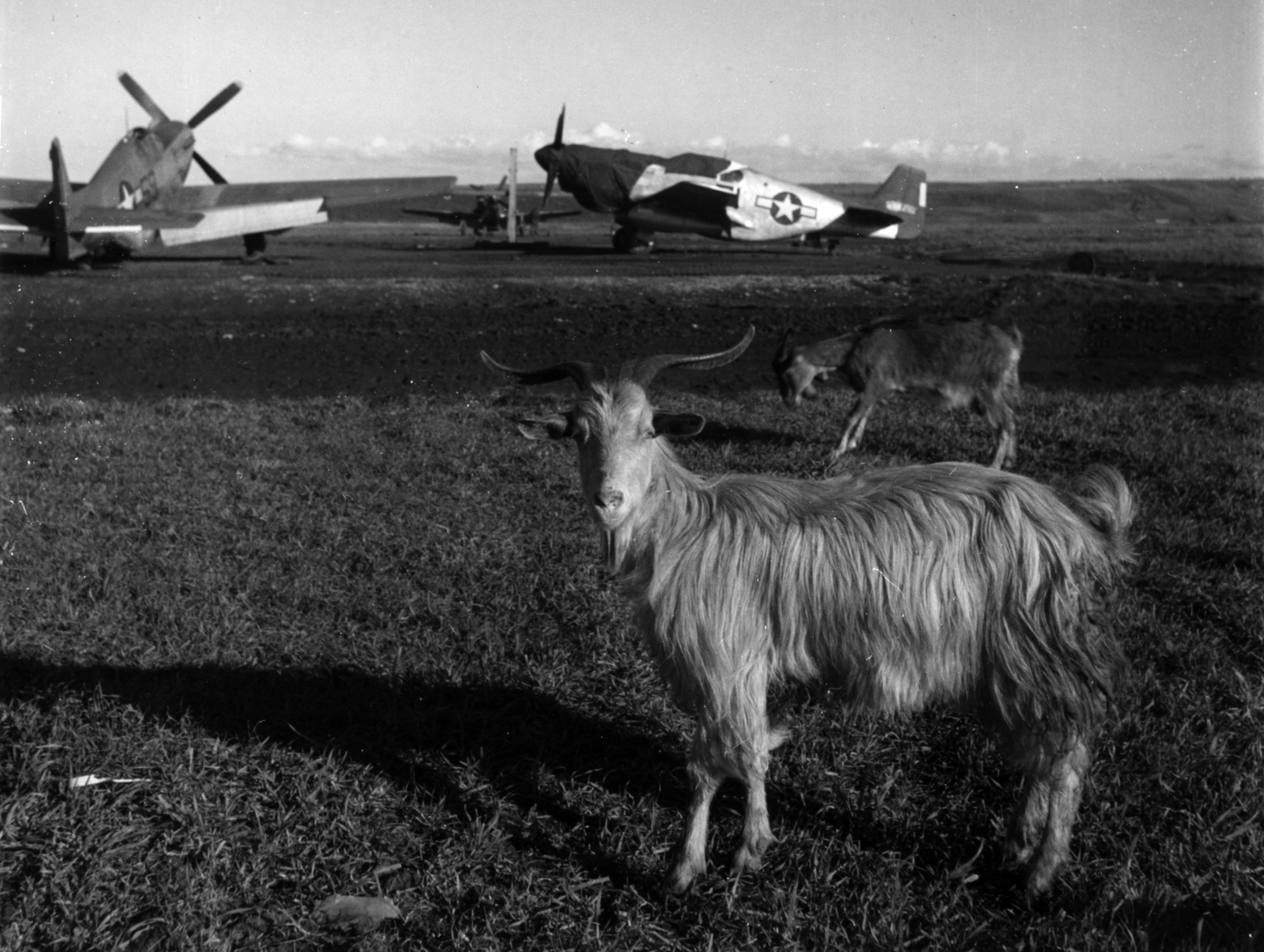
P-51C Mustang fighters from the 332nd Fighter Group at Ramitelli Airfield, with goats (March 1945)

Abandoned, Ramitelli Airfield was located approximately 4 miles south-southeast of Campomarino, on the Adriatic coast. Airfield was 150 x 5,500 PSP over gravel with 43 hardstands 41°53′43″N 015°07′08″E.

Temporary airfield used by Fifteenth Air Force 332d Fighter Group. PSP runway with parking area. Built by COE in early 1944. Used by 322d FG until end of war, used by 523d Air Service Group and 949th Air Engineering Squadron after May 1945, closing in October 1945 and airfield dismantled. Today no evidence of main runway visible on aerial photography, land completely returned to agricultural use. The original 332nd FG operations block is located .75-miles north from the field at 41°54′27″N 015°06′27″E.

- 332d Fighter Group, (P-47 Thunderbolt), later (P-51 Mustang), 28 May 1944 – 4 May 1945

=== Regina Field ===
Abandoned. Field was 150" x 6,000" of grass with 54 hardstands 41°37′00″N 015°23′00″E.

=== Salsola Airfield (Foggia Satellite #3) ===
Abandoned, was located approximately 3.5 miles north of Foggia. Field was 450' x 6,000" grass with 100 hardstands 41°32′54″N 015°27′27″E

Temporary airfield used by Fifteenth Air Force 1st Fighter Group. PSP runway with parking area. Built by COE in late 1943. Used by 1st FG until March 1945, closing in April 1945 and airfield dismantled. Today no evidence of existence visible on aerial photography, land completely returned to agricultural use.

- 1st Fighter Group, (P-38 Lightning), 8 January 1944 – 8 January 1945; 21 February–March 1945

=== San Giovanni Airfield ===
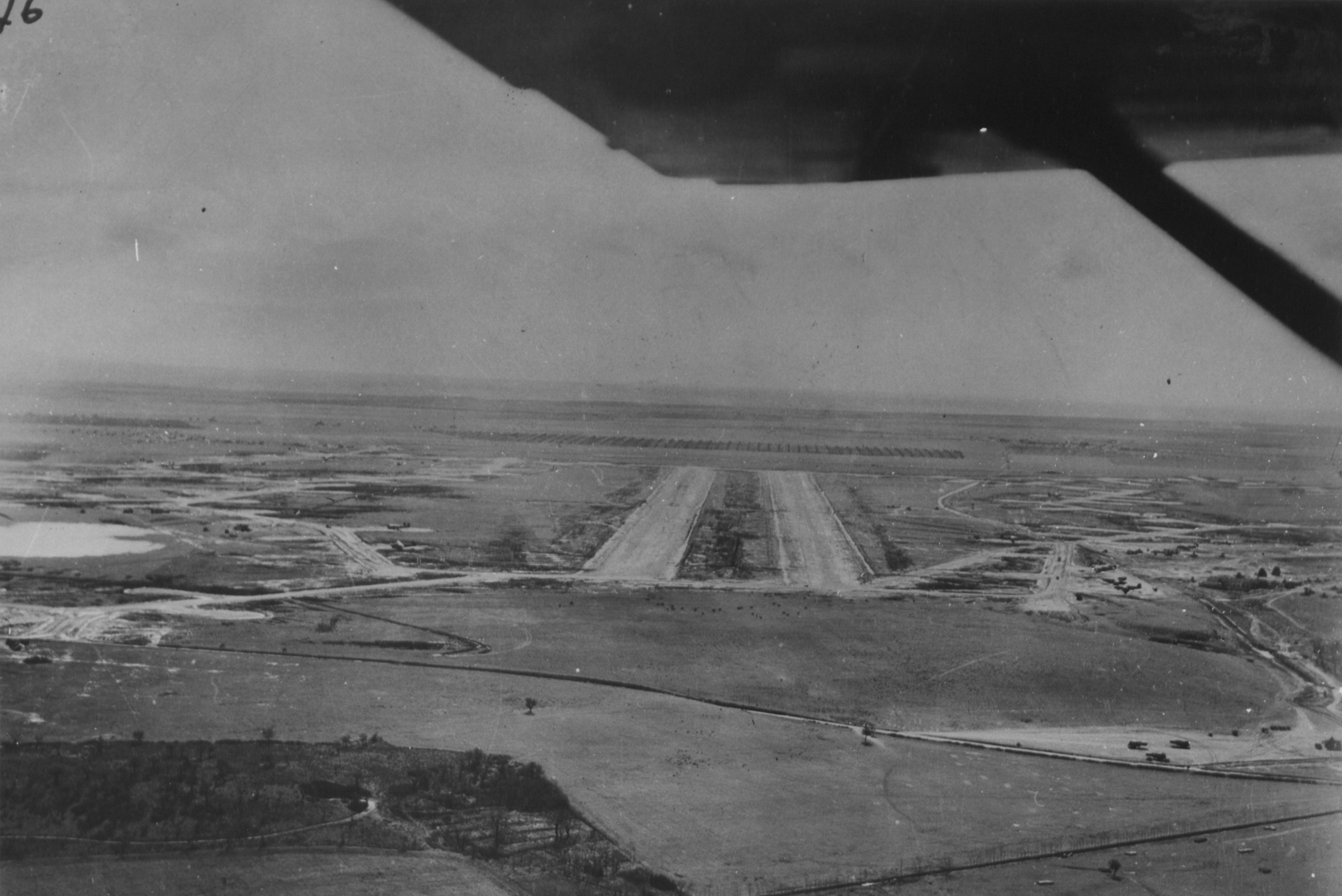
Aerial view of San Giovanni airfield in 1944

Abandoned, was located approximately 9 km (5.6 mi) west-southwest of Cerignola, 41°14′21.90″N 015°48′06.57″E

Semi-permanent heavy bomber airfield used by Fifteenth Air Force. Built by COE in late 1943. Single (possibly double) PSP main runway with extensive taxiway and hardstand parking areas. Steel control tower. Opened January 1944. Very large and expansive facility used by two heavy bomb groups, composed of eight operational squadrons. Capacity for approximately 150 heavy bombers with large support facilities to east of airfield with blister hangars as well as wooden structures. Airfield remained in operation until end of war, closing in October 1945. Abandoned and land returned to agricultural use. Faint scarring of land still visible from former airfield use visible on aerial photography, however little or no physical evidence on ground of existence.

- 454th Bombardment Group, (B-24 Liberator), 26 January 1944 – July 1945
- 455th Bombardment Group, (B-24 Liberator), 15 January 1944 – 9 September 1945

=== San Severo Airfield ===
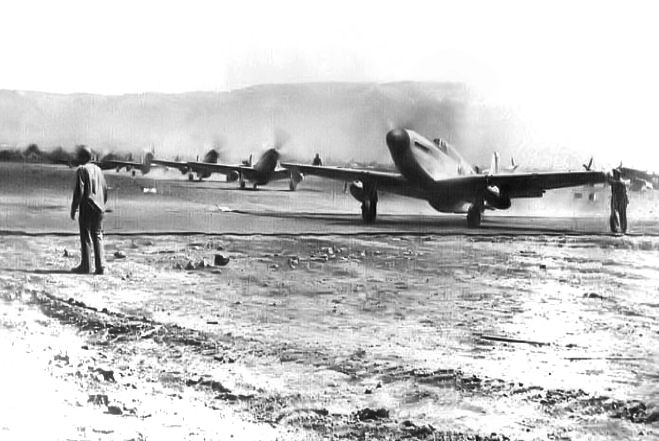
31st Fighter Group P-51s at San Severo Airfield

Abandoned, was located approximately 40 km (25 mi) north-northwest of Foggia, 41°42′45″N 015°25′48″E

Temporary airfield used primarily by 31st FG and Reconnaissance units of 15th Air Force. Built by COE in late September 1943; last combat operations flown in March 1945. Airfield closed in September 1945. Today is agricultural area with very clear existence in aerial photography of area.

- 90th Reconnaissance Wing, 1 December 1943- – 4 April 1945
- 3d Reconnaissance Group, (Various recon aircraft), 8 December 1943 – 4 January 1944
- 5th Reconnaissance Group, (Various recon aircraft), 8 December 1943 – 11 October 1944
- 31st Fighter Group, (P-51 Mustang), 2 April 1944 – 3 March 1945

=== Sinello Airfield ===
Abandoned 42°10′25″N 014°39′45″E

=== Spinazzola Airfield ===
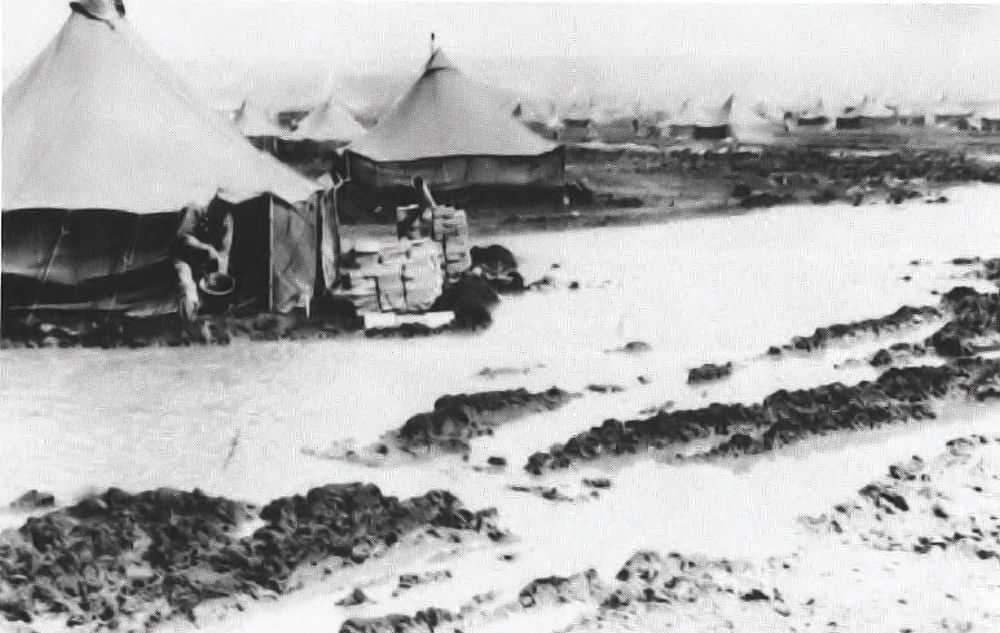
Early living conditions of the 460th Bombardment Group at Spinazzola

Abandoned, was located approximately 13 km (8.1 mi) east-southeast of Spinazzola, 40°56′57″N 016°13′46″E

Semi-permanent heavy bomber airfield used by Fifteenth Air Force. Built by COE beginning in September 1943. Single PSP runway with extensive taxiway and hardstand parking areas. Steel control tower. Opened January 1944. Airfield in operation until end of war, closing in August 1945. Abandoned and land returned to agricultural use. Faint scarring of land still visible from former airfield use visible on aerial photography.

- 55th Bombardment Wing, March–July 1944
- 305th Bombardment Wing, February–March 1944
- 460th Bombardment Group, (B-24 Liberator), 20 February 1944 – June 1945

=== Sterparone Airfield ===
Abandoned, was located 11.1 Kilometers south-southwest of San Severo, 41°36′06.28″N 015°18′24″E

Temporary heavy bomber airfield used by Fifteenth Air Force.

- 483d Bombardment Group, (B-17 Flying Fortress), April 1944 – 1945

=== Stornara Airfield ===
Abandoned, was located approximately 14 km (8.7 mi) west of Cerignola, 41°17′24.39″N 015°44′26.22″E

Semi-permanent heavy bomber airfield used by Fifteenth Air Force. Built by COE beginning in September 1943. Single PSP runway with extensive taxiway and hardstand parking areas. Steel control tower. Opened January 1944. Airfield in operation until end of war, closing in August 1945. Abandoned and land returned to agricultural use. Faint scarring of land still visible from former airfield use visible on aerial photography.

- 456th Bombardment Group, (B-24 Liberator), January 1944 – July 1945
- 614 Squadron RAF (Halifax), May 1944 - July 1944

=== Torretta Airfield ===
Abandoned, was located approximately 14 km (8.7 mi) southwest of Cerignola, 41°10′55″N 015°45′50″E

Semi-permanent heavy bomber airfield used by Fifteenth Air Force. Built by COE beginning in September 1943. Two PSP runways with extensive taxiway and hardstand parking areas. Steel control tower. Opened February 1944. Airfield in operation until end of war, closing in August 1945. Abandoned and land returned to agricultural use, Naples-Canosa Autostrada (A16) bisects former airfield. Moderate scarring of land still visible from former airfield use visible on aerial photography.

- 461st Bombardment Group, (B-24 Liberator), 20 February 1944 – July 1945
- 484th Bombardment Group, (B-24 Liberator), April 1944 – 25 May 1945

=== Tortorella Airfield ===
Abandoned, was located 9.4 Kilometers east-northeast of Foggia, 41°29′07″N 015°39′5″E

- 99th Bombardment Group USAAF, (B-17 Flying Fortress), 11 December 1943 – October 1945
- 231 Wing RAF (37 and 70 Squadrons) (Wellington Mk.X, Consolidated Liberator), December 1943 – October 1945

=== Triolo Airfield ===
Abandoned, was located approximately 8 km (5.0 mi) southeast of San Severo, 41°37′30″N 015°27′30″E

Captured Regia Aeronautica airfield used by Twelfth Air Force fighter units. Repaired by COE in September 1943 and put into use immediately. In operational use until August 1945 when USAAF turned over the facility to Allied Italian Co-Belligerent Air Force (Aviazione Cobelligerante Italiana, or ACI). Dismantled after the war and today is agricultural/light industrial area with antenna farm erected on former airfield site. Possible some former airfield structures and concreted areas still in use by instrial area. Slight scarring of land under former main runway visible in aerial photography.

- 14th Fighter Group, (P-38 Lightning), 12 September 1943 – 9 September 1945
- 31st Fighter Group, (P-51 Mustang), 15 July – August 1945

=== Venosa Airfield ===
Abandoned, was located approximately 6 km (3.7 mi) east-northeast of Venosa, 40°59′49.30″N 015°52′25″E

Semi-permanent heavy bomber airfield used by Fifteenth Air Force. Built by COE beginning in September 1943. One PSP runway with extensive taxiway and hardstand parking areas. Wooden control tower. Opened 14 March 1944. Last combat operations flown in late April 1945. Closed on 4 July 1945. Today is agricultural area with no structures or any facilities in existence, however extensive evidence of land scarring still is visible in aerial photography.

- 485th Bombardment Group, (B-24 Liberator), April 1944 – 15 May 1945

=== Vincenzo Airfield ===
Abandoned, was located between Foggia and Troia, 41°24′40″N 15°25′28″E. Vincenzo airfield is also known as Santa Giusta.

Temporary airfield used by Twelfth and Fifteenth Air Force fighter and light/medium bombardment units. Built by COE in late September 1943; last combat operations flown in February 1945; used by 542d Air Service Group until October 1945 when closed. Today is agricultural area with little or no evidence of its existence.

- 1st Fighter Group, (P-38 Lightning), 8 January – 21 February 1945
- 47th Bombardment Group, (A-20 Havoc), 15 October 1943 – 10 January 1944
- 82d Fighter Group, (P-38 Lightning), 11 January – 30 August 1944
- 321st Bombardment Group, (B-25 Mitchell), 14 January – February 1944
- 325th Fighter Group, (P-51 Mustang), July – 9 October 1945

=== Vis Airfield ===
Abandoned, 43°2′0″N 16°12′00″E

Correction

Vis was in Yugoslavia, not southeast Italy.
