= 2nd Fighter Training Squadron =

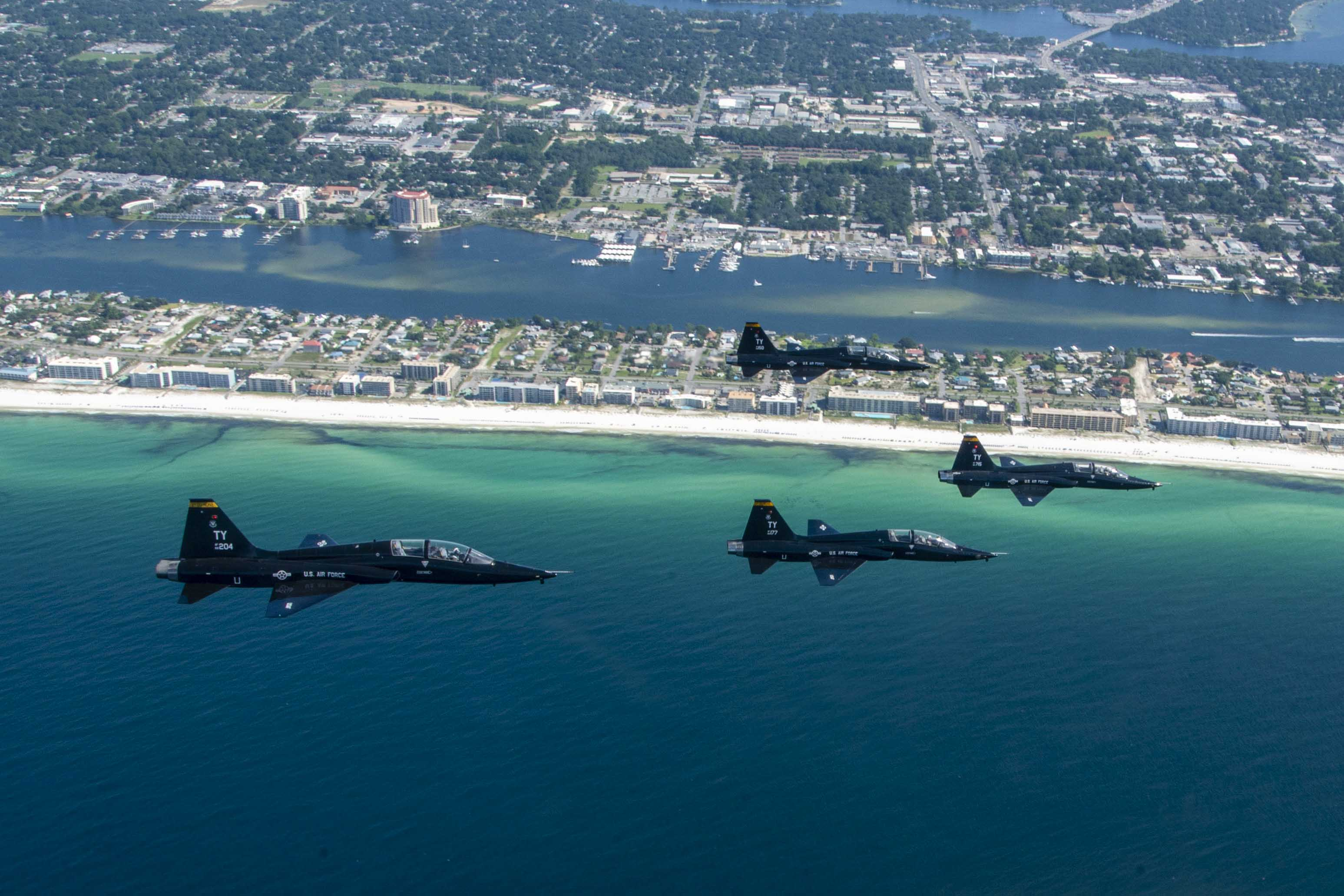
- T-38A Talons from the 2nd Fighter Training Squadron
- Active: 1941–1945; 1946–1969; 1971–1973; 1974–2010; 2014–present
- Country: United States
- Branch: United States Air Force
- Type: Squadron
- Nickname: American Beagles
- Motto: Second to None
- Engagements: World War II EAME Theatre

- Decorations: Distinguished Unit Citation (2x); Air Force Outstanding Unit Award (4x)

Insignia
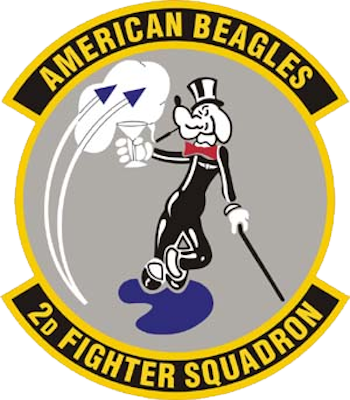
- 2nd Fighter Squadron emblem (Approved 7 October 1999) (Note: Modified 29 July 2005. Bailey, AFHRA Factsheet, 2d Fighter Squadron.)

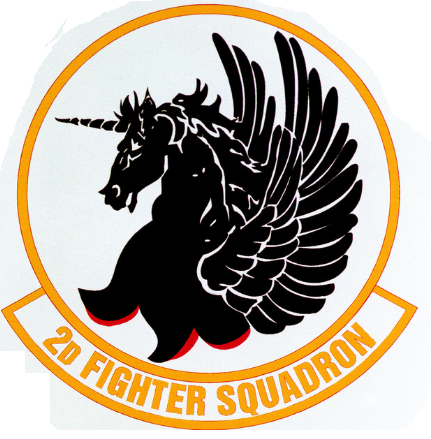
- 2nd Fighter-Interceptor Squadron emblem (emblem approved 11 January 1951, motto added 5 March 1959)
- Squadron Fuselage Code (1942–1945): QP

The 2nd Fighter Training Squadron, sometimes written as 2d Fighter Training Squadron, is an active United States Air Force unit, assigned to the 325th Operations Group at Tyndall Air Force Base, Florida.

Originally constituted in 1940 as the 2nd Pursuit Squadron, over the course of time the unit has been variously designated as, amongst others, the 2nd Fighter All-Weather Squadron, the 2nd Fighter-Interceptor Squadron, the 2nd Fighter Weapons Squadron, the 2nd Tactical Fighter Training Squadron, and the 2nd Fighter Squadron. It was redesignated the 2nd Fighter Training Squadron in 2014 and reactivated the same year. The squadron operates the Northrop T-38 Talon aircraft conducting adversary training for F-22 Raptor pilots in air superiority missions.

== History ==
=== World War II ===
Originally constituted as the 2d Pursuit Squadron on 20 November 1940, the squadron was activated on 15 January 1941. It served in World War II with the 52d Pursuit Group, and during that period flew the Curtis P-40 Warhawk and Bell P-39 Airacobra. The 2d also flew combat missions in the Supermarine Spitfire and North American P-51 Mustang in the European and Mediterranean Theaters, serving specifically in air campaigns in Europe, Algeria, French Morocco, Tunisia, Sicily, Naples-Foggia, Rome-Arno, Normandy, Northern France, Southern France, north Apennines, Rhineland, Central Europe, Po Valley, and performed air combat. The unit received two Distinguished Unit Citations for operations in Germany and Romania in 1944. Following World War II, the squadron was inactivated on 7 November 1945 at Drew Field, Florida.

=== United States Air Force ===
==== Air Defense Command ====
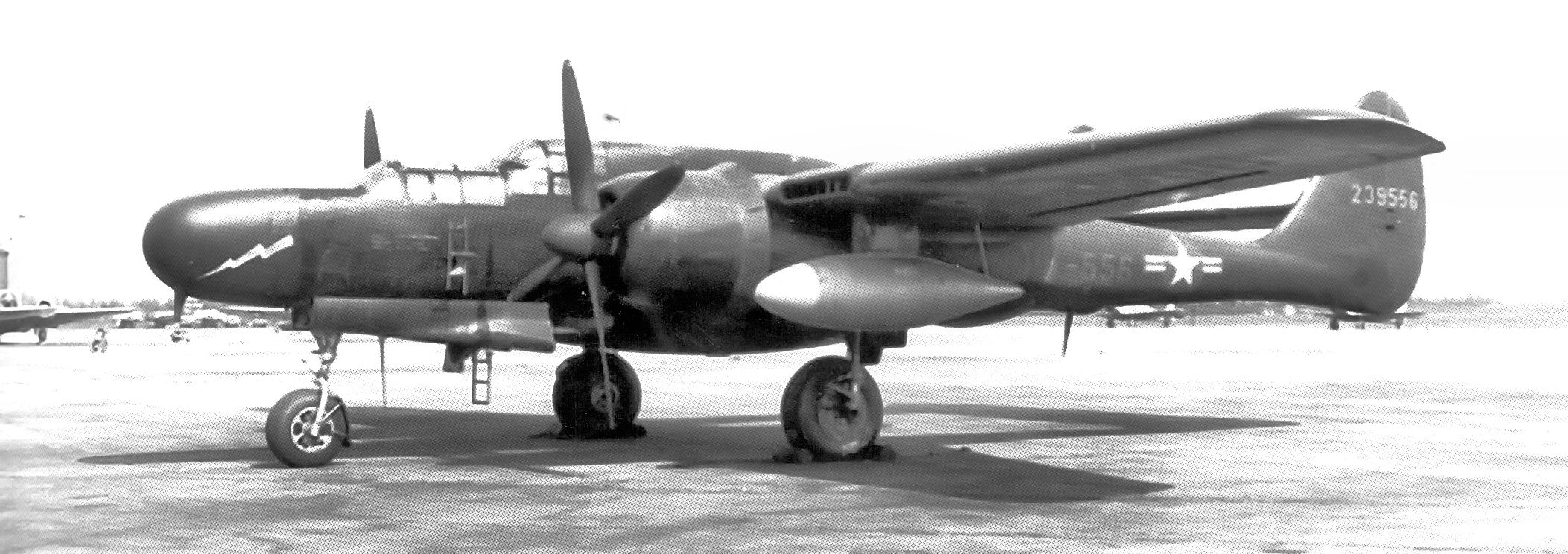
2d Fighter Squadron P-61B Black Widow at Mitchel AFB (Note: Aircraft is Northrop P-61B-10-NO serial 42-39556 taken upon delivery from depot refurbishing at Tinker AFB, Oklahoma)

It was reactivated on 9 November 1946 and was assigned to the 52d Fighter Group under which it served tours in Schweinfurt Air Base and Bad Kissingen, Germany. Returning to Mitchell Field, New York, the squadron was designated the 2d Fighter Squadron and flew the Northrop P-61 Black Widow. In 1949, the 2d was moved to McGuire Air Force Base, New Jersey, where it began flying the North American F-82 Twin Mustang.

In 1950, the 2 FS became the 2d Fighter All Weather Squadron and was outfitted with the Lockheed F-94 Starfire. One year later the unit was redesignated the 2d Fighter-Interceptor Squadron and began flying the Republic F-84 Thunderjet.

In 1952 the 2nd was reassigned first to the 4709th Defense Wing, then, a year later, to the 568th Air Defense Group. The same year, the squadron was equipped with North American F-86A Sabre day fighters. Re-equipped in 1954 with North American F-86D Sabres. Reassignment back to the 52d Fighter Group took place in August 1955, and the squadron moved its operations to Suffolk County Air Force Base, New York in 1957, the first delta wing fighter, the Convair F-102 Delta Dagger, was assigned to the unit to be replaced in 1959 with the McDonnell F-101 Voodoo. The squadron flew the F-101 for 10 years before being inactivated in 1969.

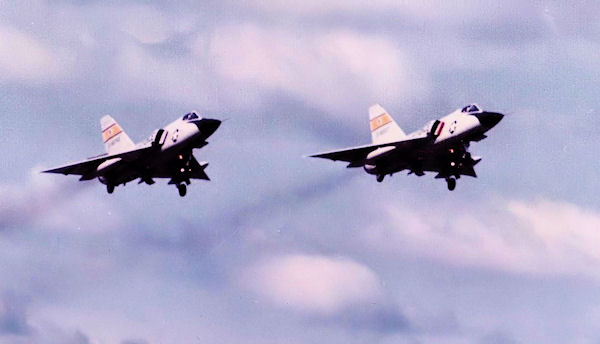
2 F-106s taking off, Wurtsmith AFB

In 1971, the squadron was reactivated under the 23d Air Division at Wurtsmith Air Force Base, Michigan, flying the supersonic all weather Convair F-106 Delta Darts formerly assigned to the 94th Fighter-Interceptor Squadron. The unit received the Air Force Outstanding Unit Award for its activities during 1971–1972 at Wurtsmith, but was inactivated 31 March 1973.

==== Air Defense Training ====
In August 1974, the squadron was reactivated and designated the 2d Fighter-Interceptor Training Squadron and was activated at the Air Defense Weapons Center located at Tyndall Air Force Base, Florida, where it continued to fly the F-106.

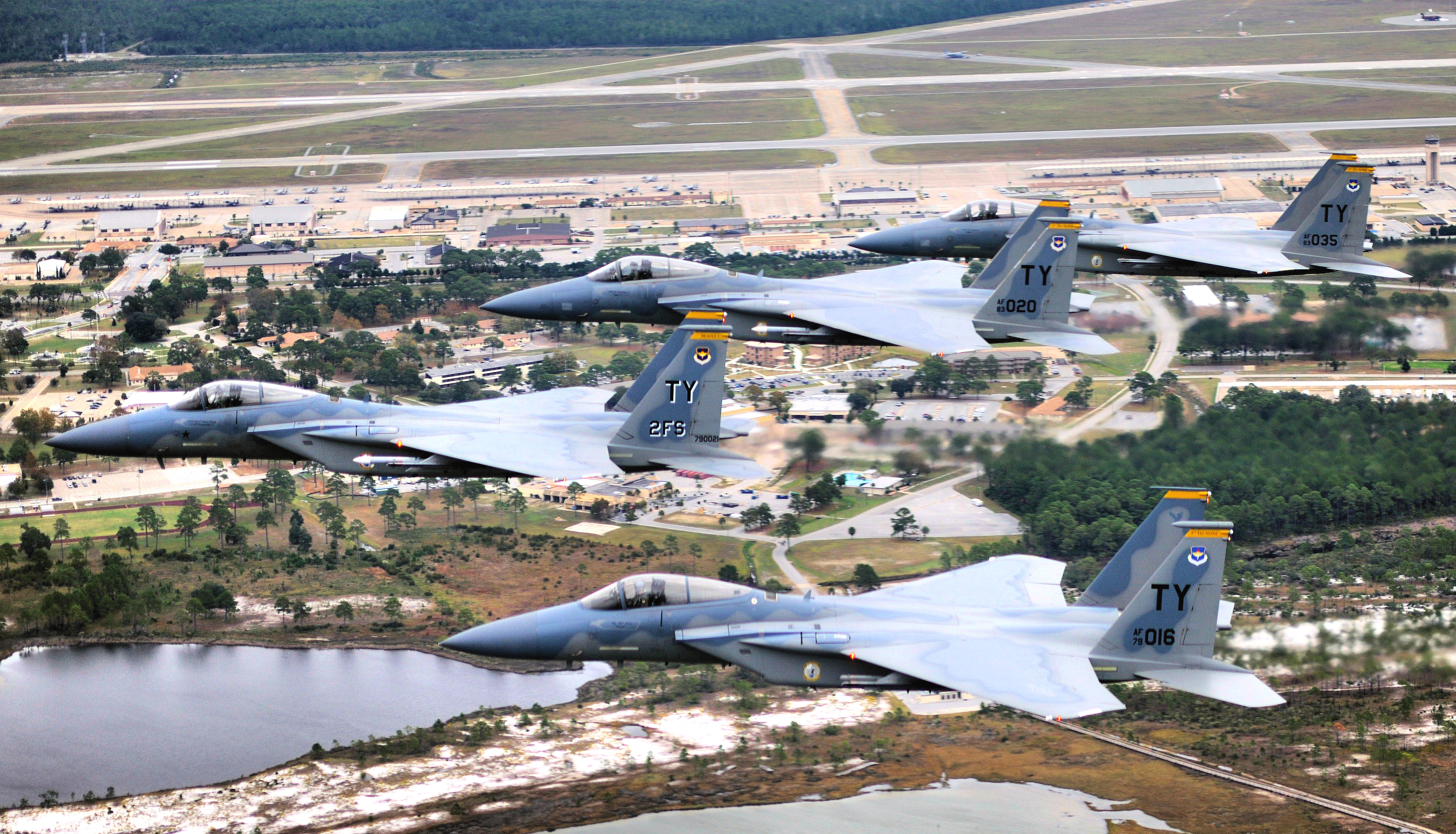
F-15s from the 2nd Fighter Squadron over Tyndall Air Force Base, 2010

On 1 February 1982, the unit was redesignated the 2d Fighter Weapons Squadron, and it had the privilege of training the last active duty F-106 pilots. The unit received another Air Force Outstanding Unit Award for its activities during 1981–1982 at Tyndall. In May 1984 the squadron was redesignated as the 2d Tactical Fighter Training Squadron, and transitioned to the McDonnell Douglas F-15 Eagle where it continued to train pilots for integration into Combat Air Forces worldwide, and maintained the capability to provide augmentation to air defense forces until its inactivation in September 2010.

The name was changed to the 2d Fighter Squadron on 1 November 1991. It received another Air Force Outstanding Unit Award for its activities between 1999 and 2000.

The squadron was reactivated as the 2d Fighter Training Squadron on 22 August 2014 to operate Northrop T-38 Talons conducting adversary training for F-22 Raptor pilots flying air superiority missions. The growth of the T-38 adversary program at Tyndall led to the activation of a separate squadron to operate it.

== Lineage ==
- Constituted as the 2d Pursuit Squadron (Interceptor) on 20 November 1940

Activated on 15 January 1941
Redesignated 2d Fighter Squadron on 15 May 1942
Redesignated 2d Fighter Squadron, Single Engine on 20 August 1944
Inactivated on 7 November 1945
Redesignated 2d Fighter Squadron (All Weather) on 18 October 1946

- Activated on 9 November 1946

Redesignated 2d Fighter Squadron, All Weather on 10 May 1948
Redesignated 2d Fighter-All Weather Squadron on 20 January 1950
Redesignated 2d Fighter-Interceptor Squadron on 1 May 1951
Inactivated on 31 December 1969

- Activated on 1 July 1971

Inactivated on 31 March 1973
Redesignated 2d Fighter-Interceptor Training Squadron on 15 August 1974

- Activated on 1 September 1974

Redesignated 2d Fighter Weapons Squadron on 1 February 1982
Redesignated 2d Tactical Fighter Training Squadron on 1 May 1984
Redesignated 2d Fighter Squadron on 1 November 1991
Inactivated on 30 September 2010
Redesignated 2d Fighter Training Squadron on 9 July 2014
Activated on 22 August 2014

=== Assignments ===
- 52d Pursuit Group (later 52d Fighter Group): 15 January 1941 – 7 November 1945
- 52d Fighter Group (later 52d Fighter-All Weather Group, 52d Fighter-Interceptor Group): 9 November 1946
- 4709th Defense Wing: 6 February 1952
- 568th Air Defense Group: 16 February 1953
- 4709th Defense Wing (later 4709th Air Defense Wing): 8 July 1954
- 52d Fighter Group: 18 August 1955
- 52d Fighter Wing: 1 July 1963
- 52d Fighter Group: 30 September 1968 – 31 December 1969
- 23d Air Division: 1 July 1971 – 31 March 1973
- Air Defense Weapons Center (later USAF Air Defense Weapons Center): 1 September 1974
- 325th Fighter Weapons Wing (later 325th Tactical Training Wing): 1 July 1981
- 325th Operations Group: 1 September 1991 – 30 September 2010
- 325th Operations Group: 22 August 2014 – present

=== Stations ===
- Selfridge Field, Michigan, 15 January 1941
- Norfolk, Virginia, 17 December 1941
- Selfridge Field, Michigan, 14 January 1942
- Florence, South Carolina, 18 February 1942
- Bluethenthal Field, North Carolina, 27 April 1942
- Grenier Field, New Hampshire, 14 June – 19 July 1942
- RAF Eglinton (Station 344), Northern Ireland, 19 August 1942
- RAF Goxhill (Station 345), England, 26 August – 27 October 1942 (air echelon at RAF Biggin Hill until 13 September 1942)
- La Senia Airfield, Algeria, 13 November 1942 (air echelon dispersed at Maison Blanche Airport, Algeria, 24 November – 4 December 1942 and Bone Airfield, Algeria after 28 November 1942)
- Orleansville Airfield, Algeria, 30 December 1942 (air echelon dispersed at Bone Airfield, Algeria until 11 January 1943 and at Biskra Airfield, Algeria after 4 January 1943)
- Relizane Airfield, Algeria, 15 January 1943 (air echelon at Biskra Airfield, Algeria )
- Biskra Airfield, Algeria, 20 January 1943
- Chateau-dun-du-Rhumel Airfield, Algeria, 16 February 1943 (air echelon at Thelepte Airfield No. 1, Tunisia, 15–17 February 1943, Youks-les-Bains Airfield, Algeria, until 20 February 1943, Canrobert Airfield, Algeria, 20 February 1943)
- Ain M'lila Airfield, Algeria, 23 February 1943
- Youks-les-Bains Airfield, Algeria, 8 March 1943 (air echelon at Thelepte Airfield No. 2, Tunisia, 10 March – 6 April 1943, Sbeitla Airfield, Tunisia, until 14 April 1943, Gidem (Le Sers Airfield No. 3), Tunisia, until 20 April 1943)
- Le Sers Airfield, Tunisia, 20 April 1943
- La Sebala Airfield, Tunisia, 22 May 1943 (air echelon at Le Sers No. 3, Tunisia, until 23 May 1943, Bocca di Falco Airport, Sicily, Italy after 29 July 1943))
- Bocca di Falco Airport, Sicily, Italy, 6 August 1943
- Borgo Airfield, Corsica, France, 3 December 1943
- Aghione Airfield Airfield, Corsica, France, 27 April 1944
- Madna Airfield, Italy, 16 May 1944 ((air echelon at Pyriatyn, Soviet Union, 4–6 July 1944)
- Piagiolino Airfield, Italy, 21 April 1945
- Lesina Airfield Airfield, Italy, c. 10 July 1945 – 13 August 1945
- Drew Field, Florida, 25 August – 7 November 1945
- Schweinfurt Air Base, Germany, 9 November 1946
- Bad Kissingen, Germany, 5 May 1947
- Mitchel Air Force Base, New York, 25 June 1947
- McGuire Air Force Base, New Jersey, 4 October 1949
- Suffolk County Air Force Base, New York, 18 August 1955 – 31 December 1969
- Wurtsmith Air Force Base, Michigan1, 1 July 1971 – 31 March 1973
- Tyndall Air Force Base, Florida, 1 September 1974 – 30 September 2010
- Tyndall Air Force Base, Florida, 22 August 2014 – present

=== Aircraft ===
- Curtiss P-40 Warhawk (1941–1942)
- Bell P-39 Airacobra (1942)
- Supermarine Spitfire (1942–1944)
- North American P-51 Mustang (1944–1945)
- Douglas A-26 Invader (1946–1947)
- Northrop P-61 Black Widow (1947–1948)
- North American F-82 Twin Mustang (1948–1949)
- North American F-86A Sabre (1949–1950)
- Lockheed F-94A Starfire (1950–1953)
- Republic F-84G Thunderjet (1953)
- North American F-86D Sabre (1953–1957)
- Convair F-102A Delta Dagger (1957–1959)
- McDonnell F-101B Voodoo (1959–1969, 1974–1981)
- Convair F-106 Delta Dart (1971–1973, 1974–1984)
- McDonnell Douglas F-15 Eagle (1984–2010)
- Northrop T-38 Talon (2014–present)

== See also ==
- List of United States Air Force squadrons
- Aerospace Defense Command Fighter Squadrons
- List of F-86 Sabre units
- F-94 Starfire units of the United States Air Force
- List of F-106 Delta Dart units of the United States Air Force
- List of F-15 operators
