= 4th Fighter Squadron =

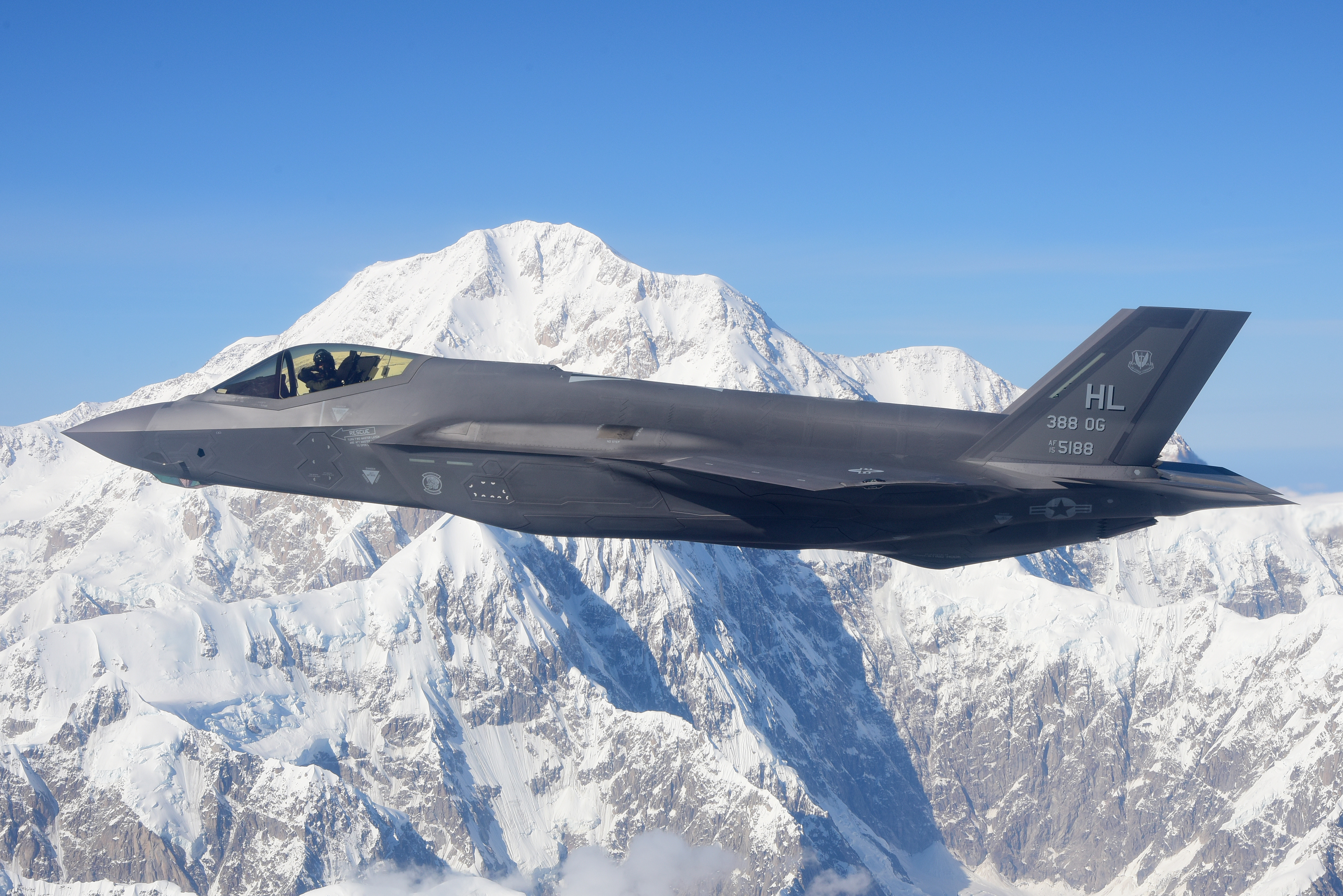
- Squadron F-35 Lightning II
- Active: 1941–1945; 1946–1969; 1971–1973; 1974–present
- Country: United States
- Branch: United States Air Force
- Type: Squadron
- Role: Fighter
- Part of: Air Combat Command
- Garrison/HQ: Hill Air Force Base, Utah
- Nickname(s): Fightin' Fuujins
- Mascot(s): Fuujin
- Engagements: World War II Mediterranean Theater of Operations; Korean War; Vietnam War; 1991 Gulf War (Defense of Saudi Arabia; Liberation of Kuwait)

- Decorations: Distinguished Unit Citation (2x); Presidential Unit Citation (2x); Air Force Outstanding Unit Award with Combat "V" Device (4x); Air Force Outstanding Unit Award (2x); Republic of Vietnam Gallantry Cross with Palm

Insignia
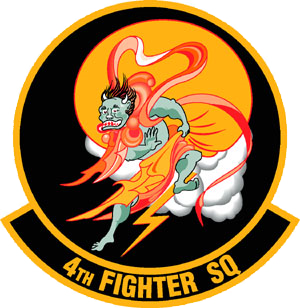
- 4th Fighter Squadron emblem (modified 1994)

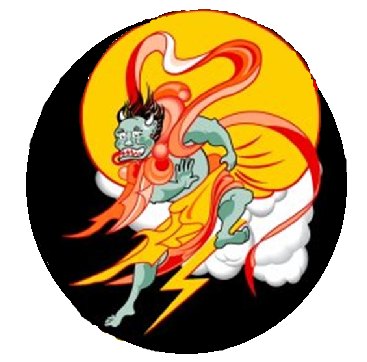
- 4th Fighter Squadron emblem (approved 25 February 1949)

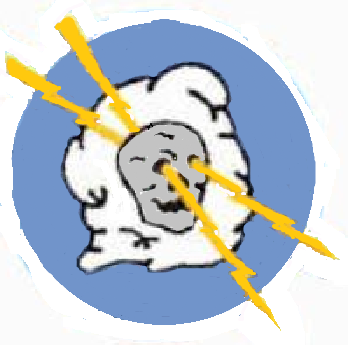
- 4th Fighter Squadron emblem (World War II)

The 4th Fighter Squadron, "Fighting Fuujins" is part of the 388th Fighter Wing at Hill Air Force Base, Utah. It operates the Lockheed Martin F-35 Lightning II aircraft, which replaced the unit's General Dynamics F-16 Fighting Falcons in August 2017. The 4th FS primarily conducts air superiority, strike, and close air support missions.

The squadron was first activated in 1941 as the United States Army Air Corps expanded prior to the entry of the U.S. into World War II. The squadron served in the Mediterranean Theater of Operations, where it earned two Distinguished Unit Citations. The squadron was reactivated in Okinawa as an all-weather fighter squadron in 1947. It served in the air defense of Japan until 1965 as the 4th Fighter-Interceptor Squadron, deploying to fly combat sorties during the Korean War.

The squadron returned to the United States in 1965, and reformed as the 4th Tactical Fighter Squadron. In 1969, it moved to Thailand, where it flew missions during the Vietnam War. After the war, the squadron moved to its current base at Hill. It again entered combat when it deployed as part of a provisional fighter wing during Operation Desert Storm. In 2019, the unit completed the first operational combat deployment of the F-35A, in support of Operation Inherent Resolve and Operation Freedom's Sentinel

== Mission ==
Conduct air-to-air and air-to-ground operations for daylight and nighttime missions.

== History ==
=== World War II ===
The 4th was activated as the 4th Pursuit Squadron at Selfridge Field, Michigan on 15 January 1941 as one of the original three squadrons of the 52d Pursuit Group and trained under Third Air Force as a tactical fighter squadron. Moved to several U.S. bases before relocating to Northern Ireland and England in 1942. Equipped with the British Supermarine Spitfire, was assigned to Twelfth Air Force during the North African Campaign in late 1942. Moved across Algeria and Tunisia flying ground support missions for American ground forces; taking part in the invasion of Sicily and Italy in 1943. Participated in the liberation of Corsica in 1943; then returning to Italy and being re-equipped with North American P-51D Mustangs in May 1944. Participated in Northern Italian Campaign, returning to the United States in August 1945 and inactivating.

=== Far East Air Force and Korean War ===
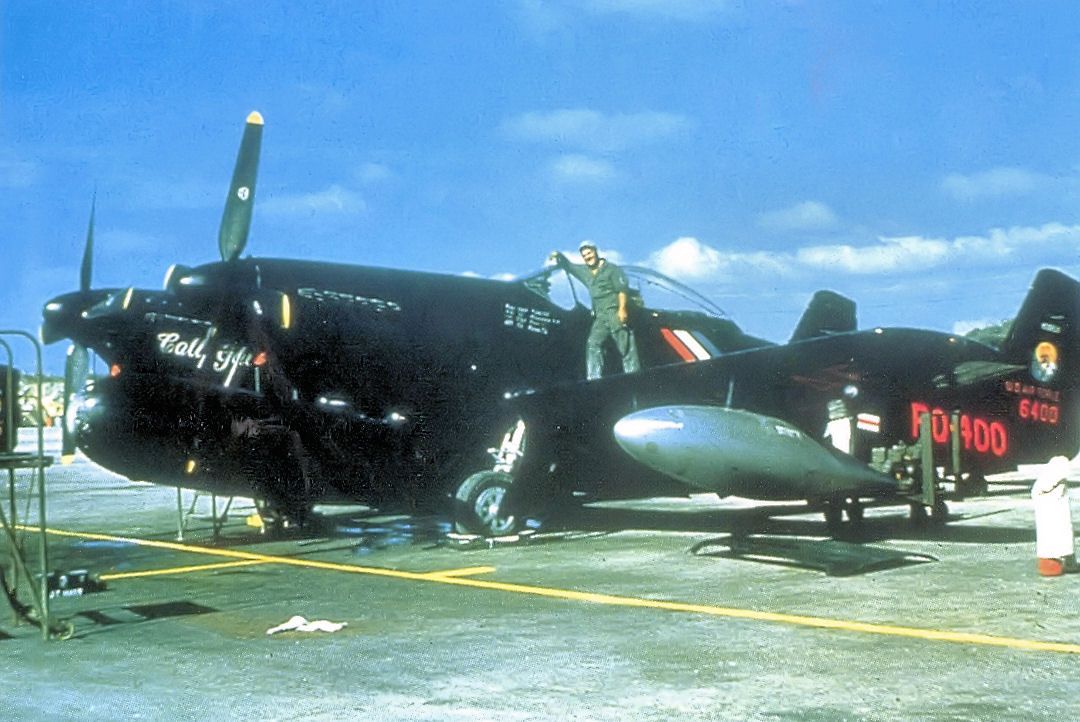
Squadron P-82G Twin Mustang (Note: Aircraft is North American P-82G-NA Twin Mustang, serial 46–400, "Call Girl". Taken in 1950 at Naha Air Base, Okinawa.)

Reactivated as part of Twentieth Air Force in Okinawa, assuming personnel and Northrop P-61 Black Widows of the inactivated 418th Night Fighter Squadron. Performed air defense role over Okinawa during Chinese Civil War on the mainland during 1947–1950. Re-equipped with new F-82G Twin Mustangs in 1949, retiring war-weary F-61s in early 1950. Deployed flight of F-82s to Japan in June 1950 as part of Far East Air Force mobility upon breakout of Korean War.

A flight of 8 aircraft assigned to 347th Provisional Fighter Group (All-Weather), 27 June – 5 July 1950 for combat missions in Korea Engaged in combat operations over South Korea during 1950, until F-51D Mustangs and Republic F-84 Thunderjets arrived in +the Korean theater. Then few combat missions from Japan, rotating flights of North American F-82 Twin Mustangs from Okinawa during 1950–1951, largely performing long-range weather reconnaissance flights over North Korea. Began receiving Lockheed F-94C Starfire jet interceptors to replace F-82s in 1951, retiring the last of its Twin Mustangs in late 1951. Continued air defense mission of Okinawa until 1954; moving to Japan and taking over interceptor mission until 1954 flying first North American F-86D Sabres then Convair F-102A Delta Daggers. Also train pilots of the Japanese Self-Defense Forces, the Republic of Korea Air Force and the Royal Thai Air Force, and flew combat missions over Korea and Vietnam.

=== Vietnam War ===
In June 1965, the 4th moved to Eglin Air Force Base, Florida, and was renamed the 4th Tactical Fighter Squadron, under the aegis of the 33d Tactical Fighter Wing, becoming the fourth Air Force fighter squadron trained in the McDonnell F-4C Phantom IIs. Deployed in July 1967, to Ubon Royal Thai Air Force Base, Thailand, where they were designated as the 435th Tactical Fighter Squadron and immediately began combat operations. It moved in 1969 to Da Nang Air Base, Republic of Vietnam; flying tactical bombing missions over North Vietnam as part of the 366th Tactical Fighter Wing. Remained in Vietnam until United States redeployment from Da Nang in mid-1972. The squadron attained the U.S. Air Force's last Southeast Asia aerial victory, downing a MiG-21 on 8 January 1973. In all the 4th downed four enemy aircraft in combat over Vietnam.

For the next two years, the squadron remained at Udorn Royal Thai Air Force Base, flying cover for evacuations of Phnom Penh, Cambodia and Saigon, Republic of Vietnam. The 4th performed strike missions in support of a recovery operation for the SS Mayaguez, a merchant freighter captured by Cambodian Khmer Rouge guerillas in May 1975.

=== 388th Fighter Wing ===
In December 1975, the 4th moved to Hill Air Force Base, Utah, and formed the initial cadre of the relocation of the 388th Tactical Fighter Wing flying the F-4D Phantom IIs.

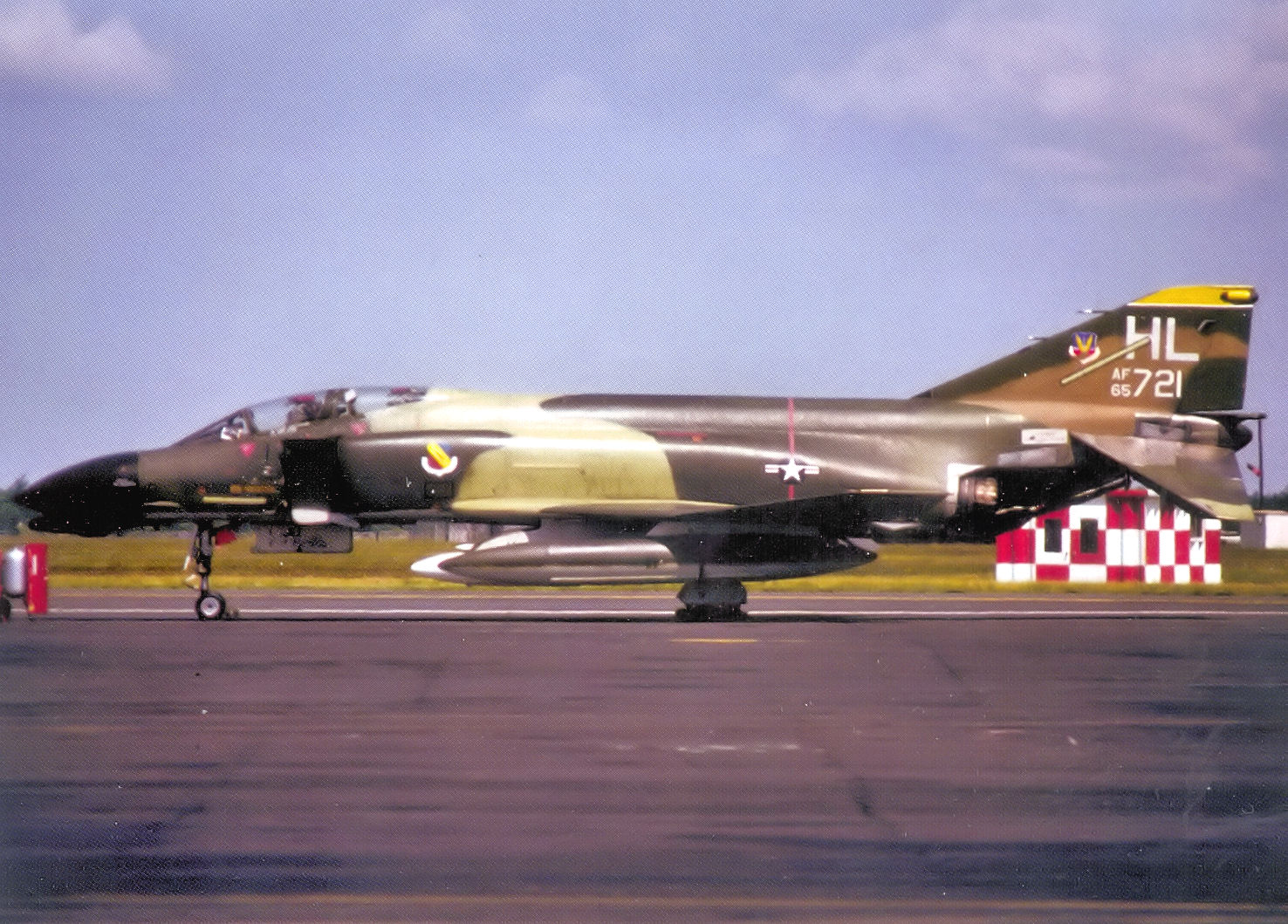
Squadron McDonnell F-4 Phantom II (Note: Aircraft is McDonnell F-4D-28-MC Phantom II, serial 65-721, taken about 1978.)

In March 1980, the squadron began conversion to the General Dynamics F-16 Fighting Falcon as the Air Force's first operational F-16 tactical fighter squadron. The squadron upgraded to the F-16C Block 40 in January 1990.

When Iraq invaded Kuwait in August 1990, the 4th found deployed to Southwest Asia in support of Operation Desert Shield. Their deployment took 16 hours non-stop with 10 air refuelings (five at night). This set a record as the longest distance flown non-stop in the F-16. The squadron dropped more than 2,000 tons of conventional munitions on strategic and tactical targets in Iraq and Kuwait during more than 1,000 daytime combat sorties while only two of their aircraft were damaged by enemy fire and none lost in combat.

==== 2013 Sequestration ====
Air Combat Command officials announced a stand down and reallocation of flying hours for the rest of the fiscal year 2013 due to mandatory budget cuts. The across-the board spending cuts, called sequestration, took effect 1 March when Congress failed to agree on a deficit-reduction plan.

Squadrons either stood down on a rotating basis or kept combat ready or at a reduced readiness level called "basic mission capable" for part or all of the remaining months in fiscal 2013. This affected the 4th Fighter Squadron with a reduction of its flying hours, grounding all assigned pilots from 5 April-30 September 2013.

During late 2017 the unit changed to the Lockheed Martin F-35 Lightning II.

== Lineage ==
- Constituted as the 4th Pursuit Squadron (Interceptor)' on 20 November 1940

Activated on 15 January 1941
Redesignated 4th Fighter Squadron on 15 May 1942
Redesignated 4th Fighter Squadron, Single Engine on 20 August 1943
Inactivated on 7 November 1945

- Redesignated 4th Fighter Squadron (All Weather) on 19 December 1946

Activated on 20 February 1947
Redesignated 4th Fighter Squadron, All Weather on 10 August 1948
Redesignated 4th Fighter-All Weather Squadron on 20 January 1950
Redesignated 4th Fighter-Interceptor Squadron on 25 April 1951
Redesignated 4th Tactical Fighter Squadron on 20 June 1965
Redesignated 4th Fighter Squadron on 1 November 1991

=== Assignments ===
- 52d Pursuit Group (later 52d Fighter Group), 15 January 1941 – 7 November 1945
- 347th Fighter Group, 20 February 1947 (attached to 51st Fighter Group (later 51st Fighter-Interceptor] Group)
- Twentieth Air Force, 24 June 1950 (attached to 6302d Air Base Group, 20 September 1950, 6351st Air Base Wing, 25 June 1951-unknown)
- Japan Air Defense Force, 10 August 1954 (attached to 39th Air Division)
- Fifth Air Force, 1 September 1954 (attached to 39th Air Division)
- 39th Air Division, 1 March 1955
- 33d Tactical Fighter Wing, 20 June 1965
- 366th Tactical Fighter Wing, 12 April 1969
- 432d Tactical Reconnaissance Wing (later 432d Tactical Fighter Wing), 31 October 1972
- 388th Tactical Fighter Wing (later 388th Fighter Wing), 23 December 1975 (attached to 388th Tactical Fighter Wing (Deployed) (later, 388th Tactical Fighter Wing (Provisional)), 28 August 1990 – 27 March 1991)
- 388th Operations Group, 1 December 1991 – present

=== Stations ===
- Selfridge Field, Michigan, 15 January 1941
- Langley Field, Virginia, 17 December 1941
- Selfridge Field, Michigan, 14 January 1942
- Florence Army Air Field, South Carolina, 8 February 1942
- Bluethenthal Field, North Carolina, 27 April 1942
- Grenier Field, New Hampshire, 12 June – 19 July 1942
- RAF Eglinton, Northern Ireland, 19 August 1942
- RAF Goxhill, England, 25 August – 29 October 1942

Air echelon arrived at Oran Tafraoui Airport, Algeria, on 8 November 1942

- La Senia Airfield, Algeria, 12 November 1942
- Orleansville Airfield, Algeria, 1 January 1943
- Telergma Airfield, Algeria, 19 January 1943
- Youks-les-Bains Airfield, Algeria, 8 March 1943
- Le Sers Airfield, Tunisia, 12 April 1943
- La Sebala Airfield, Tunisia, 20 May 1943
- Bocca di Falco Airfield, Sicily, Italy, 1 August 1943
- Aghione Airfield, Corsica, France, 4 December 1943
- Madna Airfield, Italy, c. 14 May 1944
- Piagiolino Airfield, Italy, c. 24 April 1945
- Lesina Airfield, Italy, 10 July–August 1945
- Drew Field, Florida, 25 August – 7 November 1945
- Yontan Airfield, Okinawa, 20 February 1947
- Naha Air Base, Okinawa, 19 August 1948
- Kadena Air Base, Okinawa, 16 February 1953
- Naha Air Base, Okinawa, 25 February 1954
- Misawa Air Base, Japan, 1 August 1954 – 15 June 1965;
- Eglin Air Force Base, Florida, 20 June 1965 – 9 April 1969
- Da Nang Air Base, South Vietnam, 12 April 1969
- Takhli Royal Thai Air Force Base, Thailand, 27 June 1972
- Udorn Royal Thai Air Force Base, Thailand, 31 October 1972 – 23 December 1975
- Hill Air Force Base, Utah, 23 December 1975–present

Deployed to: Al Minhad Air Base, United Arab Emirates (28 August 1990 – 27 March 1991)

=== Aircraft ===
- Curtiss P-40 Warhawk (1941–1942)
- Bell P-39 Airacobra (1941–1942)
- Supermarine Spitfire (1942–1944)
- North American P-51 Mustang (1944–1945)
- Northrop P-61 Black Widow (1947–1950)
- North American F-82 Twin Mustang (1949–1950)
- Lockheed F-94 Starfire (1951–1954)
- North American F-86D Sabre (1954–1960)
- Convair F-102 Delta Dagger (1960–1965)
- McDonnell F-4 Phantom II (1965–1967, 1967–1975, 1976–1980)
- General Dynamics F-16 Fighting Falcon (1980–2017)
- F-35A Lightning II (2017–present)
