= 5th Flying Training Squadron =

5th Flying Training Squadron

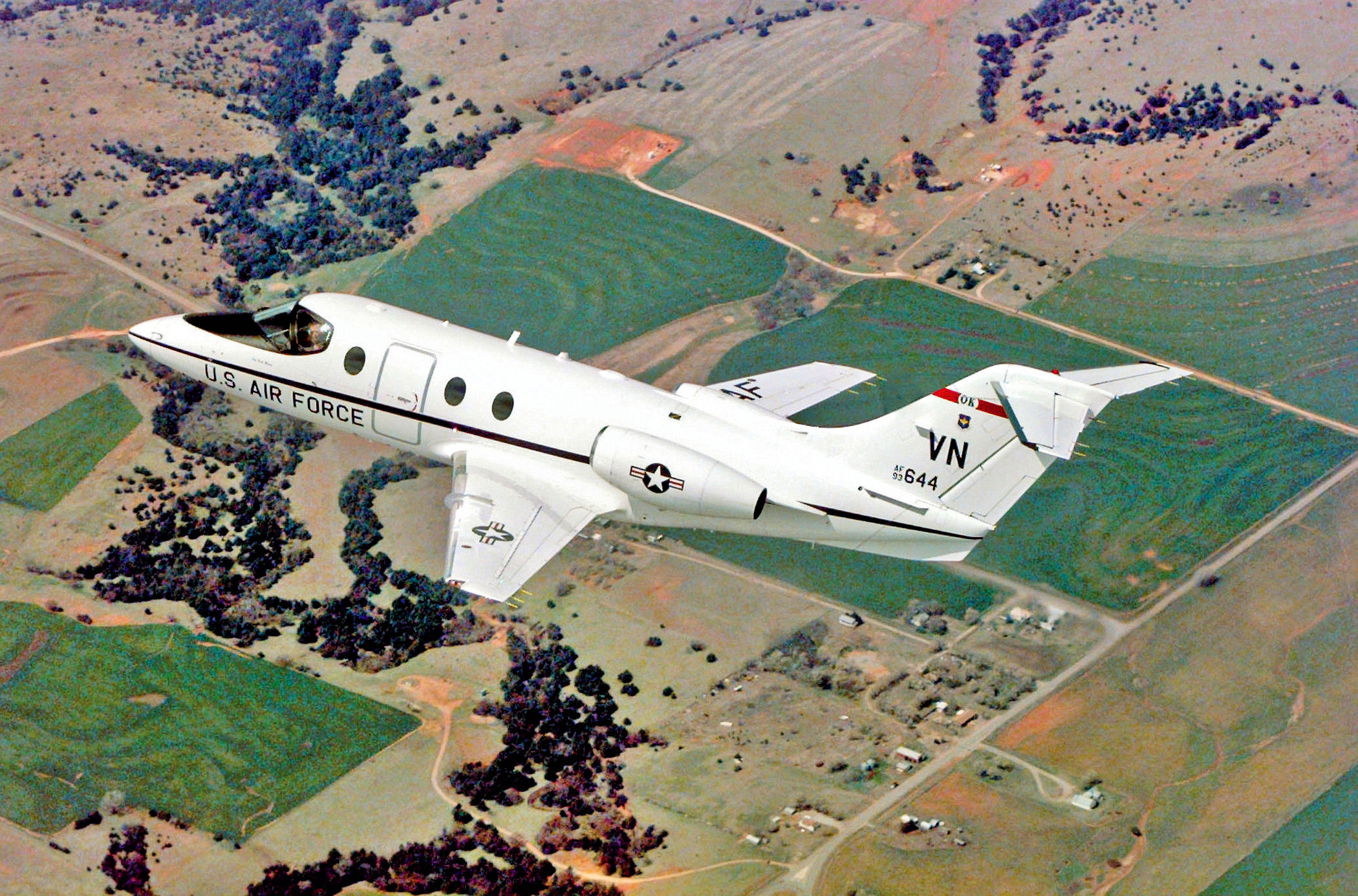
- 5th Flying Training Squadron T-1 Jayhawk
- Active: 1941–1945; 1946–1988; 1990–1991; 1997–present
- Country: United States
- Branch: United States Air Force
- Role: Pilot Training
- Part of: Air Force Reserve Command
- Garrison/HQ: Vance Air Force Base, Oklahoma
- Nickname: Spittin' Kittens
- Motto: Isti Non Penetrabunt Latin They Shall not Penetrate (Note: As an ADC squadron, the squadron's motto was Isti Non Penetrabunt, literally "they shall not penetrate", but colloquially to crews as The Bastards Shall Not Pass Broughton 2007, p. 274)
- Engagements: World War II EAME Theatre

- Decorations: Distinguished Unit Citation (2×); Air Force Outstanding Unit Award (5×)

Commanders
- Notable commanders: Jacksel M. Broughton

Insignia
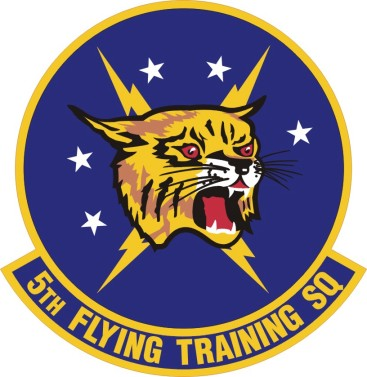
- 5th Flying Training Squadron emblem (Note: The emblem was modified after 1963 to bring the lightning bolts within the disc. Maurer, p. 34)

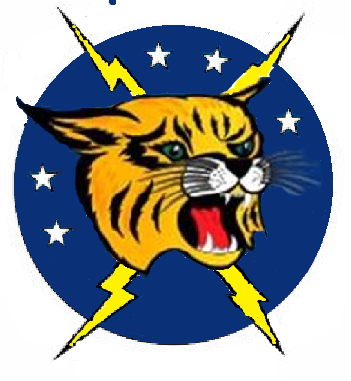
- 5th Fighter-All Weather Sq emblem (approved 16 January 1951)

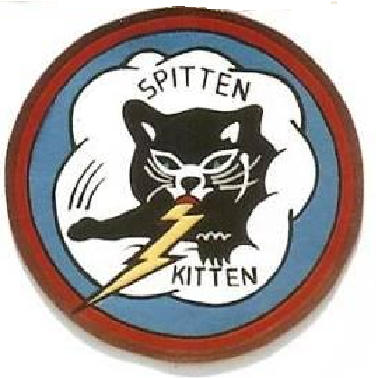
- 5th Fighter Squadron emblem (World War II)

The 5th Flying Training Squadron is part of the United States Air Force's Air Force Reserve Command serving as a reserve associate squadron operating with the 71st Flying Training Wing at Vance Air Force Base, Oklahoma. It operates the Raytheon T-1 Jayhawk, Northrop T-38C Talon, and Beechcraft T-6A Texan II aircraft conducting flight training in support of the 71st Operations Group.

== History ==
=== World War II ===
The squadron was established at Selfridge Field, Michigan as the 5th Pursuit Squadron an Army Air Corps fighter squadron in January 1941. It was assigned to the Northeast Air District with Curtiss P-40 Warhawks and Bell P-39 Airacobras as part of the defense buildup prior to the United States entry into World War II.

It deployed to the European Theater of Operations, assigned to VIII Fighter Command in August 1942. Its Airacobras were deemed unsuitable for the environment for escort duty. It was re-equipped with Supermarine Spitfires and was trained by the Royal Air Force. It flew some escort missions with VIII Bomber Command Boeing B-17 Flying Fortresses and Consolidated B-24 Liberators during the fall of 1942.

It was sent to North Africa in late 1942 as part of the Operation Torch invasion forces, and took up station in Algeria. It was reassigned to Twelfth Air Force and flew both fighter escort missions for the Flying Fortresses operating from Algeria and tactical interdiction strikes on enemy targets of opportunity in Algeria and Tunisia during the North African Campaign.

Following the German defeat and withdrawal from North Africa the squadron participated in the Allied invasion of Sicily and invasion of Italy and subsequent drive of the United States Fifth Army up the Italian Peninsula. Engaged primarily in tactical operations after November 1943, supporting ground forces and attacking enemy targets of opportunity such as railroads, road convoys, bridges, strafing enemy airfields and other targets. It deployed to Corsica in 1944 to attack enemy targets in support of Free French forces in the liberation of the island and to support Allied Forces in the invasion of Southern France. It continued offensive operations until the German capitulation in May 1945. It returned to the United States and was inactivated during the fall of 1945.

=== Air Defense Command ===
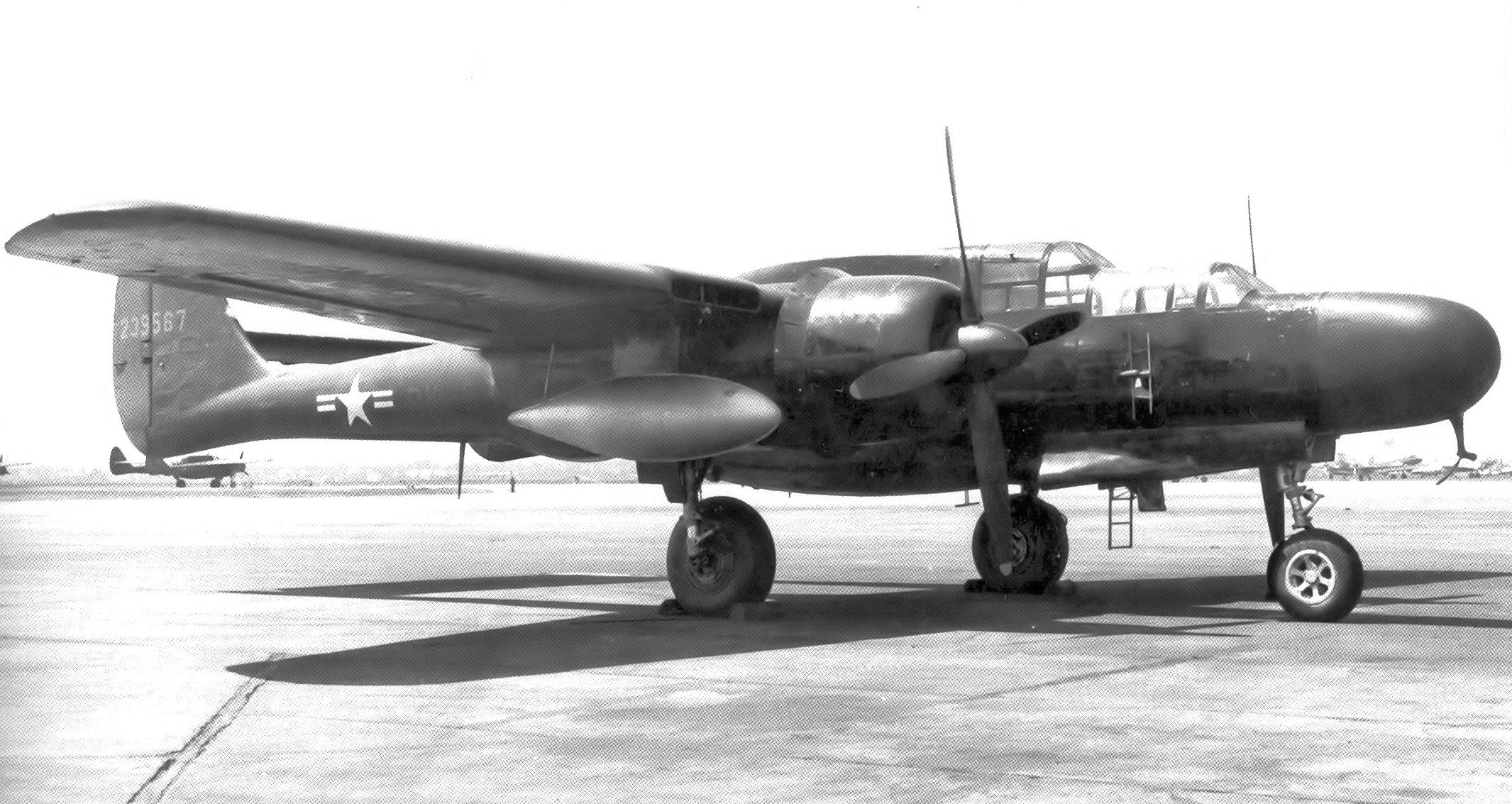
5th Fighter Squadron P-61B Black Widow (Note: Aircraft is Northrop P-61B-10-NO Black Widow, serial 42-39567, taken in December 1947.)

It was reactivated in 1946 as a United States Air Forces in Europe (USAFE) fighter squadron. It was primarily an occupation unit at Schweinfurt Airfield and Bad Kissingen Airfield in Germany. It was reassigned from USAFE to Air Defense Command (ADC) in June 1947, equipped with Northrop P-61 Black Widows, and stationed at Mitchel Field, New York, to perform air defense of the eastern United States.

In June 1948 the unit transitioned into North American F-82 Twin Mustangs. In the fall of 1949 the unit moved to McGuire Air Force Base, New Jersey. In August 1955 the 5th moved on paper to Suffolk County Air Force Base, New York. In the spring of 1957 the unit transitioned into Convair F-102 Delta Daggers.

In February 1960 the 5th moved to Minot Air Force Base, North Dakota, and transitioned into the Convair F-106 Delta Dart under the 32d Fighter Wing. Although the number of ADC interceptor squadrons remained almost constant in the early 1960s, attrition (and the fact that production lines closed in 1961) caused a gradual drop in the number of planes assigned to typical fighter squadrons, from 24 to typically 18 by 1964 and 12 by 1967. These reductions resulted in the squadron's parent 32d Fighter Wing's inactivation and the transfer of Minot to Strategic Air Command in July 1962.

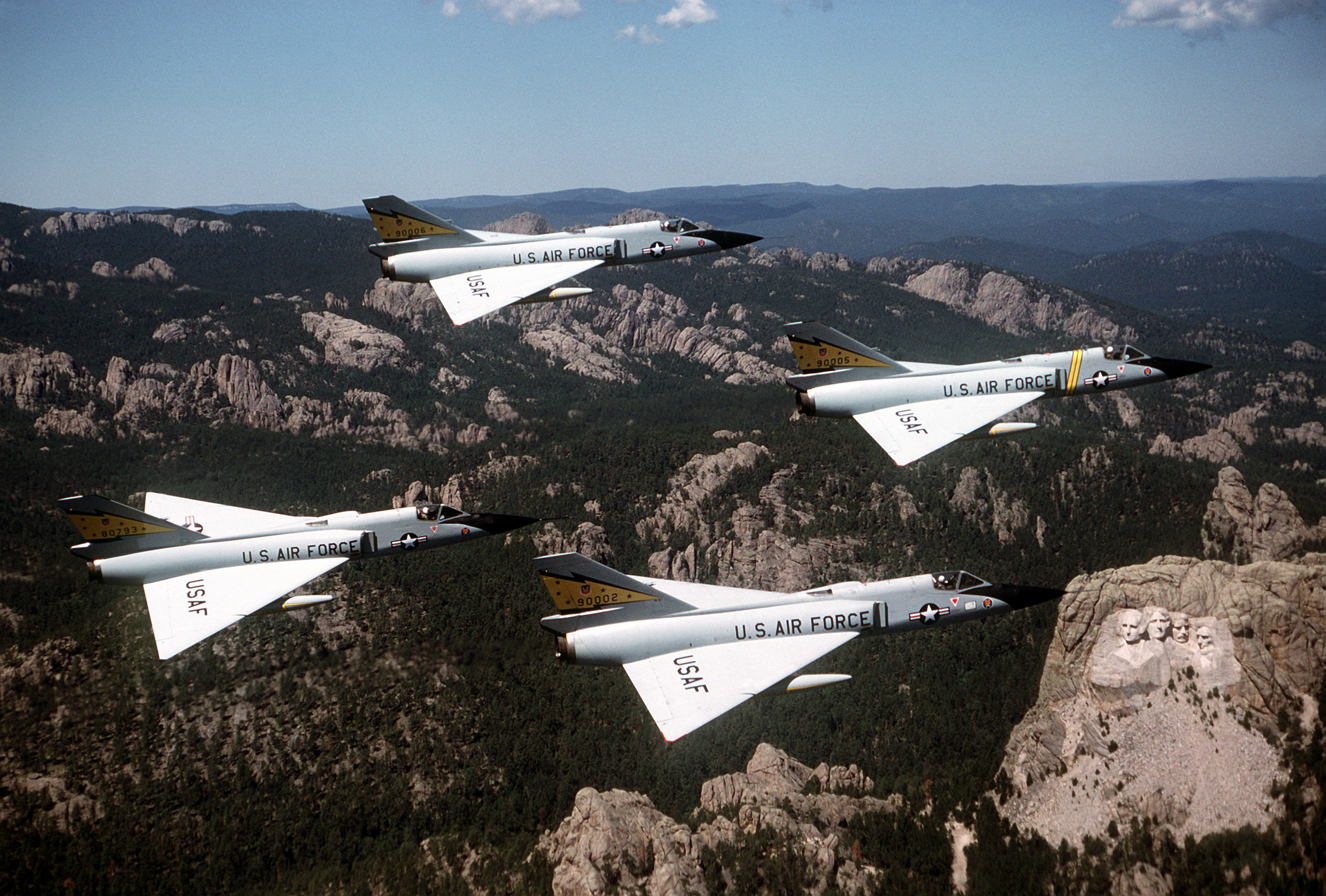
5th FIS F-106As flying past Mount Rushmore in 1981

On 22 October 1962, before President John F. Kennedy told Americans that missiles were in place in Cuba, the squadron dispersed one third of its force, equipped with nuclear tipped missiles to Hector Field at the start of the Cuban Missile Crisis. These planes returned to Minot after the crisis. In late 1962 the 5th acquired two live lynx kittens ("Spitten" and "Kitten") as mascots, with the assistance of the Minot Daily News, after a farmer had killed their mother.

In the mid-1980s the 5th converted to the McDonnell Douglas F-15 Eagles. The F-15s only flew over Minot until the spring of 1988, when the FIS was inactivated. The lynx den in the squadron was one of the few places where Canada lynx had bred in captivity in the U.S., prompting both the St. Louis and San Diego Zoos to copy it in an attempt to get their own lynx inhabitants to produce offspring. Several generations of lynx flourished there, and after the unit was inactivated, Delta and Dart, twin kitten descendants of the original two Lynx kitten mascots were donated to the Roosevelt Park Zoo in Minot.

=== Pilot training ===
It was reactivated in 1990 as an Air Training Command (later Air Education and Training Command) undergraduate pilot Training squadron at Vance Air Force Base, Oklahoma, but was inactivated in December of the following year. The squadron was activated again at Vance in 1997, but this time as a reserve unit. As an associate unit, it trains pilots and pilot instructors alongside the active duty members of the 71st Flying Training Wing.

== Lineage ==
- Constituted as the 5th Pursuit Squadron (Interceptor) on 20 November 1940

Activated on 15 January 1941
Redesignated 5th Fighter Squadron on 15 May 1942
Inactivated on 7 November 1945

- Activated on 9 November 1946

Redesignated 5th Fighter Squadron, All Weather on 10 May 1948
Redesignated 5th Fighter-All Weather Squadron on 20 January 1950
Redesignated 5th Fighter-Interceptor Squadron on 1 May 1951

- Inactivated on 1 July 1988

Redesignated 5th Flying Training Squadron on 1 January 1990

- Activated on 16 February 1990
- Inactivated on 15 December 1991

Redesignated 5th Flying Training Flight and activated in the reserve on 1 April 1997
Redesignated 5th Flying Training Squadron on 1 April 1998

=== Assignments ===
- 52d Fighter Group: 15 Jan 1941 – 7 Nov 1945
- 52d Fighter Group (later 52d Fighter-All Weather Group, 52d Fighter-Interceptor Group): 9 November 1946
- 4709th Defense Wing: 6 February 1952
- 568th Air Defense Group: 16 Feb 1953
- 4709th Defense Wing (later 4709th Air Defense Wing): 8 July 1954
- 52d Fighter Group: 18 August 1955
- 32d Fighter Group: 1 February 1960
- 32d Fighter Wing: 1 February 1961
- Minot Air Defense Sector: 1 July 1962
- Great Falls Air Defense Sector: 25 June 1963
- 28th Air Division: 1 April 1966
- 24th Air Division: 19 November 1969
- 25th Air Division: 1 June 1983
- Northwest Air Defense Sector: 1 December 1987 – 1 July 1988
- 71st Flying Training Wing: 16 February 1990 – 15 December 1991
- 610th Regional Support Group: 1 April 1997
- 340th Flying Training Group: 1 April 1998 – present

=== Stations ===
- Selfridge Field, Michigan. 15 January 1941
- Floyd Bennett Airport, New York, 17 December 1941
- Selfridge Field, Michigan, 14 January 1942
- Florence Army Air Field, South Carolina, 18 February 1942
- Bluethenthal Field, North Carolina, 27 April 1942
- Grenier Field, New Hampshire, 12 June 1942 – 19 July 1942
- Northern Ireland, 19 August 1942
- RAF Goxhill, England, 26 August 1942 – 27 October 1942
- Tafaraoui Airfield, Algeria, 8 November 1942 (air echelon only)
- La Senia Airfield, Algeria, 12 November 1942
- Orleansville Airfield, Algeria, 1 January 1943
- Telergma Airfield, Algeria, 19 January 1943
- Youks-les-Bains Airfield, Algeria, 8 March 1943
- Le Sers Airfield, Tunisia, 12 April 1943
- La Sebala Airfield, Tunisia, 20 May 1943
- Borizzo Airfield, Sicily, Italy, 1 August 1943
- Borgo Airfield, Corsica, France, 1 December 1943
- Madna Airfield, Italy, 14 May 1944
- Piagiolino Airfield, Italy, c. 24 April 1945
- Lesina Airfield, Italy, c. 10 July 1945 – August 1945
- Drew Field, Florida, 25 August 1945 – 7 November 1945
- Schweinfurt Airfield, Germany, 9 Nov 1946
- Bad Kissingen Airfield, Germany, 5 May 1947
- Mitchel Field (later Mitchel Air Force Base), New York, 25 Jun 1947
- McGuire Air Force Base, New Jersey, 4 October 1949
- Suffolk County Air Force Base, New York, 18 August 1955
- Minot Air Force Base, North Dakota, 1 February 1960 – 1 July 1988
- Vance Air Force Base, Oklahoma, 16 February 1990 – 15 December 1991
- Vance Air Force Base, Oklahoma, 1 April 1997 – present

=== Aircraft ===
- Curtiss P-40 Warhawk (1941–1942)
- Bell P-39 Airacobra (1942)
- Supermarine Spitfire (1942–1944)
- North American P-51 Mustang (1944–1945)
- Northrop P-61 Black Widow (1947–1948)
- North American F-82 Twin Mustang (1948–1951)
- Lockheed F-94A Starfire (1951–1953)
- North American F-86D Sabre (1953–1956)
- Convair F-102 Delta Dagger (1956–1960)
- Convair F-106 Delta Dart (1960–1985)
- McDonnell Douglas F-15 Eagle (1984–1988)
- Cessna T-37 Tweet (1990–1991, 1998–2006)
- Northrop T-38 Talon (1990–1991, 1998–Present)
- Raytheon T-1 Jayhawk (1998–Present)
- Beechcraft T-6A Texan II
