= 52nd Fighter Wing =

52nd Fighter Wing

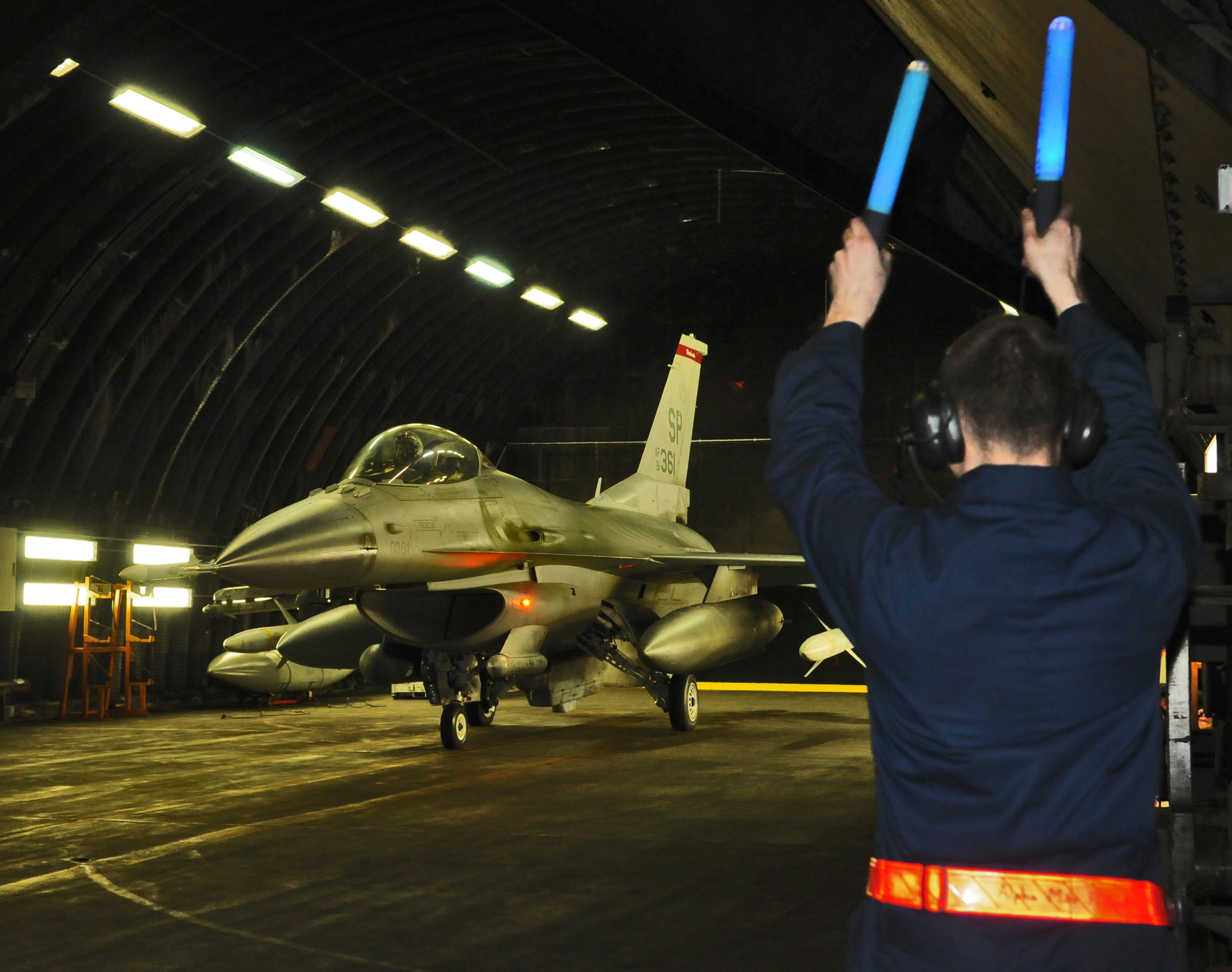
- F-16C Fighting Falcon taxiing out at Spangdahlem on 20 March 2011 in support of Operation Odyssey Dawn (Note: Aircraft is General Dynamics F-16C Block 50D Fighting Falcon, serial 91-0361.)
- Active: 1948–1952; 1963–1968; 1971–present
- Country: United States
- Branch: United States Air Force
- Type: Operational wing
- Role: Suppression of Enemy Air Defenses; Attack; Intelligence, surveillance and reconnaissance
- Part of: United States Air Forces in Europe – Air Forces Africa (Third Air Force)
- Base: Spangdahlem Air Base, Germany
- Nickname: Sabers
- Mottos: Seek, attack, destroy
- Decorations: Air Force Outstanding Unit Award with Combat "V" Device; Air Force Outstanding Unit Award
- Website: Official website

Commanders
- Current commander: Colonel William D. Lutmer
- Notable commanders: David L. Goldfein; Victor E. Renuart Jr.

Insignia
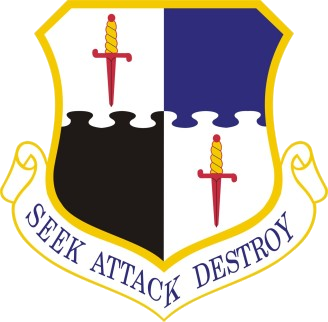
- 52nd Fighter Wing emblem (Note: Approved on 10 May 1951. It was originally approved for the 52d Fighter-Interceptor Group on 11 January 1951. The emblem was updated 3 December 1996. Description: quarterly per fess nebuly, first and fourth argent, each charged with a dagger in pale point downward gules, hilt and pommel of the same [color], grip or; second quarter azure; third quarter, sable.)
- Tail code: SP

Aircraft flown
- Attack: MQ-9 Reaper
- Fighter: F-16CJ Fighting Falcon

The 52nd Fighter Wing is a wing of the United States Air Force stationed at Spangdahlem Air Base, Germany. It flies the F-16CJ fighter aircraft. It was activated in 1948, but derives significant elements of its history from the predecessor Second World War 52nd Fighter Group, which is now the 52nd Operations Group, subordinate to the wing.

The wing provides United States Air Forces in Europe - Air Forces Africa and/or the NATO Supreme Allied Commander Europe with mission-ready personnel and systems. The assigned F-16 aircraft can be tasked to suppress enemy air defenses, provide close air support, carry out air interdiction, counter-air, strategic attack, and combat search and rescue. The wing also supports contingencies and operations other than war as required.

In concert with USAFE wings at Ramstein Air Base, Germany, the 52nd Fighter Wing directly supports the strategic mobility mission once conducted at Rhein-Main Air Base, Germany. The wing provides logistics support for C-17 Globemaster III and C-5 Galaxy aircraft, crew, passengers and cargo to sustain air mobility operations throughout Europe, Africa and Southwest Asia. The 52nd Fighter Wing also supports USAFE's Joint Fires Center of Excellence, whose mission is to conduct joint and combined training focused on the effective integration and application of tactical fires.

== Subordinate organizations ==
The wing is authorized about 5,000 service members and civilians. The wing is organized with five groups responsible for operations, maintenance, mission support and medical operations, and has headquarters staff.

52nd Operations Group (52 OG)

- 52nd Operations Support Squadron (52 OSS)
- 480th Fighter Squadron (480 FS) - General Dynamics F-16 Fighting Falcon
- Detachment 1 (52 OG Det 1) Łask Air Base, Poland
- Detachment 2 (52 OG Det 2) Mirosławiec Air Base, Poland - General Atomics MQ-9 Reaper

52nd Maintenance Group (52 MXG)

- 52nd Aircraft Maintenance Squadron (52 AMXS)
- 52nd Maintenance Squadron (52 MXS)

52nd Medical Group (52 MDG)

- 52nd Operational Medical Readiness Squadron (52 OMRS)
- 52nd Healthcare Operations Squadron (52 HCOS)
- 52nd Medical Support Squadron (52 MDSS)
- 852nd Medical Squadron (852 MDS) NATO Air Base Geilenkirchen, Germany

52nd Mission Support Group (52 MSG)

- 52nd Civil Engineer Squadron (52 CES)
- 52nd Communications Squadron (52 CS)
- 52nd Contracting Squadron (52 CONS)
- 52nd Force Support Squadron (52 FSS)
- 52nd Logistics Readiness Squadron (52 LRS)
- 52nd Security Forces Squadron (52 SFS)
- 470th Air Base Squadron (470 ABS) NATO Air Base Geilenkirchen, Germany

52nd Munitions Maintenance Group (52 MMG)

- 701st Munitions Support Squadron (701 MUNSS) Kleine Brogel Air Base, Belgium
- 702nd Munitions Support Squadron (702 MUNSS) Büchel Air Base, Germany
- 703rd Munitions Support Squadron (703 MUNSS) Volkel Air Base, Netherlands
- 704th Munitions Support Squadron (704 MUNSS) Ghedi Air Base, Italy

== History ==
=== Cold War ===
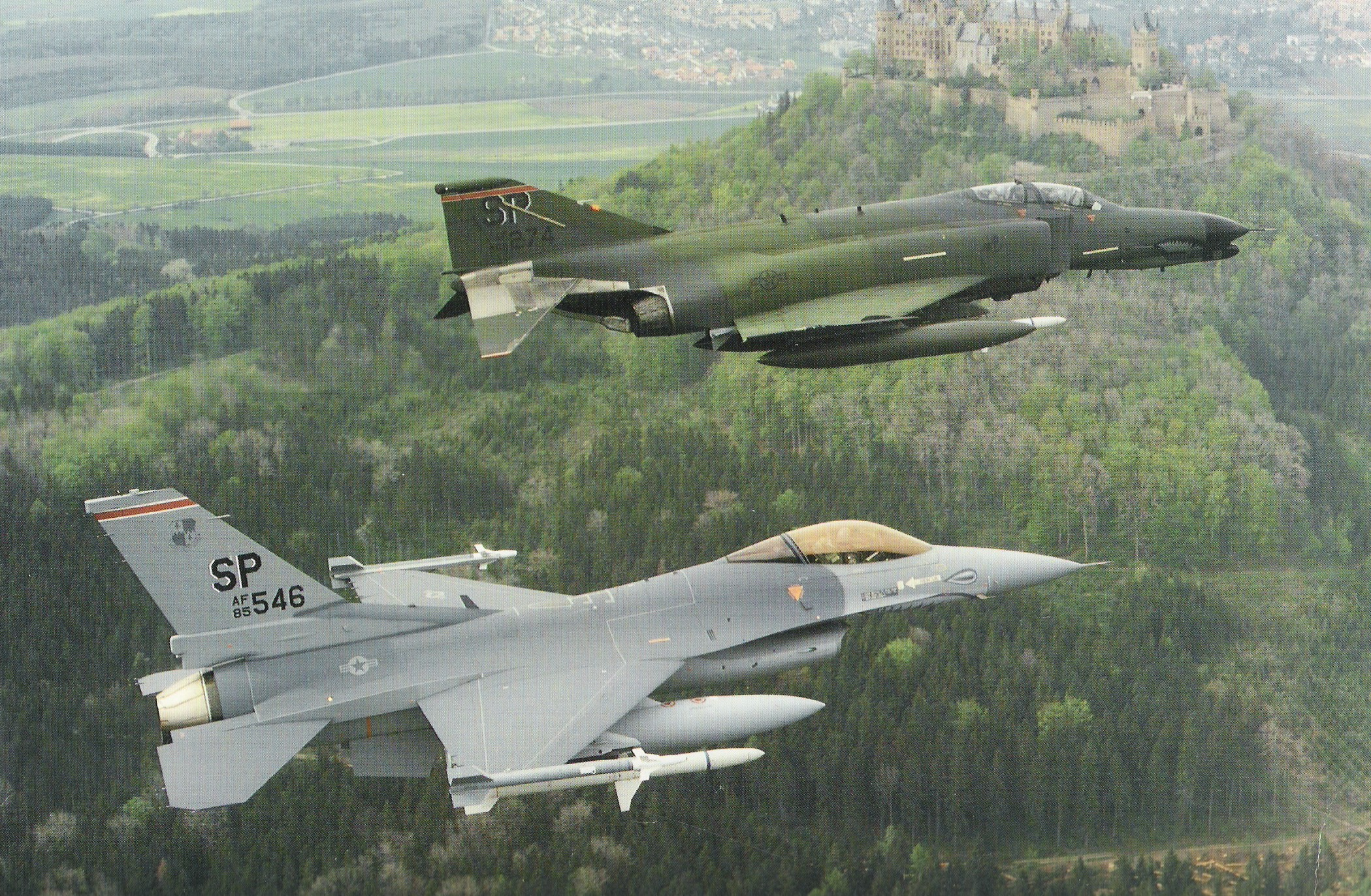
52nd TFW Wild Weasel-team in the late 1980s fly by Hohenzollern Castle.

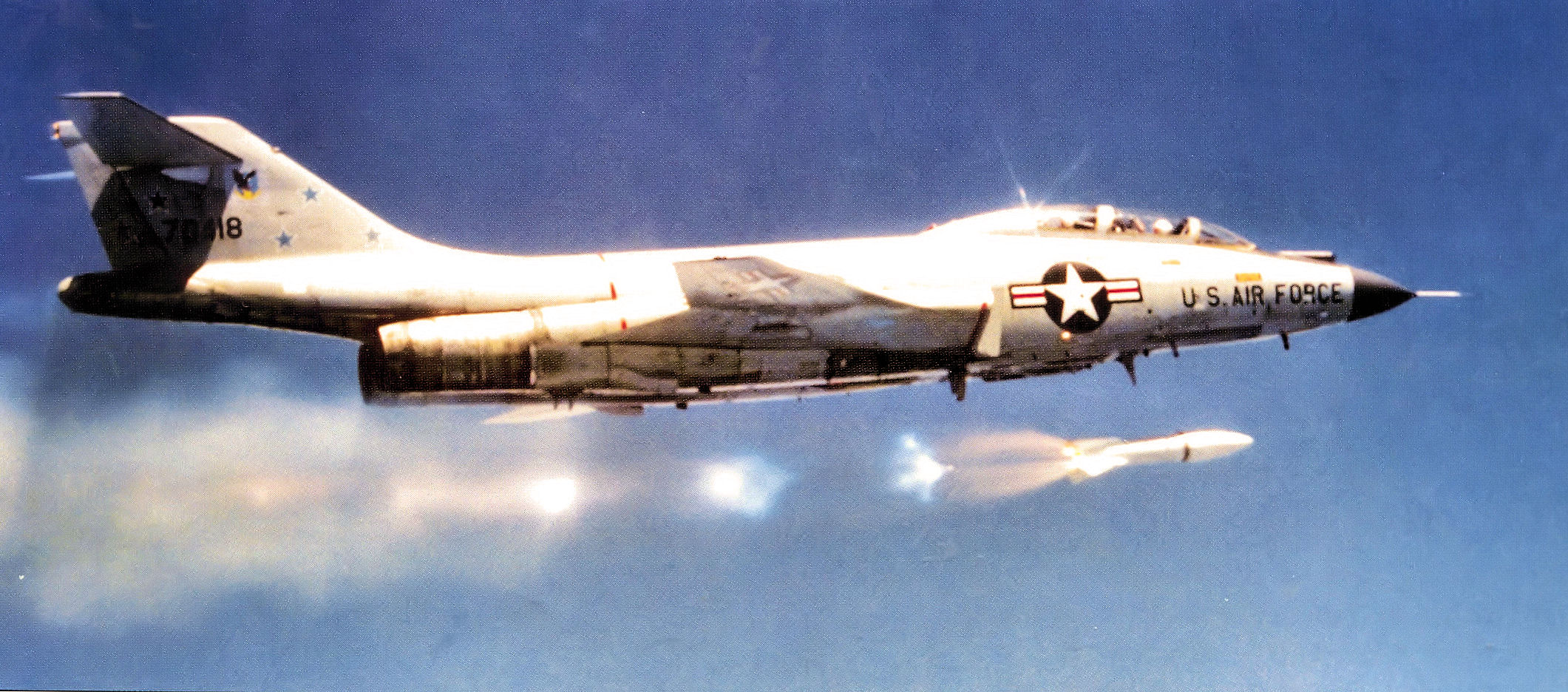
2nd Fighter-Interceptor Squadron McDonnell F-101B-100-MC Voodoo Suffolk County Air Force Base, New York, 1965 firing an MB-1 Genie air-to-air missile.

Established as the 52nd Fighter Wing, All Weather, on 10 May 1948, the wing served in the United States as an air defense unit in the northeastern United States from 1947 until the end of 1968.

The 52nd was reactivated on 18 August 1955 and designated 52nd Fighter Group (Air Defense). It was assigned to Air Defense Command and equipped with North American F-86 Sabre aircraft. It served once more as an air defense unit in the southeastern United States.

In December 1971, it became the host wing at Spangdahlem Air Base, Germany, and inherited tactical squadrons from the 36th Tactical Fighter Wing at nearby Bitburg Air Base. The wing participated in numerous tactical exercises, operations, and tests of USAFE and NATO and provided close air support, interdiction, and base defense operations. It operated with other NATO forces in frequent "squadron exchange" programs and hosted US-based units on temporary duty in Europe. In January 1973, a Wild Weasel defense suppression mission was added. After October 1985, using the F-4 Phantom II model aircraft, defense suppression became the wing's sole tactical mission. In 1987, the 52nd acquired F-16 Falcons and became the first wing to integrate F-16Cs with F-4Gs to form hunter/killer teams within individual fighter squadrons.

It deployed aircraft and personnel to strategic locations in Saudi Arabia and Turkey in support of the liberation of Kuwait from September 1990 – March 1993. Near the end of 1992, it began receiving A-10 Thunderbolt II aircraft. It received F-15 Eagles in 1994 but lost its F-4Gs. In January and December 1999, the wing supported Operations Northern Watch, Allied Force, and Decisive Forge with numerous deployments to Italy and Turkey.

=== Twenty-first century ===
Following the terrorist attacks on the World Trade Center and The Pentagon in the United States on 11 September 2001, the 52nd Fighter Wing began preparations for possible combat tasking. Within one month the wing had deployed people and equipment in support of Operation Enduring Freedom in and around Afghanistan. The 22nd Expeditionary Fighter Squadron began flying operations at a deployed location in support of the war on terrorism within 100 hours of tasking notification.

Personnel assigned to the 52nd FW continued to deploy for Operation Enduring Freedom circa 2020.

In April 2010 the wing's strength was reduced by one third. Twenty F-16Cs were flown to the 148th Fighter Wing, Minnesota Air National Guard, one F-16 was transferred to Edwards Air Force Base, California. All aircraft were from the 22nd Fighter Squadron. As a result of the drawdown of F-16s, the 22nd and 23rd Fighter Squadrons were inactivated on 13 August 2010 and formed a single "new" squadron, the 480th Fighter Squadron.

On 18 June 2013, the 81st Fighter Squadron was inactivated at Spangdahlem Air Force Base in Germany. The inactivation marked the end of A-10 operations in Europe at that time.

In December 2014, the wing commander, Col. Peter Bilodeau, who had commanded the wing for six months, was relieved of his command for "a loss of faith and confidence in his leadership." His deputy served as commander until Col. McFall took command.

On 1 April 2017, the 606th Air Control Squadron, Detachment 1 was inactivated at Spangdahlem Air Base in Germany following the relocation to Aviano Air Base, Italy.

=== Lineage ===
- Established as 52nd Fighter Wing, All Weather, on 10 May 1948

Activated on 9 June 1948
Redesignated 52nd Fighter-All Weather Wing on 20 January 1950
Redesignated 52nd Fighter-Interceptor Wing on 1 May 1951
Inactivated on 6 February 1952, personnel and subordinate units assigned to 4709th Air Defense Wing.

- Redesignated 52nd Fighter Wing (Air Defense), and activated, on 11 April 1963

Organized on 1 July 1963
Inactivated on 30 September 1968

- Redesignated 52nd Tactical Fighter Wing on 12 November 1971

Activated on 31 December 1971
Redesignated: 52nd Fighter Wing on 1 October 1991

=== Assignments ===
- First Air Force, 9 June 1948

Attached to Eastern Air Defense Force, 10 November 1949 – 31 August 1950

- Eastern Air Defense Force, 1 September 1950 – 6 February 1952
- Air Defense Command, 11 April 1963
- New York Air Defense Sector, 1 July 1963
- 21st Air Division, 1 April 1966
- 35th Air Division, 1 December 1967 – 30 September 1968

- Seventeenth Air Force, 31 December 1971
- 65th Air Division, 1 June 1985
- Seventeenth Air Force, 30 June 1991
- Third Air Force, 31 July 1996
- United States Air Forces in Europe, 1 November 2005
- Air Command Europe, 18 November 2005
- Third Air Force (Air Forces Europe), 1 December 2006 − present

=== Components ===
Wing

- 84th Fighter Wing (All Weather): attached 1 June 1949 – 2 June 1951

Group

- 52nd Fighter (later, 52nd Operations): 9 June 1948 – 6 February 1952; 31 March 1992 – present

Squadrons

- 2nd Fighter-Interceptor Squadron: 1 July 1963 – 30 September 1968
- 22nd Fighter Squadron: 1 April 1994 – 13 August 2010
- 23rd Fighter Squadron: 31 December 1971 – 13 August 2010 (detached 17 January – 15 March 1991)
- 39th Tactical Electronic Warfare Squadron: 31 December 1971 – 1 January 1973
- 58th Tactical Fighter Squadron: attached 8–22 August 1975
- 81st Tactical Fighter (later, 81st Fighter): 15 January 1973 – 18 June 2013
- 98th Fighter-Interceptor Squadron: 1 July 1963 – 30 September 1968
- 105th Fighter-Interceptor: attached 1 April 1951 – 6 February 1952
- 334th Tactical Fighter Squadron: attached 9–23 September 1975
- 335th Tactical Fighter Squadron: attached 11–25 July 1975
- 336th Tactical Fighter Squadron: attached 29 August – 20 September 1976
- 457th Tactical Fighter Squadron: attached 13–27 August 1977
- 480th Tactical Fighter (later, 480th Fighter): 15 November 1976 – 31 March 1993; 13 August 2010 – present
- 562nd Tactical Fighter Squadron: attached 12–30 August 1977
- 606th Air Control Squadron: 30 Sept 1995 - 1 April 2017

=== Stations ===
- Mitchel Field (later, Air Force Base), New York, 9 June 1948
- McGuire Air Force Base, New Jersey, 4 October 1949 – 6 February 1952
- Suffolk County Air Force Base, New York, 1 July 1963 – 30 September 1968
- Spangdahlem Air Base, Germany, 31 December 1971 – present

== Aircraft operated ==
- P/F-51 Mustang (1947–1948)
- F-82 Twin Mustang (1948–1952)
- F-94 Starfire (1950–1952)
- F-47 Thunderbolt (1951–1952)
- F-101 Voodoo (1963–1968)
- B-66 Destroyer (1971–1972)
- F-4 Phantom II (1971–1994)
- B-57 Canberra, 1974,1975
- A-7 Corsair II (1976)
- F-105 Thunderchief (1976–1977)
- F-15 Eagle (1994–1999)
- F-16 Fighting Falcon (1987–present)
- A-10 Thunderbolt II (1992–2013)

== Awards and decorations ==
- Distinguished Unit Citation
- Air Force Outstanding Unit Award with V Device

== See also ==
- List of wings of the United States Air Force
