= 52nd Operations Group =

52d Operations Group
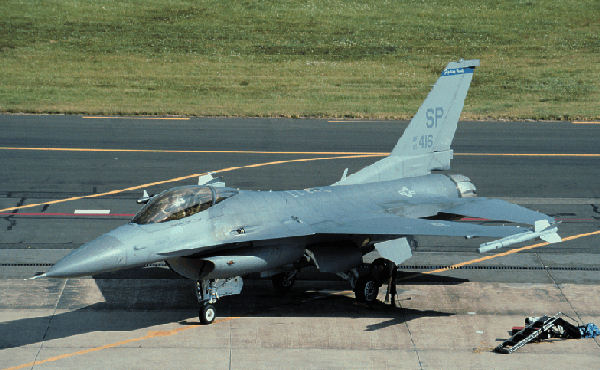
- General Dynamics F-16C Fighting Falcon of the group
- Active: 16 Jan 1941 – 7 Nov 1945; 9 Nov 1946 – 6 Feb 1952; 18 Aug 1955 – 1 July 1963; 30 Sep 1968 – 31 Dec 1969; 1 Apr 1971 – 31 July 1972; 31 Mar 1992 – present
- Country: United States
- Branch: United States Air Force
- Type: Fighter
- Part of: United States Air Forces in Europe - Air Forces Africa; 52d Fighter Wing
- Garrison/HQ: Spangdahlem Air Base
- Nickname: Yellow Tails (World War II)
- Mottos: Seek, Attack, Destroy
- Engagements: Mediterranean Theater of Operations Kosovo Campaign
- Decorations: Distinguished Unit Citation; Air Force Outstanding Unit Award with Combat "V" Device; Air Force Outstanding Unit Award

Insignia
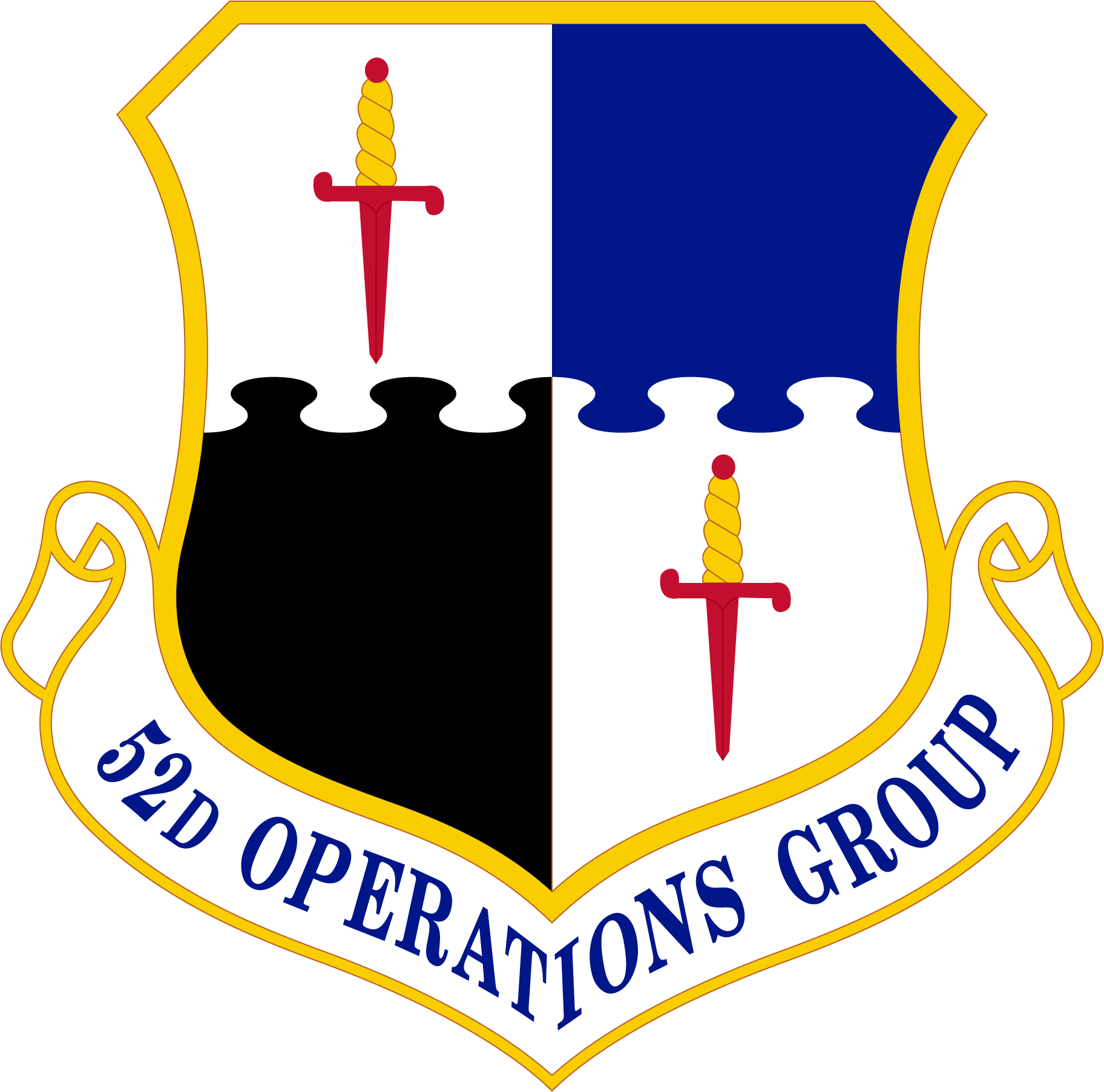
- 52d Operations Gp emblem (Note: The group uses the 52d Fighter Wing emblem with the group designation on the scroll. Robertson, Factsheet, 52 Operations Group)

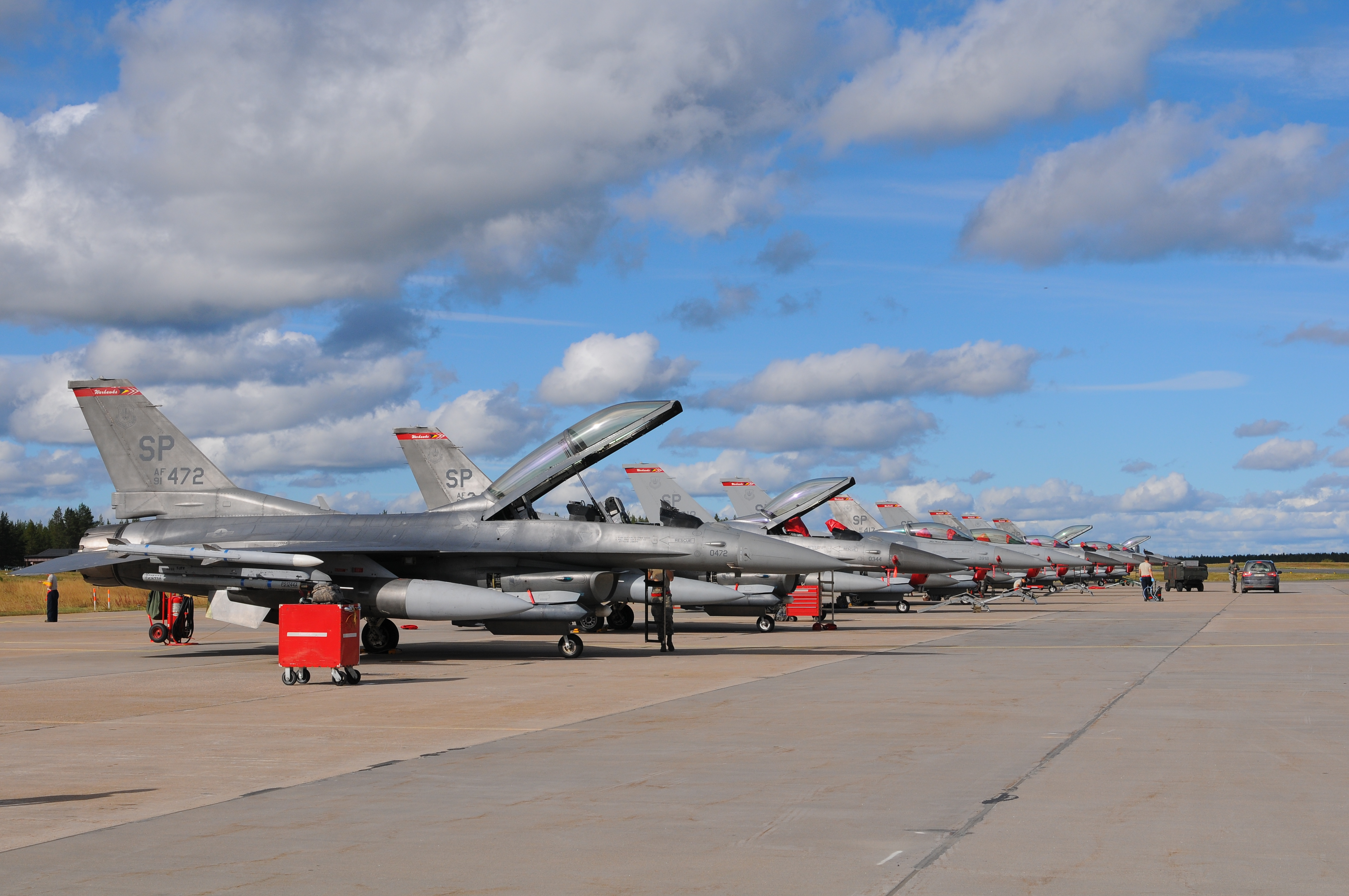
General Dynamics F-16CJ/DJ Fighting Falcons of the 480th Fighter Squadron on deployment at Kallax Air Base, Sweden, September 2012.

The 52d Operations Group is the flying component of the 52d Fighter Wing, assigned to the United States Air Forces in Europe - Air Forces Africa (USAFE-AFAFRICA). The group is stationed at Spangdahlem Air Base, Germany.

== Overview ==
The 52d Operations Group maintains, deploys and employs F-16 Falcon; MQ-9 Reaper aircraft and AN/TPS-75 radar systems in support of North Atlantic Treaty Organization (NATO) and national defense directives. The 52 OG supports the Supreme Allied Commander Europe with mission-ready personnel and systems providing expeditionary air power for suppression of enemy air defenses, close air support, air interdiction, counterair, air strike control, strategic attack, combat search and rescue, and theater airspace control.

The group also supports contingencies and operations other than war as required.

== Assigned Units ==
The 52 OG (Tail Code: SP) commands one flying squadron, one air control and one support squadron

- 480th Fighter Squadron "Warhawks" (Red tail stripe)

The 480 FS flies the F-16 Fighting Falcon aircraft conducting air superiority missions.

- 52d Operations Support Squadron "Griffins"

Responsible for all facets of airfield operations, air traffic control, weather, aircrew life support and training, intelligence analysis and support, weapons and tactics training, 52 FW battle staff operations, airspace scheduling, range ops and wing flying hour program.

- Detachment 2
  - Currently operating General Atomics MQ-9 Reaper temporarily deployed to Campia Turzil (RoAF 71st Air Base) from their usual base of Miroslawiec (12th Air Base).

== History ==
See 52d Fighter Wing for additional lineage and history

=== World War II ===
The unit was constituted as the 52d Pursuit Group (Interceptor) on 20 November 1940, activated at Selfridge Field, Michigan on 15 January 1941 with the 2d, 4th, and 5th Pursuit Squadrons assigned as its original squadrons. It was redesignated as the 52d Fighter Group in May 1942. The group trained with Bell P-39 Airacobra and Curtiss P-40 aircraft, and participated in maneuvers with them until 1942 when it moved to the United Kingdom, the air echelon arriving in July 1942 and the ground echelon in August.

The group trained with the Royal Air Force as part of Eighth Air Force, reequipped with Supermarine Spitfires and flew missions from England to France during August and September of that year.

RAF Code Letters	
2d Fighter Squadron	QP
4th Fighter Squadron	WD
5th Fighter Squadron	VF

Group pilots flew Spitfires from Gibraltar to Algeria during Operation Torch, the invasion of North Africa on 8 November 1942. The remainder of the group arrived by ship after the campaign in Algeria and Morocco had ended. The group then operated as part of Twelfth Air Force through April 1944, thereafter becoming a part of Fifteenth Air Force, serving in combat in the Mediterranean until the end of World War II. It flew escort, patrol, strafing, and reconnaissance missions to help defeat Axis forces in Tunisia. In Sicily, it attacked railroads, highways, bridges, coastal shipping and other targets to support the Allied operations. Having converted to North American P-51 Mustangs in April and May 1944, the group escorted bombers that attacked objectives in Italy, France, Germany, Czechoslovakia, Austria, Hungary, Romania, and Yugoslavia. It received a Distinguished Unit Citation (DUC) for a mission on 9 June 1944 when the group protected bombers that struck aircraft factories, communications centers, and supply lines in Germany. The 52d flew one of the first shuttle missions to Russia from 4–6 August 1944, and received a second DUC for strafing attacks on a landing field in Romania on 31 August 1944, destroying a large number of enemy fighter and transport planes. On 24 March 1945, the group's aircraft flew the longest escort mission ever flown in Europe—1600 miles round-trip to Berlin. By the end of the war, the group's Mustangs had adopted yellow markings that covered the entire tail of the aircraft, earning them the nickname of "Yellow Tails. The 52d returned to the US in August 1945 and was inactivated on 7 November 1945.

Aerial Victories	Number	Note
Group Hq	1	
2d Fighter Squadron	102.33	
4th Fighter Squadron	109	
5th Fighter Squadron	103.5	
52d Group Total	315.83	

=== Cold War ===
==== German Occupation Force ====
The 52d was reactivated in Germany on 9 November 1946 and was assigned to United States Air Forces Europe as the 52d Fighter Group (All Weather). (Note: Between 1946 and 1951, the group held three variations of this designation, becoming the 52d Fighter Group, All Weather in 1948 and the 52d Fighter All-Weather Group in 1950. Robertson, AFHRA Factsheet, 52 Operations Group. Retrieved 3 May 2012) It received Northrop P-61 Black Widows in early 1947, From 1946 to 1947, the 52d served as part of the occupation forces in Germany.

==== Air Defense Command ====
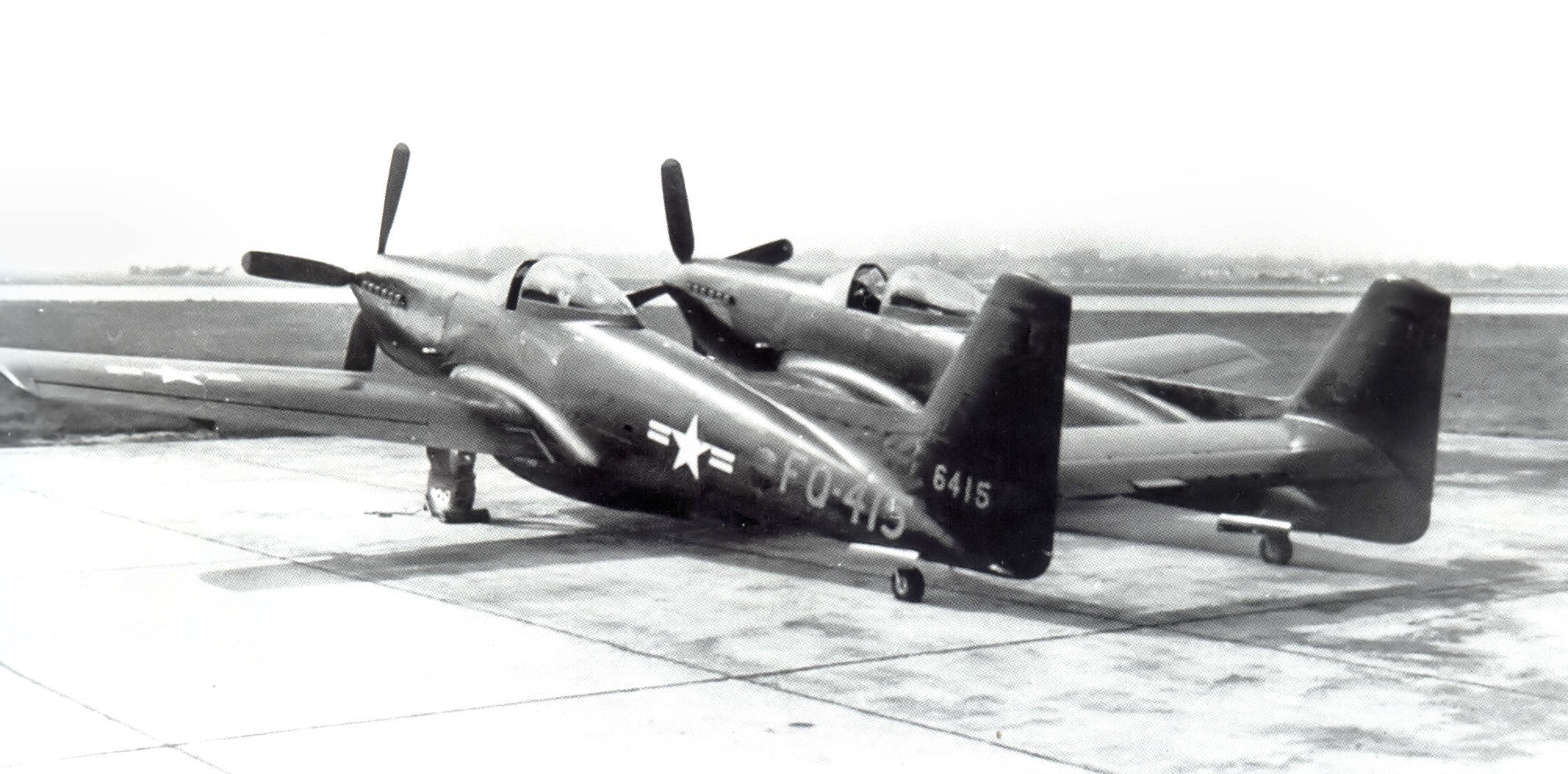
52d Fighter Group North American F-82 Twin Mustang 46-415, 1949.

In June 1947 the group was transferred without personnel and equipment to the United States, and became the 52d Fighter-Interceptor Group in May 1951 again flying P-61s and later North American F-82 Twin Mustangs, receiving its first jets, Lockheed F-94 Starfires beginning in 1950. In 1947, the Air Force began a service test of what was called the Hobson Plan to unify control at air bases. As a result of this test, the group was assigned to a provisional fighter wing at Mitchel Air Force Base, New York. This test proved the wing-base plan to the satisfaction of the Air Force and in 1948 group was assigned as the operational element of the 52d Fighter Wing before moving with the wing to McGuire Air Force Base, New Jersey. In a major reorganization of Air Defense Command (ADC) responding to ADC's difficulty under the existing wing base organizational structure in deploying fighter squadrons to best advantage. the 52d was inactivated along with the 52nd Fighter-Interceptor Wing on 6 February 1952 and its two operational squadrons were transferred to the recently activated 4709th Defense Wing.

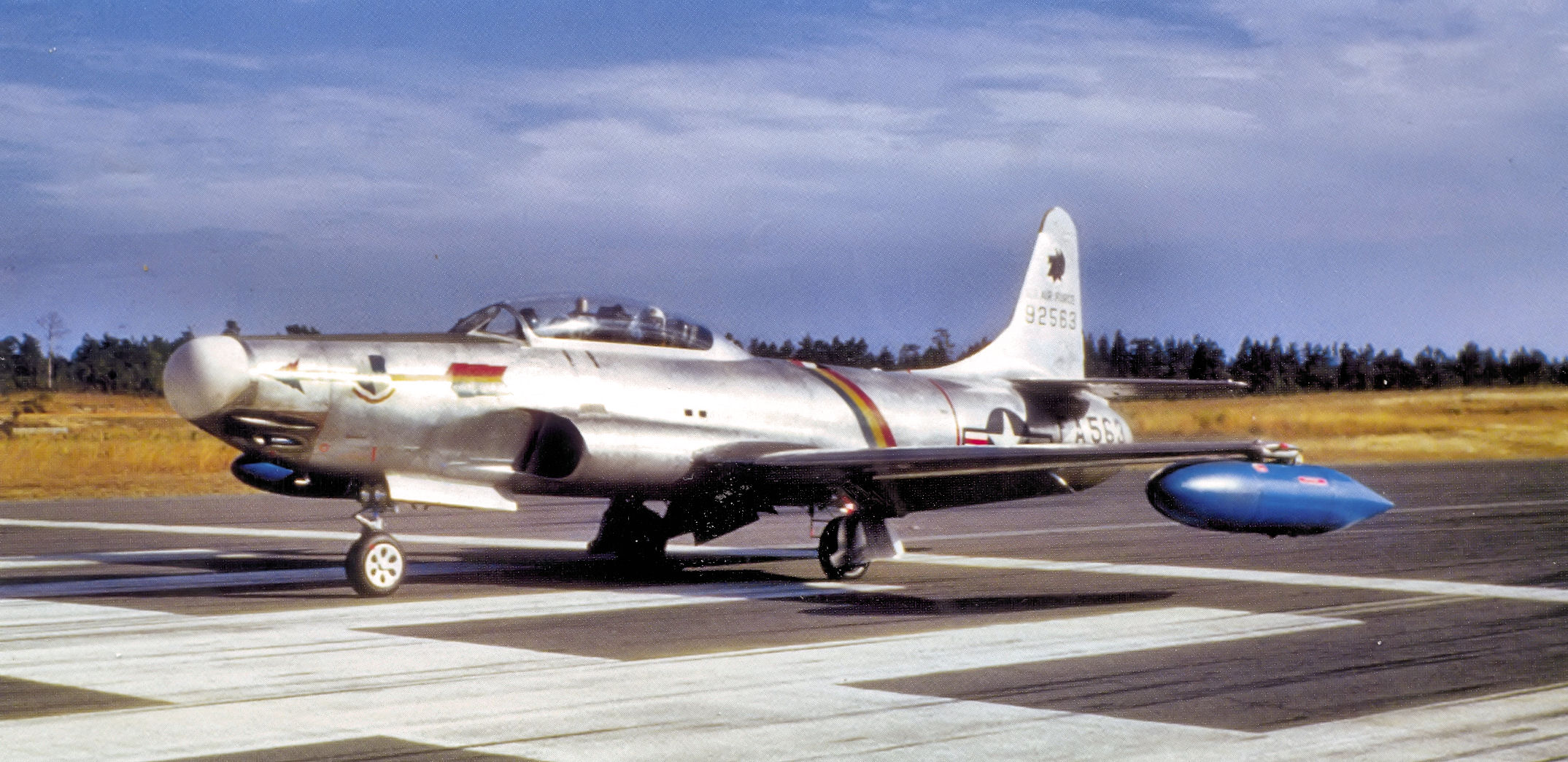
Lockheed F-94A Starfire 49-2563 at McGuire Air Force Base, July 1951.

The 52d was redesignated the 52d Fighter Group (Air Defense) and activated at Suffolk County Air Force Base, New York on 18 August 1955, replacing the 519th Air Defense Group as part of ADC's Project Arrow, a program to restore fighter units that had achieved distinction in the two World Wars. Because one of the additional objectives of Project Arrow was to reunite groups with their traditional squadrons, the 2d and 5th Fighter-Interceptor Squadrons (FIS) moved to Suffolk County from McGuire and took over the personnel, equipment, and radar equipped and rocket armed North American F-86D Sabre aircraft of the 75th and 331st FIS, which moved elsewhere. It also became the USAF host organization for Suffolk County and was assigned several support units to fulfill this function.

The 2d FIS converted to F-102 Delta Daggers in January 1957, followed by the 5th FIS in April. In December 1959, the 2d FIS began to fly F-101 Voodoos, while the 5th FIS retained its F-102s until moving to Minot Air Force Base, North Dakota two months later. The group served as an air defense unit in the New York/New Jersey area of the United States and also flew anti-submarine warfare missions until being inactivated in 1963 and replaced as the host unit at Suffolk County by the 52d Fighter Wing (Air Defense). In 1968, as USAF operations at Suffolk County were reduced, it once again activated with F-101s to replace the 52d wing and close down USAF operations at the station in 1969.

==== Return to Germany ====
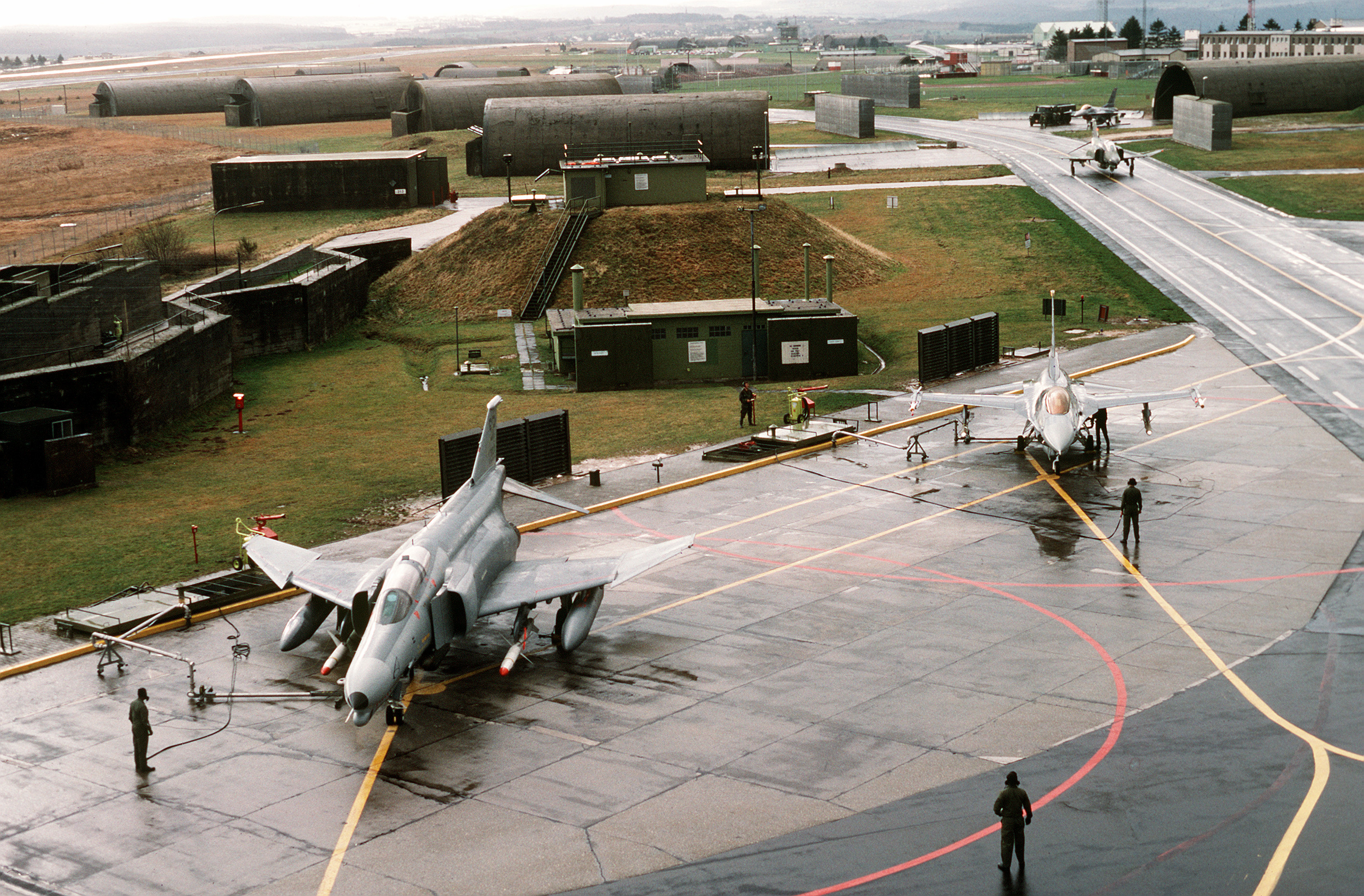
McDonnell Douglas F-4G Wild Weasel Vs and General Dynamics F-16C Fighting Falcons at Spangdahlem, 1990.

The 52d was redesignated the 52d Tactical Fighter Group and activated at Erding Air Base, West Germany under Seventeenth Air Force in 1971. The group provided administrative and logistical support as the USAF host unit at Erding for F-102 Delta Dagger NATO air defense operations, but had no tactical units assigned. In 1972 the F-102s were withdrawn from Europe and the 52d FG was inactivated.

=== Modern era ===
On 31 March 1992, the group was redesignated the 52d Operations Group (OG) and activated as a result of the USAF objective wing reorganization. Upon activation, the 52d OG assumed responsibility for the 52 Fighter Wing's operational squadrons and the newly activated 52d Operations Support Squadron.

During the 1990s, the wing supported no-fly zone operations over Bosnia and northern Iraq and combat operations against Serbia during Operation Allied Force in 1999. After terrorist attacks on the United States in 2001, the wing supported Operations Enduring Freedom and Iraqi Freedom, deploying combat and support elements in support of US and NATO missions. Although the group has also provided forces for Operation Urgent Fury, Operation Just Cause, Operation Southern Watch, Operation Coronet Macaw, Operation Restore Hope, Operation Support Justice and Operation Uphold Democracy, its forces were organized into provisional organizations, rather than remaining under group control for operations.

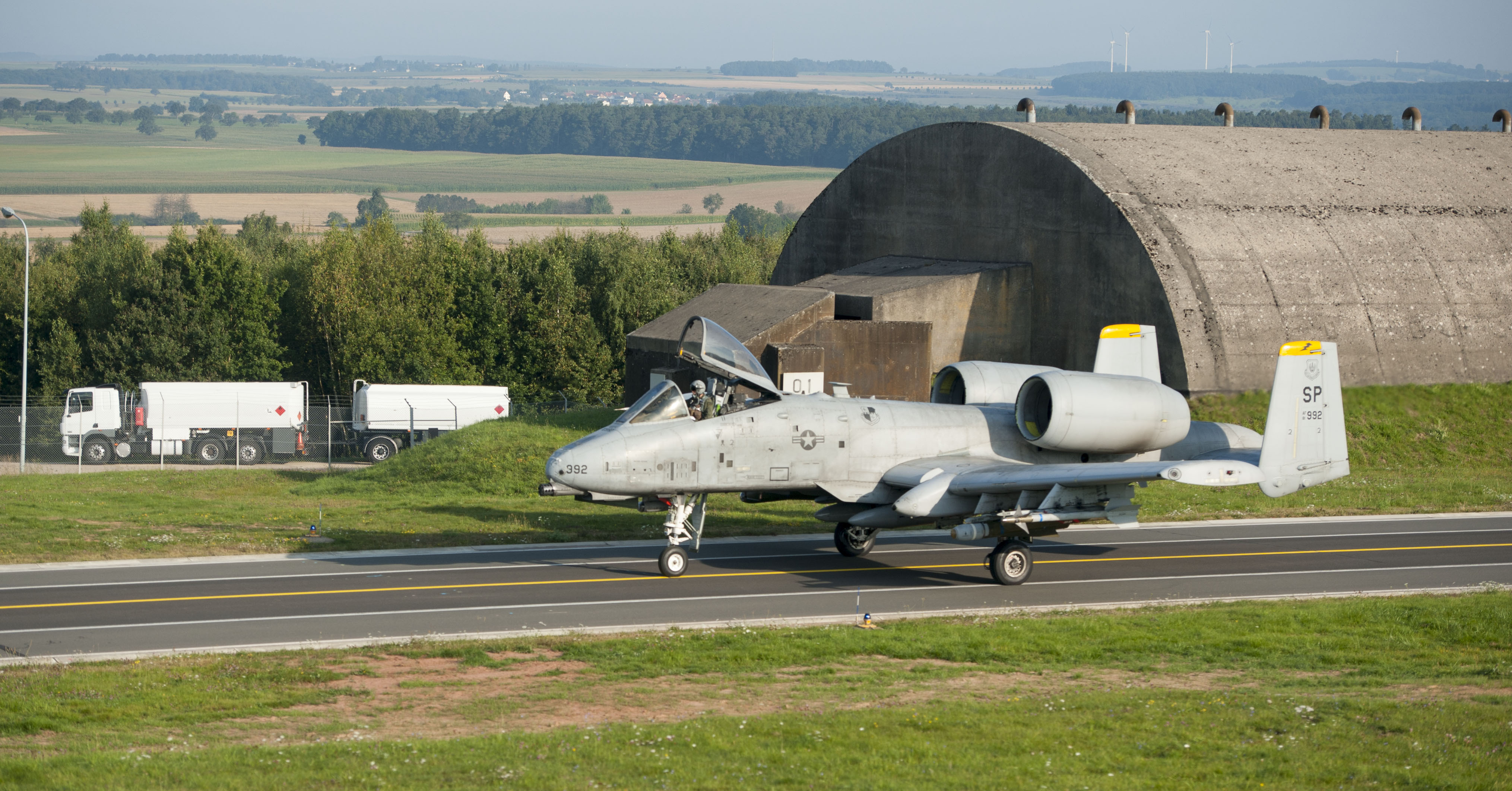
Fairchild Republic A-10C Thunderbolt II 81-0992 of the 81st Fighter Squadron taxiing at Spangdahlem, September 2012.

On 9 November 2012, the 52nd OG formed a detachment at Łask Air Base in Poland – 52nd OG Det 1.

The 81st Fighter Squadron was inactivated at Spangdahlem on 18 June 2013, leaving the 480th Fighter Squadron as the 52nd OG's sole flying unit.

== Lineage ==
- Constituted as the 52d Pursuit Group (Interceptor) on 20 November 1940

Activated on 16 January 1941
Redesignated 52d Fighter Group on 15 May 1942
Redesignated 52d Fighter Group, Single Engine ca. 20 August 1943
Inactivated on 7 November 1945

- Redesignated 52d Fighter Group (All Weather) on 18 October 1946

Activated on 9 November 1946
Redesignated: 52d Fighter Group, All Weather on 10 May 1948
Redesignated: 52d Fighter-All Weather Group on 20 January 1950
Redesignated: 52d Fighter-Interceptor Group on 1 May 1951
Inactivated on 6 February 1952

- Redesignated 52d Fighter Group (Air Defense) on 20 June 1955

Activated on 18 August 1955
Discontinued and inactivated, on 1 July 1963

- Activated on 30 September 1968

Inactivated on 31 December 1969

- Redesignated 52d Tactical Fighter Group on 17 February 1970

Activated on 1 April 1971
Inactivated on 31 July 1972

- Redesignated 52d Operations Group on 1 March 1992

Activated on 31 March 1992

=== Assignments ===
- 6th Pursuit Wing, 16 January 1941
- I Interceptor (later, I Fighter) Command, 1 October 1941
- First Air Force, c. 15 June 1942
- VIII Fighter Command (attached to Royal Air Force), 13 July 1942
- 6th Pursuit Wing, 18 August 1942
- XII Fighter Command, 14 September 1942 (attached to Tunis Fighter Sector, ca. 19 January 1943)
- XII Air Support Command, 18 February 1943
- Northwest African Coastal Air Force, 23 May 1943
- 1st Air Defense Wing, 19 August 1943
- 62d Fighter Wing, 1943
- 63d Fighter Wing, 16 November 1943
- Fifteenth Air Force, 1 May 1944
- 306th Bombardment (later, 306th Fighter) Wing, 3 May 1944
- 305th Bombardment Wing, 13 June – August 1945
- Third Air Force, 22 August – 7 November 1945
- 64th Fighter Wing, 9 November 1946
- XII Tactical Air Command, 15 May 1947
- Air Defense Command, 25 June 1947
- First Air Force, 29 October 1947
- 104th Wing (Provisional), 26 December 1947
- 52d Fighter Wing, All-Weather (later, 52d Fighter-All Weather Wing 52d Fighter-Interceptor Wing), 9 June 1948 – 6 February 1952
- 4709th Air Defense Wing, 18 August 1955
- 4707th Air Defense Wing, 1 March 1956
- 4709th Air Defense Wing, 8 July 1956
- 4621st Air Defense Wing (later, New York Air Defense Sector), 1 October 1956 – 1 July 1963
- 35th Air Division, 30 September 1968
- 21st Air Division, 19 November – 31 December 1969
- Seventeenth Air Force, 1 April 1971 – 31 July 1972
- 52d Fighter Wing, 31 March 1992 – present

=== Components ===
Operational Squadrons

- 2d Pursuit (later, 2d Fighter; 2d Fighter [All Weather]; 2d Fighter, All Weather; 2d Fighter-Interceptor) Squadron: 16 January 1941 – 7 November 1945; 9 November 1946 – 6 February 1952; 18 August 1955 – 1 July 1963; 30 September 1968 – 31 December 1969
- 4th Pursuit (later, 4th Fighter) Squadron: 16 January 1941 – 7 November 1945
- 5th Pursuit (later, 5th Fighter; 5th Fighter [All Weather]; 5th Fighter, All Weather; 5th Fighter-Interceptor) Squadron: 16 January 1941 – 7 November 1945; 9 November 1946 – 6 February 1952; 18 August 1955 – 1 February 1960
- 22d Fighter Squadron: 1 April 1994 – 12 August 2010
- 23d Fighter Squadron: 31 March 1992 – 12 August 2010
- 53d Fighter Squadron: 25 February 1994 – 31 March 1999
- 81st Fighter Squadron: 31 March 1992 – 18 June 2013
- 98th Fighter-Interceptor Squadron: attached, c. 20 June – 1 July 1963
- 480th Fighter Squadron: 31 March 1992 – 1 April 1994, 13 August 2010 – present
- 510th Fighter Squadron: 1 October 1992 – 1 February 1994

Support Organizations

- 52d USAF Infirmary (later 52d USAF Dispensary), 18 August 1955 – 1 July 1963, 30 December 1968 – 31 December 1969
- 52d Air Base Squadron (later 52d Combat Support Squadron), 18 August 1955 – 1 July 1963, 30 December 1968 – 31 December 1969
- 52d Consolidated Aircraft Maintenance Squadron, 8 July 1957 – 1 July 1963, 30 December 1968 – 31 December 1969
- 52d Materiel Squadron, 18 August 1955 – 1 July 1963
- 52d Operations Support Squadron, 1 October 1992 – present
- 52d Supply Squadron, 30 December 1968 – 31 December 1969
- 606th Air Control Squadron, 1 October 1993 – present
- 7026th Combat Support Squadron, 1 April 1971 – 31 July 1972
- 29th Crash Rescue Boat Flight, 18 August 1955 - ca. 8 September 1955

=== Stations ===
- Selfridge Field, Michigan, 16 January 1941
- Norfolk Airport, Virginia, 18 December 1941
- Selfridge Field, Michigan, 16 January 1942
- Florence Army Airfield, South Carolina, 18 February 1942
- Wilmington Airport, North Carolina, 27 April 1942
- Grenier Field, New Hampshire, 14 – 24 June 1942
- RAF Eglinton (USAAF Station 344), Derry, Northern Ireland, 14 July 1942
- RAF Goxhill (USAAF Station 345), England, 26 August – 22 October 1942
- Tafaraoui Airfield, Algeria, 9 November 1942
- La Senia Airfield, Oran, Algeria, 14 November 1942
- Orleansville Airfield, Algeria, 2 January 1943
- Telergma Airfield, Algeria, 20 January 1943
- Youks-les-Bains Airfield, Algeria, 9 March 1943
- Le Sers Airfield, Tunisia, 14 April 1943
- La Sebala Airfield, Tunisia, 21 May 1943
- Boccadifalco Airfield, Sicily, 30 July 1943
- Borgo Airfield, Corsica, 1 December 1943
- Aghione Airfield, Corsica, 23 April 1944
- Madna Airfield, Italy, 19 May 1944
- Piagiolino Airfield, Italy, 21 April 1945
- Lesina Airfield, Italy, 8 July – 10 August 1945
- Drew Field, Florida, 25 August – 7 November 1945
- AAF Station Schweinfurt, Germany, 9 November 1946
- AAF Station Bad Kissingen, Germany, 5 May – 25 June 1947
- Mitchel Field (later Mitchel Air Force Base), New York, 25 June 1947
- McGuire Air Force Base, New Jersey, 4 October 1949 – 6 February 1952
- Suffolk County Air Force Base, New York, 18 August 1955 – 1 July 1963; 30 September 1968 – 31 December 1969

Detachment operated at Atlantic City Airport, New Jersey, 30 September 1968 – 31 December 1969

- Erding Air Base, West Germany, 1 April 1971 – 31 July 1972
- Spangdahlem Air Base, Germany, 31 March 1992 – present

Detachment operated at Łask Air Base, Poland, 9 November 2012 – present

=== Awards and campaigns ===
Award streamer	Award	Dates	Notes
	Distinguished Unit Citation	9 June 1944	52d Fighter Group, Munich
	Distinguished Unit Citation	31 August 1944	52d Fighter Group, Rumania
	Air Force Outstanding Unit Award with Combat "V" Device	19 March 2003 – 16 April 2003	52d Operations Group
	Air Force Outstanding Unit Award	(31 March 1992) – 30 June 1993	52d Operations Group
	Air Force Outstanding Unit Award	1 July 1993 – 30 June 1995	52d Operations Group
	Air Force Outstanding Unit Award	1 August 1995 – 31 July 1997	52d Operations Group
	Air Force Outstanding Unit Award	1 July 1997 – 30 June 1999	52d Operations Group
	Air Force Outstanding Unit Award	24 March 1999 – 1 June 1999	52d Operations Group
	Air Force Outstanding Unit Award	1 July 1999 – 30 June 2001	52d Operations Group
	Air Force Outstanding Unit Award	1 July 2001 – 30 June 2003	52d Operations Group
	Air Force Outstanding Unit Award	1 July 2003 – 30 June 2005	52d Operations Group

Campaign or Service Streamer	Campaign	Dates	Notes
	American Theater without inscription	7 December 1941-24 Jun 42	52d Fighter Group
	Air Offensive, Europe	16 August 1942 – 5 June 1944	52d Fighter Group
	Air Combat, EAME Theater	26 August-11 May 1945	52d Fighter Group
	Algeria-French Morocco	9 November 1942 – 11 November 1942	52d Fighter Group
	Tunisia	12 November 1942 – 13 May 1943	52d Fighter Group
	Sicily	14 May 1943 – 17 August 1943	52d Fighter Group
	Naples-Foggia	18 August 1943 – 21 January 1944	52d Fighter Group
	Rome-Arno	22 January 1944 – 9 September 1944	52d Fighter Group
	Normandy	6 June 1944 – 24 July 1944	52d Fighter Group
	Northern France	25 July 1944 – 14 September 1944	52d Fighter Group
	Southern France	15 August 1944 – 14 September 1944	52d Fighter Group
	North Apennines	10 September 1944 – 4 April 1945	52d Fighter Group
	Rhineland	15 September 1944 – 21 March 1945	52d Fighter Group
	Central Europe	22 March 1944 – 21 May 1945	52d Fighter Group
	Po Valley	3 April 1945 – 8 May 1945	52d Fighter Group
	World War II Army of Occupation (Germany)	9 November 1946 – 15 June 1947	52d Fighter Group
	Kosovo		52d Operations Group

=== Aircraft assigned ===
- Curtiss P-40 Warhawk (1941–1942)
- Bell P-39 Airacobra (1942)
- Supermarine Spitfire (1942–1944)
- North American P-51 Mustang (1944–1945)
- Northrop P-61 Black Widow (1947, 1947–1948)
- North American F-82 Twin Mustang (1948–1952)
- Lockheed F-94 Starfire (1950–1952)
- North American F-86 Sabre (1955–1957)
- McDonnell F-101 Voodoo (1959–1963, 1968–1969)
- Convair F-102 Delta Dagger (1957–1960)
- McDonnell Douglas F-4G Wild Weasel V (1992–1994)
- General Dynamics F-16C/D Fighting Falcon (1992–present)
- Fairchild Republic A-10 Thunderbolt II (1992–2013)
- McDonnell Douglas F-15C/D Eagle, 1994–1999

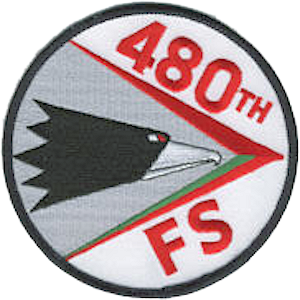
480 FS

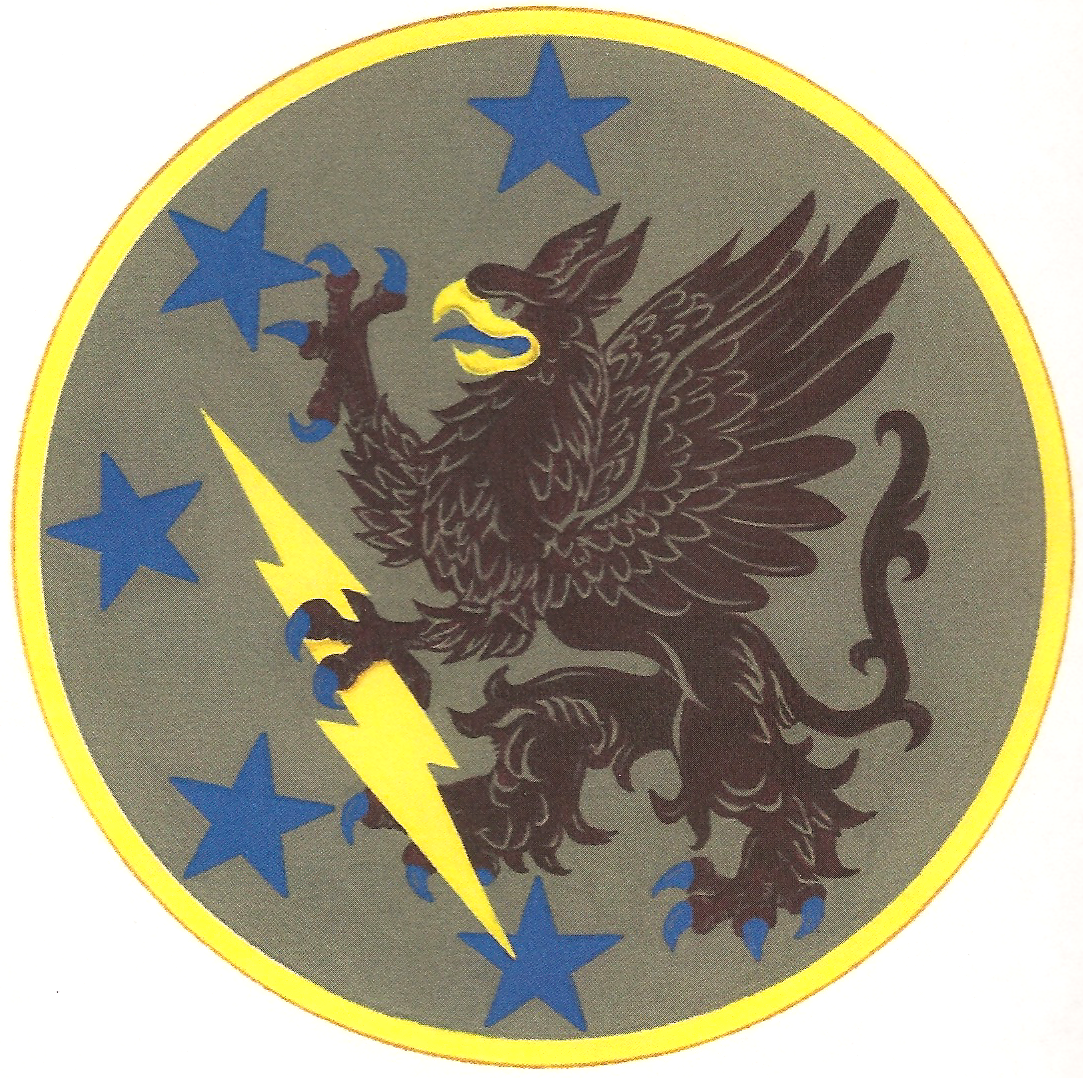
52 OSS
