= Aghione Airfield =

Defunct airport in Corte, France

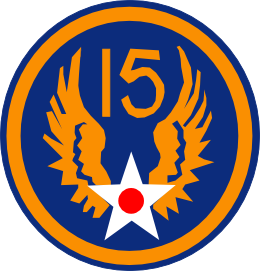
Aghione Airfield 15th USAAF patch
- Part of Fifteenth Air Force

Site information
- Type: Military Airfield
- Controlled by: United States Army Air Forces

Location
- Coordinates: 42°07′41.69″N 009°23′06.79″E

Site history
- Built: 1943
- In use: 1943

Location of Aghione Airfield, France

Aghione Airfield is an abandoned World War II military airfield in France, which was located approximately 27 km southeast of Corte on Corsica. It was an all-weather temporary field built by the XII Engineer Command using Pierced Steel Planking for runways and parking areas, as well as for dispersal sites. In addition, tents were used for billeting and also for support facilities; an access road was built to the existing road infrastructure; a dump for supplies, ammunition, and gasoline drums, along with drinkable water and minimal electrical grid for communications and station lighting.

The airfield was primarily used by the United States Army Air Force Fifteenth Air Force 52d Fighter Group between 23 April and 19 May 1944, flying combat operations with P-51 Mustang. Also, the 1st Fighter Group deployed sixty P-38 Lightnings of the 94th Fighter Squadron to Aghione providing air support for the Allied invasion of Southern France between 10 and 21 August 1944. In addition, the airfield was used by Fifteenth Air Force 306th Fighter Wing, which deployed P-51 Mustangs to the base from several groups to support the landings in Southern France.

After Operation Dragoon, the airfield was closed and dismantled. Today, there are traces of the airfield remaining on the landscape visible from aerial photography, but no buildings or physical features remain.
