= Orleansville Airfield =

World War II military airfield in Algeria

Orleansville Airfield
- Part of Twelfth Air Force

Site information
- Type: Military airfield
- Controlled by: United States Army Air Forces

Location
- Coordinates: 36°09′54.41″N 001°19′36.80″E (Approximate)

Site history
- Built: 1942
- In use: 1942-1943

Location of Orleansville Airfield, Algeria

Orleansville Airfield was a World War II military airfield in Algeria, near Chlef, approximately 170 km southwest of Algiers. It was a temporary airfield constructed by Army Engineers using compacted earth for its runway, parking and dispersal areas, not designed for heavy aircraft or for long-term use. The prevailing temperatures in the area are some of the hottest in the world, making steel planking unsuitable for airfield use.

The airfield was used by the United States Army Air Force Twelfth Air Force 52d Fighter Group during the North African Campaign against the German Afrika Korps. It operated from the field between 2–20 January 1943.

After the 52d moved out the airfield was dismantled. Today, there are no remaining traces of the airfield as the area around the town of Chlef has grown substantially since the war. The urban development has obliterated any trace of the airfield. It is unknown precisely where the airfield was located due to the changed landscape over the past 60 years.
