= Piagiolino Airfield =

Cattolica Airfield
- Part of Fifteenth Air Force

Site information
- Type: Military airfield
- Controlled by: United States Army Air Forces

Location
- Coordinates: 43°43′21.31″N 013°04′24.61″E

Site history
- Built: 1944
- In use: 1945

Location of Piagiolino Airfield, Italy

Piagiolino Airfield is an abandoned World War II military airfield in Italy, which was located about 1 km southwest of Monterado (Provincia di Ancona, The Marches); 200 km north of Rome. It was a temporary all-weather airfield used by the 52d Fighter Group between 21 April and 8 July 1945.

Today, the land on which the airfield existed can be identified by the scarring on the earth evident in aerial photographs.
