= Le Sers Airfield =

Airfield in Tunisia

Le Sers Airfield
- Part of Twelfth Air Force

Site information
- Type: Military airfield
- Controlled by: United States Army Air Forces

Location
- Coordinates: 36°03′21.15″N 009°00′57.53″E

Site history
- Built: 1943
- In use: 1943

Location of Le Sers Airfield, Tunisia

Le Sers Airfield is an abandoned World War II military airfield in Tunisia, about 3 km of As Sars, 130 km southwest of Tunis. It was a temporary airfield constructed by Army Engineers using compacted earth for its runway, parking and dispersal areas. It was not designed for heavy aircraft or for long-term use. The prevailing temperatures in the area are some of the hottest in the world, making steel planking unsuitable for airfield use.

Its last known use was by the United States Army Air Force Twelfth Air Force in 1943 during the North African Campaign. The 31st Fighter Group flew Supermarine Spitfires from the airfield between 12 April and 15 May; the 52d Fighter Group flew P-40 Warhawks between 14 April and 21 May.

The fighter units moved out after the Tunisian Campaign ended to airfields closer to the coast and the airfield was closed and the airfield was dismantled. Today, there are no remaining traces of the airfield as the area around the town of As Sars consists largely of agricultural fields, which has obliterated much of the airfield. Today the remains of a runway are visible from satellite imagery.
