= La Sebala Airfield =

World War II military airfield in Tunisia

La Sebala Airfield
- Part of Twelfth Air Force

Site information
- Type: Military airfield
- Controlled by: United States Army Air Forces

Location
- Coordinates: 36°55′29.45″N 010°06′04.79″E

Site history
- Built: 1943
- In use: 1943

Location of La Sebala Airfield, Tunisia

La Sebala Airfield is an abandoned World War II military airfield in Tunisia, located about 1 km north of Cebalat; 15 km north-northwest of Tunis.

It was first used as an airfield and landing ground by the Luftwaffe in 1942 and 1943. Jagdgeschwader 53 was based there from November 1942 to April 1943.

It was a temporary airfield constructed by Army Engineers using compacted earth for its runway, parking and dispersal areas, not designed for heavy aircraft or for long-term use.

The airfield was used by the United States Army Air Force Twelfth Air Force 52d Fighter Group between 21 May and 30 July 1943, flying combat operations with P-40 Warhawks over Sicily and Italy, as well as taking part in the Pantelleria reduction.

After the 52d moved to Boccadifalco on Sicily, the airfield was closed and dismantled. Today, there are traces of the airfield on the landscape visible from aerial photography, but no buildings or physical features.
