= Northrop P-61 Black Widow =

US Air Force night fighter in service 1944-1954

P-61 Black Widow
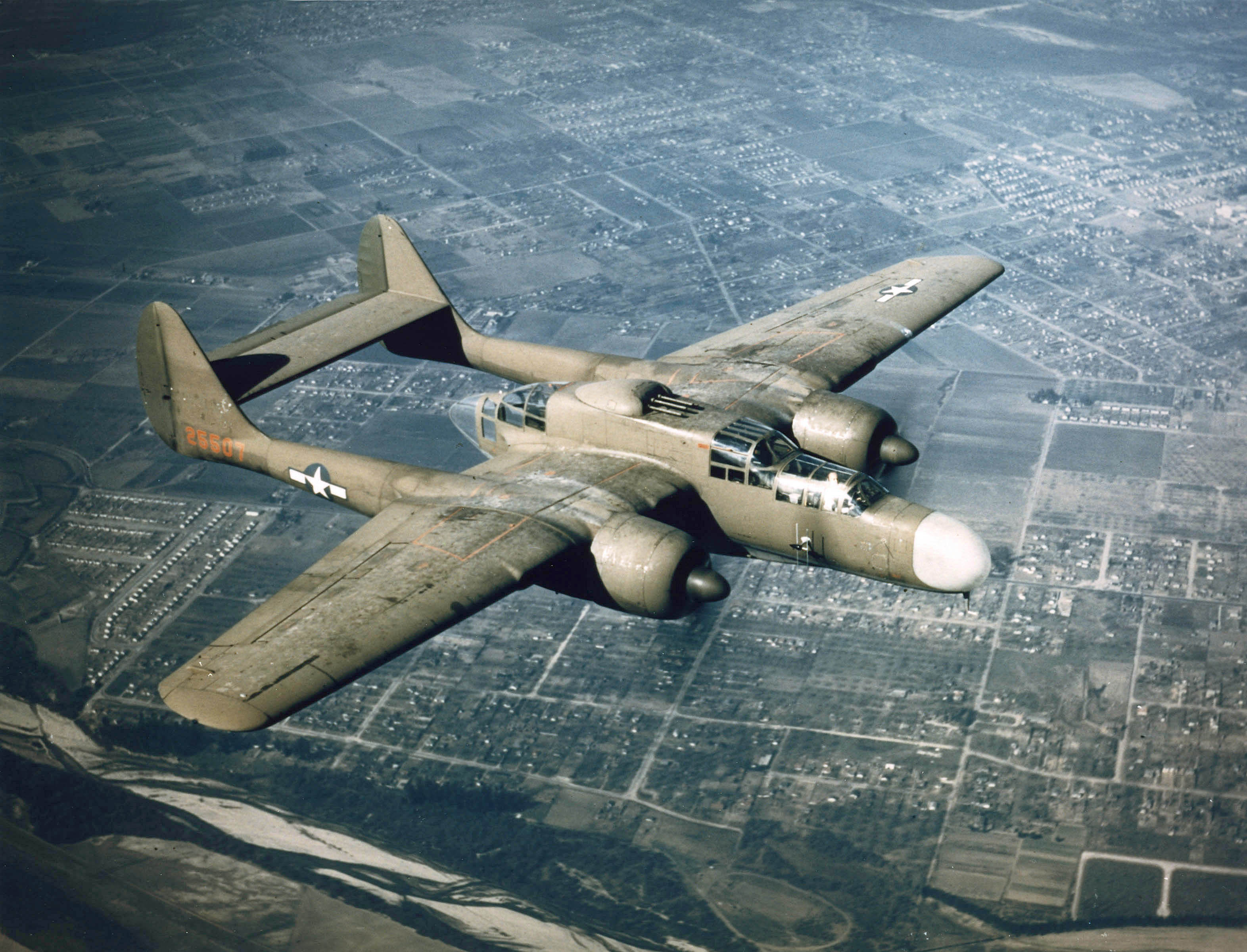
- A P-61A of 419th Night Fighter Squadron

General information
- Type: Night fighter
- National origin: United States
- Manufacturer: Northrop
- Primary users: United States Army Air Forces United States Air Force
- Number built: 706

History
- Introduction date: 1944
- First flight: 26 May 1942
- Retired: 1954
- Variant: Northrop F-15 Reporter

The Northrop P-61 Black Widow is a twin-engined United States Army Air Forces fighter aircraft of World War II. It was the first U.S. aircraft conceived from the outset and deployed operationally specifically as a night fighter, incorporating onboard radar as part of the original airframe design.

Named for the North American spider Latrodectus mactans, it was an all-metal, twin-engined, twin-boom design armed with four forward-firing 20 mm (.79 in) Hispano M2 autocannons in the lower fuselage, and four .50 in (12.7 mm) M2 Browning machine guns in a dorsal gun turret. It was developed during the war, and its first test flight was made on 26 May 1942. The first production aircraft rolled off the assembly line in October 1943.

Although not produced in the large numbers of its contemporaries, the Black Widow was operated effectively as a night fighter by United States Army Air Forces (USAAF) squadrons in the European Theater, Pacific Theater, China Burma India Theater, and Mediterranean Theater during World War II. It replaced earlier British-designed night-fighter aircraft that had been updated to incorporate radar when it became available. After the war, the P-61 was redesignated as the F-61, and served in the United States Air Force (USAF) as a long-range, all-weather, day/night interceptor for Air Defense Command until 1948 and for the Fifth Air Force until 1950. The last aircraft was retired from government service in 1954.

On the night of 14 August 1945, a P-61B of the 548th Night Fighter Squadron named Lady in the Dark was unofficially credited with the last Allied air victory before VJ Day. The P-61 was also modified to create the F-15 Reporter photo-reconnaissance aircraft for the USAAF and subsequently the USAF.

== Development ==
=== Origins ===
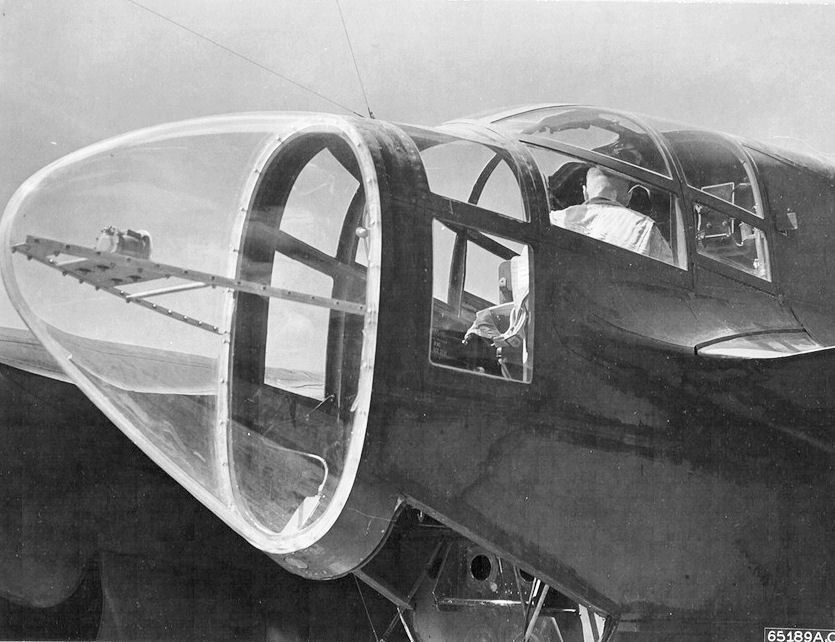
The P-61 radar operator occupied a separate compartment in the rear of the fuselage accessed from a hatch below.

In August 1940, about 16 months before the U.S. entered the war, the U.S. Air Officer in London, Lieutenant General Delos C. Emmons, was briefed on British research in radar ("radio detection and ranging", as it was then known), which had been underway since 1935, and had played an important role in the nation's defense against the Luftwaffe during the Battle of Britain. General Emmons was informed of the new Airborne Intercept radar (AI radar), a self-contained unit that could be installed in aircraft and operated independently of ground stations. In September 1940, the Tizard Mission traded British research, including the cavity magnetron that would make self-contained interception radar installations practicable, for American production.

Simultaneously, the British Purchasing Commission tasked with evaluating U.S. aircraft declared its urgent need for a high-altitude, high-speed aircraft to intercept the Luftwaffe bombers attacking London at night. The aircraft would need to patrol continuously over the city throughout the night, requiring at least an eight-hour loiter capabilit, and would carry one of the early, heavy AI radar units and mount its specified armament in "multiple-gun turrets". The British conveyed the requirements for a new fighter to all of the aircraft designers and manufacturers with which it was working. Among those contacted by the British was Jack Northrop, who realized that the speed, altitude, fuel load, and multiple-turret requirements demanded a large aircraft with multiple engines.

General Emmons returned to the U.S. with details of the British night-fighter requirements and stated in his report that the design departments of the American aviation industry's firms could possibly produce such an aircraft. The Emmons Board developed basic requirements and specifications and handed them over to the Air Technical Service Command (ATSC) at Wright Field, Ohio, towards the end of 1940. After considering the two biggest challenges—the heavy weight of the AI radar and the very long (by fighter standards) loiter time of 8 hours minimum—the board, including Jack Northrop, realized the aircraft would need the considerable power and resulting size of twin engines and recommended such parameters. The U.S. had two twin-row radials of at least 46 liters' displacement in development since the late 1930s, the Double Wasp and the Duplex Cyclone. These engines had been airborne for their initial flight tests by the 1940/41 timeframe, and were each capable, with more development, of exceeding 2,000 hp (1,500 kW).

Vladimir Pavlecka, Northrop chief of research, was present on unrelated business at Wright Field. On 21 October 1940, Colonel Laurence Craigie of the ATSC phoned Pavlecka, explaining the U.S. Army Air Corps' (USAAC) specifications, but told him to "not take any notes, 'Just try and keep this in your memory!'" What Pavlecka did not learn was radar's part in the aircraft; Craigie described the then-top secret radar as a "device which would locate enemy aircraft in the dark" and which had the ability to "see and distinguish other airplanes". "The mission", Craigie explained, was "the interception and destruction of hostile aircraft in flight during periods of darkness or under conditions of poor visibility."

Pavlecka met with Jack Northrop the next day and gave him the USAAC specifications. Northrop compared his notes with Pavlecka's, saw the similarity between the USAAC's requirements and those issued by the RAF, and pulled out the work he had been doing on the British aircraft's requirements. He was already a month along, and a week later, Northrop pounced on the USAAC proposal.

On 5 November, Northrop and Pavlecka met at Wright Field with Air Materiel Command officers, and presented them with Northrop's preliminary design. The Douglas XA-26A night fighter proposal was the only competition; Northrop's design was selected.

=== Early stages ===
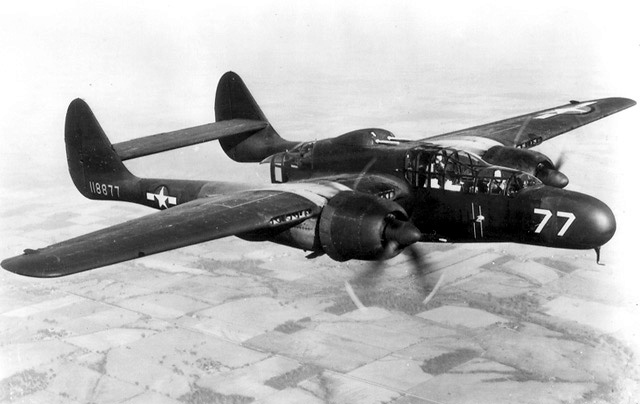
The YP-61 preproduction prototype

Following the USAAC acceptance, Northrop began comprehensive design work on what would become the first American dedicated night fighter. The result was the largest pursuit-class aircraft flown by the U.S. during the war.

Jack Northrop's first proposal was a long fuselage gondola between two engine nacelles and tail booms. The engines were Pratt & Whitney R-2800-10 Double Wasp 18-cylinder radials, producing 2,000 hp (1,500 kW) each. The fuselage housed the three-man crew, the radar, and two four-gun turrets. The .50 in (12.7 mm) AN/M2 Browning machine guns were fitted with 36 in (910 mm) long, lightweight "aircraft" barrels with perforated sleeves. The turrets were located in the nose and rear of the fuselage. It stood on tricycle landing gear and featured full-span retractable flaps, or "Zap flaps" (named after aircraft engineer Edward Zaparka), in the wings.

The aircraft was huge, as Northrop had anticipated. While far larger and heavier multiengined bombers existed, its 45.5 ft (14 m) length, 66 ft (20 m) wingspan, and projected 22,600 lb (10,251 kg) full-load weight were unheard of for a fighter, making the P-61 difficult for many to accept as a feasible fighter aircraft. (Note: The British high-altitude fighter, the Westland Welkin, had a 70 ft (21 m) wingspan, but an all up weight around 10,500 lb (4,800 kg))

=== Changes to the plan ===
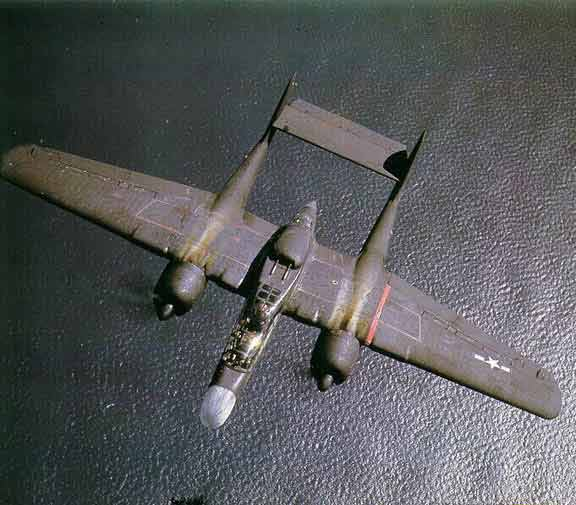
The P-61's upper turret is visible on the fuselage between the wings.

Some alternative design features were investigated before finalization. Among them were conversion to a single vertical stabilizer/rudder, the shifting of the nose and tail gun turrets to the top and bottom of the fuselage, and the incorporation of a second gunner.

Late in November 1940, Jack Northrop returned to the crew of three and twin tail/rudder assembly. To meet USAAC's request for more firepower, designers abandoned the ventral turret, and mounted four 20 mm (.79 in) Hispano M2 cannons in the wings. As the design evolved, the cannons were repositioned in the belly of the aircraft. Consequently, the P-61 became one of the few U.S.-designed fighter aircraft to have a quartet of 20 mm cannons—along with the NA-91 version of the Mustang, and the U.S. Navy's uprated F4U-1C Corsair—as factory-standard in World War II. (Note: Problems existed with the reliability of U.S. production of the British Hispano design, and this limited availability of the gun for use despite the intention of the U.S. Navy to change to 20 mm armament.)

On 5 December 1940, the Northrop Specification 8A was formally submitted to Army Air Materiel Command at Wright Field. Following a few small changes, Northrop's NS-8A fulfilled all USAAC requirements, and the Air Corps issued Northrop a letter of authority for purchase on 17 December. A contract for two prototypes and two scale models to be used for wind-tunnel testing (with costs not to exceed $1,367,000) was awarded on 10 January 1941. The War Department then designated the Northrop Specification 8A as the XP-61.

=== XP-61 development ===
In March 1941, the Army/Navy Standardization Committee decided to standardize use of updraft carburetors across all U.S. military branches. The XP-61, designed with downdraft carburetors, faced an estimated minimum two-month redesign of the engine nacelle to bring the design into compliance. The committee later reversed the updraft carburetor standardization decision (with the XP-61 program's predicament likely having little influence), thuss preventing a potential setback in the XP-61's development.

On 2 April 1941, the USAAC Mockup Board met at Northrop to inspect the XP-61 mock-up. They recommended several changes following this review. Most prominently, the four 20 mm M2 cannons were relocated from the outer wings to the belly of the aircraft, clustered tightly with the forward-facing ventral "step" in the fuselage to accommodate them being placed just behind the rear edge of the nose gear well. The closely spaced, centered installation, with two cannons stacked vertically, slightly outboard of the aircraft's centerline on each side, and the top cannon in each pair only a few inches farther outboard, eliminated the inherent drawbacks of the convergence of wing-mounted guns. Without convergence, aiming was considerably easier and faster, and the tightly grouped cannons created a thick stream of 20 mm projectiles. The removal of the guns and ammunition from the wings also cleaned up the wings' airfoil, and increased internal fuel capacity from 540 to 646 US gal (2,040 to 2,450 L; 450 to 538 imp gal).

Other changes included the provision for external fuel carriage in drop tanks, flame arrestors/dampers on engine exhausts, and redistribution of some radio equipment. While all beneficial from a performance standpoint (especially the relocation of the cannons), the modifications required over a month of redesign work, and the XP-61 was already behind schedule.

In mid-1941, the dorsal turret mount finally proved too difficult to install in the aircraft, and was changed from the General Electric ring mount to a pedestal mount like that used for the upper turrets in the Boeing B-17 Flying Fortress, Consolidated B-24 Liberator, North American B-25 Mitchell, Douglas A-20, and other American bombers. Following this modification, the turret itself became unavailable, as operational aircraft (in this case, the Boeing B-29 Superfortress) were ahead of experimental aircraft in line for the high-demand component. For flight testing, engineers used a dummy turret.

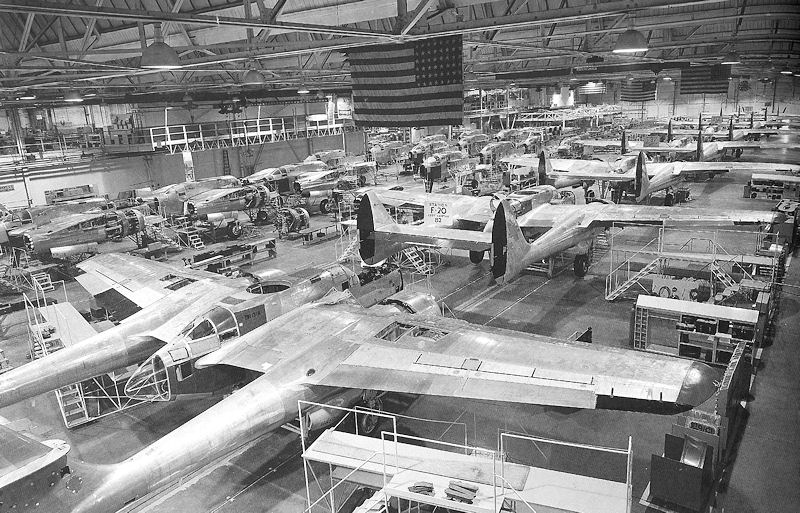
P-61Bs on the assembly line at Northrop (1944)

In February 1942, subcontracting manufacturer Curtiss notified Northrop that the C5424-A10 four-bladed, automatic, full-feathering propeller Northrop had planned for use in the XP-61 would not be ready for the prototype rollout or the beginning of flight tests. Hamilton Standard propellers were used instead of the Curtiss props until the originally planned component became available.

During the construction of the prototype, the XP-61's weight rose to 22,392 lb (10,157 kg) empty and 29,673 lb (13,459 kg) at takeoff. The XP-61s were then equipped with: R-2800-25S Double Wasp radial engines turning 12 ft 2 in (3.71 m) diameter Curtiss C5425-A10 four-blade propellers, both rotating counterclockwise when viewed from the front; two command radios, SCR-522As, and three other radio sets—the SCR-695A, AN/APG-1, and AN/APG-2; and central fire control for the gun turret similar to that used on the B-29, the General Electric GE2CFR12A3.

=== P-61C ===
The P-61C was a high-performance variant designed to rectify some of the combat deficiencies encountered with the A and B variants. Work on the P-61C proceeded quite slowly at Northrop because of the higher priority of the Northrop XB-35 flying wing strategic bomber project. In fact, much of the work on the P-61C was farmed out to Goodyear, which had been a subcontractor for production of Black Widow components.The first production P-61C-1-NO did not roll off the production lines until early 1945. As promised, the performance was substantially improved, in spite of a 2,000 lb (910 kg) increase in empty weight. This increase in performance came as a result of the new Pratt and Whitney R-2800-57, a new compound-charged engine. It increased power from 2200 to 2800 HP per engine, a combined total of 5600 HP. When used in conjunction with the R-2800-57 engines, the P-61C's supercharger and turbocharger also helped climbing rates and high-altitude power and efficiency, and allowed the P-61C to achieve higher altitudes. Maximum speed was 430 mph (690 km/h) at 30,000 ft (9,100 m), service ceiling was 41,000 ft (12,000 m), and an altitude of 30,000 ft (9,100 m) could be attained in 14.6 minutes.

The P-61C was equipped with perforated fighter airbrakes located both below and above the wing surfaces. These were to provide a means of preventing the pilot from overshooting his target during an intercept. For added fuel capacity, the P-61C was equipped with four underwing pylons (two inboard of the nacelles, two outboard) which could carry four 310 US gal (1,200 L; 260 imp gal) drop tanks. The first P-61C aircraft was accepted by the USAAF in July 1945. However, the war in the Pacific ended before any P-61Cs could see combat. The 41st and last P-61C-1-NO was accepted on 28 January 1946. At least 13 more were completed by Northrop, but were scrapped before they could be delivered to the USAAF.

Service life of the P-61C was quite brief, since its performance was being outclassed by newer jet aircraft. Most were used for test and research purposes. By the end of March 1949 most P-61Cs had been scrapped. Two entered the civilian market and two others went to museums.

=== F-15/RF-61C ===
In mid-1945, the surviving XP-61E was modified into an unarmed photographic reconnaissance aircraft. All of the guns were removed, and a new nose was fitted, capable of holding an assortment of aerial cameras. The aircraft, redesignated XF-15, flew for the first time on 3 July 1945. A P-61C was also modified to XF-15 standards. Apart from the turbosupercharged R-2800-C engines, it was identical to the XF-15 and flew for the first time on 17 October 1945. The nose for the F-15A was subcontracted to the Hughes Tool Company of Culver City, California. The F-15A was basically the P-61C with the new bubble-canopy fuselage and the camera-carrying nose, but without the fighter brakes on the wing.

=== F2T-1N ===
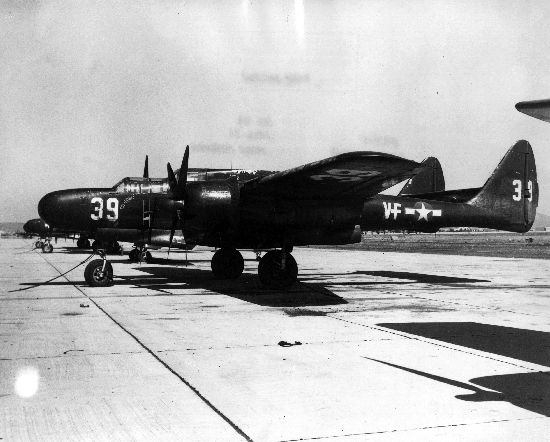
F2T-1Ns

The United States Marine Corps had planned to acquire 75 Black Widows, but these were canceled in 1944 in favor of the Grumman F7F Tigercat. In September 1945, however, the Marines received a dozen former Air Force P-61Bs to serve as radar trainers until the Tigercats would be available in squadron strength. Designated F2T-1N these aircraft were assigned to shore-based Marine units and served briefly, the last two F2T-1s being withdrawn on 30 August 1947.

== Design ==
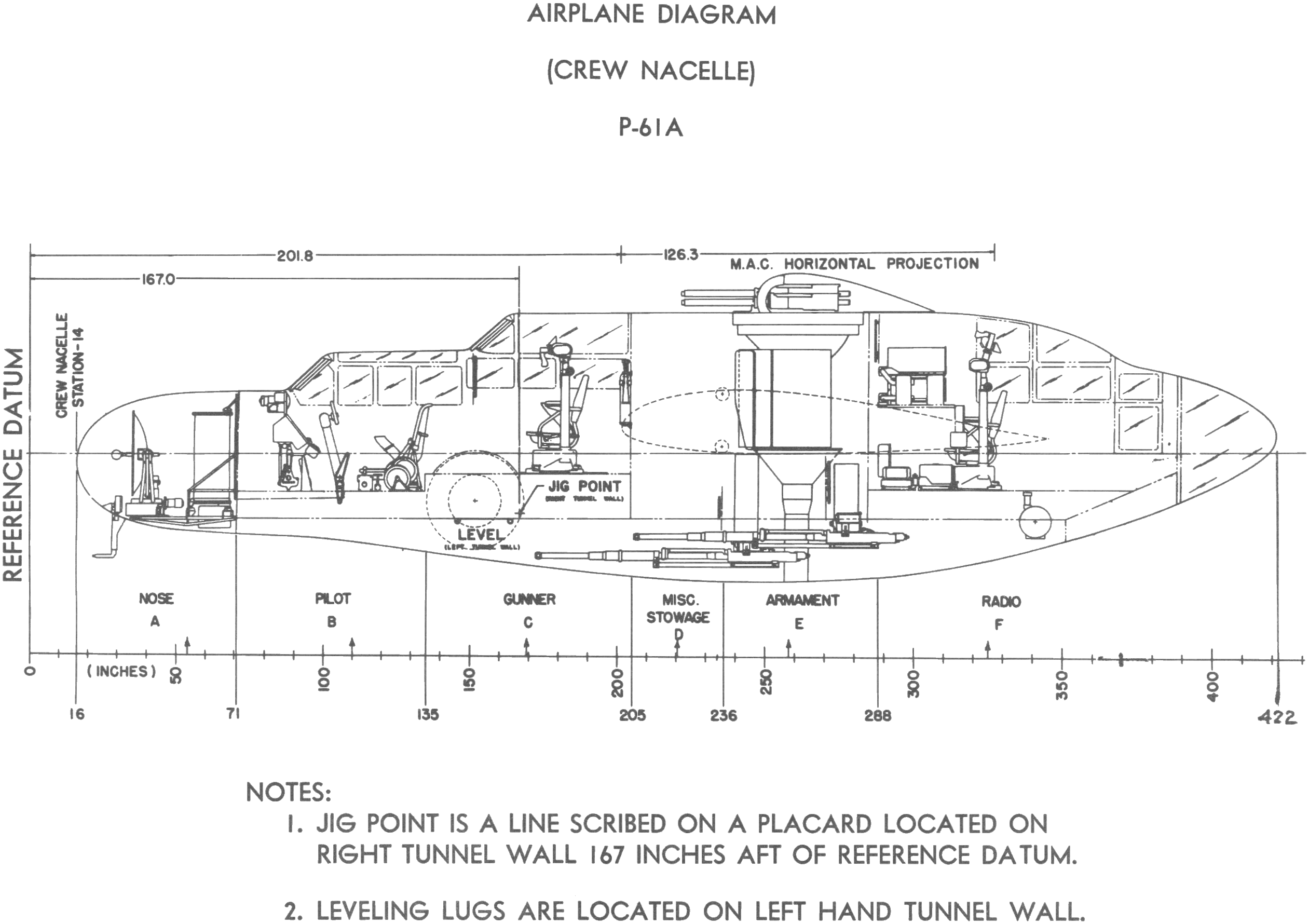
A cross section of the P-61A with labeled parts

The P-61 featured a crew of three - pilot, gunner, and radar operator. It was armed with four 20 mm (.79 in) Hispano M2 forward-firing cannons, mounted in the lower fuselage, and four .50 in (13 mm) M2 Browning machine guns lined up horizontally with the two middle guns slightly offset upwards in a remotely aimed, dorsally mounted turret, a similar arrangement to that used with the Boeing B-29 Superfortress using four-gun upper forward remote turrets. The turret was driven by the General Electric GE2CFR12A3 gyroscopic fire-control computer and could be directed by either the gunner or radar operator, who both had aiming control and gyroscopic collimator sight assembly posts attached to their swiveling seats.

The two Pratt & Whitney R-2800-25S Double Wasp engines were each mounted about one-sixth out on the wing's span. Two-stage, two-speed mechanical superchargers were fitted. To save space and weight, no turbosuperchargers were fitted, despite the expected 50 mph (80 km/h) speed and 10,000 ft (3,000 m) ceiling gains they would have provided.

Main landing-gear bays were located at the bottom of each nacelle, directly behind the engine. The two main gear legs were each offset significantly outboard in their nacelles and retracted towards the tail; oleo scissors faced forwards. Each main wheel was inboard of its gear leg and oleo. Main gear doors were two pieces, split evenly, longitudinally, hinged at inner door's inboard edge and the outer door's outboard edge.

Each engine cowling and nacelle drew back into tail booms that terminated upwards in large vertical stabilizers and their component rudders, each of a shape similar to a rounded right triangle. The leading edge of each vertical stabilizer was faired smoothly from the surface of the tail boom upwards, swept back to 37°. The horizontal stabilizer extended between the inner surfaces of the two vertical stabilizers and was roughly 3/4 of the chord of the wing root, including the elevator. The elevator spanned approximately 1/3 of the horizontal stabilizer's width, and in overhead plan view, angled inwards in the horizontal from both corners of the leading edge towards the trailing edge around 15°, forming the elevator into a wide, short trapezoid. The horizontal stabilizer and elevator assembly had a slight airfoil cross-section.

The engines and nacelles were outboard of the wing root and a short "shoulder" section of the wing with a 4° dihedral, and were followed by the remainder of the wing, which had a 2° dihedral. The leading edge of the wing was straight and perpendicular to the aircraft's centerline. The trailing edge was straight and parallel to the leading edge in the shoulder and tapered forward 15° outboard of the nacelle. Leading-edge updraft carburetor intakes were present on the wing shoulder and the root of the outer wing, with a few inches of separation from the engine nacelle itself. They were very similar in appearance to those on the F4U Corsair - thin, horizontal rectangles with the ends rounded out to nearly a semicircle, with multiple vertical vanes inside to direct the airstream properly.

The P-61 did not have normal-sized ailerons. Instead, it had small ailerons that allowed wider span flaps and a very low landing speed. These ailerons, known as guide ailerons, gave some roll control and provided acceptable feel for the pilot in rolling manoeuvers. Control of the aircraft about the roll axis was augmented with circular-arc spoilerons, which provided about half the roll control at low speeds and most of it at high speeds. The spoilers were located outboard of the nacelle in front of the flaps.

The main fuselage, or gondola, was centered on the aircraft's centerline. It was, from the tip of the nose to the end of the Plexiglas tail-cone, about 5/6 of the length of one wing (root to tip). The nose housed an evolved form of the SCR-268 Signal Corps Radar, the Western Electric Company's SCR-720A. Immediately behind the radar was the multiframed "greenhouse" canopy, featuring two distinct levels, one for the pilot and a second for the gunner above and behind him, the latter elevated by about 6 in (150 mm). Combined with the nearly flat upper surface of the aircraft's nose, the two-tiered canopy gave the aircraft's nose a distinct appearance of three wide, shallow steps. The forward canopy in the XP-61 featured contiguous, smooth-curved, blown-Plexiglas canopy sections facing forward, in front of the pilot and the gunner. The tops and sides were framed.

Beneath the forward crew compartment was the nose-gear wheel well, through which the pilot and gunner entered and exited the aircraft. The forward gear leg retracted to the rear, up against a contoured cover that when closed for flight formed part of the cockpit floor; the gear would not have space to retract with it open. The oleo scissor faced forward. The nosewheel was centered, with the strut forking to the aircraft's left. The nosewheel was about 3/4 of the diameter of the main wheels. Nose-gear doors were two pieces, split evenly longitudinally, and hinged at each outboard edge.

The center of the gondola housed the main wing spar, fuel storage and piping and control mechanisms, control-surface cable sections, propeller and engine controls, and radio/identification, friend or foe (IFF) equipment, but was predominantly occupied by the top turret mounting ring, rotation and elevation mechanisms, ammunition storage for the turret's machine guns, the GE2CFR12A3 gyroscopic fire-control computer, and linkages to the gunner and radar operator's turret control columns, forward and aft, respectively.

The radar operator's station was at the aft end of the gondola. The radar operator controlled the SCR-720 radar set and viewed its display scopes from the isolated rear compartment, which he entered by way of a small hatch with a built-in ladder on the underside of the aircraft. In addition to the radar systems themselves, the radar operator had intercom and radio controls, as well as the controls and sight for the remote turret. The compartment's canopy followed the curvature of the gondola's rear section, with only a single rounded step to the forward canopy's double step. The rear of the gondola was enclosed by a blown Plexiglas cap that tapered quickly in overhead plan view to a barely rounded point; the shape was somewhat taller in side profile than it was in overhead plan view, giving the end of the "cone" a rounded "blade" appearance when viewed in perspective.

The cross-section of the gondola, front to back, was generally rectangular, vertically oriented. The tip of the nose was very rounded to accommodate the main AI radar's dish antenna, merging quickly to a rectangular cross-section that tapered slightly towards the bottom. This cross-section lost its taper but became clearly rounded at the bottom moving back through the forward crew compartment and nose gear well. Height increased at both steps in the forward canopy, with the second step being flush with the top of the aircraft (not counting the dorsal gun turret). At the rear of the forward crew compartment, the cross-section's bottom bulged downwards considerably and continued to do so until just past the midpoint between the rear of the forward crew compartment and the front of the rear crew compartment, where the lower curvature began to recede. Beginning at the front of the rear crew compartment, the top of the cross-section began to taper increasingly inwards above the aircraft's center of gravity when progressing towards the rear of the gondola. The cross-section rounded out considerably by the downward step in the rear canopy, and rapidly became a straight-sided oval, shrinking and terminating in the tip of the blown-Plexiglas "cone" described above.

The cross-section of the nacelles was essentially circular throughout, growing then diminishing in size when moving from the engine cowlings past the wing and gear bay, towards the tail booms and the vertical stabilizers. A bulge on the top of the wing maintained the circular cross-section, as the nacelles intersected the wing. The cross-section became slightly egg-shaped around the main gear bays, larger at the bottom but still round. An oblong bulge on the bottom of the main gear doors, oriented longitudinally, accommodated the main wheels when the gear was retracted.

Wingtips, wing-to-nacelle joints, tips and edge of stabilizers, and control surfaces (excluding the horizontal stabilizer and elevator) were all smoothly rounded, blended or filleted. The overall design was exceptionally clean and fluid, as the aircraft possessed very few sharp corners or edges.

=== SCR-720 radar ===
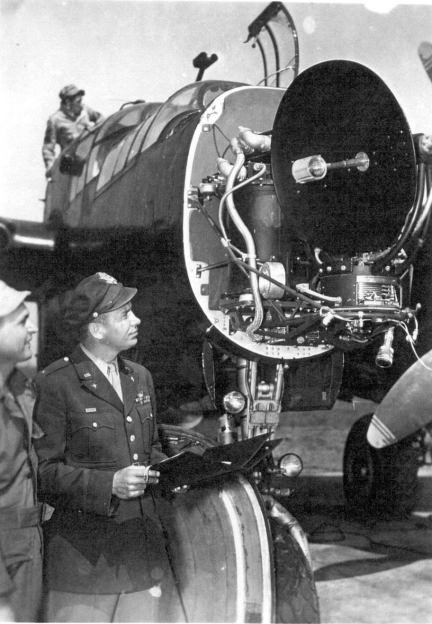
A P-61 radar

The production model of the SCR-720 mounted a scanning radio transmitter in the aircraft nose; in AI mode, it had a range of nearly 5 mi (8.0 km). The unit could also function as an airborne beacon/homing device, navigational aid, or in concert with interrogator-responder IFF units. The XP-61's radar operator located targets on his scope and steered the unit to track them, vectoring and steering the pilot to the radar target via oral instruction and correction. Once within range, the pilot used a smaller scope integrated into the main instrument panel to track and close on the target.

=== Remote turret ===
The XP-61's spine-mounted dorsal remote turret could be aimed and fired by the gunner or radar operator, who both had aiming control and gyroscopic collimator sighting posts attached to their swiveling seats, or could be locked forward to be fired by the pilot in addition to the 20 mm (.79 in) cannons. The radar operator could rotate the turret to engage targets behind the aircraft. Capable of a full 360° rotation and 90° elevation, the turret could be used to engage any target in the hemisphere above and to the sides of the XP-61. A brief assessment of the turret by the British Aeroplane & Armament Experimental Establishment in 1944 found problems with the aiming and "jerky movement" of the guns.

== Operational history ==
=== Training units ===
The first unit to receive production aircraft was the 348th Night Fighter Squadron at Orlando Army Air Base, Florida, which was responsible for training night-fighter crews.

=== European theater ===
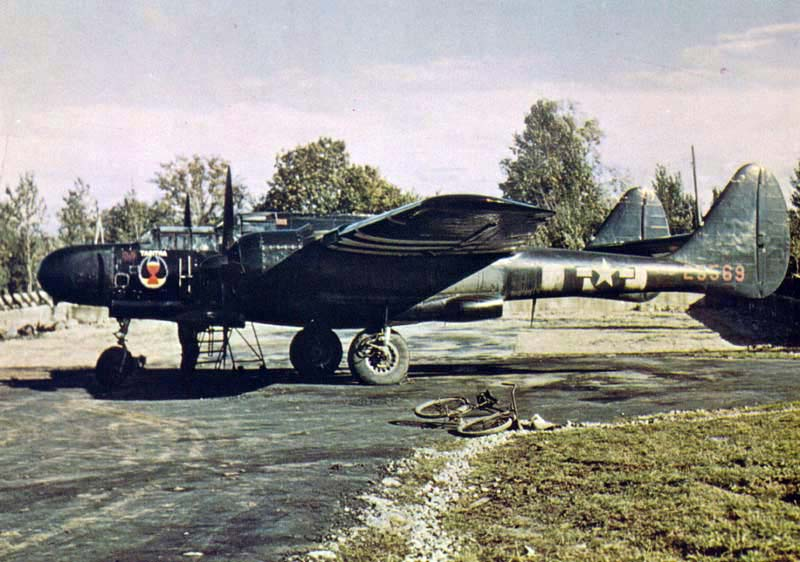
A P-61A of the 425th NFS (RAF Scorton, England)

The P-61 faced skepticism in the European theater due to concerns about its speed and ability to engage German aircraft, leading some U.S. generals to request alternative night fighters. The 422d Night Fighter Squadron was the first to complete its training in Florida, and in February 1944, the squadron was shipped to England aboard the RMS Mauretania. The 425th Night Fighter Squadron soon followed aboard the RMS Queen Elizabeth.

The situation deteriorated in May 1944, when the squadrons learned that several USAAF generals—including General Hoyt Vandenberg—believed the P-61 lacked the capability to successfully engage German fighters and bombers, being too slow. General Spaatz asked for de Havilland Mosquito night fighters to equip two U.S. night-fighter squadrons based in the UK. The request was denied due to insufficient supplies of Mosquitoes, which were in demand for a number of roles.

At the end of May, the USAAF insisted on a competition between the Mosquito and the P-61 for operation in the European theater. RAF crews flew the Mosquito Mk XVII, while crews from the 422nd NFS flew the P-61. In the end, the USAAF determined that the P-61 had a slightly better rate of climb and could turn more tightly than the Mosquito. Colonel Winston Kratz, director of night-fighter training in the USAAF, had organized a similar competition earlier. He said of the results:

I'm absolutely sure to this day that the British were lying like troopers. I honestly believe the P-61 was not as fast as the Mosquito, which the British needed because by that time it was the one airplane that could get into Berlin and back without getting shot down. I doubt very seriously that the others knew better. But come what may, the '61 was a good night fighter. In the combat game, you've got to be pretty realistic about these things. The P-61 was not a superior night fighter. It was not a poor night fighter. It was a good night fighter. It did not have enough speed.

On 5 July 1944, General Spaatz ordered a competition to be held between the P-61—using an example from the 422nd that had been "'tweaked' to get maximum performance" for the competition—against a Mosquito NF.XVII, and Lieutenant Colonel Kratz made a $500 bet in favor of the Mosquito being a faster and more maneuverable night-fighting platform. The "tweaked" P-61 confuted Kratz's bet, as according to the 422nd's squadron historian, it "... proved faster at all altitudes, outturned the Mossie at every altitude and by a big margin and far surpassed the Mossie in rate of climb."

In England, the 422d NFS finally received its first P-61s in late June and began flying operational missions over England in mid-July. These aircraft arrived without dorsal turrets, hence the squadron's gunners were reassigned to another squadron to continue flying the P-70. The first P-61 engagement in the European Theater occurred on 15 July when a P-61 piloted by Lieutenant Herman Ernst was directed to intercept a V-1 flying bomb. Diving from above and behind to match the V-1's 350 mph (560 km/h) speed, the P-61's plastic rear cone imploded under the pressure and the attack was aborted. The tail cones failed on several early P-61A models before this problem was corrected. On 16 July, Lieutenant Ernst was directed once more to intercept a V-1 and was successful. This gave the 422nd NFS and the European Theater its first P-61 kill.

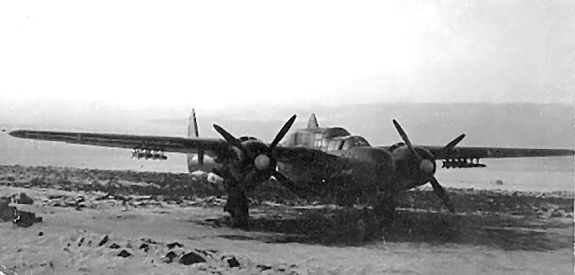
P-61 at Étain-Rouvres Air Base, France, with rockets mounted, c. 1944

In early August 1944, the 422nd NFS transferred to Maupertus, France, and began to encounter German aircraft for the first time. On the night of 14–15 August 1944, Impatient Widow, (Note: tail number 42-5591) attempted to intercept a Heinkel He 177A-5 of 5.Staffel/Kampfgeschwader 40, (Note: wing code (Geschwaderkennung) F8+AN, Werknummer 550 077) flown by Hptm. Stolle. Impatient Widow had its starboard engine shot out along with oil lines and hydraulics, and went down north of Barfleur, Normandy. The downing was witnessed by two other Heinkels.

However, a P-61 shot down a Messerschmitt Bf 110, and shortly afterwards, the squadron's commanding officer Lieutenant Colonel O. B. Johnson, his P-61 already damaged by antiaircraft ground fire, shot down a Focke-Wulf Fw 190. The 425th NFS scored its first kill shortly afterwards.

In October 1944, a P-61 of the 422nd NFS, now operating out of Advanced Landing Ground A-7 (Florennes) in Belgium, abandoned by the Luftwaffe in the German retreat, encountered a Messerschmitt Me 163 attempting to land. The P-61 tried to intercept it, but the rocket-powered aircraft was gliding too fast. A week later, another P-61 spotted a Messerschmitt Me 262 jet, but was also unable to intercept the jet. On yet another occasion, a 422nd P-61 spotted a Messerschmitt Me 410 Hornisse flying at tree-top level, but as the P-61 dove on it, the Horne" sped away and the P-61 was unable to catch it. Contrary to popular stories, no P-61 ever engaged in combat with a German jet or any of the late-war, advanced Luftwaffe aircraft.

The most commonly encountered and destroyed Luftwaffe aircraft types were Junkers Ju 188s, Junkers Ju 52s, Bf 110s, Fw 190s, Dornier Do 217s, and Heinkel He 111s, while P-61 losses were limited to numerous landing accidents, bad weather, friendly and antiaircraft ground fire. One researcher suggests 42-39515 may have been shot down by an Fw 190 of Nachtschlachtgruppe 9.

By December 1944, P-61s of the 422nd and 425th NFSs were helping to repel the German offensive known as the Battle of the Bulge, with two flying cover over the town of Bastogne. Pilots of the 422nd and 425th NFSs switched their tactics from night fighting to daylight ground attack, strafing German supply lines and railroads. The P-61's four 20 mm cannons proved effective in destroying German locomotives and trucks.

The 422nd NFS produced three ace pilots and two ace radar operators (radar operators and gunners shared kills with the pilot), while the 425th NFS officially claimed none. Lieutenant Cletus "Tommy" Ormsby of the 425th NFS was officially credited with three victories. Ormsby was killed by friendly fire moments after attacking two Junkers Ju 87 Stukas on the night of 24 March 1945. His radar operator escaped with serious injuries and was saved only by the quick actions of German surgeons. He later reported that they had successfully engaged and shot down both Ju 87s before being shot down themselves. This claim was corroborated by other 425th aircrew who were operating in the area at the time.

=== Mediterranean Theater ===
In the Mediterranean Theater, most night-fighter squadrons exchanged their aging Bristol Beaufighters for P-61s too late to achieve any kills in the Black Widow.

=== CBI Theater ===
P-61s of the China-Burma-India Theater were responsible for patrolling a larger area than any night-fighter squadrons of the war.

=== Pacific Theater ===
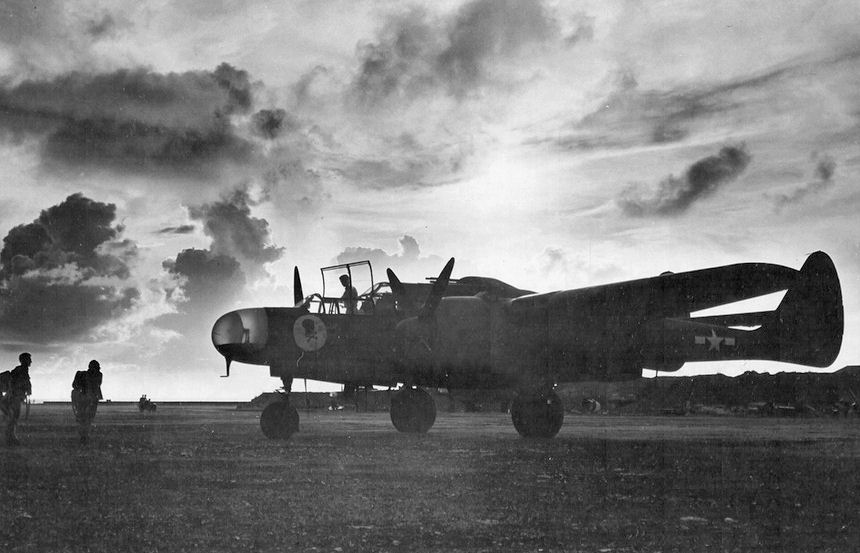
P-61A-1-NO Black Widow 42-5524, 6th Night Fighter Squadron, being readied for a mission, East Field, Saipan, Mariana Islands, September 1944

The 6th NFS based on Guadalcanal received its first P-61s in early June 1944. The aircraft were quickly assembled and underwent flight testing as the pilots changed from the squadron's aging P-70s. The first operational P-61 mission occurred on 25 June, and the type scored its first kill on 30 June 1944, when a Japanese Mitsubishi G4M "Betty" bomber was shot down.

In the summer of 1944, P-61s in the Pacific Theater saw sporadic action against Japanese aircraft. Most missions ended with no enemy aircraft sighted, but when enemy planes were detected, they were often in groups, with the attack resulting in several kills for that pilot and radar operator, who would jointly receive credit for the kill.

In the Pacific Theater in 1945, P-61 squadrons struggled to find targets. One squadron succeeded in destroying a large number of Kawasaki Ki-48 "Lily" Japanese Army Air Force twin-engined bombers, another shot down several Mitsubishi G4M "Bettys", while another pilot destroyed two Japanese Navy Nakajima J1N1 "Irving" twin-engined fighters in one engagement, but most missions were uneventful. Several Pacific Theater squadrons finished the war with no confirmed kills. The 550th could only claim a crippled B-29 Superfortress, shot down after the crew had bailed out and left the aircraft on autopilot.

On 30 January 1945, a lone P-61 performed a mission as part of the successful raid carried out by U.S. Army Rangers to free over 500 Allied prisoners of war held by the Japanese at the Cabanatuan prison camp (Camp Pangatian) in the Philippines. As the Rangers crept up on the camp, a P-61 swooped low and performed aerobatics for several minutes. The distraction of the guards allowed the Rangers to position themselves, undetected, within striking range of the camp.

Poet and novelist James Dickey flew 38 Pacific Theater missions as a P-61 radar operator with the 418th Night Fighter Squadron, an experience that influenced his work and for which he was awarded five Bronze Stars. The 418th NFS produced the only USAAF night-fighter aces in the Pacific, a pilot-radar operator team.

The last enemy aircraft destroyed in combat, one day after the Japanese surrender, was downed by a P-61B-2 named Lady in the Dark (s/n 42-39408) of the 548th NFS. The aircraft piloted by Lieutenant Lee Kendall and R/O Lieutenant John Scheerer on 14/15 August 1945 claimed a Nakajima Ki-44 "Tojo". The destruction of the "Tojo" came without a shot being fired; after the pilot of the "Tojo" sighted the attacking P-61, he descended to wave-top level and began a series of evasive maneuvers. These ended with his aircraft striking the water and exploding. Kendall and Scheerer were never officially credited with this kill, as it officially occurred nearly 24 hours after the cessation of the war, but he was put in for the Distinguished Flying Cross in recognition of his acts at the end of the war. Kendall's paperwork was lost, only to be discovered 45 years later; in December 1990, Kendall was awarded the Distinguished Flying Cross at March Airforce Base in California.

=== Credit for kills ===
Since pilots and radar operators did not always fly as a team, the kills of the pilot and radar operator were often different. On some occasions, a pilot or radar operator with only one or two kills would fly with a radar operator or pilot who was already an ace.

=== Summary ===
Though the P-61 proved itself capable against most German aircraft it encountered, it was outclassed by the new aircraft arriving in the last months of World War II. It also lacked external fuel tanks until the last months of the war, an addition that would have extended its range and saved many doomed crews looking for a landing site in darkness and bad weather. External bomb loads would also have made the type more suitable for the ground-attack role it soon took on in Europe. These problems were all addressed eventually, but too late to have the impact they might have had earlier in the war. The P-61 proved capable against all Japanese aircraft it encountered, but saw too few of them to make a significant difference in the Pacific war effort.

=== Postwar military service ===
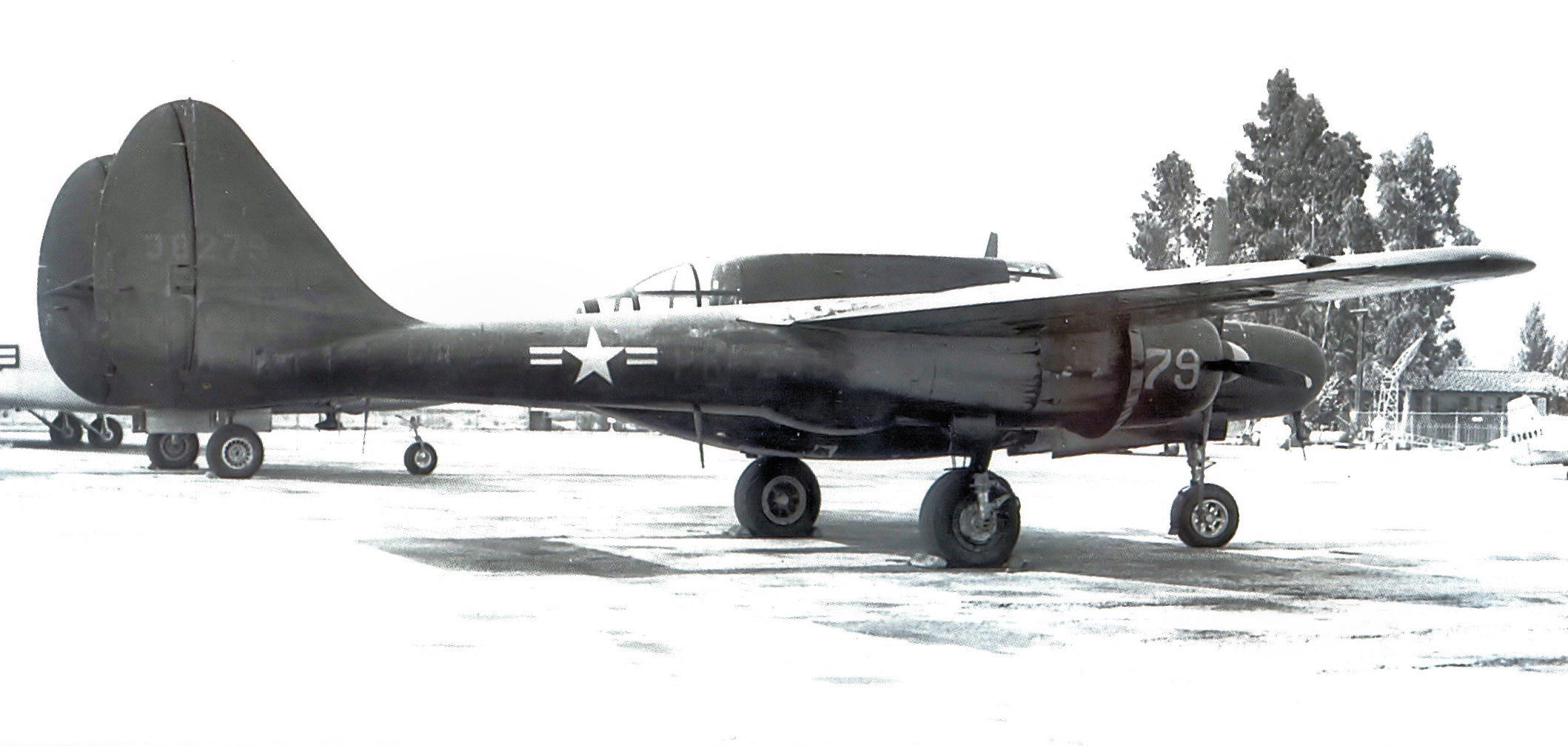
Air Defense Command 318th Fighter Squadron Northrop P-61B-20-NO Black Widow 43-8279, Hamilton Field, California, December 1947

The useful life of the Black Widow was extended for a few years into the immediate postwar period due to the USAAF's problems in developing a useful jet-powered night/all-weather fighter.

In Europe, the United States Air Forces in Europe was organized on 7 August 1945. Its night-fighter force was organized with the 415th NFS at AAF Station Nordholz on 2 October, the 417th NFS at AAF Kassel-Rothwesten on 20 August, and the 416th NFS at AAF Station Hörsching, Austria. The 414th, 422nd, and 425th became nonoperational and their personnel were returned to the United States. The 414th's P-61s were transferred to the 416th which was equipped with British de Havilland Mosquitos. High-hour aircraft were scrapped and P-61s in excess of operational needs were mothballed at the Erding Air Depot, Germany. All of these units were inactivated by the end of 1946, with personnel and most aircraft being assigned to the 52d Fighter Group. Excess and mothballed Black Widows at Erding were sent to reclamation at Oberpfaffenhofen Air Depot near Munich.

In the Pacific, the 426th, 427th, 548th, and 550th NFS were inactivated by the end of 1945. As part of the Occupation force in Japan, the 418th and 547th NFS were transferred from Okinawa and Ie Shima to Atsugi Airfield, Japan, and the 421st NFS was reassigned from Ie Shima to Itazuke Airfield, Japan. The 6th, 418th, and 421st were all inactivated, and their personnel and aircraft were consolidated under the 347th Fighter Group in February 1947. They became the 339th, 4th, and 68th Fighter Squadrons, respectively. The 419th in the Philippines and the 449th on Guam were both inactivated. Many P-61s in the Pacific that were deemed "war weary" met their fate at reclamation facilities established on Luzon.

P-61s returned to the United States that were considered still operational were organized and allocated to the three new major commands established by the 21 March 1946 USAAF reorganization. All of these CONUS-based commands were allocated squadrons that were nonoperational and had to be manned and equipped.

The Strategic Air Command 57th and 58th Reconnaissance Squadrons (Weather) were assigned P-61s. They had been initially part of Third Air Force, Continental Air Forces, and were equipped with early-model P-61Bs that had been used for training pilots in California before being reassigned to Rapid City Army Air Base, South Dakota. Under the Third Air Force, they were engaged in weather reconnaissance training immediately after the war, but the rapid demobilization of the USAAF led to the 57th being inactivated by the end of the year, and 58th followed suit in May 1946.

The Tactical Air Command was assigned the 415th NFS, and the Air Defense Command was assigned the 414th and 425th NFS. The 414th was almost immediately transferred to TAC. Both the 414th and 415th were equipped and manned at Shaw Field, South Carolina, and by early 1947 were operationally ready. The 414th was deployed to the Caribbean Air Command for defense of the Panama Canal, and the 415th was deployed to Alaskan Air Command for long-range air defense against Soviet aircraft stationed across the Bering Sea in Siberia. Both of these squadrons were soon transferred to the overseas commands by TAC, and were redesignated as fighter squadrons.

The Air Defense Command organized its Black Widow units with the 425th NFS being reassigned to McChord Field, Washington, and the new 318th Fighter Squadron to Mitchel Field, New York, in May 1947. A month later, the 52d Fighter Group (with the 2nd and 5th Fighter Squadrons) were returned from Germany. With the 52d operational, the 325th Fighter Group at McChord was reassigned to Hamilton Field, near San Francisco, with the 317th and 318th squadrons. All of these squadrons were equipped with P-61Bs drawn from storage depots in the southwest. With the change in the USAF's aircraft designation system in June 1948, all P-61s became F-61s and all F-15As became RF-61Cs. Buzz letters "FH" were assigned.

=== Ejection seat experiments ===
Shortly after the war, a Black Widow was used in early American ejection seat experiments. Pioneered by the Luftwaffe, an ejection seat was first used in an emergency on 14 January 1942 when Luftwaffe test pilot Helmut Schenk escaped from a disabled Heinkel He 280 V1. Some American interest in ejection seats had arisen during the development of experimental pusher aircraft such as the Vultee XP-54, with the goal being to give the pilot at least some slim chance of clearing the tail assembly and the propeller of the aircraft in the case of an emergency. The development of high-speed jet-powered aircraft, though, made the development of practical ejection seats mandatory.

In August 1945, an ejection seat was "borrowed" from a captured German Heinkel He 162 and was installed in a Lockheed P-80 Shooting Star, but the single-seat P-80 was found to be unsuitable for these tests, so testing switched to a three-seat Black Widow; an ejection seat was fitted in the forward gunner's compartment of a P-61B-5-NO (serial number 42-39489). The aircraft was redesignated XP-61B for these tests (there having been no XP-61B prototype for the initial P-61B series). A dummy was used in the initial ejection tests, but on 17 April 1946, USAAF First Sergeant Lawrence Lambert volunteered for the first "live" test and was successfully ejected from a P-61B at a speed of 302 mph (486 km/h) at 7,800 ft (2,380 m). Lambert was awarded the Distinguished Flying Cross for his actions. With the ejection-seat concept having been proven feasible, newer jet-powered aircraft were brought into the program, and the XP-61B was reconverted to standard P-61B configuration.

=== Thunderstorm project ===
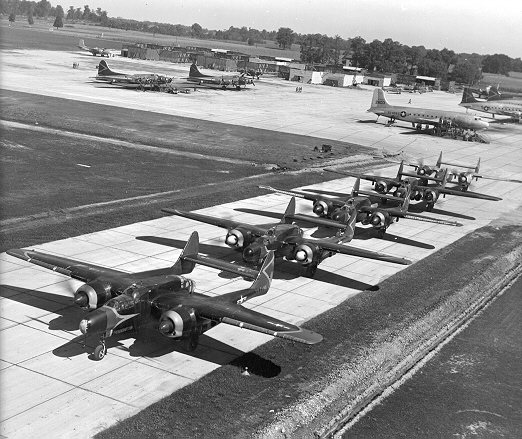
A P-61 squadron involved in the Ohio phase of the Thunderstorm Project, 1947

The P-61 was heavily involved in the Thunderstorm Project (1946–1949), a landmark effort to gather data on thunderstorm activity. The project was joint effort by four U.S. government agencies: U.S. Weather Bureau and the NACA (National Advisory Committee for Aeronautics, later to become NASA), assisted by the U.S. Army Air Forces (the U.S. Air Force, after 1947), and U.S. Navy. Scientists from several universities also helped launch, design, and conduct the project, which aimed to learn more about thunderstorms and how to better protect civilian and military airplanes from them. The P-61's radar and particular flight characteristics enabled it to find and penetrate the most turbulent regions of a storm, and return crew and instruments intact for detailed study.

The Florida phase of the project in 1946 continued into a second phase carried out in Ohio during the summer of 1947. Results derived from this pioneering field study formed the basis of the scientific understanding of thunderstorms, and much of what was learned has been changed little by subsequent observations and theories. Data were collected for the first time from systematic radar and aircraft penetration of thunderstorms, forming the basis of many published studies that are still frequently referenced by mesoscale and thunderstorm researchers.

=== Naval tests ===
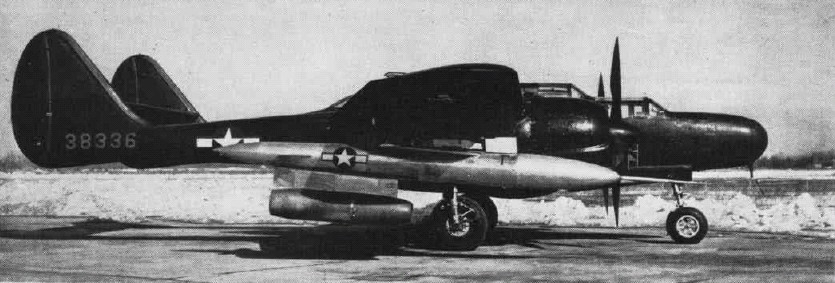
A P-61C with a PTV-N-2U Gorgon IV missile

P-61B-1-NO, AAF Serial Number 42-39458, was operated by the U.S. Navy at the Patuxent River test facility in Maryland in a number of tests. An additional P-61A-10-NO, AAF Serial Number 42-39395, was subjected by the Navy to a series of test catapult launches in an attempt to qualify the aircraft for shipboard launches, but the Black Widow was never flown from an aircraft carrier. These aircraft did not receive the naval designation F2T-1, but continued on as P-61s.

Shortly after the war, the Navy also borrowed two P-61Cs (AAF Ser. No. 43-8336 and AAF Ser. No. 43-8347) from the USAAF and used them for air launches of the experimental Martin PTV-N-2U Gorgon IV ramjet-powered missile, the first launch taking place on 14 November 1947. While carrying a Gorgon under each wing, the P-61C would go into a slight dive during launch to reach the speed necessary for the ramjet to start. These two naval Black Widows were returned to the USAF in 1948, and transferred to storage shortly afterwards.

During the war, the USAAC/AF tried to fly P-61s off of an aircraft carrier along the California coast in an attempt to mimic the success of the Doolittle Raid's North American B-25 Mitchell medium bombers. However, after those tests proved unsuccessful and with the ongoing Manhattan Project fulfilling its potential, this project was discontinued.

=== Retirement ===
In 1945, the USAAF set up a program for a jet night interceptor to replace the P-61. To meet the jet-powered night-fighter requirement, Curtiss-Wright proposed a conventional mid wing aircraft with four engines mounted midspan, but adapted specifically for the night fighter role. The company designation of Model 29A was assigned to the project. The Army ordered two prototypes under the designation XP-87 and the name "Blackhawk" was assigned. Northrop submitted their N-24, whose twin engines were faired into the lower sides of the fuselage. Two prototypes were ordered under the designation XP-89 in December 1946.

Delays in both the XP-89 and XP-87 projects meant problems for Black Widows still in service in 1947. They had been expected to be replaced by jets in only a few years and no plans for longer use had been made. The resulting parts shortage meant aircraft in service in late 1947 were being supported by cannibalization of other aircraft. In early 1948, the USAF ordered that a flyoff take place between the Northrop XF-89, Curtiss XF-87, and the Navy's Douglas XF3D-1 Skyknight. The evaluation team selected the XF-89 for production as being superior, and with the best development potential, while the F-87A program was cancelled on 10 October. F-89s finally reached USAF service in 1951.

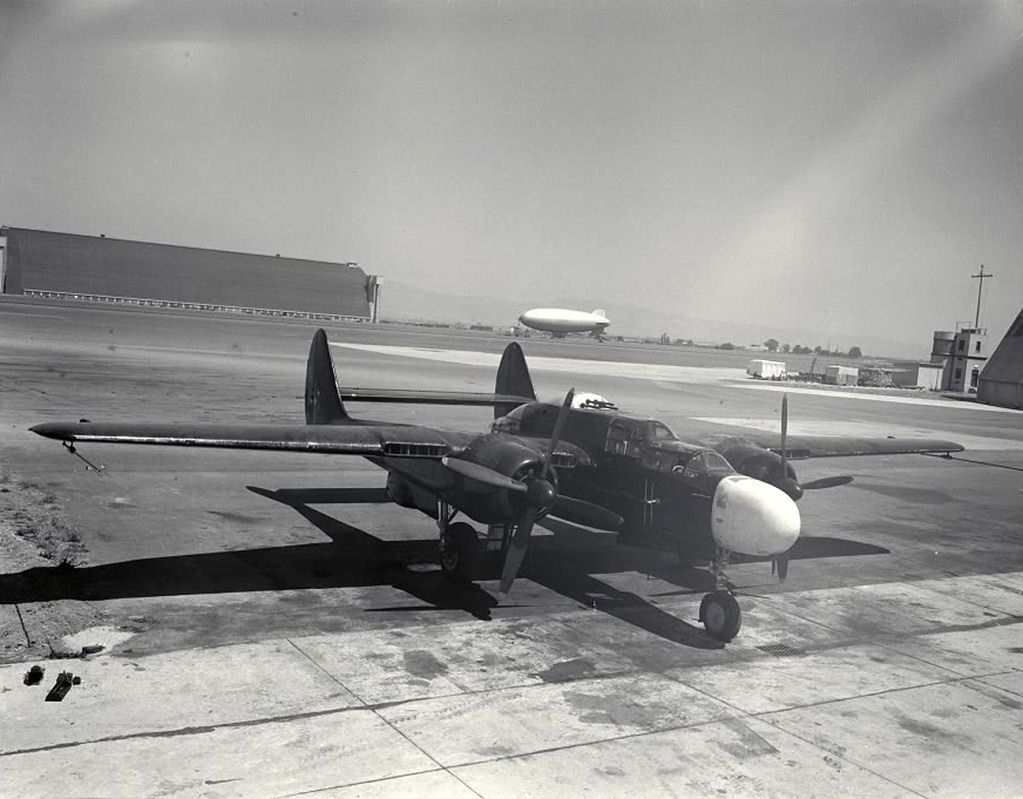
P-61 undergoing NACA testing at the NACA facility at NAS Moffett Field, California, 1948

An interim replacement was found with the North American F-82 Twin Mustang, whose engineless airframes were in storage at North American Aviation in California and could be put into service quickly. Replacement of the P-61 began in 1948 with F-82 night fighters, and by the end of the year all of the ADC Black Widows in the United States, Alaska and in Panama were off the inventory rolls. Most of Far East Air Force's P-61s were retired in 1949 and the last operational Black Widow, of the 68th Fighter Squadron, 347th Fighter Group left Japan in May 1950, missing the Korean War by only a month.

In 1948, the National Advisory Committee for Aeronautics (NACA) obtained a P-61C from Air Research and Development Command for a series of drop tests of swept-wing aerodynamic drones at Moffett Field, California. Many engineering data were obtained from these tests. An RP-61C, AF Ser. No. 45-59300, thus became the last operational USAF P-61 to be retired at the end of the NACA testing in 1953. A second P-61C (AF Ser. No. 43-8330), which was still flyable, was obtained from the Smithsonian Institution by NACA in October 1950 for these tests, and remained in use by NACA until 9 August 1954, being the last P-61 in government use. This aircraft is now on public display at the NASM's Steven F. Udvar-Hazy Center. P-61B-15-NO, AF Ser. No. 42-39754, was used by NACA's Lewis Flight Propulsion Laboratory in Cleveland, Ohio, for tests of airfoil-type ramjets. P-61C-1-NO, AF Ser. No. 43-8357, was used at Ames as a source for spare parts for other P-61 and RP-61 aircraft.

=== Civilian use ===
Surviving aircraft were offered to civilian governmental agencies or declared surplus and offered for sale on the commercial market. Five were eventually issued civilian registrations.

P-61B-1-NO, AAF Ser. No. 42-39419, had been bailed to Northrop during most of its military career, which then bought the aircraft from the government at the end of the war. Having the assigned civilian registration number NX30020, it was used as an executive transport, a flight-test chase plane, and atestbed with advanced navigational equipment. Later, it was purchased by the Jack Ammann Photogrammetric Engineers, a photo-mapping company based in Texas; then in 1963, it was sold to an aerial tanker company and used for fighting forest fires. It crashed while fighting a fire on 23 August 1963, killing its pilot.

== Variants ==
Designation	Changes from previous model
XP-61	The first two prototypes.
YP-61	Pre-production series; 13 built.
P-61A-1	First production version, R-2800-10 engines producing 2,000 hp (1,491 kW); 45 built, the last seven without the turret.
P-61A-5	No turret, R-2800-65 engines producing 2,250 hp (1,678 kW); 35 built.
P-61A-10	Water injection to increase duration of maximum power output; 100 built.
P-61A-11	One hardpoint under each wing for bombs or fuel tanks; 20 built.
P-61B-1	Nose stretched 8 in (20 cm), SCR-695 tail warning radar; 62 built.
P-61B-2	Reinstated underwing hardpoints as on P-61A-11; 38 built.
P-61B-10	Four underwing hardpoints; 46 built.
P-61B-11	Reinstated turret with two 0.50 in (12.7 mm) machine guns; five built.
P-61B-15	Turret with four 0.50 in (12.7 mm) machine guns; 153 built as largest production run of any P-61 version.
P-61B-16	Turret armament reduced to two machine guns; six built.
P-61B-20	New General Electric turret with four machine guns; 84 built.
P-61B-25	Turret automatically aimed and fired by the APG-1 gun-laying radar connected to an analogue computer; six built.
P-61C	Turbosupercharged (General Electric CH-5-A3) R-2800-73 engines producing 2,800 hp (2,088 kW), top speed increased to 430 mph (374 kn, 692 km/h) at 30,000 ft (9,145 m). However, the aircraft suffered from longitudinal instability at weights above 35,000 lb (15,875 kg) and from excessive takeoff runs—up to 3 mi (5 km) at a 40,000 lb (18,143 kg) takeoff weight; 41 built, 476 more cancelled after the end of the war.
TP-61C	P-61Cs converted to dual-control training aircraft.
XP-61D	One P-61A-5 (number 42-5559) and one P-61A-10 (number 42-5587) fitted with GE CH-5-A3 turbosupercharged R-2800-14 engines; cancelled when P-61C entered production.
XP-61E	Two P-61B-10s (numbers 42-39549 and 42–39557) converted to daytime long-range escort fighters. Tandem crew sat under a blown canopy which replaced the turret, additional fuel tanks were installed in place of the radar operator's cockpit in the rear of the fuselage pod, and four 0.50 in (12.7 mm) machine guns took place of the radar in the nose (the 20 mm/.79 in ventral cannon were retained as well). First flight 20 November 1944, cancelled after the war ended. The first prototype was converted to an XF-15, the second lost in take-off accident 11 April 1945.
XP-61F	Abandoned conversion of one P-61C to XP-61E standard.
P-61G	Sixteen P-61B converted for meteorological research.
F-15A Reporter	Photoreconnaissance variant with a new center pod with pilot and camera operator seated in tandem under a single bubble canopy, and six cameras taking place of radar in the nose. Powered by the same turbosupercharged R-2800-73 engines as the P-61C. The first prototype XF-15 was converted from the first XP-61E prototype, the second XF-15A was converted from a P-61C (number 43-8335). The aircraft had a takeoff weight of 32,145 lb (14,580 kg) and a top speed of 440 mph (382 kn, 708 km/h). Only 36 of the 175 ordered F-15As were built before the end of the war. After formation of the United States Air Force in 1947, F-15A was redesignated RF-61C. F-15As were responsible for most of the aerial maps of North Korea used at the start of the Korean War.
F2T-1N	Twelve USAAF P-61B's transferred to the United States Marine Corps.

All models and variants of the P-61 were produced at Northrop's Hawthorne, California, manufacturing plant.

== Operators ==
United Kingdom
One P-61A (42-5496) delivered for evaluation in March 1944; tested at Royal Aircraft Establishment, A&AEE and Central Fighter Establishment before returned to USAAF 1945.

United States

- United States Army Air Forces
- United States Air Force

=== Pacific Theater ===
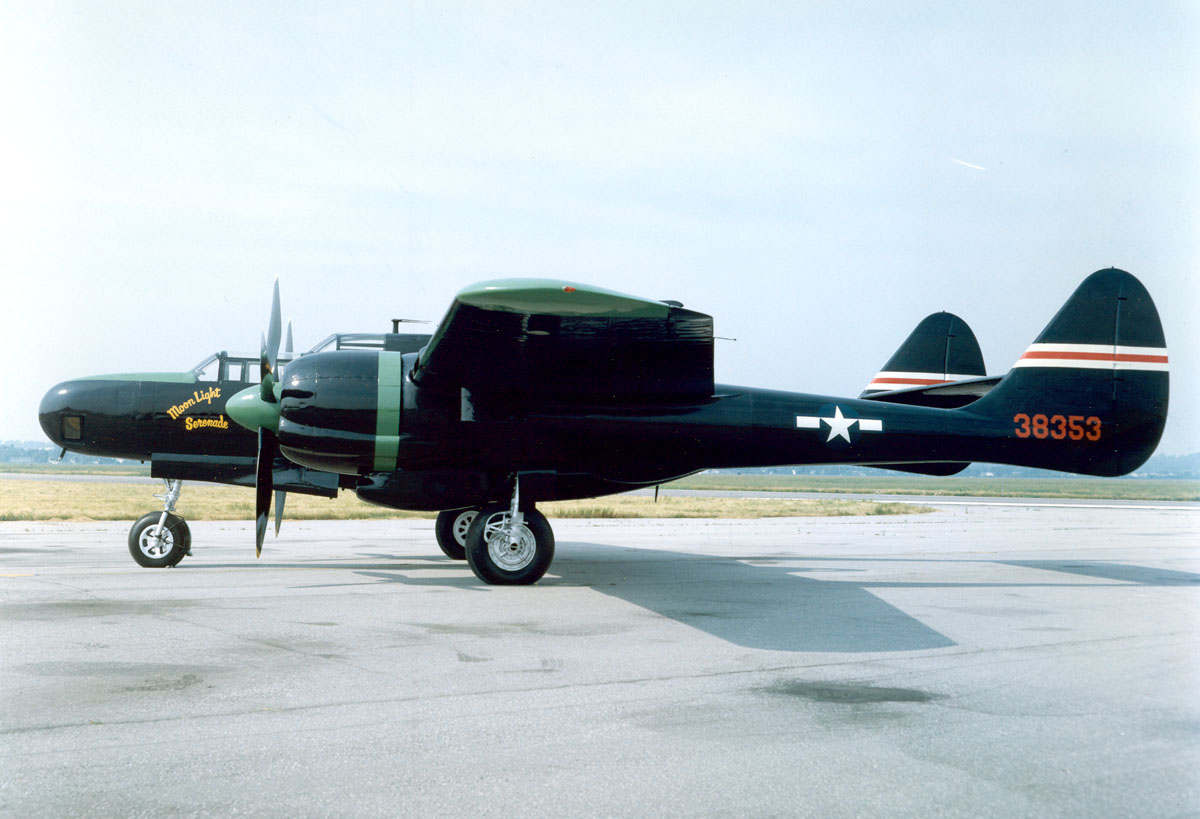
P-61C 42-8353 painted in the livery of 550th Squadron's Moonlight Serenade (was P-61B 42–39468) at the National Museum of the United States Air Force

- Fifth Air Force
  - 418th Night Fighter Squadron (April 1943 – February 1947). Deployed to Southwest Pacific, November 1943; received P-61s in September 1944 at Hollandia Airfield, NEI. Operated in Netherlands East Indies, Philippines, Okinawa. Inactivated on Okinawa. After inactivation personnel, equipment and aircraft assigned to 4th Fighter Squadron (All Weather).
  - 421st Night Fighter Squadron (May 1943 – February 1947). Deployed to Southwest Pacific, January 1944; received P-61s in June 1944 at Nadzab Airfield, PNG. Operated in Papua New Guinea, Netherlands East Indies, Philippines, Okinawa. Inactivated in Japan. After inactivation personnel, equipment and aircraft assigned to 68th Fighter Squadron (All Weather).
  - 547th Night Fighter Squadron (March 1944 – February 1946). Deployed to Southwest Pacific, September 1944; received P-61s in October 1944 at Owi Airfield, NEI. Operated in Netherlands East Indies, Philippines, Okinawa. Inactivated in Japan.
- Seventh Air Force
  - 6th Night Fighter Squadron (Formerly 6th Pursuit Squadron) (January 1943 – February 1947). Received P-61s in May 1944 at John Rogers Field, Hawaii Territory. Deployed to Mariana Islands, Central Pacific June 1944 – May 1945. Inactivated in Japan. After inactivation, personnel, equipment and aircraft assigned to 339th Fighter Squadron (All Weather).
  - 548th Night Fighter Squadron (April 1944 – December 1945). Received P-61s in September 1944 at Hickam Field, Hawaii Territory. Deployed to Central Pacific, December 1944. Operated in Saipan, Iwo Jima, Okinawa. Inactivated on Okinawa.
  - 549th Night Fighter Squadron (May 1944 – February 1946). Received P-61s in October 1944 at Kipapa Gulch Airfield, Hawaii Territory. Deployed to Central Pacific, February 1945. Operated in Saipan, Iwo Jima, Okinawa. Inactivated on Guam.
- Thirteenth Air Force
  - 419th Night Fighter Squadron (April 1943 – February 1947). Deployed to South Pacific, February 1943; received P-61s in May 1944 at Buka Airfield, Bougainville, Solomon Islands. Operated in Solomon Islands, Admiralty Islands, Netherlands East Indies, New Guinea, Philippines. Inactivated in Philippines.
  - 550th Night Fighter Squadron (June 1944 – January 1946). Deployed to South Pacific, December 1944; received P-61s in January 1945 at Middleburg Airfield, NEI. Operated in Netherlands East Indies, Philippines. Inactivated in Philippines.

=== European Theater ===
- Ninth Air Force

422d Night Fighter Squadron (August 1943 – September 1945). Deployed to ETO, March 1944; received P-61s in May 1944 at RAF Scorton, England. Operated in England, France, Belgium, Germany. Inactivated in France.

425th Night Fighter Squadron (December 1943 – August 1947). Deployed to ETO, March 1944; received P-61s in June 1944 at RAF Scorton, England. Operated in England, France, Germany. Inactivated in France.

- Twelfth Air Force

414th Night Fighter Squadron (January 1943 – September 1947). Deployed to MTO, May 1943; received P-61s in December 1944 at Pontedera Airfield, Italy. Operated in Algeria, Sardinia, Corsica, Italy, plus detachment to Belgium. Reassigned to Shaw AAF, South Carolina, 15 August 1946 and inactivated 16 March 1947. Personnel and aircraft were reassigned to the 319th Fighter Squadron (All Weather) and flown to Rio Hato AB, Panama.

415th Night Fighter Squadron (February 1943 – September 1947). Deployed to MTO, May 1943; received P-61s in May 1945 at Braunshardt Airfield (Y-72), Germany. Operated in Algeria, Italy, Corsica, France, Germany. Reassigned to Shaw AAF, South Carolina, 13 July 1946 and reassigned to Alaskan Air Command, 19 May 1947. Inactivated on 1 September 1947, personnel and aircraft assigned to Alaskan Air Command 449th Fighter Squadron (All Weather).

416th Night Fighter Squadron (February 1943 – November 1946). Deployed to ETO, May 1943; MTO, August 1943. Received P-61s in September 1944 at Rosignano Airfield, Italy. Operated in Italy, Corsica, France, Germany. Inactivated 9 November 1946 and personnel, equipment and aircraft assigned to 2d Fighter Squadron (All Weather).

417th Night Fighter Squadron (February 1943 – November 1946). Deployed to ETO, May 1943; MTO, August 1943. Received P-61s in September 1944 at Borgo Airfield, Corsica. Operated in England, Algeria, Tunisia, Corsica, France, Germany. Inactivated 9 November 1946 and personnel, equipment and aircraft assigned to 5th Fighter Squadron (All Weather).

427th Night Fighter Squadron (February 1944 – October 1945). Deployed to MTO, August 1944; received P-61s in August 1944 at Payne Airfield, Egypt. Was designated for assignment to Poltava Airfield, Ukraine on the Eastern Front, for night defense of USAAF airfields as part of the Operation Frantic shuttle bombing missions. When the Soviets did not allow USAAF night fighters to defend the Ukraine bomber bases, the squadron flew some missions from Pomigliano Airfield, Italy, then was reassigned to Tenth Air Force in China–Burma–India Theater.

=== China–Burma–India Theater ===
- Tenth Air Force/Fourteenth Air Force

426th Night Fighter Squadron (January 1944 – November 1945). Deployed to CBI, June 1944; received P-61s in September 1944 at Madhaiganj Airfield, India. Operated briefly from India (10th AF), but moved to China (14th AF) in October where it operated until September 1945. Inactivated in India, October 1945.

427th Night Fighter Squadron (February 1944 – October 1945). Reassigned to CBI from Twelfth Air Force in Italy in October 1944; equipped with P-61s. Flights of aircraft operated from widely dispersed airfields in India and Burma (10th AF), and China (14th AF). Squadron consolidated in India and inactivated, September 1945.

=== Training units ===
- 481st Night Fighter Operational Training Group

Formed on 1 July 1943 at Orlando Army Air Base, Florida from elements of the Army Air Force School of Applied Tactics (AAFSAT) Fighter Command School 50th Pursuit Group.
Reassigned to IV Fighter Command, Hammer Army Airfield, California, 1 January 1944.
Disbanded 31 March 1944, replaced by 450th Army Air Forces Base Unit under Fourth Air Force 319th Wing.
School inactivated on 31 August 1945.

Training Squadrons:
348th Night Fighter Squadron (OTU)
349th Night Fighter Squadron (OTU)
420th Night Fighter Squadron (RTU)
424th Night Fighter Squadron (RTU)

=== Postwar P-61 squadrons ===
Note: The P-61 (Pursuit) designation of the Black Widow was changed to F-61 (Fighter) on 11 June 1948.

- Air Defense Command

- 2d Fighter Squadron. Formed from equipment and personnel of 416th Night Fighter Squadron in November 1946 at AAF Station Schweinfurt, Germany.
- Assigned to 52d Fighter Group at Mitchel Army Airfield, New York, in June 1947. Transitioned to F-82 Twin Mustangs at McGuire Air Force Base, New Jersey, in October 1949.

- 5th Fighter Squadron. Formed from equipment and personnel of 417th Night Fighter Squadron in November 1946 at AAF Station Schweinfurt, Germany.
- Assigned to 52d Fighter Group at Mitchel Army Airfield, New York, in June 1947. Transitioned to F-82 Twin Mustang at McGuire Air Force Base, New Jersey, in October 1949.

- 317th Fighter Squadron. Assigned to 325th Fighter Group at Mitchel Army Airfield, New York, in May 1947 and assigned P-61s. Reassigned to Hamilton Army Airfield, California, in November 1947. Reassigned to Moses Lake Air Force Base, Washington, in November 1948, where it transitioned to F-82 Twin Mustangs.

- 318th Fighter Squadron. Assigned to 325th Fighter Group at Mitchel Army Airfield, New York, in May 1947 and assigned P-61s. Reassigned to Hamilton Army Airfield, California, in December 1947. Transitioned to F-82 Twin Mustangs in May 1948.

- Caribbean Air Command

- 319th Fighter Squadron. Formed from equipment and personnel of 414th Night Fighter Squadron. Ground echelon of unit formed at Rio Hato Army Air Base, Panama, in March 1947; air echelon acquired P-61 aircraft at Shaw Field, South Carolina, and flew them to Panama for air defense of the Panama Canal. Assigned to 6th Fighter Wing. Squadron was subsequently reassigned to France Air Force Base, Panama Canal Zone in January 1948. Transitioned to F-82 Twin Mustangs in December 1948.

- Alaskan Air Command

- 449th Fighter Squadron. Formed from equipment and personnel of 415th Night Fighter Squadron at Adak Army Air Field, Aleutian Islands, Alaska, on 1 September 1947. Later transitioned to F-82 Twin Mustang in December 1948.

- Far East Air Force

- 4th Fighter Squadron. Formed from equipment and personnel of 418th Night Fighter Squadron in August 1948 at Naha Air Base, Okinawa. Assigned to 347th Fighter Group. Transitioned to F-82 Twin Mustang in September 1948.

- 68th Fighter Squadron. Formed from equipment and personnel of 421st Night Fighter Squadron in August 1948 at Bofu Air Base, Japan. Assigned to 347th Fighter Group. Transitioned to F-82 Twin Mustangs in February 1950.

- 339th Fighter Squadron. Formed from personnel and equipment of 6th Night Fighter Squadron in February 1947 at Johnson Air Base Japan. Assigned to 347th Fighter Group. F-82 Twin Mustangs assigned in February 1950. Note: The 339th was the last USAF squadron equipped with F-61s, the last aircraft being sent to reclamation at Tachikawa Air Base, Japan, in May 1950.

- 8th Photographic Reconnaissance Squadron. Flew F-15A (RF-61C) Reporter (1947–1949) from Johnson Air Base, Japan. Aircraft reassigned to 82d Tactical Reconnaissance Squadron until inactivated on 1 April 1949

- Continental Air Forces

- 57th Reconnaissance Squadron and 58th Reconnaissance Squadron. Performed Weather Reconnaissance training at Rapid City Army Air Base, South Dakota (July 1945 – January 1946).

== Surviving aircraft ==
Four P-61s are known to survive today.

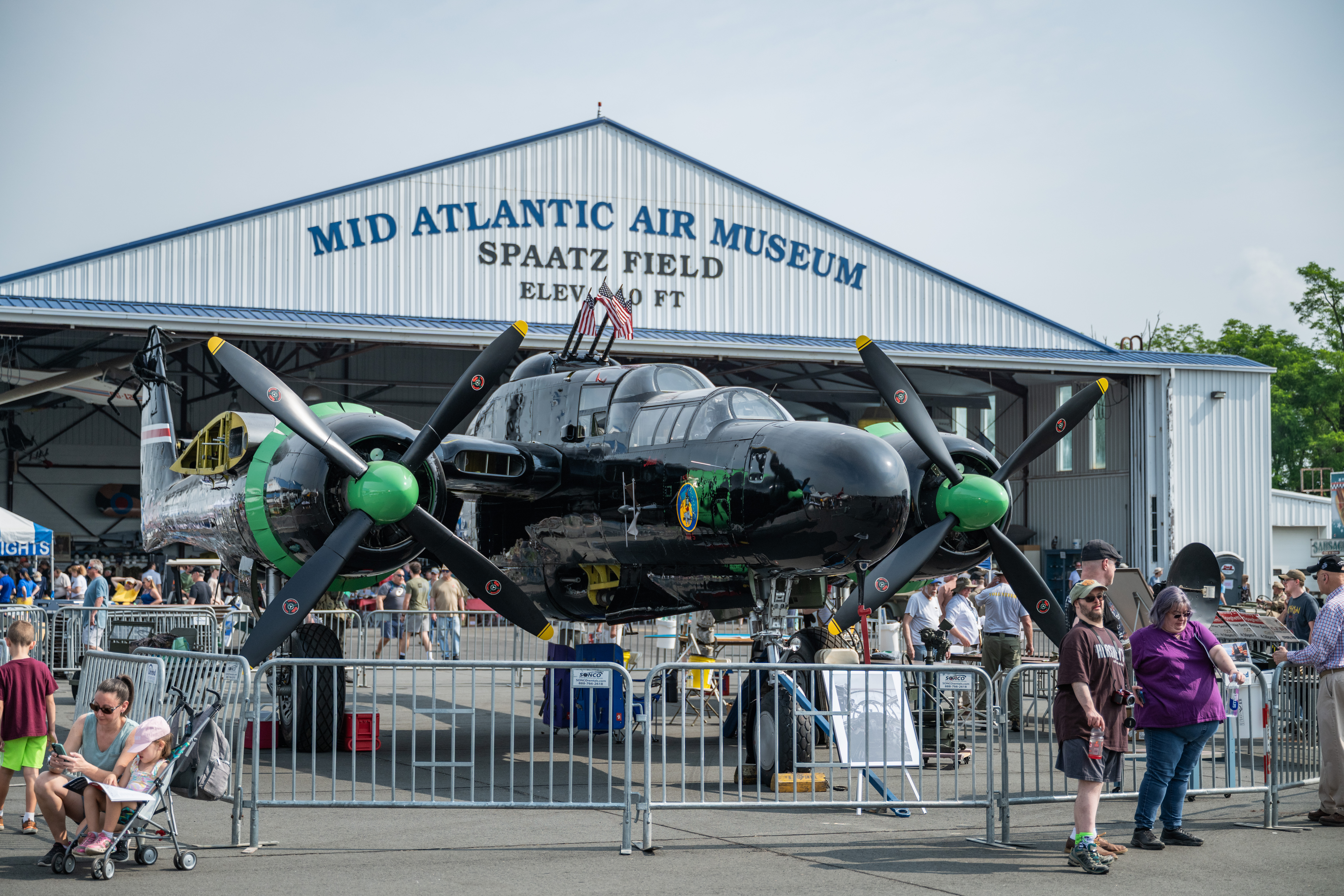
P-61B-1-NO (AAF Ser. No. 42-39445) on display at the Mid-Atlantic Air Museum's 34th Annual WWII Weekend

P-61B-1-NO c/n 964 AAF Ser. No. 42-39445 "Moonbeam Dream" is under restoration to flying status by the Mid-Atlantic Air Museum in Reading, Pennsylvania. The aircraft crashed on 10 January 1945 on Mount Cyclops in Papua (province), Indonesia and was recovered in 1989 by the museum staff. The aircraft has been undergoing a slow restoration since then with the intention of eventually returning it to flying condition, with the civilian registration N550NF. When finished, it is expected it will be over 70% new construction. By May 2011, 80% of the restoration had been completed, with only the installation of the wings and engines remaining. In June 2019, both engines had been overhauled and two brand new props had been hung. In July 2023, most of the major restoration work has been completed with the installation of wiring harnesses, control cables, oxygen tanks, and other components. The elevator has been completed, but due to limited hangar space it has not yet been installed. Work continues on the rudders and outer wings which, with the addition of newly built spars, consist mostly of new build components. The aircraft reached another milestone in June 2024 when the museum unveiled the fully painted aircraft during their annual WWII Weekend event. Later that summer, the museum unveiled the aircraft's first ever nose art, thus naming it "Moonbeam Dream."

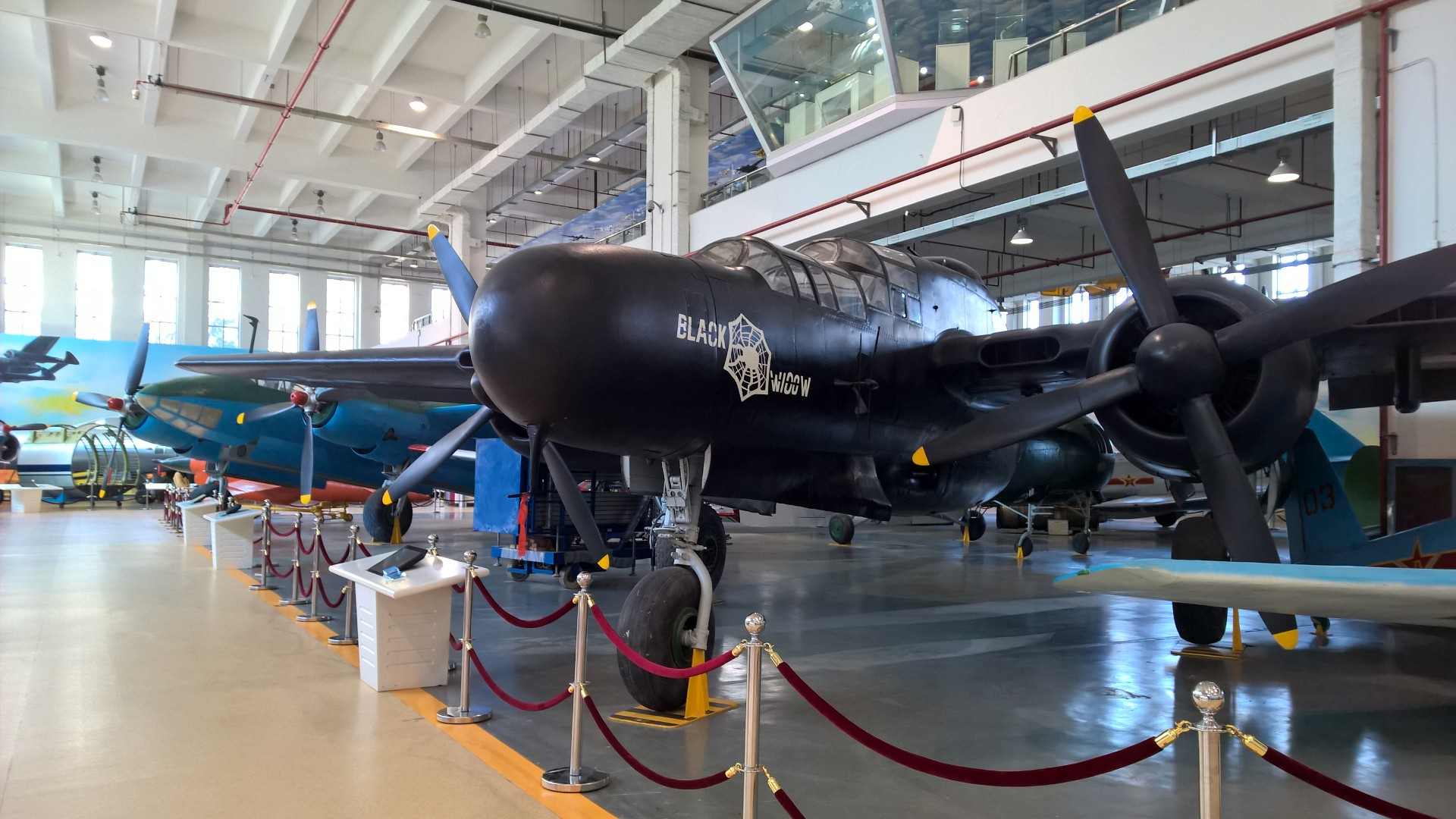
P-61B inside the Beijing Air and Space Museum.

P-61B-15-NO c/n 1234 AAF Ser. No. 42-39715 is on static display inside the Beijing Air and Space Museum at Beihang University in Beijing, China. This aircraft was manufactured by Northrop Aircraft, Hawthorne, California, and accepted by the USAAF on 5 February 1945. It was sent to Newark, New Jersey, on 16 February 1945 and departed the US ten days later for the China Burma India Theater. It was then assigned to the Tenth Air Force, being allotted to the 427th Night Fighter Squadron on 3 March 1945. At the end of the war the Communist Chinese came to one of the forward airfields in Sichuan Province and ordered the Americans out, but instructed them to leave their aircraft. It has been reported that there had been three P-61s taken and sometime later the Chinese wrecked two of them. It was stricken off charge by the USAAF on 31 December 1945 and turned over to the Chengdu Institute of Aeronautical Engineering in 1947. When the institute moved to its present location, it did not take this aircraft with them, instead shipping it to BUAA (then called Beijing University of Aeronautics and Astronautics) in 1954 where it was placed on outside display with other aircraft as part of a museum. Sometime in 2008–09 the museum closed and the display aircraft were moved to a parking lot approximately 200 meters south. The outer wing sections were removed during this transfer. It was confirmed in September 2012 that the museum's display aircraft were no longer at the parking lot. By April 2013 the P-61 had been reassembled and repainted in the new BASM building with the other aircraft that were previously outside.

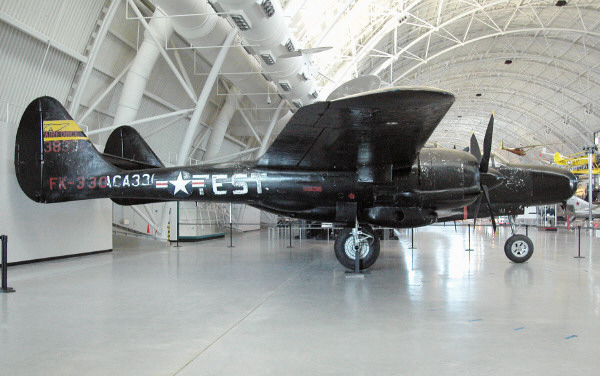
P-61C at the National Air & Space Museum, showing three layers of original markings.

P-61C-1-NO c/n 1376 AF Ser. No. 43-8330, is on display at the Steven F. Udvar-Hazy Center of the National Air and Space Museum in Chantilly, Virginia. The aircraft was delivered to the USAAF on 28 July 1945. By 18 October, it was flying at Ladd Field, in Alaska conducting cold weather tests, where it remained until 30 March 1946. The aircraft was later moved to Pinecastle AAF in Florida for participation in the National Thunderstorm Project. Pinecastle AAF personnel removed the guns and turret from 43-8330 in July 1946 to make room for new equipment. In September the aircraft moved to Clinton County Army Air Base in Ohio, where it remained until January 1948. The Air Force then reassigned the aircraft to the Flight Test Division at Wright-Patterson Air Force Base in Dayton, Ohio. After being declared surplus in 1950 it was donated by the U.S. Air Force to the National Air Museum in Washington, D.C. (which became the National Air and Space Museum in 1966).

On 3 October 1950, the P-61C was transferred to Park Ridge, Illinois, where it was stored along with other important aircraft destined for eventual display at the museum.

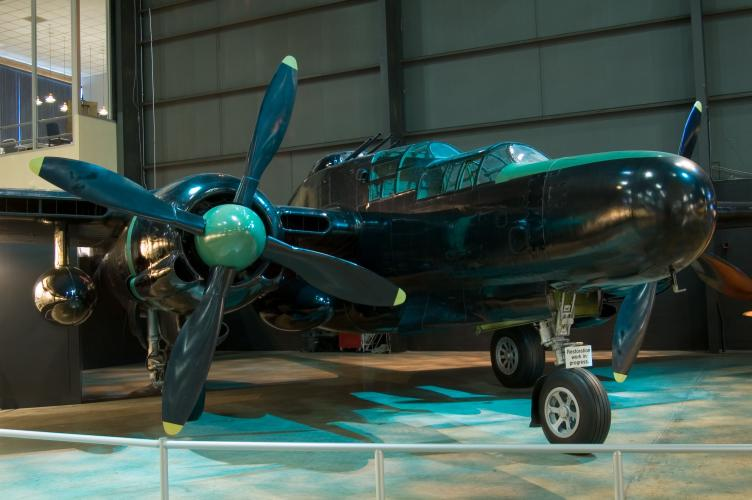
P-61C (AAF Ser. No. 43-8353) Moonlight Serenade at the National Museum of the United States Air Force

P-61C-1-NO c/n 1399 AAF Ser. No. 43-8353 is currently on display at the National Museum of the United States Air Force at Wright-Patterson AFB in Dayton, Ohio. It is marked as P-61B-1-NO 42-39468 and painted to represent "Moonlight Serenade" of the 550th Night Fighter Squadron. The aircraft was presented to the Boy Scouts of America following World War II and kept at Grimes Field in Urbana, Ohio. On June 20, 1958, it was donated to the museum by the Tecumseh Chapter of the Boy Scouts of America in Springfield, Ohio. The aircraft has had a reproduction turret, fabricated by the museum's restoration group, installed.

== Specifications (P-61B-20-NO) ==
Northrop P-61B Black Widow 3-view drawing

Data from Jane's Fighting Aircraft of World War II, Northrop P-61 Black Widow.

General characteristics

- Crew: 2–3 (pilot, radar operator, optional gunner)
- Length: 49 ft 7 in (15.11 m)
- Wingspan: 66 ft 0 in (20.12 m)
- Height: 14 ft 8 in (4.47 m)
- Wing area: 662.36 sq ft (61.535 m^{2})
- Airfoil: Zaparka
- Empty weight: 23,450 lb (10,637 kg)
- Gross weight: 29,700 lb (13,472 kg)
- Max takeoff weight: 36,200 lb (16,420 kg)
- Fuel capacity: 640 US gal (2,400 L) internal and up to four 165 US gal (625 L) drop tanks
- Powerplant: 2 × Pratt & Whitney R-2800-65W Double Wasp 18-cylinder air-cooled radial piston engines, 2,250 hp (1,680 kW) each
- Propellers: 4-bladed Curtiss Electric constant-speed feathering propellers, 12 ft 2 in (3.72 m) diameter

Performance

- Maximum speed: 366 mph (589 km/h, 318 kn) at 20,000 ft (6,100 m)
- Range: 1,350 mi (2,170 km, 1,170 nmi)
- Ferry range: 1,900 mi (3,100 km, 1,700 nmi) with four external fuel tanks
- Service ceiling: 33,100 ft (10,100 m)
- Rate of climb: 2,540 ft/min (12.9 m/s)
- Time to altitude: 20,000 ft (6,100 m) in 12 minutes
- Wing loading: 45 lb/sq ft (220 kg/m^{2})
- Power/mass: 0.15 hp/lb (0.25 kW/kg)

Armament

- Guns: 4 × 20 mm (.79 in) Hispano AN/M2 cannon in ventral fuselage, 200 rounds per gun
- 4 × .50 in (12.7 mm) M2 Browning machine guns in remotely operated, full-traverse upper turret, 560 rpg
- Bombs: for ground attack, four bombs of up to 1,600 lb (726 kg) each or six 5-in (127 mm) HVAR unguided rockets could be carried under the wings. Some aircraft could also carry one 1,000 lb (454 kg) bomb under the fuselage.

Avionics

- SCR-720 (AI Mk.X) search radar
- SCR-695 tail warning radar

== See also ==
Related development

- Northrop F-15 Reporter

Aircraft of comparable role, configuration, and era

- Boulton Paul P.92
- Bristol Beaufighter
- de Havilland Mosquito
- Douglas P-70 Havoc
- Focke-Wulf Ta 154
- Gloster F.9/37
- Grumman F7F Tigercat
- Heinkel He 219
- Junkers Ju 88
- Kawasaki Ki-102
- Lockheed P-38M Night Lightning
- Lockheed XP-58 Chain Lightning
- Messerschmitt Bf 110
- Mitsubishi Ki-83

Related lists

- List of aircraft of World War II
- List of military aircraft of the United States

== Sources ==
- Balous, Miroslav. Northrop P-61 Black Widow & F-15 Reporter (bilingual Czech and English). Prague, Czech Republic: MBI Publications, 2nd edition 2003. ISBN 80-86524-04-3.
- Balzer, Gerald H. Development History of the P-61 Black Widow. [California?]: Northrop Corporation, Norair Division, 1962. OCLC 71783725
- Bridgeman, Leonard. "The Northrop Black Widow." Jane's Fighting Aircraft of World War II. London: Studio, 1946. ISBN 978-1-85170-493-4.
- Ciampaglia, Giuseppe. Destroyers, i distruttori nella Seconda Guerra mondiale (in Italian). Rome: IBN editore, 1996. ISBN 88-86815-47-6.
- Davis, Larry and Dave Menard. P-61 Black Widow in Action (Aircraft number 106). Carrollton, Texas: Squadron/Signal Publications, Inc., 1990. ISBN 0-89747-248-9.
- Donald, David. American Combat Aircraft of World War II. London: Greenwich Editions, 1997. ISBN 0-86288-186-2 OCLC 464173790
- Francillon, Rene J. American Fighters of World War Two. Windsor: (Coburg Hse, Sheet St., Windsor, Berks.): Hylton Lacey Publishers Ltd, 1971. ISBN 0-85064-050-4 OCLC 533090
- Gellhorn, Martha. "The Black Widow", in The Face of War. Atlantic Monthly Press, 1988. ISBN 978-0-87113-211-6 (from Colliers Magazine, January 1945).
- Holmes, Tony. Fighters of World War II. New York, NY: HarperCollins, 1990. ISBN 0-00-472206-X OCLC 43516070
- Jackson, Robert. The Encyclopedia of Military Aircraft. Bath, UK: Parragon Publishing, 2006. ISBN 1-4054-2465-6.
- Johnsen, Frederick A. Darkly Dangerous: The Northrop P-61 Black Widow Night Fighter. Washington, D.C.: Bomber Books, 1981. OCLC 11043715.
- Johnson, Bob. "Seeing Eye Widow." Scale Modeler, Volume 11, Issue 2, February 1976.
- Kolln, Jeff. Northrop's Night Hunter: P-61 Black Widow. North Branch, MN: Specialty Press, 2008. ISBN 1-58007-122-8.
- Kolln, Jeff. The 421st Night Fighter Squadron in World War II. Atglen, Pennsylvania: Schiffer Military Books, 2001. ISBN 0-7643-1306-1.
- Mason, Tim. The Secret Years: Flight Testing at Boscombe Down, 1939–1945. Aldershot, UK: Hikoki Publications, 1998. ISBN 978-1-902109-14-5.
- McLaren, David R. Black Widow: The Story of the Northrop P-61. Colorado Springs, CO: ViP Pub, 1993. ISBN 0-934575-11-8 OCLC 35837821
- Merriam, Ray. U.S. Warplanes of World War II, Volume I. Bennington, VT: Merriam Press, 2000. ISBN 1-57638-167-6 OCLC 46326173
- Mondey, David. The Hamlyn Concise Guide to American Aircraft of World War II. Edison, NJ: Chartwell Books, 2002. ISBN 0-7858-1361-6 OCLC 52279707
- O'Leary, Michael. USAAF Fighters of World War II in Action. Poole [Dorset]: Blandford Press, 1986. ISBN 0-7137-1839-0 OCLC 16695869
- Pape, Garry R.; Campbell, John M.; Campbell, Donna (1991). Northrop P-61 Black Widow: The Complete History and Combat Record. St. Paul, Minnesota: Motorbooks International. ISBN 0-87938-509-X.
- Pape, Garry R.; Harrison, Ronald C. (November 1976). "Dark Lady, Pt. II - The Further Adventures of Northrop's Flying Spider Ship ... From P-61B Through P-61E". Airpower. Vol. 6, no. 6.
- Pape, Garry R.; Harrison, Ronald C. (1992). Queen of the Midnight Skies: The Story of America's Air Force Night Fighters. Atglen, Pennsylvania: Schiffer Publishing. ISBN 0-88740-415-4.
- Sharp, C.M. and M.J.F. Bowyer. Mosquito. London: Crecy Publishing, 1997. ISBN 978-0-947554-41-5.
- Shulenberger, Eric. Deny Them the Night Sky - A History of the 548th Night Fighter Squadron. Seattle, Washington: Shulenberger Publishing, 2005. ISBN 978-0-9767355-0-2.
- Tedeschi, Diane. "High Flyer." Air & Space, Volume 21, Issue 2, July 2006.
- Thompson, Warren. P-61 Black Widow Units of World War 2. Botley, Oxford, UK: Osprey Publishing, 1998. ISBN 1-85532-725-2.
- Thompson, Warren. Northrop P-61 Black Widow: WarbirdTech Volume 15. North Branch, Minnesota: Specialty Press, 1998. ISBN 0-933424-80-9.
- Thompson, Warren. "Northrop P-61 Black Widow". Wings of Fame. Volume 15, 1999, pp. 36–101. London: Aerospace. ISBN 1-86184-033-0.
- Thompson, Warren. "The Widow from Hawthorne". Air Enthusiast Volume 1, Issue 1, June 1971.
- Veronico, Nick. Hidden Warbirds: The Epic Stories of Finding, Recovering, and Rebuilding WWII's Lost Aircraft. Minneapolis, Minnesota : Zenith Press, 2013. ISBN 0-7603-4409-4 OCLC 824532572
- Wilson, Stewart. Aircraft of WWII. Fyshwick, ACT, Australia: Aerospace Publications Pty. Ltd., 1998. ISBN 1-875671-35-8.
- Zbiegniewski, Andre R. 421 NFS 1943–1947 (Bilingual Polish and English). Lublin, Poland: Kagero, 2004. ISBN 83-89088-47-9.
