= RAF Scorton =

Royal Air Force base in Yorkshire, England

RAF Scorton USAAF-425
- Scorton, North Yorkshire in England
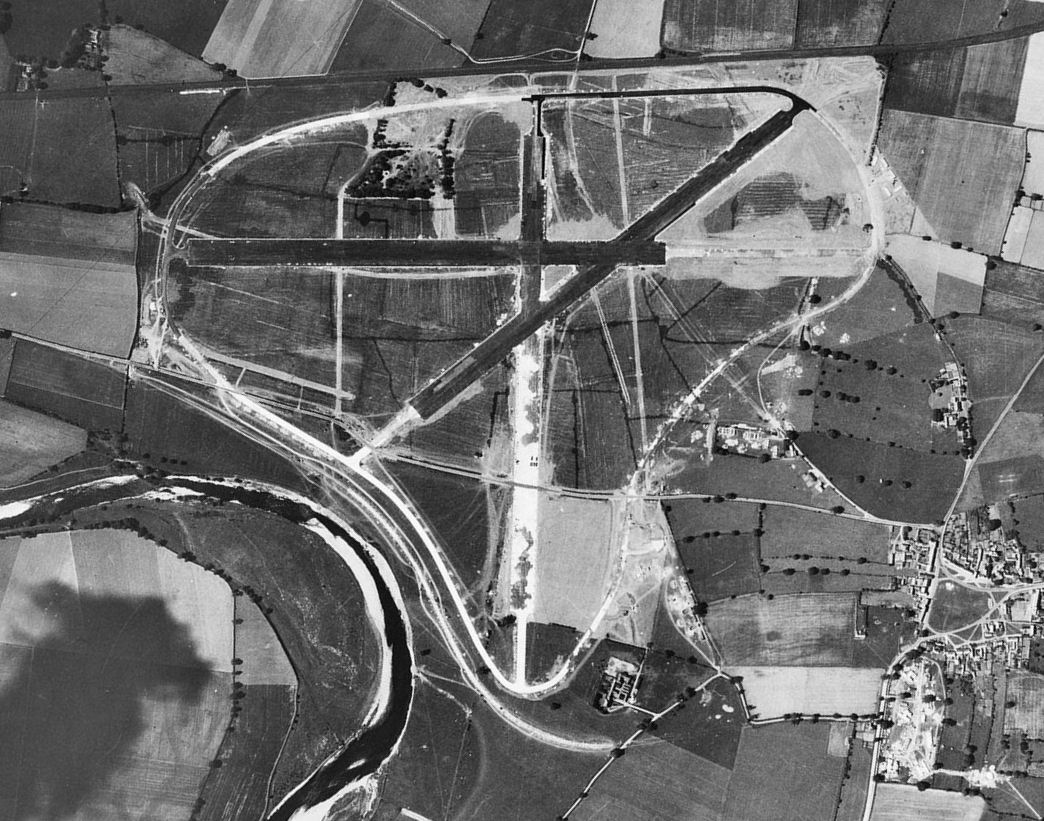
- Aerial photograph of RAF Scorton looking north, 26 June 1941.

Site information
- Type: Royal Air Force Satellite Station
- Code: SO
- Owner: Air Ministry
- Operator: Royal Air Force; Ninth Air Force
- Controlled by: RAF Fighter Command * No. 13 Group RAF; RAF Balloon Command

Location
- Shown within North Yorkshire
- Coordinates: 54°24′03″N 001°37′30″W

Site history
- Built: 1939
- In use: October 1939 - 1952
- Battles/wars: European theatre of World War II

Airfield information
- Elevation: 200 feet (61 m) AMSL
Runways
Direction	Length and surface
258	1,600 yards (1,463 m) Tarmac
220	1,200 yards (1,097 m) Tarmac
351	1,200 yards (1,097 m) Tarmac

Royal Air Force Scorton or more simply RAF Scorton is a former Royal Air Force satellite station located next to the village of Scorton in North Yorkshire, England. The base was opened in October 1939 as part of 13 Group RAF Fighter Command and a satellite station of RAF Catterick. It was used by the Royal Air Force, the Royal Canadian Air Force, and the United States Army Air Forces Ninth Air Force during the war.

The famous No. 56 Squadron RAF flew Supermarine Spitfires from Scorton during the Second World War. Also the USAAF 422d and 425th Night Fighter Squadrons were stationed at Scorton flying the Northrop P-61 Black Widow fighter.

After the war, it was kept for a while as a Maintenance Unit base, then disposed of in the 1950s. It is now a site of gravel extraction.

== History ==
The location was chosen for its flat terrain and its situation close to the now disbanded Eryholme-Richmond branch line that had a sub branch line to Catterick Garrison and RAF Catterick. The first unit to use the airfield was a detachment of Bristol Blenheim aircraft from No. 219 (Mysore) Squadron, which had reformed at RAF Catterick in the same month that Scorton had opened.

Although originally designated as a satellite station, in 1941, the site was extended into a 'full' RAF station with 12 hangars and three tarmac runways, with the main east/west runway measuring 4,800 feet (1,500 m) compared to RAF Catterick's runway which was 3,300 feet (1,000 m). This was done because Catterick could not be extended as it was sandwiched between the Great North Road and the River Swale. At the same time, the decoy landing site at Birkby (to the east near to Danby Wiske, came under the command of Scorton, having previously been an asset of RAF Catterick.

On its re-opening, the first squadron allocated to Scorton was No. 122 (Bombay), which was equipped with Spitfire Vs for convoy patrols over the North Sea. No. 122 left for RAF Hornchurch in 1942, with No. 406 Squadron RCAF and No. 219 Squadron later operating from the base. Initially, four aircraft from No. 406 Sqn were detached to Scorton from RAF Drem in February 1942, with the rest of the squadron following in the same year. Both 219 and 406 would later move out again and during 1943, No. 167 (Gold Coast) Squadron was reformed at Scorton, before moving to RAF Castletown. Between the spring of 1943, and the spring of 1944, Scorton was host to No. 604 (County of Middlesex) Squadron AAF who arrived from RAF Ford in Hampshire and No. 56 Squadron from RAF Martlesham Heath. The squadrons flew Beaufighters and Typhoons respectively.

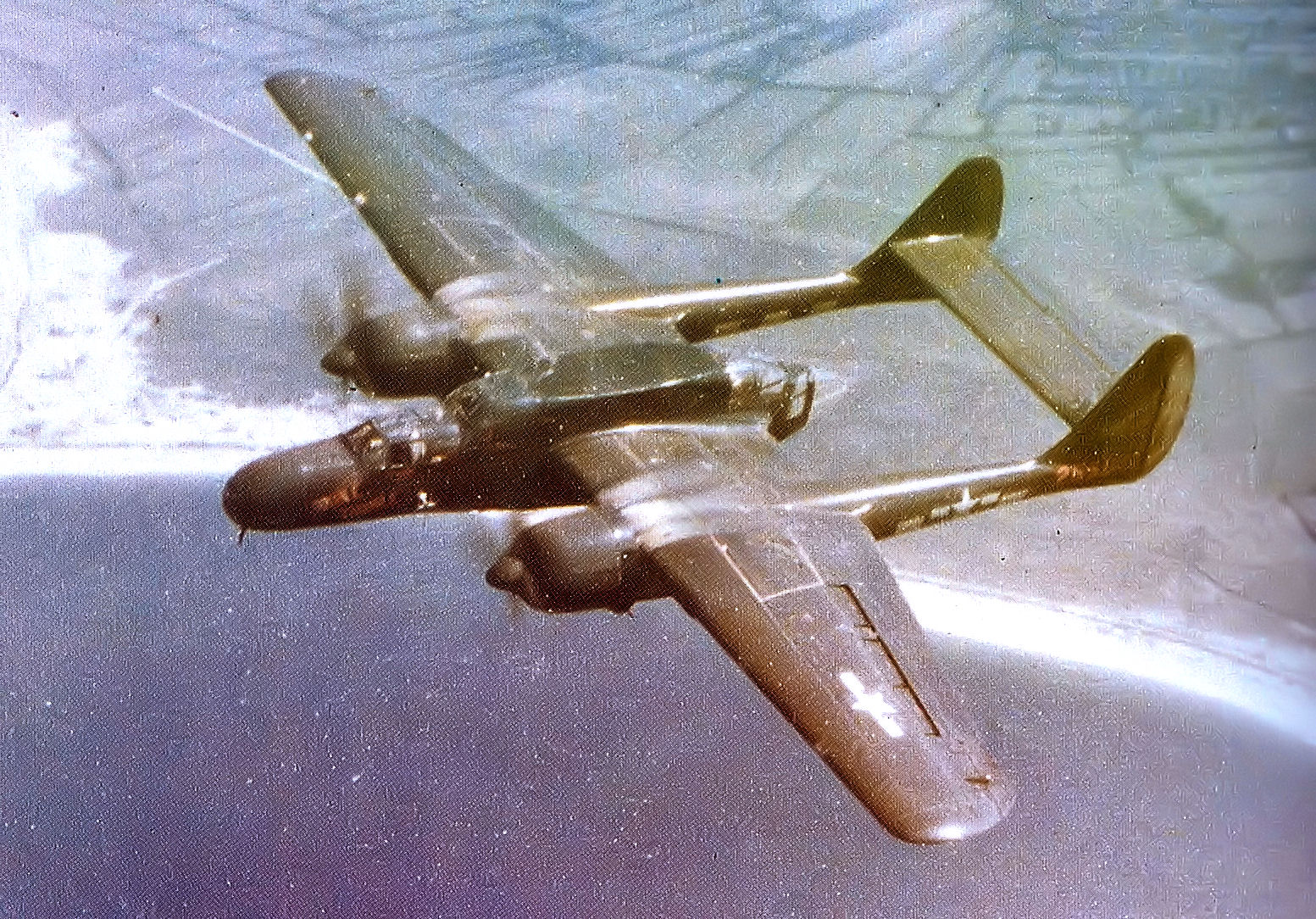
Northrop P-61A-10-NO Black Widow Serial 42-5565 "Double Trouble" of the 422d Night Fighter Squadron.

In May 1944, the USAAF Ninth Air Force transferred two Northrop P-61 Black Widow night interceptor squadrons, No.s 422 and 425, to Scorton from RAF Charmy Down near Bath in Somerset, to train and fly with the RAF night fighter Operational Training Unit assigned there. Initially flying de Havilland Mosquitoes, their first P-61 arrived at Scorton in May 1944 and their first assignment was to chase night-flying V-1 "buzz bombs". Scorton was known as USAAF Station AAF-425 for security reasons by the USAAF during the war, and by which it was referred to instead of location.

The Black Widows would be vectored to intercept approaching V-1s by ground control. Since the V-1 was a little faster than the P-61, the Black Widow had to approach the V-1 from behind and go into a slight dive in order to catch up with it.

The first Black Widow V-1 "kill" took place on 16 July 1944, credited to pilot Herman Ernst and radar operator Edward Kopsel of the 422nd Night Fighter Squadron. One of the greatest dangers involved in killing V-1s was the possibility of getting too close to the flying bomb when one fired at it, running the risk of damage to their own plane if the bomb exploded when hit.

After D-Day, the USAAF Black Widows moved to Advanced Landing Grounds at Maupertus (A-15) (422d NFS) near Cherbourg and Vannes (A-33N) (425th NFS) in Brittany France to intercept German night fighters and bombers attacking Allied positions.

After the two American squadrons vacated the base, it was quiet again for a period before the site was transferred from Fighter Command to Balloon Command who used the site for storage. At the end of the war, the airfield was surplus to requirements, but was used first by No. 224 Maintenance Unit, and then with No. 91 Maintenance Unit, who vacated the site in 1952.

== Units ==
The following squadrons were here at some point:

- No. 26 (South African) Squadron RAF (1944) – North American Mustang I
- No. 56 Squadron RAF (1944) – Supermarine Spitfire IX
- No. 122 (Bombay) Squadron RAF (1941–1942) – Supermarine Spitfire IIA, IIB and VB
- No. 130 (Punjab) Squadron RAF (1943) – Supermarine Spitfire VB
- No. 167 (Gold Coast) Squadron RAF (1942) – Supermarine Spitfire VB
- No. 219 (Mysore) Squadron RAF (1942–1943) – Bristol Beaufighter IF
- No. 406 Squadron RCAF (1942) – Bristol Beaufighter IIF
- No. 410 Squadron RCAF (1942) – Bristol Beaufighter IIF
- No. 604 (County of Middlesex) Squadron AAF (1943) – Bristol Beaufighter IF

The airfield was also home to the following units:

- No. 142 Airfield Headquarters RAF formed here on 1 January 1944
- No. 911/923 (Balloon) Squadron
- No. 950 (Balloon) Squadron

== Postwar use ==
The Aerodrome closed in 1945 and most of the concreted areas have been extensively quarried away for sand and gravel extraction. Most of what was the airfield is now under a lake and a quarry. There are a few military pre-fab buildings remaining in the area – they were dismantled after the war and moved to local farms to be used as agricultural buildings. The site does still have some remnants from the era, such as accommodation huts and brick-built pillboxes. Some of the newer roads in Scorton have been named after Second World War Aircraft (Beaufighter Close, Typhoon Close and Spitfire Court).

== See also ==
- List of former Royal Air Force stations
