= Northrop F-15 Reporter =

Photo-reconnaissance variant of the P-61 Black Widow

F-15A / RF-61C Reporter
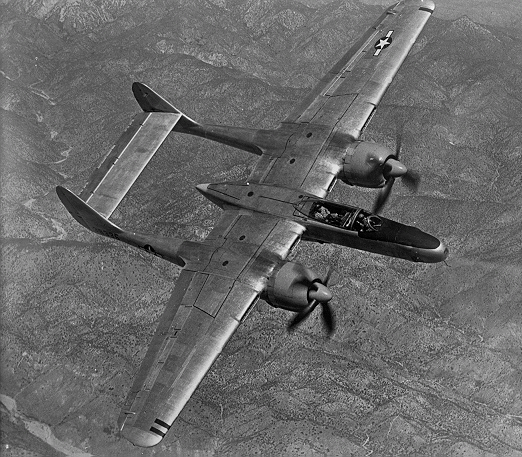
- An F-15A later used in "Operation Thunderstorm"

General information
- Type: Photographic reconnaissance
- National origin: United States
- Manufacturer: Northrop Corporation
- Status: Retired
- Primary user: United States Air Force
- Number built: 36

History
- First flight: 3 July 1945
- Retired: 1968
- Developed from: Northrop P-61 Black Widow

The Northrop F-15 Reporter (later RF-61) was an American unarmed photographic reconnaissance aircraft. Based on the Northrop P-61 Black Widow night fighter, it was the last piston-powered photo-reconnaissance aircraft designed and produced for the United States Air Force. Though produced in limited quantities, and with a relatively short service life, the F-15's aerial photographs of the Korean Peninsula would prove vital in 1950, when North Korea invaded the south.

== Design and development ==
The F-15 Reporter was created when the guns were removed from the experimental XP-61E, the last fighter variant of the P-61 Black Widow. With less than six months flying time, the first XP-61E was taken back to the Northrop modification shop where it was converted into an unarmed photographic reconnaissance aircraft. All the guns were removed, and a new nose was fitted, capable of holding an assortment of aerial cameras. The aircraft, redesignated XF-15, flew for the first time on 3 July 1945, with Northrop test pilot L. A. "Slim" Parrett at the controls. A P-61C-1-NO (serial number 42-8335) was also modified to XF-15 standards as the XF-15A. Apart from the turbosupercharged R-2800-C engines, it was identical to the XF-15 and flew for the first time on 17 October 1945. For unknown reasons Northrop subcontracted the nose for the F-15A to the Hughes Tool Company of Culver City, California. The F-15A used the existing P-61C wings (without fighter brakes), engines and tail sections but with an entirely new, more streamlined fuselage housing a crew of two under a continuous bubble-canopy.

As a result of continuing development trouble with the Howard Hughes-designed XF-11, the staff of the Army Air Force Headquarters determined an immediate need for 320 F-15 Reporters. Even before the first flight of the XF-15 an initial contract for 175 aircraft was signed in June 1945. Following testing it was determined that the F-15 Reporter possessed similar performance and flight characteristics to the troublesome XF-11, despite the Reporter being powered by less powerful engines, and using mostly pre-existing parts. This spelled the end to further development of the XF-11.

The first production F-15A was accepted in September 1946. However, the contract was abruptly canceled in 1947, possibly because the performance of the aircraft was rapidly being overshadowed by jets, with the last of only 36 examples being accepted by the United States Army Air Forces in April of that year. The last F-15 to be produced (serial number 45-59335) was produced as an F-15A-5-NO, which differed from the Block-1 version mainly in having a new internal camera installation in the nose. It seems that this change had been contemplated for the last 20 F-15s as well, since some records indicate that these were all eventually re-designated as F-15A-5-NO.

== Design ==
The F-15 had a revised center pod with pilot and camera operator seated in tandem under a single bubble canopy. The first XP-61E, from which the first XF-15 was converted, had the canopy hinged to the side, while all subsequent XF-15 and production F-15 employed a sliding canopy. The aircraft's six cameras were placed in an elongated nose, replacing the XP-61Es four guns. Production F-15A were powered by the same turbosupercharged R-2800-73 engines as the P-61C. The aircraft had a takeoff weight of 32,145 lb (14,580 kg) and a top speed of 440 mph (382 kn, 708 km/h) at 33,000 ft (10,058 m). In the end, only 36 of the 175 ordered F-15As were built, and all were constructed from aircraft originally contracted to be built as P-61C.

== Operational history ==
Of the 36 F-15As produced, nine were allocated to the Air Material Command in the Continental U.S., and the remainder were issued to just one squadron, the 8th Photographic Reconnaissance Squadron (PRS) attached to the 35th Fighter Group in Japan. The first four were sent over by ship, arriving in March 1947 at the Japan Air Material Area (JAMA), Kisarazu, Japan. Their voyage had not been smooth, and three of the four were in such bad shape that they were used for spare parts.

Of the nine F-15A allocated to Air Material Command, several were operated for a short time by the Pennsylvania Air National Guard from their base in Harrisburg, Pennsylvania, before they too were scrapped.

=== Mapping of Korea ===
During their operational lifetime F-15As, mostly operating from bases in Japan, were responsible for most of the aerial maps of North Korea used at the start of the Korean War. These photographs were to prove extremely valuable, as it was not until the arrival of Marine photo-reconnaissance F7F-3P in late 1950 that additional photographs of the peninsula could be made, and then only under constant threat from attacking North Korean MiGs.

=== Civilian use ===
Some surviving F-15As were offered to civilian governmental agencies, or declared surplus and offered for sale on the commercial market.

An F-15A (s/n 45-59300) was used by NACA at Moffett Field in California to test some early swept-wing designs by dropping recoverable aerodynamic test bodies from high altitude. This program was later joined by F-61C serial number 43-8330, borrowed from the Smithsonian Institution for the duration of the tests. These drops were carried out over Edwards Air Force Base in the Mojave Desert in California.

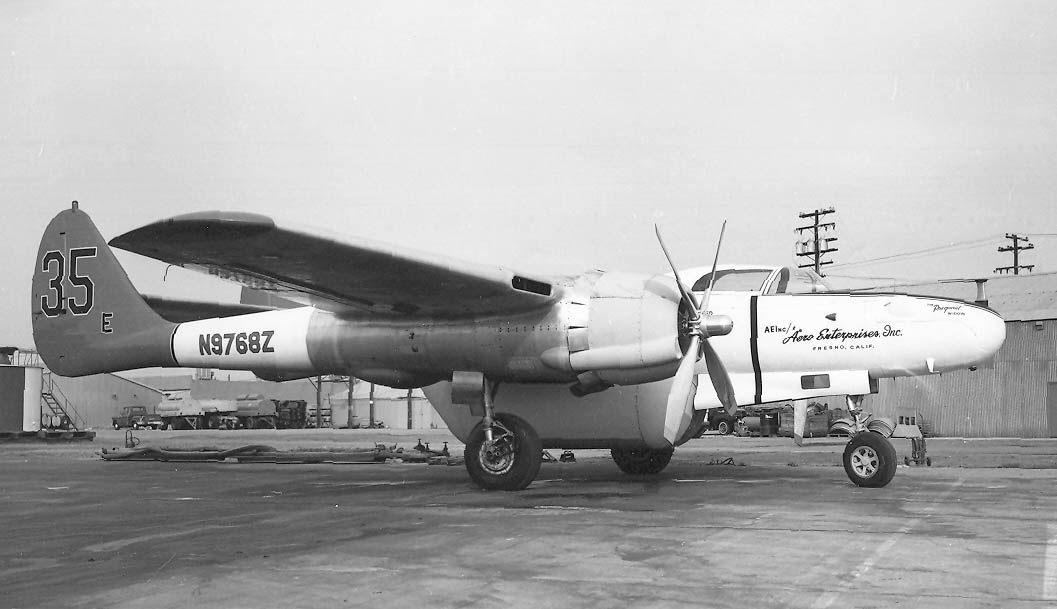

The last flying example of the entire P-61 line was a rare F-15A Reporter (RF-61C) (s/n 45-59300), the first production model Reporter to be built. The aircraft was completed on 15 May 1946, and served with the USAAF and later the U.S. Air Force until 6 February 1948, when it was reassigned to the Ames Aeronautical Laboratory at Moffett Field in California. There it was reconfigured to serve as a launch vehicle for air dropped scale models of experimental aircraft. It served in this capacity until 1953, when it was replaced by a mammoth wind tunnel used for the same testing. In April, 1955, the F-15 was declared surplus along with a "spare parts" F-61C (s/n 43-8357). The F-15 was sold, along with the parts P-61, to Steward-Davis Incorporated of Gardena, California, and given the civilian registration N5093V. Unable to sell the P-61C, Steward-Davis scrapped it in 1957. Steward-Davis made several modifications to the Reporter to make it suitable for aerial survey work, including switching to a canopy taken from a T-33, and to propellers taken from an older P-61. The plane was sold in September, 1956 to Compania Mexicana Aerofoto S. A. of Mexico City and assigned the Mexican registration XB-FUJ. In Mexico, the Reporter was used for aerial survey work, the very role for which it was originally designed. It was bought by Aero Enterprises Inc. of Willits, California and returned to the US in January 1964 carrying the civilian registration number N9768Z. The fuselage tank and turbosupercharger intercoolers were removed; and the plane was fitted with a 1,600 gal (6,056 L) chemical tank for fire-fighting. It was purchased by Cal-Nat of Fresno, California at the end of 1964, which operated it as a firefighting aircraft for the next 3 1/2 years. In March 1968, the F-15 was purchased by TBM, Inc., an aerial firefighting company located in Tulare, California (the company's name representing the TBM Avenger, their primary equipment), who performed additional modifications on the aircraft to improve its performance, including experimenting with several types of propellers before deciding on Curtiss Electric type 34 propellers taken from a late model Lockheed Constellation.

On 6 September 1968, Ralph Ponte, one of three civilian pilots to hold a rating for the F-15, was flying a series of routine Phos-Chek drops on a fire raging near Hollister, California. In an effort to reduce his return time Ponte opted to reload at a small airfield nearer the fire. The runway was shorter than the one in Fresno, and despite Ponte reducing his load, hot air from the nearby fire reduced the surrounding air pressure and rendered the aircraft overweight. Even at full power the Reporter had not rotated after clearing the 3,500 ft (1,067 m) marker, and Ponte quickly decided to abort his takeoff. He made every effort to control the hurtling craft, but the Reporter careened off the runway and through a vegetable patch, before striking an embankment which tore off the landing gear. The aircraft then slid sideways, broke up, and caught fire. Ponte scrambled through the shattered canopy unhurt, while a firefighting TBM Avenger dropped its load of Phos-Chek on the plane's two engines, possibly saving Ponte's life. The F-15 was deemed too badly damaged to rebuild, and was soon scrapped, bringing an end to the aircraft's career.

== Variants ==
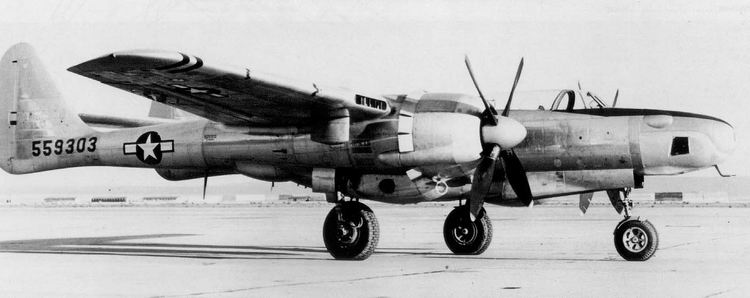
F-15A

XF-15
The first prototype, converted from the first XP-61E.
XF-15A
The second prototype, converted from a P-61C (number 43-8335).
F-15A Reporter
Photoreconnaissance variant with a new center pod with pilot and camera operator seated in tandem under a single bubble canopy, and six cameras taking place of radar in the nose. Powered by the same turbosupercharged R-2800-73 engines as the P-61C. The aircraft had a takeoff weight of 32,145 lb (14,580 kg) and a top speed of 440 mph (382 kn, 708 km/h). Only 36 of the 175 ordered F-15As were built before the end of the war. After formation of the United States Air Force in 1947, F-15A was redesignated RF-61C. F-15As were responsible for most of the aerial maps of North Korea used at the start of the Korean War.
RF-61C Reporter
USAF designation for the F-15C from 1948 onwards.

== Operators ==
United States

- United States Air Force
  - Alaskan Air Command
    - 449th Fighter Squadron (All Weather). Formed from equipment and personnel of 415th Night Fighter Squadron at Adak Air Field, Aleutian Islands, Alaska on 1 Sep 1947. Later transitioned to F-82 Twin Mustang in mid-1948.
    - 8th Photographic Reconnaissance Squadron. Flew F-15A (RF-61C) Reporter (1947–1949) from Johnson AB, Japan. Aircraft reassigned to 82d Tactical Reconnaissance Squadron until inactivated on 1 Apr 1949
  - Continental Air Forces
    - 57th Reconnaissance Squadron and 58th Reconnaissance Squadron. Performed Weather Reconnaissance training at Rapid City AAF, South Dakota (July 1945-Jan 1946).

== Specifications (F-15A Reporter) ==
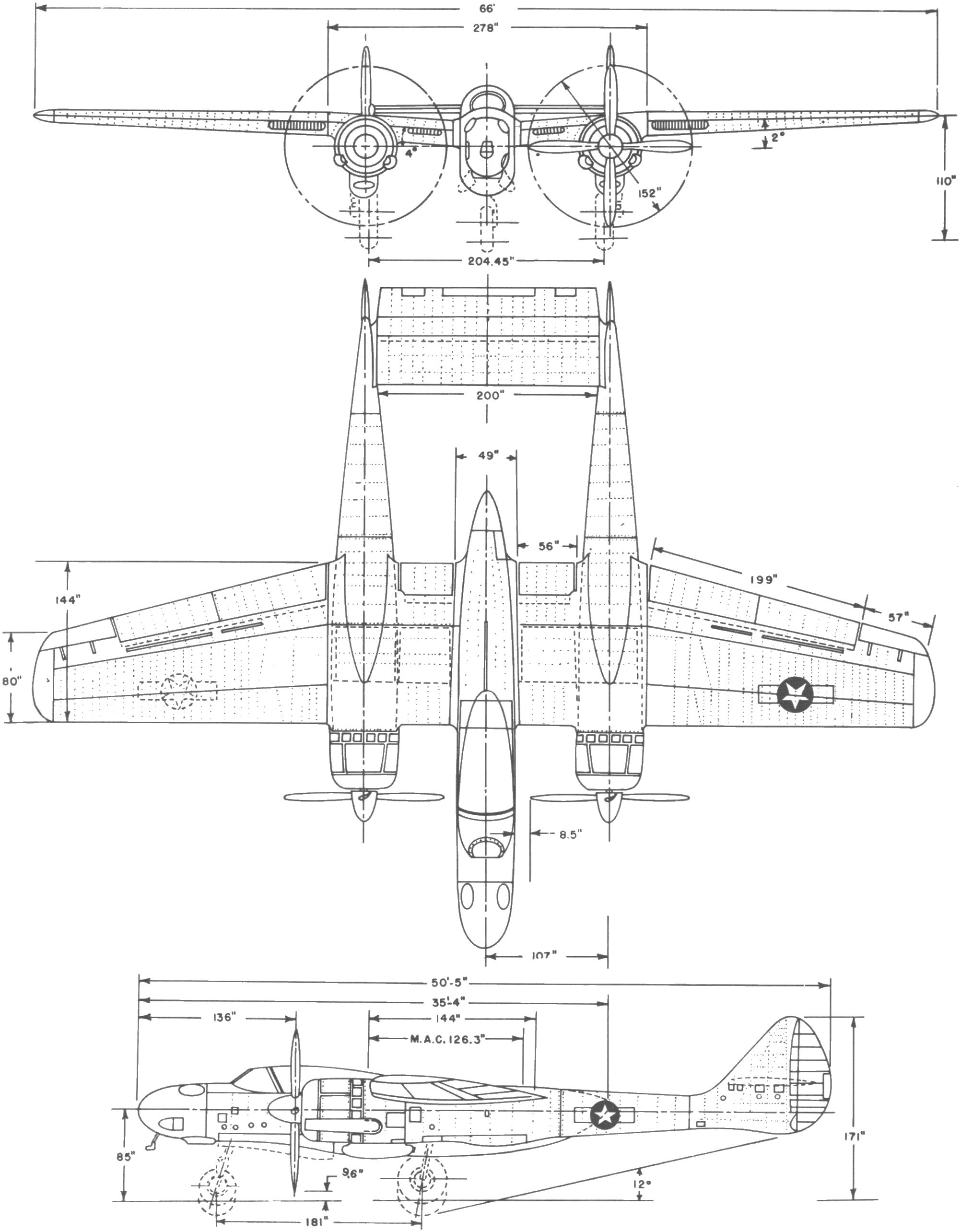
3-view line drawing of the Northrop F-15 Reporter

Data from Jane's all the World's Aircraft 1947

General characteristics

- Length: 50 ft 3 in (15.31 m)
- Wingspan: 66 ft 0 in (20.12 m)
- Height: 9 ft 2 in (2.79 m)
- Wing area: 664 sq ft (61.7 m^{2})
- Gross weight: 28,000 lb (12,701 kg)
- Fuel capacity: 500 US gal (420 imp gal; 1,900 L) in fuselage main tank with secondary tanks in the wings, plus provision for drop tanks under inner and outer wings
- Powerplant: 2 × Pratt & Whitney R-2800-C Double Wasp 18-cyl. air-cooled radial piston engines, 2,100 hp (1,600 kW) each
- Propellers: 4-bladed Curtiss Electric, 12 ft 8 in (3.86 m) diameter fully feathering airscrews

Performance

- Maximum speed: 440 mph (710 km/h, 380 kn) plus
- Landing speed: 80 mph (70 kn; 130 km/h)
- Ferry range: 4,000 mi (6,400 km, 3,500 nmi) with drop tanks
- Service ceiling: 35,000 ft (11,000 m) plus
- Wing loading: 45.18 lb/sq ft (220.6 kg/m^{2})
- Power/mass: 6.66 lb/hp (4.05 kg/kW)

== See also ==
Related development

- Northrop P-61 Black Widow

Aircraft of comparable role, configuration, and era

- Grumman F7F-3P Tigercat
- Hughes XF-11
- Lockheed F-4/F-5 Lightning

Related lists

- List of military aircraft of the United States
