= 4709th Air Defense Wing =

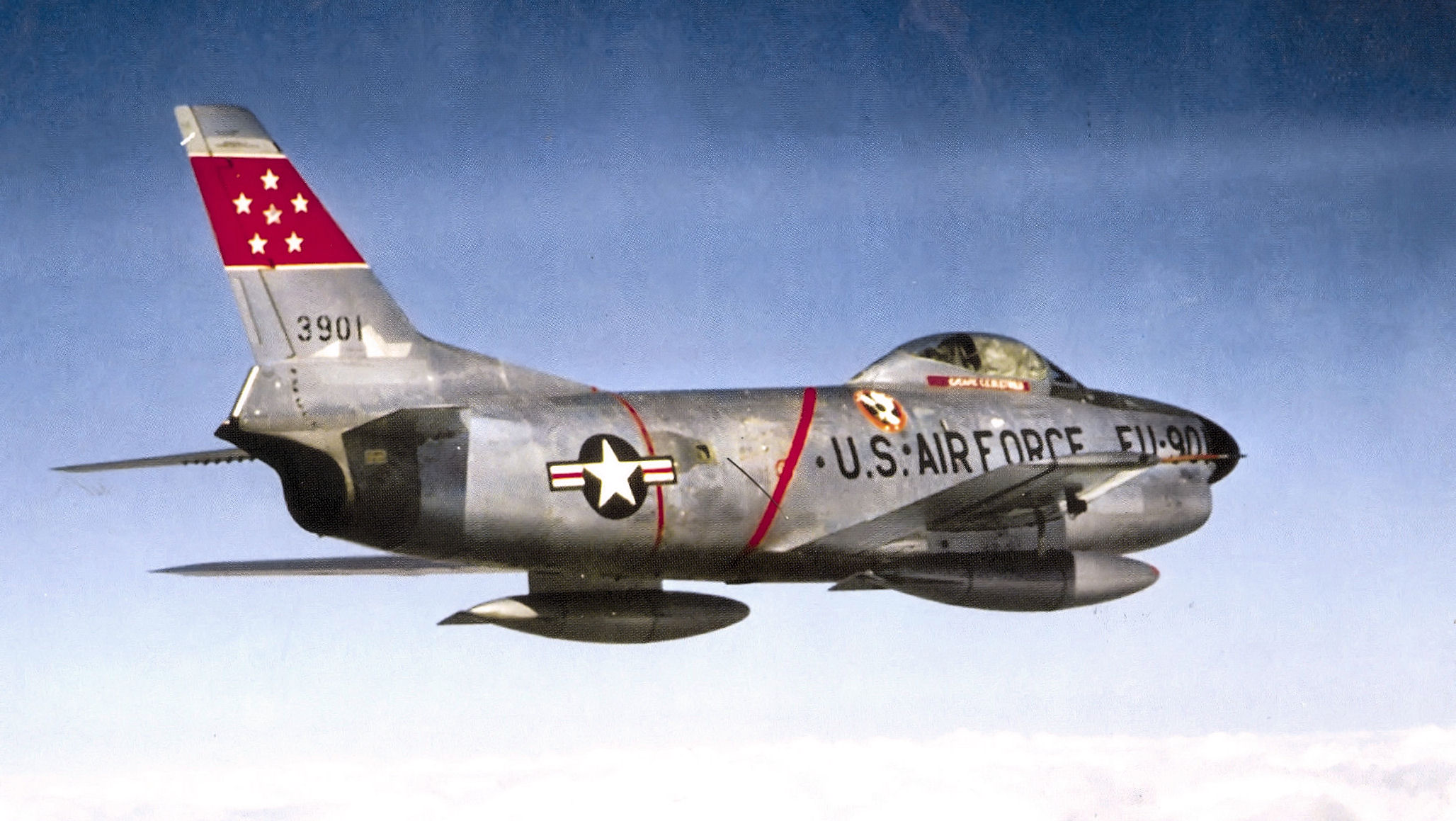
- F-86D of the Wing's 332d Fighter-Interceptor Squadron (Note: Aircraft is North American F-86D-45-NA Sabre, serial 52-3901.)
- Active: 1952–1956
- Country: United States
- Branch: United States Air Force
- Type: Fighter interceptor and radar
- Role: Air Defense
- Size: Wing

The 4709th Air Defense Wing is a discontinued United States Air Force organization. Its last assignment was with the 26th Air Division of Air Defense Command (ADC) at McGuire Air Force Base, New Jersey, where it was discontinued in 1956. It was established in 1952 at McGuire as the 4709th Defense Wing in a general reorganization of ADC, which replaced wings responsible for a base with wings responsible for a geographical area. It assumed control of several fighter Interceptor squadrons that had been assigned to the 52d Fighter-Interceptor Wing, some of which were Air National Guard squadrons mobilized for the Korean War. It also assumed host responsibility for McGuire through its subordinate 568th Air Base Group.

In early 1953 it also was assigned two radar squadrons guarding the approaches to New York City and its dispersed fighter squadrons combined with colocated air base squadrons into air defense groups. When McGuire became a Military Air Transport Service base in 1954, the 4709th became a tenant at McGuire. The wing was redesignated as an air defense wing the same year. Starting in 1956, in preparation for the implementation of the Semi-Automatic Ground Environment automated air defense system, the 4621st Air Defense Wing was activated at McGuire and attached to the 4709th. Its radar units were transferred to the 4621st and the wing was discontinued in 1956.

== History ==
The wing was organized as the 4709th Defense Wing at the beginning of February 1952 at McGuire Air Force Base, New Jersey as part of a major reorganization of Air Defense Command ()C responding to ADC's difficulty under the existing wing base organizational structure in deploying fighter squadrons to best advantage. It assumed operational control and the air defense mission of fighter squadrons formerly assigned to the inactivating 52d Fighter-Interceptor Wing. The 2d and 5th Fighter-Interceptor Squadrons, flying Lockheed F-94 Starfire interceptor aircraft, were located at McGuire. The federalized 105th Fighter-Interceptor Squadron was located at Berry Field, Nashville, Tennessee and was flying World War II era F-47 Thunderbolt aircraft. The wing also was assigned another federalized Air National Guard squadron, the 118th Fighter-Interceptor Squadron at Suffolk County Air Force Base Missile Annex, New York, also flying Thunderbolts, which was reassigned from the inactivating 103d Fighter-Interceptor Wing. The support elements of the 52d Wing's 52d Air Base Group and 52d Maintenance & Supply Group were replaced at McGuire by the wing's 568th Air Base Group and air base squadrons were activated at each of the dispersed bases assigned to the wing to support the fighter squadrons at those stations. The wing's mission was to train and maintain tactical units in a state of readiness to intercept and destroy enemy aircraft attempting to penetrate the air defense system in the Northeastern United States.

The stay of the 105th Squadron with the wing was brief. In July 1952, it moved to McGhee Tyson Airport, Knoxville, Tennessee, and the next month as areas of responsibility for air defense were realigned, and it transferred to the 35th Air Division. In November, the 118th Squadron was returned to the Connecticut Air National Guard and its personnel and equipment handed over to the newly activating 45th Fighter-Interceptor Squadron. A second fighter squadron, the 75th Fighter-Interceptor Squadron, flying Sabres, moved to Suffolk County from Presque Isle Air Force Base, Maine in October and was assigned to the wing, while at Sewart Air Force Base, New York, the 330th Fighter-Interceptor Squadron, flying Lockheed F-80 Shooting Star aircraft, was activated and assigned to the wing.

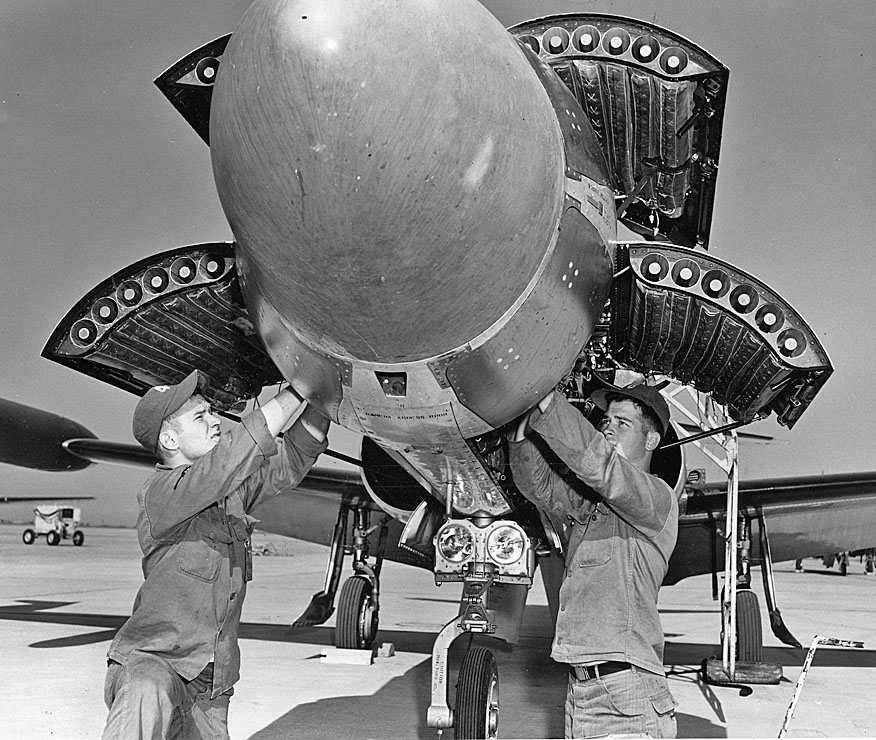
F-94 Starfire being armed with Mighty Mouse rockets

In February 1953, another major reorganization of ADC activated air defense groups at ADC bases with dispersed fighter squadrons. These groups were assigned to the wing and assumed direct control of the fighter squadrons at those bases, as well as support squadrons to carry out their role as the USAF host organizations at the bases. As a result of this reorganization, the 568th Air Base Group was redesignated the 568th Air Defense Group and assumed control of the fighter squadrons at McGuire, and the 4700th Air Base Group at Sewart was redesignated the 4700th Air Defense Group and was assigned the 330th Squadron. A new unit, the 519th Air Defense Group, activated to command the squadrons at Suffolk County. The reorganization also resulted in the wing adding the radar detection, control and warning mission, and it was assigned two aircraft control & warning squadrons to perform this mission.

In July 1954, McGuire transferred from ADC to Military Air Transport Service and its 1611th Air Transport Wing, which assumed base support functions from the inactivating 568th Group. As a result of the group's inactivation, the 2nd and 5th Fighter-Interceptor Squadrons once again reported directly to the wing.

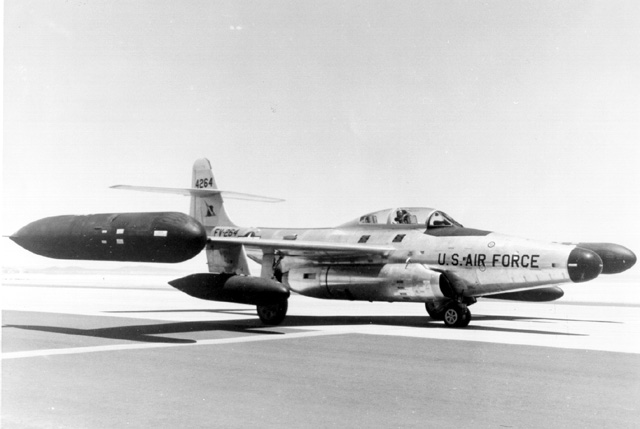
Northrop F-89 Scorpion, flown by the 4709th Air Defense Wing in 1956

In 1955, ADC implemented Project Arrow, which was designed to bring back on the active list the fighter units which had compiled memorable records in the two world wars. As a result of Project Arrow, the 52d Fighter Group (Air Defense) replaced the 518th Group at Suffolk County and the 329th Fighter Group (Air Defense) replaced the 4700th Group. Because Project Arrow called for fighter squadrons to be assigned to their traditional group headquarters, the 2nd and 5th Squadrons moved from McGuire to Suffolk County and were replaced at McGuire by the 332d and 539th Fighter-Interceptor Squadrons, which moved from other ADC bases and took over their personnel and aircraft.

In preparation for the implementation of the Semi-Automatic Ground Environment (SAGE) air defense system, the 4621st Air Defense Wing (SAGE) was organized at McGuire in the Spring of 1956 and assigned to the 26th Air Division. It was initially attached to the 4709th Air Defense Wing and two squadrons programmed for the SAGE system were assigned to the 4709th as well, until the 4621st Wing assumed the mission of the 4709th Wing in October, and the 4709th was discontinued shortly thereafter. Because areas of responsibility were changing with the implementation of SAGE, Dover Air Force Base, Delaware's 46th Fighter-Interceptor Squadron, flying Starfires had been transferred to the 4709th Wing from the 4710th Air Defense Wing in March, as was a second squadron activated at Dover later that month, the 98th Fighter-Interceptor Squadron, flying Northrop F-89 Scorpion aircraft.

== Lineage ==
- Designated as the 4709th Defense Wing and organized on 1 February 1952

Redesignated 4709th Air Defense Wing on 1 September 1954
Discontinued on 18 October 1956

=== Assignments ===
- Eastern Air Defense Force, 1 February 1952
- 26th Air Division, 16 February 1953 – 18 October 1956

=== Components ===
==== Wing ====
- 4621st Air Defense Wing, 1 April 1956 – 1 October 1956 (attached)

==== Groups ====
- 52d Fighter Group (Air Defense), 18 August 1955 – 1 March 1956; 8 July 1956 – 1 October 1956

Suffolk County Air Force Base, New York

- 329th Fighter Group (Air Defense), 18 August 1955 – 8 July 1956

Sewart Air Force Base, New York

- 519th Air Defense Group, 16 February 1953 – 18 August 1955

Suffolk County Air Force Base, New York

- 568th Air Base Group (later 568th Air Defense Group), 1 February 1952 – 8 July 1954
- 4700th Air Defense Group, 20 September 1954 – 18 August 1955

Sewart Air Force Base, New York

==== Squadrons ====
Fighter Squadrons

- 2d Fighter-Interceptor Squadron, 6 February 1952 – 16 February 1953; 8 July 1954 – 18 August 1955
- 5th Fighter-Interceptor Squadron, 6 February 1952 – 16 February 1953; 8 July 1954 – 18 August 1955
- 45th Fighter-Interceptor Squadron, 1 November 1952 – 16 February 1953

Suffolk County Air Force Base, New York

- 46th Fighter-Interceptor Squadron, 1 March 1956 – 1 October 1956

Dover Air Force Base, Delaware

- 75th Fighter-Interceptor Squadron, 14 October 1952 – 16 February 1953

Suffolk County Air Force Base, New York

- 98th Fighter-Interceptor Squadron, 8 March 1956 – 1 October 1956

Dover Air Force Base, Delaware

- 105th Fighter-Interceptor Squadron, 6 February 1952 – 5 August 1952

Berry Field, Tennessee ontil c. 1 Jully 1952, then McGhee Tyson Municipal Airport

- 118th Fighter-Interceptor Squadron, 6 February 1952 – 1 November 1952

Suffolk County Air Force Base, New York

- 330th Fighter-Interceptor Squadron, 27 November 1952 – 20 September 1954

Sewart Air Force Base, New York

- 332d Fighter-Interceptor Squadron, 18 August 1955 – 1 October 1956
- 539th Fighter-Interceptor Squadron, 18 August 1955 – 1 October 1956

Support Squadrons

- 74th Air Base Squadron

Berry Field, Tennessee, 1 February 1952, McGhee Tyson Municipal Airport ca. 1 July 1952 – 5 August 1952

- 77th Air Base Squadron

Suffolk County Air Force Base, New York, 1 February 1952 – 16 February 1953

Radar Squadrons

- 646th Aircraft Control and Warning Squadron, 16 February 1953 – 18 October 1956

Navesink (later Highlands Air Force Station), New Jersey

- 648th Aircraft Control and Warning Squadron, 30 June 1953 – 1 July 1956

Ricketts Glen State Park (later Benton Air Force Station), Pennsylvania

- 770th Aircraft Control and Warning Squadron, 1 March 1956 – 18 October 1956

Palermo Air Force Station, New Jersey

- 773d Aircraft Control and Warning Squadron, 18 February 1953 – 1 March 1956; 1 July 1956 – 18 October 1956

Camp Hero (later Montauk Air Force Station), New York

=== Stations ===
- McGuire Air Force Base, New Jersey, 1 February 1952 – 1 October 1956

=== Aircraft ===
- F-47D, 1952
- F-47N, 1952
- F-80C, 1952–1953
- F-84G, 1953
- F-86A, 1952–1953
- F-86D, 1953–1956
- F-86F, 1952–1953
- F-89D, 1956
- F-94A, 1952–1953
- F-94C, 1956

=== Commanders ===
- Col. Charles B. Downer, 1 February 1952 – unknown

== See also ==
- List of MAJCOM wings of the United States Air Force
- List of United States Air Force Aerospace Defense Command Interceptor Squadrons
- List of United States Air Force aircraft control and warning squadrons
