= 330th Fighter-Interceptor Squadron =

United States Air Force military unit

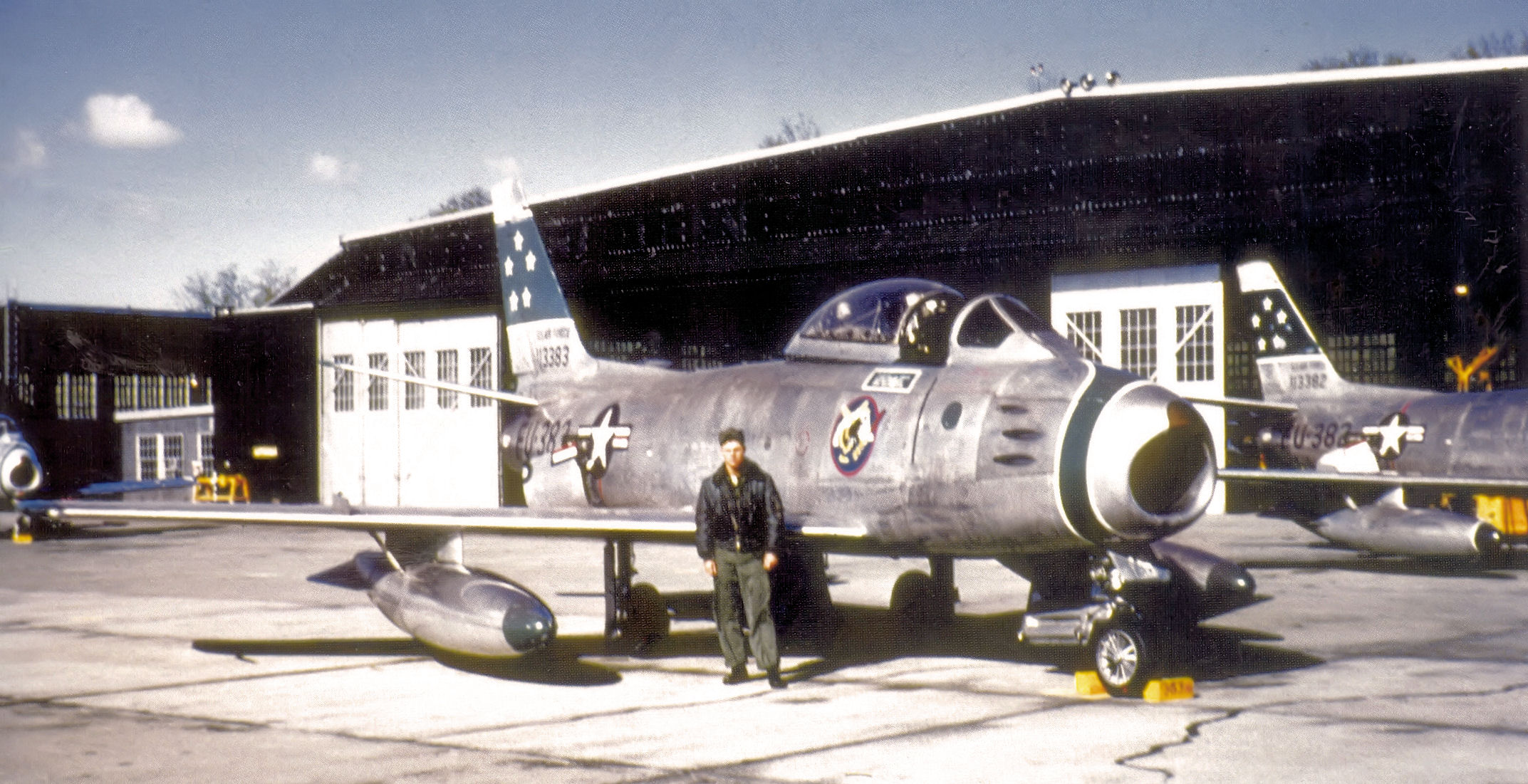
- 330th Squadron F-86 Sabre at Stewart AFB (Note: Aircraft is North American F-86F-25-NH Sabre serial 51-13383 in 1954. This plane was transferred to the 4700th Air Defense Wing and was written off charge on 16 January 1955 at Clovis AFB, New Mexico. Dirkx, Marco (21 June 2024). "1951 USAF Serial Numbers". Joe Baugher’s Serial Number List.)
- Active: 1942–1959
- Country: United States
- Branch: United States Air Force
- Role: Fighter interceptor

Insignia
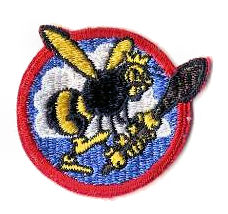
- Patch with 330th Fighter-Interceptor Squadron emblem (Note: Approved 4 March 1944. Description: Over and through a medium blue disc, border white, edged red a caricatured black and yellow king bee with a look of ferocity on face, grasping a large brown club, all in front of a large white cloud formation.)

The 330th Fighter-Interceptor Squadron is an inactive United States Air Force unit. Its last assignment was with the 329th Fighter Group at Stewart Air Force Base, New York, where it was inactivated on 1 July 1959.

It was first active as the 330th Fighter Squadron during World War II, serving as an Operational Training Unit and later as a Replacement Training Unit until being disbanded in a general reorganization of Army Air Forces in the spring of 1944. It was reactivated in November 1942 as an air defense unit.

== History ==
=== World War II ===
Trained replacement pilots, September 1942 – March 1944; furnished cadres for fighter squadrons, January–December 1943.; served as part of air defense force for the west coast, 1943.

=== Cold War air defense ===
Air defense of the Northeastern United States, 1954–1967.

== Lineage ==
- Constituted as the 330th Fighter Squadron (Two Engine) on 24 June 1942

Activated on 10 July 1942
Disbanded on 31 March 1944

- Reconstituted and redesignated 330th Fighter-Interceptor Squadron on 14 November 1952

Activated on 27 November 1952
Inactivated on 1 July 1959

=== Assignments ===
- 329th Fighter Group, 10 July 1942 – 31 March 1944
- 4709th Defense (later Air Defense) Wing, 27 November 1952
- 4700th Air Defense Group, 20 September 1954
- 329th Fighter Group, 18 August 1955 – 1 July 1959

=== Stations ===
- Hamilton Field, California, 10 July 1942
- Paine Field, Washington, 14 July 1942
- Glendale Army Air Base, California, 10 September 1942
- Lindbergh Field, California, 2 November 1942 – 31 March 1944
- Stewart Air Force Base, New York, 27 November 1952 – 1 July 1959

=== Aircraft ===
- Lockheed P-38 Lightning, 1942–1944
- Lockheed F-80 Shooting Star, 1952–1953
- North American F-86D Sabre, 1953–1959
