= 331st Fighter-Interceptor Squadron =

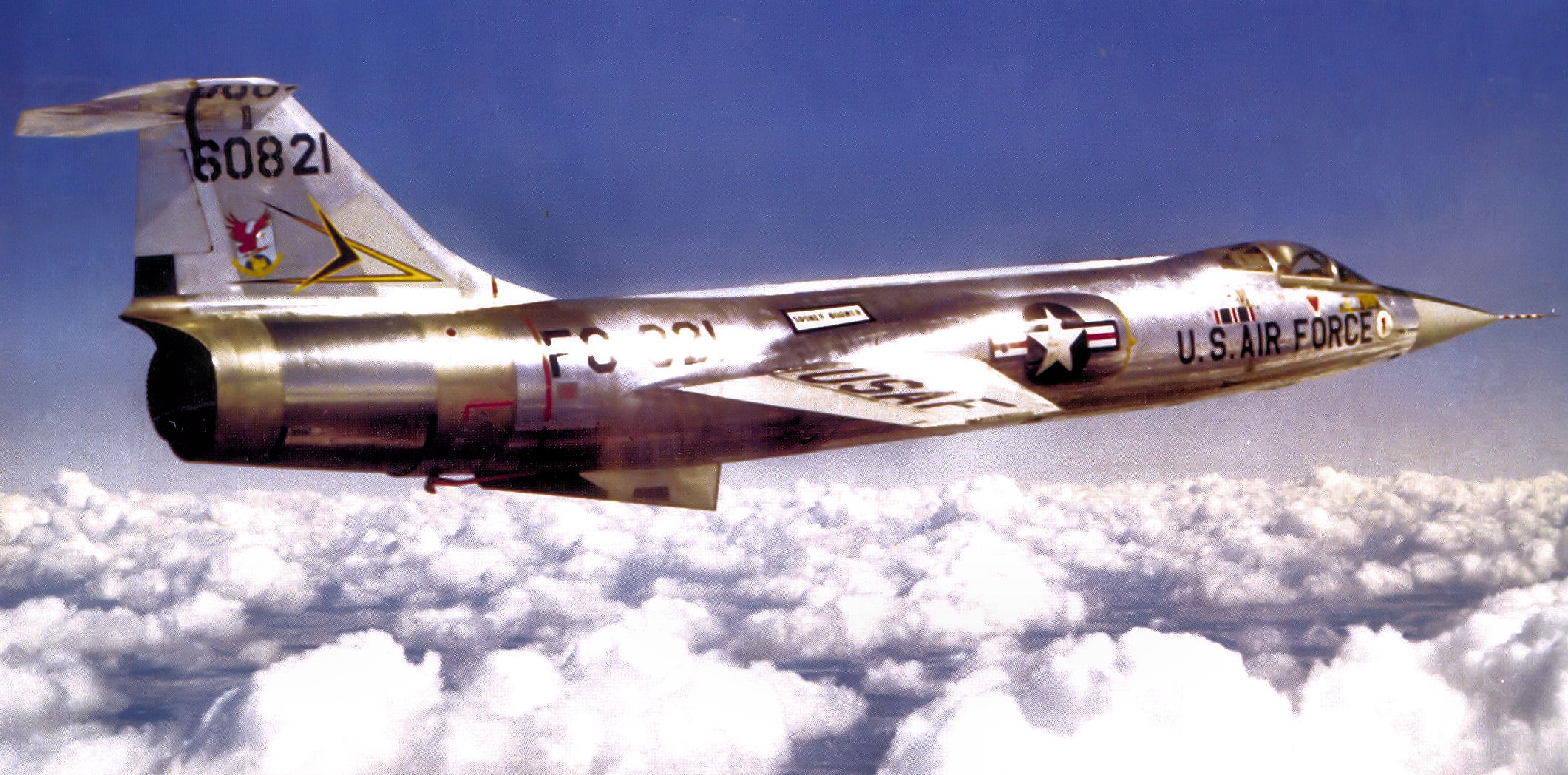
- 331st Fighter-Interceptor Squadron Lockheed F-104 Starfighter 56-821 at Webb AFB, Texas February 1964
- Active: 1942–1967
- Country: United States
- Branch: United States Air Force

Insignia
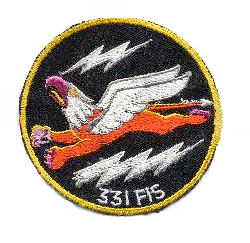
- Patch with 331st Fighter-Interceptor Squadron Emblem (Note: Approved 21 September 1954. Description: On a disc black, a stylized griffin courant; body, tongue, and eye shades of yellow; wings, head, and forked tail white, shaded gray; claws and beak, shades of red and purple between two lightning flashes white, shaded gray.)

The 331st Fighter-Interceptor Squadron is an inactive United States Air Force unit. Its last assignment was with Air Defense Command at Webb Air Force Base, Texas, where it was inactivated on 1 March 1967.

During World War II the squadron was a Lockheed P-38 Lightning Replacement Training Unit on the west coast of the United States. It performed this mission until it was disbanded in 1944 in a major reorganization of Army Air Forces training and support units.

The squadron was reactivated in 1953 as part of the expansion on air defenses and served in this role from bases in New York until 1958, when it moved to Texas. In Texas it assumed the additional mission of combat crew training for Lockheed F-104 Starfighter pilots.

== History ==
=== World War II ===
The squadron was first activated in 1942 as the 331st Fighter Squadron, one of the three original squadrons of the 329th Fighter Group. The squadron served under IV Fighter Command as a Lockheed P-38 Lightning Replacement Training Unit (RTU). RTUs were oversized units which trained aircrews prior to their deployment to combat theaters. It trained P-38 pilots in California and Washington State. However, the Army Air Forces found that standard military units, based on relatively inflexible tables of organization were proving less well adapted to the training mission. Accordingly, a more functional system was adopted in which each base was organized into a separate numbered unit. This resulted in the 331st, along with other units at Ellensburg Army Airfield, being disbanded in the spring of 1944 and replaced by an Army Air Forces Base Unit.

=== Cold War Air Defense ===
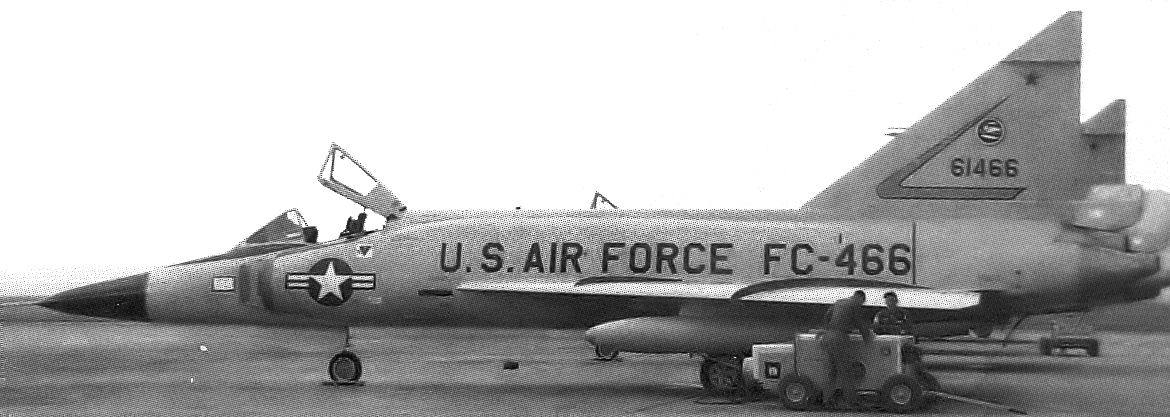
Convair F-102A-80-CO Delta Dagger 56-1466, 1962

The 331st was reconstituted as the 331st Fighter-Interceptor Squadron and activated in 1953 at Suffolk County Air Force Base as an Air Defense Command (ADC) interceptor squadron. The squadron was initially equipped with radar equipped and Mighty Mouse rocket armed North American F-86D Sabres. In the summer of 1955 ADC implemented Project Arrow, which was designed to bring back on the active list the fighter units which had compiled memorable records in the two world wars. As part of this reorganization, the 331st's World War II headquarters, the 329th Fighter Group, was reactivated at Stewart Air Force Base. The squadron moved to Stewart on paper, and assumed the mission, personnel and F-86D aircraft of the 539th Fighter-Interceptor Squadron. In December 1956, the squadron began to receive upgraded F-86L Sabres equipped with data link communications equipment to interface with the Semi Automatic Ground Environment (SAGE) air defense system.

In 1958, the 331st returned to flying F-86Ds and moved to Webb AFB, Texas for air defense of south central United States. It reequipped with Convair F-102 Delta Daggers in 1960. At the beginning of the Cuban Missile Crisis on 22 October 1962, the squadron deployed eighteen F-102s to Homestead Air Force Base, Florida. These planes were soon replaced by planes from the 325th Fighter-Interceptor Squadron. Truax's F-102s were the only Delta Daggers in ADC that had not been modified to carry the nuclear armed GAR-11 Falcon and were more suited to the Homestead mission.

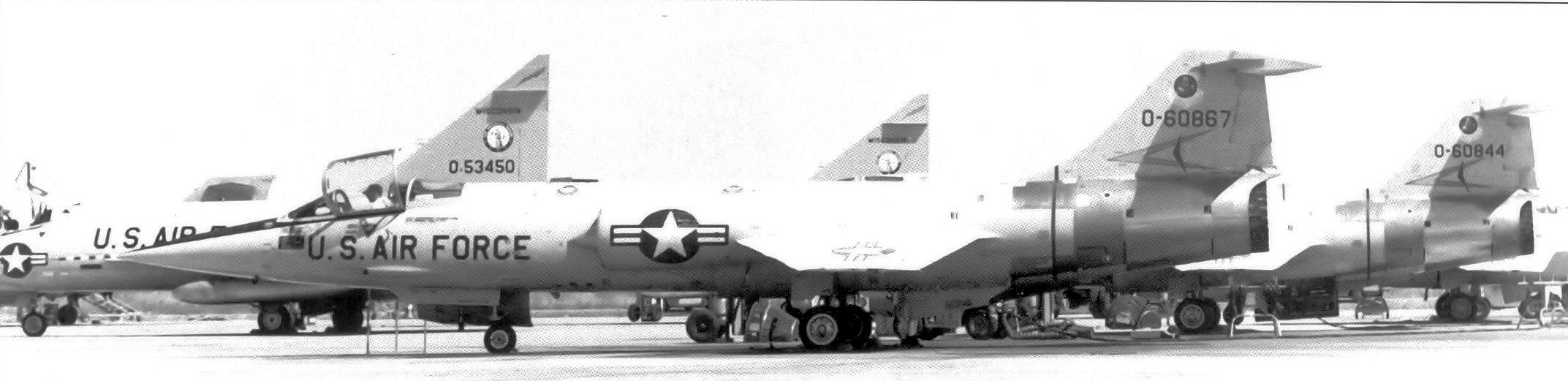
4760th Combat Crew Training Squadron F-104s at Webb AFB

In 1963 the squadron received Lockheed F-104 Starfighters that had been assigned to the Air National Guard. Although the F-104A had been withdrawn from active service in 1960 because its fire control system was not compatible with the SAGE system, this did not affect the squadron while it operated from Webb, because the 4752d Air Defense Wing operated a manual NORAD Sector Combat Center. In addition to single-seat F-104As, the squadron received the two-seat, dual-control, combat trainer F-104B. The performance of the F-104B was almost identical to that of the F-104A, but the lower internal fuel capacity reduced its effective range considerably. The squadron served as the ADC combat crew training squadron for the F-104.

In May 1965, in connection with the United States intervention in the Dominican Civil War, the squadron deployed twelve F-104s to Ramey Air Force Base, Puerto Rico to help prevent Cuban intervention in the Dominican Republic. The squadron continued to fly F-104s until it was inactivated in 1967 and its personnel and F-104s transferred to the 4760th Combat Crew Training Squadron, which assumed the F-104 training mission for Royal Jordanian Air Force F-104 pilots. The 4760th was discontinued on 1 October 1967 when the Jordanian pilots were recalled because of the war with Israel.

== Lineage ==
- Constituted as the 331st Fighter Squadron (Two Engine) on 24 June 1942

Activated on 10 July 1942
Disbanded on 31 March 1944

- Reconstituted and redesignated 331st Fighter-Interceptor Squadron, on 3 February 1953

Activated on 24 February 1953
Inactivated 1 March 1967

=== Assignments ===
- 329th Fighter Group, 10 July 1942 – 31 March 1944
- 519th Air Defense Group, 24 February 1953
- 329th Fighter Group, 18 August 1955
- 33d Air Division, 15 August 1958
- Albuquerque Air Defense Sector, 1 January 1960
- Oklahoma City Air Defense Sector, 15 September 1960
- 4752d Air Defense Wing, 1 September 1961 – 1 March 1967

=== Stations ===
- Hamilton Field, California, 10 July 1942
- Paine Field, Washington, 14 July 1942
- Mines Field, California, 10 September 1942
- Van Nuys Army Air Field, California, 4 November 1942
- Olympia Army Air Field, Washington, 13 August 1943;
- Ellensburg Army Airfield, Washington, 1 November 1943
- Ontario Army Air Field, California, 27 December 1943 – 31 March 1944
- Suffolk County AFB, New York, 24 February 1953
- Stewart AFB, New York, 18 August 1955
- Webb AFB, Texas, 15 August 1958 – 1 March 1967

=== Aircraft ===
- Lockheed P-38 Lightning, 1942–1944
- North American F-51 Mustang, 1953
- North American F-86D Sabre, 1953–1956, 1958–1960
- North American F-86L Sabre, 1956–1958
- Convair F-102 Delta Dagger, 1960–1963
- Lockheed F-104 Starfighter, 1963–1967

== See also ==
- List of United States Air Force Aerospace Defense Command Interceptor Squadrons
- List of F-86 Sabre units
- List of Lockheed F-104 Starfighter operators
