= Coeranus =

Coeranus or Koiranos (Greek: Κοίρανος) may refer to:

- Coeranus (mythology) various
- Coeranus of Beroea Macedonian officer
- Coeranus of Miletus saved by a dolphin after a shipwreck
