= 4700th Air Defense Group =

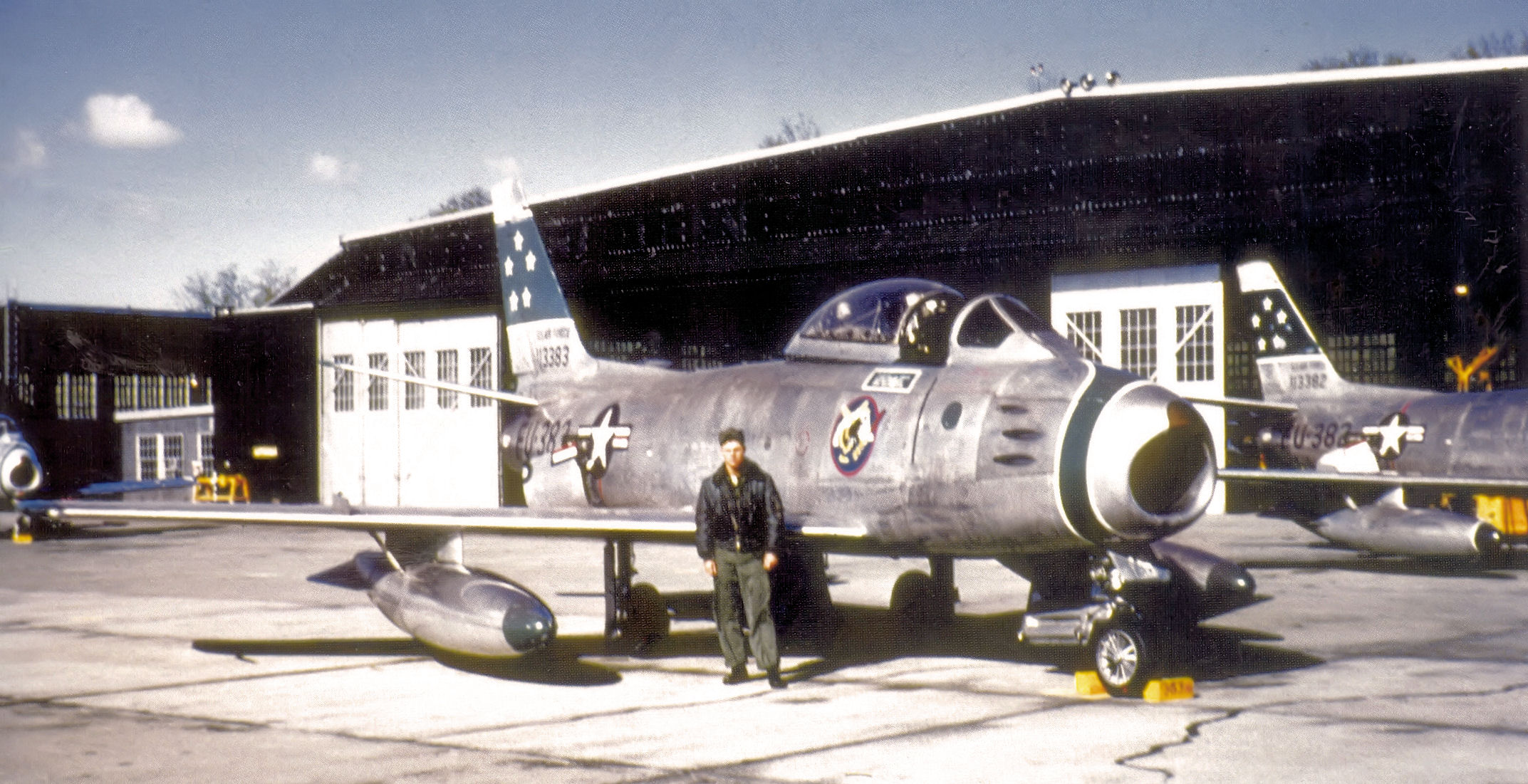
- F-86F Sabre of the group's 330th Fighter-Interceptor Squadron at Stewart AFB (Note: Aircraft is North American F-86F-25-NH Sabre, serial 51-13383. Taken in 1954. This plane was written off at Clovis Air Force Base on 16 January 1955. Dirkx, Marco (9 July 2025). "1951 USAF Serial Numbers". Joe Baugher’s Serial Number List..)
- Active: 1951–1955
- Country: United States
- Branch: United States Air Force
- Type: Fighter interceptor
- Role: Air defense

The 4700th Air Defense Group is a discontinued United States Air Force (USAF) organization. Its last assignment was with the 4709th Air Defense Wing at Stewart Air Force Base, New York. It was activated in 1950 as a support unit for USAF units at Stewart. In 1954, it assumed an operational mission and was assigned two interceptor squadrons. The group was discontinued on 18 August 1955 and its personnel and equipment were transferred to the 329th Fighter Group (Air Defense) as part of Project Arrow, an Air Defense Command project to replace air defense groups with fighter units with distinguished histories from World War I or World War II.

== History ==
The group was organized 1 December 1950 as the 4700th Air Base Group to replace the 4400th Air Base Group as the USAF host unit at Stewart Air Force Base, New York in preparation for the transfer of Stewart to Air Defense Command (ADC) from Continental Air Command (ConAC). It was assigned three squadrons to perform its duties as host. The 4700th was assigned to Eastern Air Defense Force. It transferred with Eastern Air Defense Force from ConAC to ADC upon ADC's reactivation in January 1951.

The 4700th was redesignated as an air defense group in 1954 and reassigned to the 4709th Air Defense Wing with responsibility for air defense of the New York City area. The group was assigned the 330th and 539th Fighter-Interceptor Squadrons, which were already stationed at Stewart, flying North American F-86 Sabre fighter aircraft, as its operational components. The 330th and 539th had been assigned directly to the 4709th Air Defense Wing. In January 1955, the 330th and 539th converted to more capable radar equipped and Folding-Fin Aerial Rocket-armed North American F-86D Sabres.

The group was replaced by the 329th Fighter Group in 1955 as part of ADC's Project Arrow, which was designed to bring back on the active list the fighter units which had compiled memorable records in the two world wars.

== Lineage ==
- Designated and organized as the 4700th Air Base Group on 1 December 1950
- Redesignated 4700th Air Defense Group on 20 September 1954
- Discontinued on 18 August 1955

=== Assignments ===
- Eastern Air Defense Force, 1 December 1950 – 20 September 1954
- 4709th Air Defense Wing, 20 September 1954 – 18 August 1955

=== Station ===
- Stewart Air Force Base, New York, 1 December 1950 – 18 August 1955

=== Components ===
- 330th Fighter-Interceptor Squadron, 20 September 1954 – 18 August 1955
- 539th Fighter-Interceptor Squadron, 20 September 1954 – 18 August 1955
- 612th USAF Infirmary, c. 18 April 1954 – 18 August 1955
- 4700th Installations Squadron 1 December 1950 – 18 August 1955
- 4700th Maintenance & Supply Squadron (later 4700th Materiel Squadron), 1 December 1950 – 18 August 1955
- 4700th Medical Squadron 1 December 1950 – c. 18 April 1954

=== Aircraft ===
- North American F-86D Sabre, 1955
- North American F-86F Sabre, 1954–1955

== See also ==
- List of Sabre and Fury units in the US military
- List of United States Air Force Aerospace Defense Command Interceptor Squadrons
