= 568th Air Defense Group =

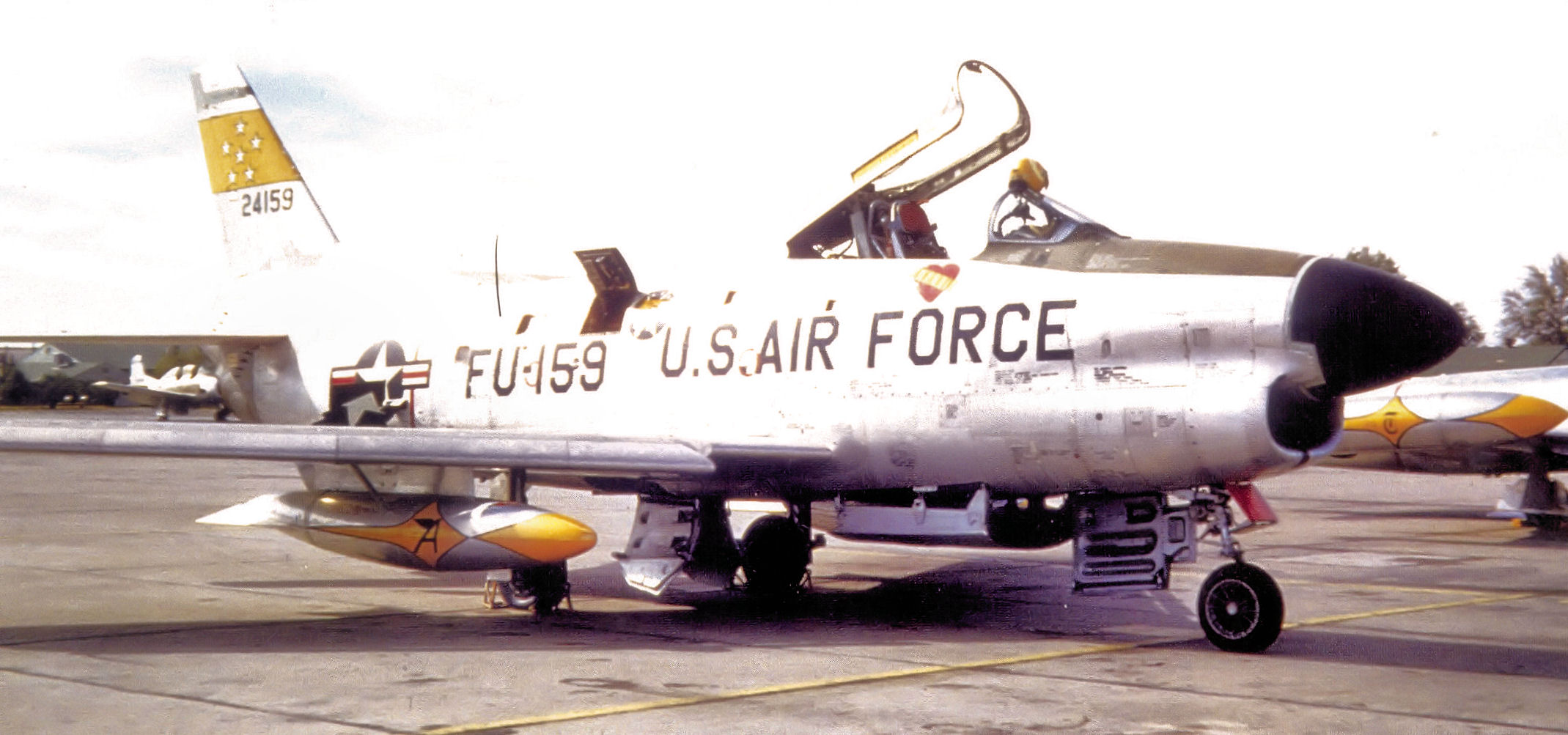
- 5th Fighter-Interceptor Squadron, F-86D Sabre at McGuire AFB (Note: Aircraft is North American F-86D-45-NA Sabre, serial 52-4159. Tanken in 1955. This airplane is on display at Morro Bay. California. Baugher, Joe (7 April 2023). "1952 USAF Serial Numbers". Joe Baugher.)
- Active: 1945–1946; 1952–1954
- Country: United States
- Branch: United States Air Force
- Type: Fighter interceptor
- Role: Air defense

The 568th Air Defense Group is a disbanded United States Air Force organization. Its last assignment was with Air Defense Command (ADC)'s 4709th Air Defense Wing at McGuire Air Force Base, New Jersey, where it was inactivated in 1954. The group was originally activated as the 568th Air Service Group, a support unit for a combat group at the end of World War II on Guam, but was soon inactivated.

The group was activated once again in 1952 at McGuire Air Force Base, New Jersey as the 568th Air Base Group to replace the support elements of the inactivating 52d Fighter-Interceptor Wing. A year later Air Defense Command ADC established it as an operational headquarters for fighter-interceptor squadrons as well. It was replaced in 1954 when ADC transferred host fundctions at McGuire to Military Air Transport Service and its operational squadrons were transferred to other ADC units.

== History ==
=== World War II ===
The group was activated on Guam toward the end of World War II as the 568th Air Service Group as part of a reorganization of Army Air Forces (AAF) support groups in which the AAF replaced service groups that included personnel from other branches of the Army and supported two combat groups with air service groups including only Air Corps units, designed to support a single combat group. Its 1031st Air Engineering Squadron provided maintenance that was beyond the capability of the combat group, its 1032nd Air Materiel Squadron handled all supply matters, and its Headquarters & Base Services Squadron provided other support. The unit provided support for one combat group in the Pacific Theater. It was disbanded in 1948.

=== Cold War ===
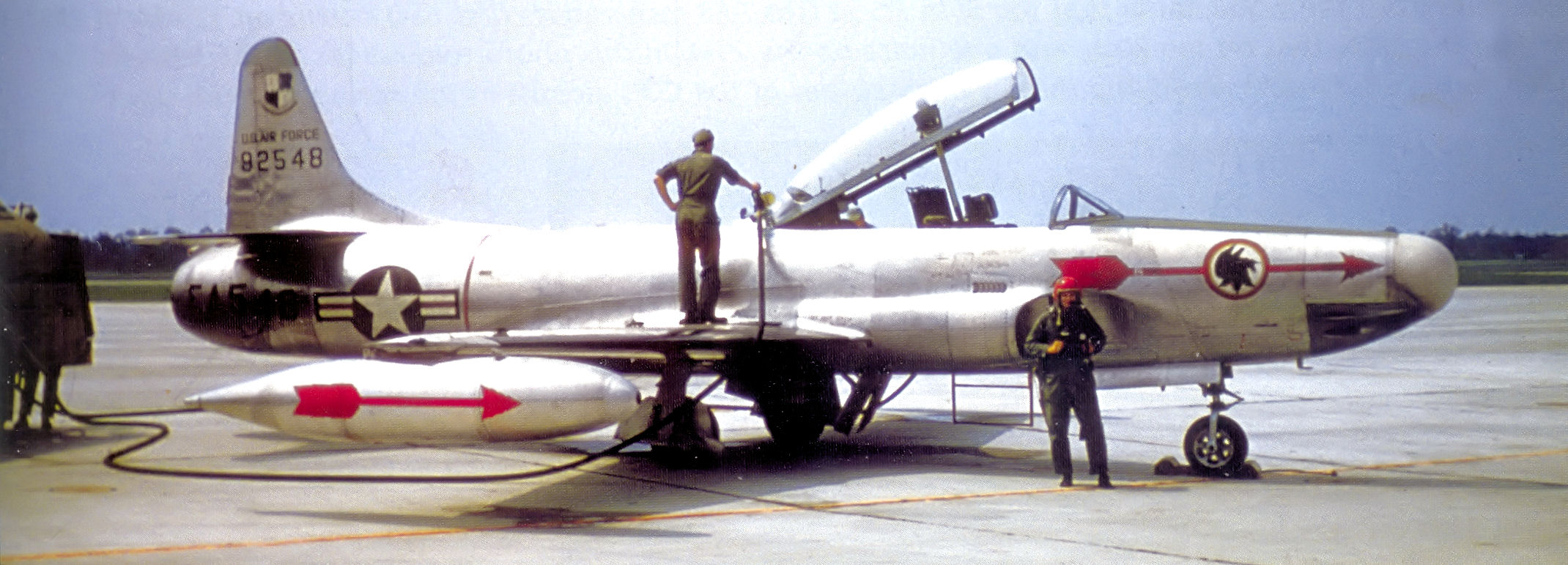
2d Fighter-Interceptor Squadron Lockheed F-94A (Note: Aircraft is Lockheed F-94A-5-LO Starfire, serial 49-2548 being refueled at McGuire AFB. This plane was transferred to the Maine Air National Guard and crashed on takeoff from Dow AFB, Maine on 4 August 1955 due to engine failure. Baugher, Joe (7 April 2023). "1949 USAF Serial Numbers". Joe Baugher.)

During the Cold War the group was reconstituted, redesignated as the 568th Air Base Group, and activated at McGuire Air Force Base, New Jersey in 1952 in a major reorganization of Air Defense Command (ADC) responding to ADC's difficulty under the existing wing base organizational structure in deploying fighter squadrons to the best tactical advantage. It replaced the 52nd Air Base Group as host unit for McGuire. The group was assigned seven squadrons to perform its support responsibilities. It also maintained aircraft stationed at McGuire.

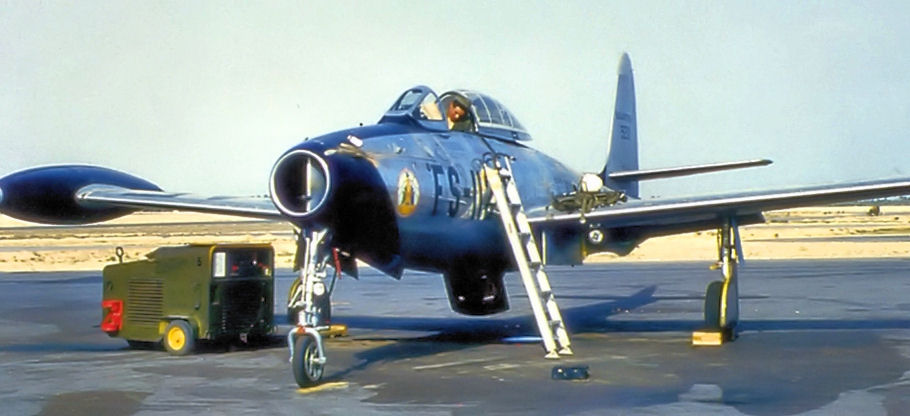
Republic F-84G as briefly flown by the 2d FIS

The group was redesignated as the 568th Air Defense Group in 1953 and assumed responsibility for air defense of Northeast United States. It was assigned the 2d and 5th Fighter-Interceptor Squadrons (FIS), flying early radar equipped and 20mm cannon armed Lockheed F-94 Starfire aircraft from the 4709th Defense Wing as its operational elements. The 2nd and 5th FIS were already stationed at McGuire. The same month that it transferred to the 568th, the 2nd FIS briefly traded its F-94s for Republic F-84 Thunderjet Aircraft. Both the 2nd and 5th FIS converted to radar equipped and Mighty Mouse rocket armed North American F-86 Sabres in July 1953.

In 1954, McGuire AFB transferred from ADC to Military Air Transport Service, and the group was inactivated. The group's support components were replaced by elements of the 1611th Air Transport Wing Its operational flying squadrons were assigned back to the 4709th Air Defense Wing. The group was disbanded once again in 1984.

== Lineage ==
- Constituted as the 568th Air Service Group

Activated c. 5 June 1945
Inactivated c. 31 May 1946
Disbanded on 8 October 1948

- Reconstituted and redesignated as 568th Air Base Group on 1 January 1952

Activated on 1 February 1952

- Redesignated 568th Air Defense Group on 16 February 1953

Inactivated on 8 July 1954
Disbanded on 27 September 1984

=== Assignments ===
- Twentieth Air Force, 1945–1946
- 4709th Air Defense Wing, 1 February 1952 – 8 July 1954

=== Components ===
==== Operational Squadrons ====
- 2d Fighter-Interceptor Squadron, 16 February 1953 – 8 July 1954
- 5th Fighter-Interceptor Squadron, 16 February 1953 – 8 July 1954

==== Support Squadrons ====
- 568th Air Police Squadron, 1 February 1952 – 8 July 1954
- 568th Food Service Squadron, 1 February 1952 – 8 July 1954
- 568th Field Maintenance Squadron, 1 February 1952 – 8 July 1954
- 568th Installations Squadron, 1 February 1952 – 8 July 1954
- 568th Medical Squadron (later 568th USAF Dispensary, 568th USAF Hospital), 1 February 1952 – 8 July 1954
- 568th Motor Vehicle Squadron, 1 February 1952 – 8 July 1954
- 568th Operations Squadron, 1 February 1952 – 8 July 1954
- 568th Supply Squadron, 1 February 1952 – 8 July 1954
- 1031st Air Engineering Squadron, ca. 5 June 1945 – ca. 31 May 1946
- 1032nd Air Materiel Squadron, ca. 5 June 1945 – ca. 31 May 1946

=== Stations ===
- Guam, Mariana Islands, 1945 – 1946
- McGuire Air Force Base, New Jersey, 1 February 1952 – 8 July 1954

=== Aircraft ===
- Republic F-84G Thunderjet, 1953
- North American F-86D Sabre, 1953–1954
- Lockheed F-94A Starfighter, 1953

== See also ==
- Aerospace Defense Command Fighter Squadrons
- List of F-86 Sabre units
- F-94 Starfire units of the United States Air Force
