= 329th =

329th may refer to:

- 329th Armament Systems Group, inactive United States Air Force unit, inactivated in 2007
- 329th Combat Crew Training Squadron, inactive United States Air Force unit
- 329th Fighter-Interceptor Squadron, inactive United States Air Force unit
- 329th Infantry Regiment (United States), unit of the United States Army during World War II

== See also ==
- 329 (number)
- 329, the year 329 (CCCXXIX) of the Julian calendar
- 329 BC
