= 539th Fighter-Interceptor Squadron =

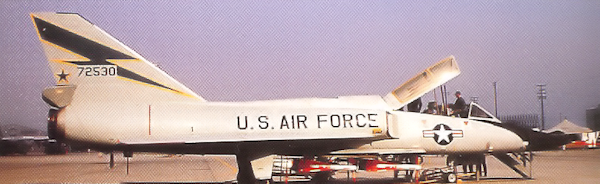
- Squadron F-106 Delta Dart with a load of AIM-4 Falcons (Note: Aircraft is Convair F-106B Delta Dart, serial 57-2530, taken at McGuire AFB about 1966.)
- Active: 1943–1944; 1954–1967
- Country: United States
- Branch: United States Air Force
- Role: Fighter-Interceptor
- Nickname: World's Finest
- Motto: Iron Hand

Insignia
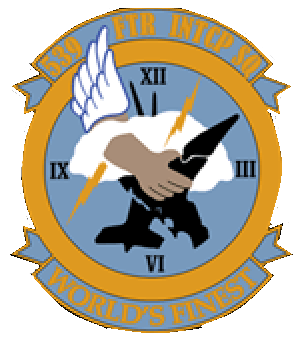
- 539th Fighter-Interceptor Squadron emblem (Note: Approved 9 December 1954.)

The 539th Fighter-Interceptor Squadron is an inactive United States Air Force unit. Its last assignment was with the 26th Air Division at McGuire Air Force Base, New Jersey, where it was inactivated on 31 August 1967.

During World War II, the squadron was activated in 1943 as a Replacement Training Unit, and served until 1944 when it was disbanded when the Army Air Forces reorganized its training and support units in the United States. It was reactivated as a fighter interceptor unit in 1954, and served in that role, first with various models of the North American F-86 Sabre, then with the Convair F-106 Delta Dart until inactivating.

== History ==
=== World War II ===
The 539th Fighter Squadron was activated in October 1943 at Westover Field, Massachusetts as one of the original squadrons of the 402d Fighter Group. Shortly after activation, the squadron moved to Seymour Johnson Field, North Carolina where it operated as a Replacement Training Unit (RTU) for Republic P-47 Thunderbolt pilots. RTUs were oversized units whose mission was to train individual pilots or aircrews. In December 1943, the squadron again moved, this time to Bluethenthal Field, North Carolina, and was assigned to the 326th Fighter Group.

However, the Army Air Forces was finding that standard military units, based on relatively inflexible tables of organization were not proving well adapted to the training mission. Accordingly, it adopted a more functional system in which each base was organized into a separate numbered unit. In this reorganization the 539th was disbanded and, along with the other operational and support units at Bluethenthal, replaced by the 124th AAF Base Unit (Fighter).

=== Air Defense Command ===
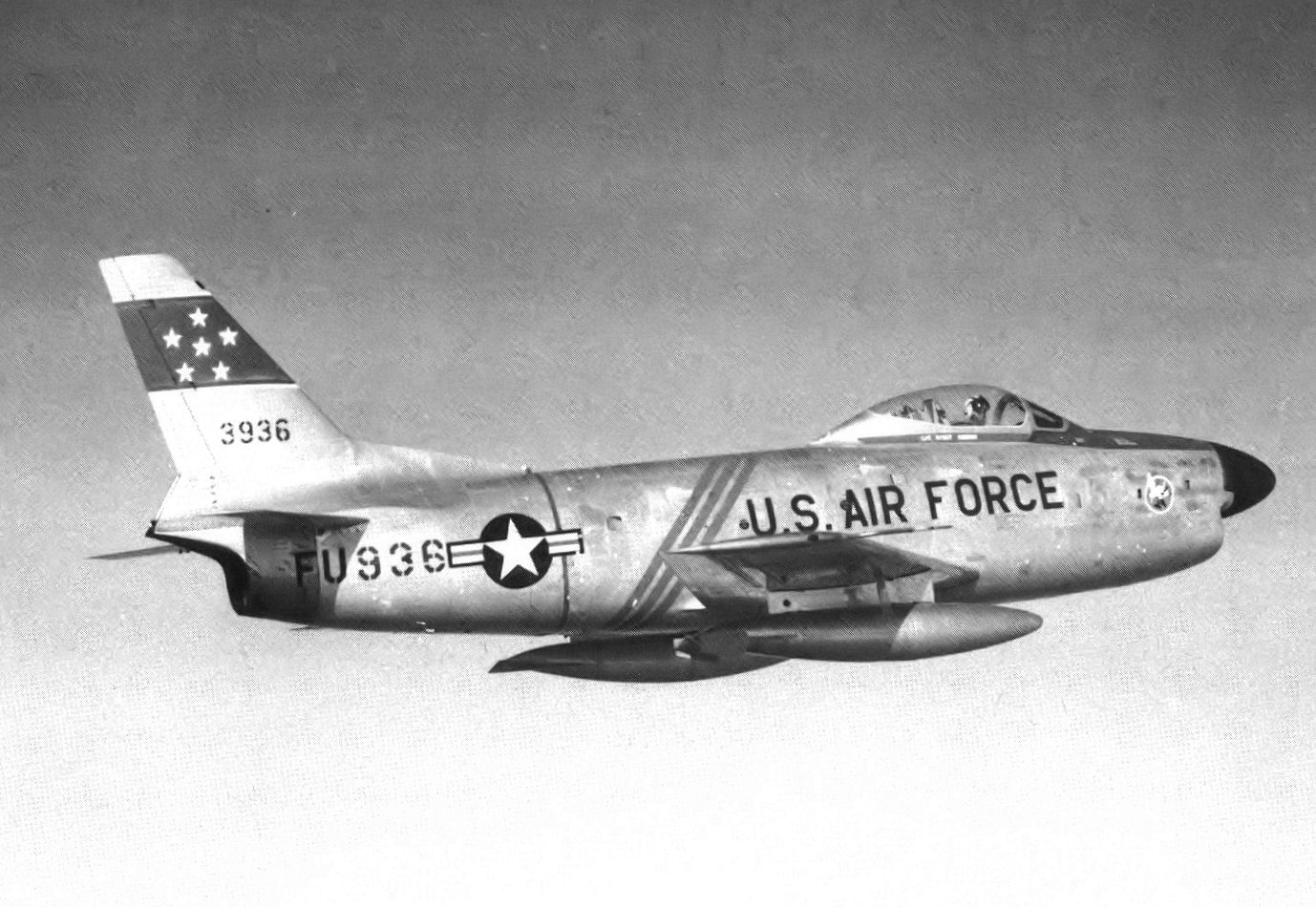
North American F-86D Sabre 52-3936 at Stewart AFB in 1954

The squadron was redesignated the 539th Fighter-Interceptor Squadron and reactivated at Stewart Air Force Base, New York and assigned to the 4709th Defense Wing of Air Defense Command. (Note: The squadron was the highest numbered fighter squadron activated in Air Defense Command. Cornett & Johnson, pp.130–131.) It was originally equipped with North American F-86F Sabres, but in January 1955 it received North American F-86D Sabres, equipped with a more powerful air intercept radar and armed with Folding-Fin Aerial Rockets.

In August 1955, in connection with the unit realignments of Project Arrow, (Note: ADC's Project Arrow was designed to bring back on the active list the fighter units which had compiled memorable records in the two world wars. Buss, et al., p. 6) the unit transferred its personnel and equipment to the 331st Fighter-Interceptor Squadron and moved on paper to McGuire Air Force Base, where it took over the personnel of the 5th Fighter-Interceptor Squadron. At McGuire, the squadron received F-86L's, with data link for interception control through the Semi-Automatic Ground Environment system. In May 1959 the squadron was one of the earliest to transition into Convair F-106 Delta Darts, armed with the AIM-4 Falcon missile.

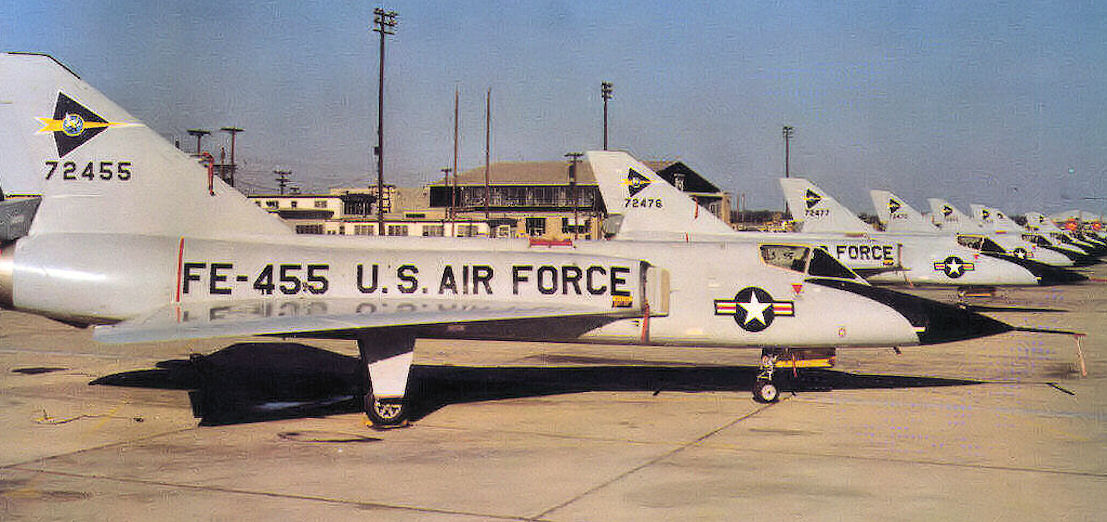
F-106A about 1960, with marking of a triangle pierced by a chevron

On 22 October 1962, before President John F. Kennedy informed Americans that missiles were in place in Cuba, the squadron dispersed one third of its force, equipped with nuclear tipped missiles, to Olmsted Air Force Base at the start of the Cuban Missile Crisis. These planes returned to McGuire and resumed their normal alert posture after the crisis.

Although the number of ADC interceptor squadrons remained almost constant in the early 1960s, attrition (and the fact that production lines closed in 1961) caused a gradual drop in the number of planes assigned to a squadron, from 24 to around 18 by 1964. The force reduction continued, finally resulting in a reduction in the number of interceptor units, and the 539th was inactivated on 31 August 1967.

== Lineage ==
- Constituted as the 539th Fighter Squadron on 24 September 1943

Activated on 1 October 1943

- Disbanded on 10 April 1944
- Reconstituted and redesignated 539th Fighter-Interceptor Squadron on 23 March 1953
- Activated on 18 April 1954
- Inactivated on 31 August 1967

=== Assignments ===
- 402d Fighter Group, 1 October 1943
- 326th Fighter Group, 25 November 1943 – 10 April 1944
- 4709th Defense Wing (later 4709th Air Defense Wing), 18 April 1954
- 4700th Air Defense Group, 20 September 1954
- 4709th Air Defense Wing, 18 August 1955
- 4621st Air Defense Wing (later New York Air Defense Sector), 1 October 1956
- 4730th Air Defense Group, 8 February 1957
- New York Air Defense Sector, 1 August 1959
- 26th Air Division, 1 April 1966 – 23 August 1967

=== Stations ===
- Westover Field, Massachusetts, 1 October 1943
- Seymour Johnson Field, North Carolina, 13 October 1943
- Bluethenthal Field, North Carolina, 8 December 1943 – 10 April 1944
- Stewart Air Force Base, New York, 18 April 1954
- McGuire Air Force Base, New Jersey, 18 August 1955 – 31 August 1967

=== Aircraft ===
- Republic P-47 Thunderbolt, 1944
- North American F-86F Sabre, 1954
- North American F-86D Sabre, 1954–1955
- North American F-86L Sabre, 1955–1959
- Convair F-106 Delta Dart, 1959–1967
