= 329th Armament Systems Group =

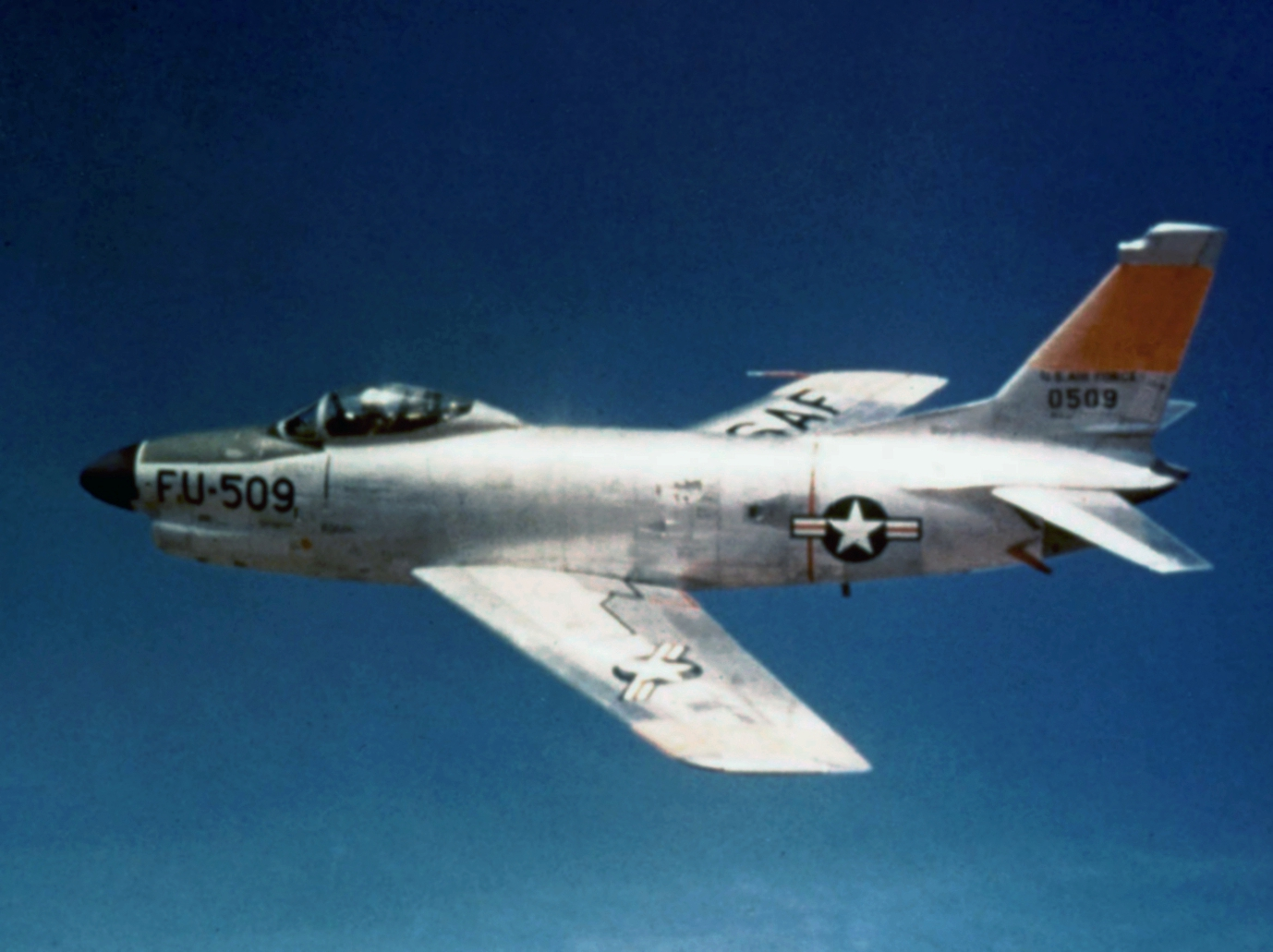
- North American F-86D
- Active: 1942–1944, 1955–1959, 2005–2007
- Country: United States
- Branch: United States Air Force
- Role: Systems development
- Part of: Air Force Materiel Command

Insignia
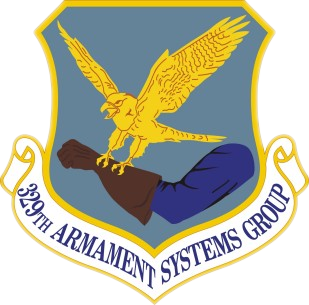
- 329th Armament Systems Group (Note: Approved 25 July 1957. Description: On a background of the sky proper, a sinister arm embowed, fessways, issuing from sinister, habited azure, with leather falconer's glove proper, a falcon or, perched for flight on the gloved hand.)

The 329th Armament Systems Group is an inactive United States Air Force unit, last assigned to the Air Armament Center at Eglin Air Force Base, Florida. It was inactivated in 2007.

The group was first activated in July 1942 as the 329th Fighter Group. It acted as an Operational Training Unit for fighter units and as a Replacement Training Unit for Lockheed P-38 Lightning pilots deploying to overseas theaters until 1944, when it was disbanded in a major reorganization of the Army Air Forces training units.

The group was activated again as part of Project Arrow, a program by Air Defense Command (ADC) to revive World War II fighter units to replace its Air Defense Groups. It was inactivated in 1959 when ADC realigned its fighter force.

The Air Armament Systems Group was activated in 2005 as part of the Air Force Materiel Command Transformation, in which Air Force Materiel Command replaced its traditional directorates with wings, groups, and squadrons. The following year it was consolidated with the 329th Group as the 329th Armament Systems Group. It was inactivated in 2007 when the Air Armament Center combined its units into the 308th Armament Systems Wing.

== History ==
=== World War II ===
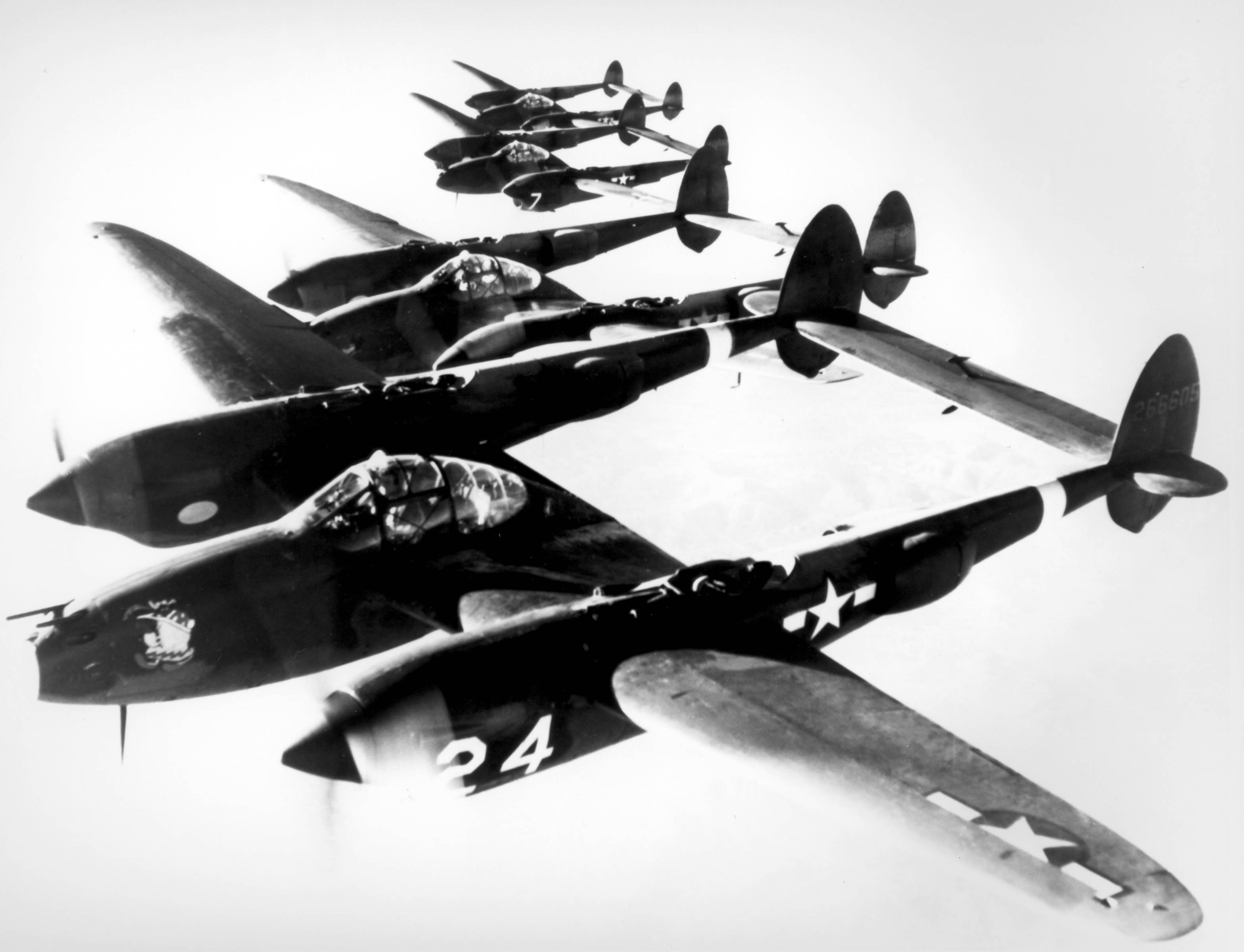
Formation of P-38 Lightnings

The group was activated at Hamilton Field in June 1942 under Fourth Air Force as the 329th Fighter Group, with the 330th, 331st, and 332d Fighter Squadrons assigned. Four days after its activation, the group moved to Paine Field, Washington. The group initially acted as an Operational Training Unit (OTU). The OTU program involved establishing an oversized parent unit which would provide cadres to organize "satellite groups." The group later served as a Replacement Training Unit, training Lockheed P-38 Lightning pilots in the final phases of fighter pilot training before shipping overseas.

In September 1942 the group headquarters moved to Grand Central Air Terminal, California along with the 330th Squadron, while the 331st Squadron moved to Inglewood, California, and the 332d to Santa Ana Army Air Base. From this time until it was disbanded, the group's squadrons would be dispersed over several bases in California and Washington. November 1942 saw another shuffle of squadrons as the 331st moved to Van Nuys Army Air Field. The group was expanded the same month when it was joined by the 337th Fighter Squadron. The 337th returned to the United States from Iceland, where its place was taken by the 50th Fighter Squadron. It took the place of the 330th at Grand Central. The 330th moved to Lindbergh Field, where it assumed an air defense mission in 1943. Most of the group eventually found itself at Ontario Army Air Field, California. The 331st and 337th Squadrons moved there in December 1943, and were joined by group headquarters in February 1944.

The group was disbanded in 1944 and its personnel and equipment at Ontario were transferred to the 442d AAF Base Unit (Replacement Training Unit, Fighter) as part of an Army Air Forces (AAF) reorganization in which units not programmed to deploy overseas were replaced by AAF Base Units in order to free up manpower for overseas assignment because standard military units, based on relatively inflexible tables of organization were not proving well adapted to the training mission. Accordingly, a more functional system was adopted in which each AAF base was organized into a separate numbered unit.

=== Cold War ===
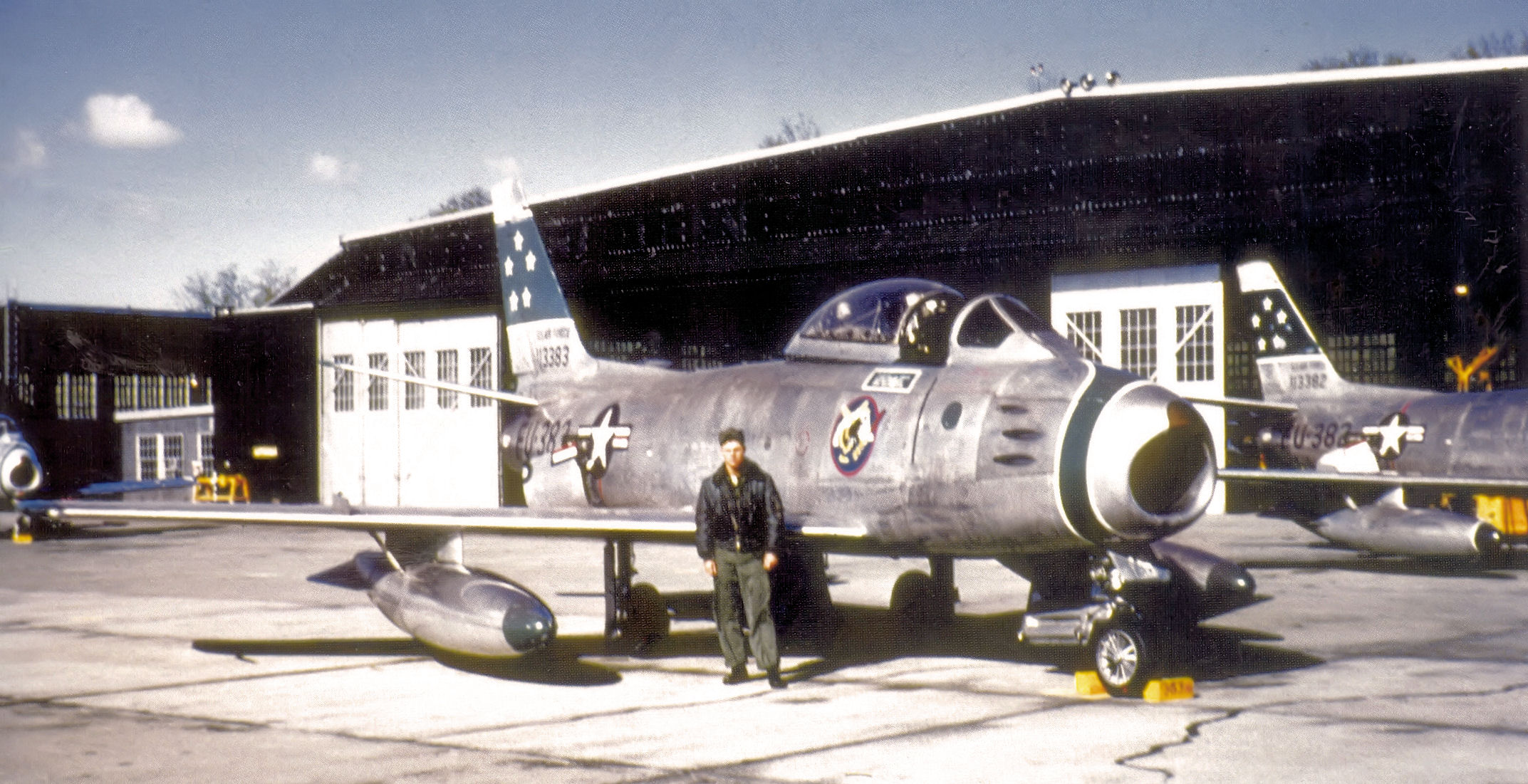
330th Fighter-Interceptor Squadron F-86 Sabre (Note: Aircraft is North American F-86F-25-NH Sabre serial 51-13383. The 330th was converting to radar-equipped Sabres when assigned to the group.)

The group was reconstituted in 1955 as the 329th Fighter Group (Air Defense) and activated by Air Defense Command (ADC) as part of Project Arrow, which was designed to bring back on the active list fighter units which had compiled memorable records in the two world wars. The group replaced the 4700th Air Defense Group at Stewart Air Force Base and absorbed the 4700th's personnel and equipment. The 330th Fighter-Interceptor Squadron was reassigned to the 329th, and the 331st Fighter-Interceptor Squadron replaced the 539th Fighter-Interceptor Squadron, which moved to McGuire Air Force Base, New Jersey, since another purpose of Project Arrow was to reunite fighter groups with their traditional squadrons. The group was tasked with air defense in the northeastern United States, flying radar equipped and Mighty Mouse rocket armed North American F-86D Sabres. The group also served as the host organization for all USAF units stationed at Stewart and was assigned a number of support organizations to fulfil this mission.

In December 1956, both of the group's squadrons began to receive upgraded Sabres equipped with data link communications equipment to interface with the Semi Automatic Ground Environment (SAGE) air defense system. The group was reduced to a single operational squadron in August 1958, when the 331st Squadron moved to Webb Air Force Base, Texas and was reassigned. In July of the following year, its remaining operational squadron was inactivated and the group followed the next month and its support functions at Stewart were assumed by the 4603d Air Base Group.

=== Armament systems development ===
In 2005, the Air Combat Support Systems Group was established as a systems development unit at Eglin Air Force Base, Florida as part of the Air Force Materiel Command Transformation, which replaced traditional program offices with named wings, groups, and squadrons. In May 2006, this named group was consolidated with the 329th Group and on 15 May became the 329th Armament Systems Group. Its subordinate squadrons were simultaneously given numbers to replace their previous squadron names.

The 329th Armament Systems Group was responsible for developing air combat test and training systems, expeditionary support equipment, munitions handling equipment and armament subsystems, explosive ordnance disposal support equipment, and realistic electronic warfare threat simulators for the United States and allied forces worldwide. In 2007 it began a study to develop a common instrumentation system for all Department of Defense ranges to ease the transfer of information among ranges, increase instrumentation accuracy and data transfer rates, and improve the encryption of transferred data.

The group was inactivated in September 2007, when the Air Armament Center combined its armament systems units into the 308th Armament Systems Wing.

== Lineage ==
329th Fighter Group

- Constituted as 329th Fighter Group on 24 June 1942

Activated on 10 July 1942
Redesignated 329th Fighter Group (Twin Engine) on 17 September 1942
Disbanded on 31 March 1944.

- Redesignated 329th Fighter Group (Air Defense), on 20 June 1955

Activated on 18 August 1955
Inactivated on 1 August 1959.

- Redesignated 329th Tactical Fighter Group on 31 July 1985 (remained inactive)
- Consolidated with Air Combat Support Systems Group as Air Combat Support Systems Group on 3 May 2006

Air Combat Support Systems Group

- Constituted as Air Combat Support Systems Group on 23 November 2004

Activated on 27 January 2005

- Consolidated with 329th Fighter Group (Air Defense) on 3 May 2006

Redesignated 329th Armament Systems Group on 15 May 2006
Inactivated on 7 September 2007

=== Assignments ===
- IV Fighter Command, 10 July 1942
- Los Angeles Air Defense Wing (later Los Angeles Fighter Wing), 12 April 1943
- Fourth Air Force, 1 March 1944 – 31 March 1944
- 4707th Air Defense Wing, 18 August 1955
- 4622d Air Defense Wing (later Boston Air Defense Sector), 18 October 1956 – 1 August 1959
- Air Armament Center, 27 January 2005 – 7 September 2007

=== Stations ===
- Hamilton Field, California, 10 July 1942
- Paine Field, Washington, 14 July 1942
- Grand Central Airport, California, 11 September 1942
- Ontario Army Airfield, California, 27 February – 31 March 1944
- Stewart Air Force Base, New York, 18 August 1955 – 1 August 1959
- Eglin Air Force Base, Florida, 27 January 2005 – 7 September 2007

=== Components ===
Operational Squadrons

- 330th Fighter Squadron (later 330th Fighter-Interceptor Squadron): 10 July 1942 – 31 March 1944, 18 August 1955 – 1 July 1959
- 331st Fighter Squadron (later 331st Fighter-Interceptor Squadron): 10 July 1942 – 31 March 1944, 18 August 1955 – 15 August 1958
- 332d Fighter Squadron: 10 July 1942 – 31 March 1944
- 337th Fighter Squadron: 26 November 1942 – 31 March 1944

Support Units

- 329th USAF Infirmary (later 329th USAF Dispensary), 18 August 1955 – 1 August 1959
- 329th Air Base Squadron, 18 August 1955 – 1 August 1959
- 329th Consolidated Aircraft Maintenance Squadron, 8 July 1957 – 1 August 1959
- 329th Materiel Squadron, 18 August 1955 – 1 August 1959

Systems Squadrons

- Agile Combat Support Systems Squadron (later 688th Armament Systems Squadron), 27 January 2005 – 7 September 2007
- Sensors, Data Link, & Ground Stations Systems Squadron (later 689th Armament Systems Squadron), 27 January 2005 – 7 September 2007

=== Aircraft ===
- Lockheed P-38 Lightning, 1942–1944
- North American F-86D Sabre, 1955–1959
- North American F-86L Sabre, 1956–1959

=== Campaigns ===
Campaign Streamer	Campaign	Dates	Notes
	American Theater without inscription	10 July 1943 – 31 March 1944	329th Fighter Group
