= Coeranus of Beroea =

Macedonian general of Alexander the Great

Coeranus of Beroea (Ancient Greek: Κοίρανος) was a Macedonian general of Alexander the Great, since the start of Asiatic expedition. Before the battle of Issus, when Harpalus fled to Greece, Alexander divided the control of the treasury between Coeranus and Philoxenus. Upon Harpalus' return to favor, Coeranus was appointed financial officer for Phoenicia, Cilicia, and Coele-Syria.

Arrian 3.12.4 calls the commander of the allied cavalry Coeranus. Possibly this is an error for Caranus.
