= North American F-86D Sabre =

USAF all-weather interceptor

F-86D/K/L Sabre
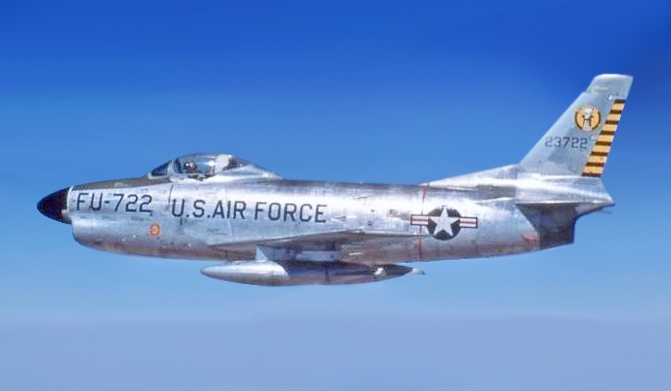
- A USAF North American F-86D

General information
- Type: All-weather fighter-interceptor
- National origin: United States
- Manufacturer: North American Aviation
- Primary users: United States Air Force Italian Air Force; SFR Yugoslav Air Force; Japanese Air Self-Defense Force
- Number built: 2,847

History
- Introduction date: 1951
- First flight: 22 December 1949, 77 years ago
- Retired: 1965 (U.S. Air National Guard); 1974 (SFR Yugoslav Air Force)
- Developed from: North American F-86 Sabre

The North American F-86D/K/L Sabre (initially known as the YF-95 and widely known informally as the "Sabre Dog") is an American transonic jet interceptor. While the original North American F-86 Sabre was conceived as a day fighter, the F-86D was specifically developed as an all-weather interceptor for the United States Air Force in the late 1940s. Originally designated as the YF-95 during development and testing, it was re-designated the F-86D before production began, despite only sharing 25% commonality of parts with the original F-86. Production models of the F-86D/K/L differed from other Sabres in that they had a larger fuselage, a larger afterburning engine, and a distinctive nose radome. The most-produced Sabre Dog variants (the "D" and "G" models) also mounted no guns, unlike the Sabre with its six M3 Browning .50 caliber machine guns, instead mounting unguided Folding-Fin Aerial Rocket (FFAR) “Mighty Mouse” rockets. The "K" and "L" Sabre Dog variants mounted four 20mm M24A1 cannon.

== Design and development ==
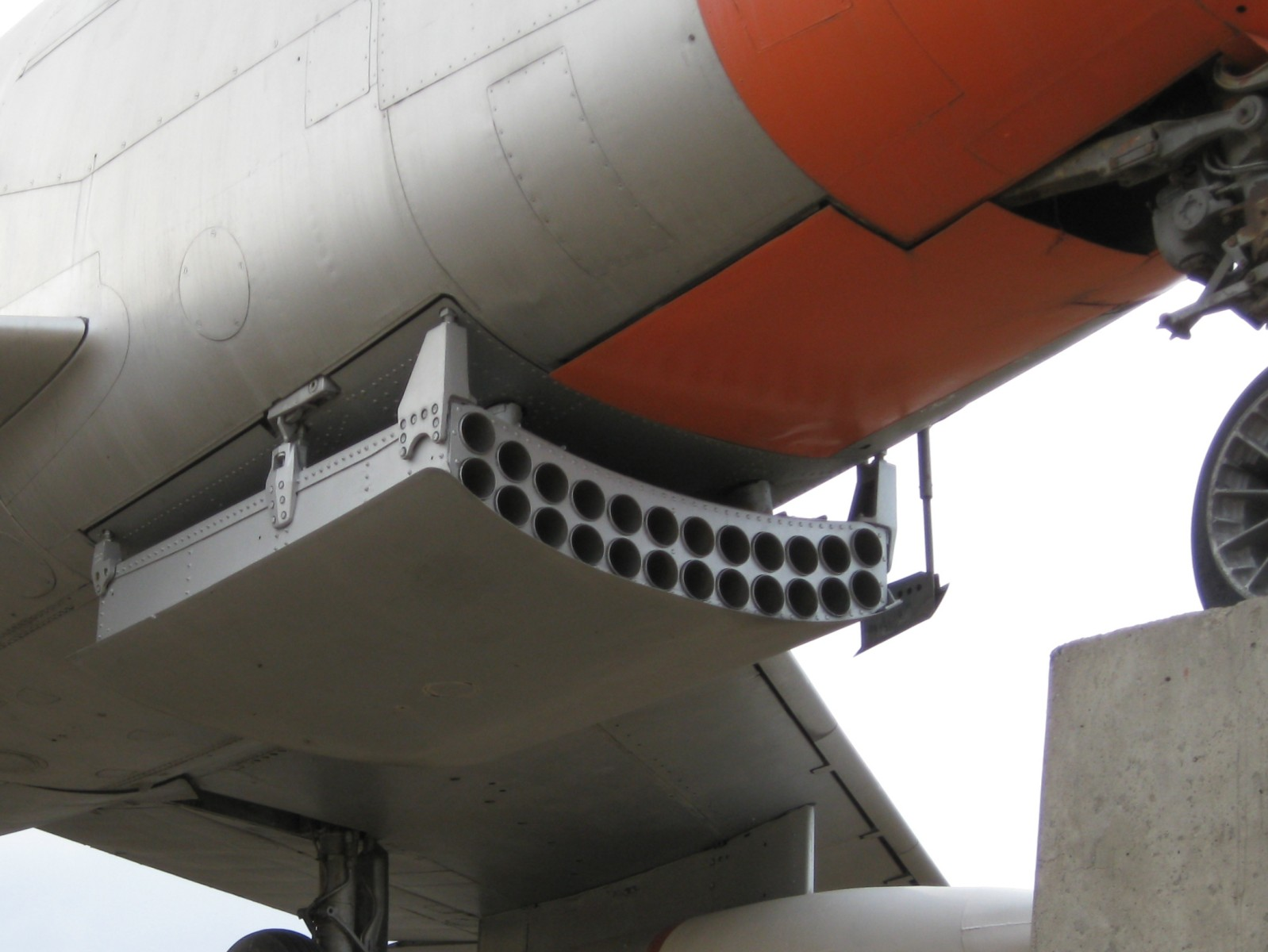
Rocket tray

The YF-95 was a development of the F-86 Sabre, the first aircraft designed around the new 2.75-inch (70 mm) "Mighty Mouse" Folding-Fin Aerial Rocket (FFAR). Begun in March 1949, the unarmed prototype, 50-577, first flew on 22 December 1949, piloted by North American test pilot George Welch and was the first U.S. Air Force night fighter design with only a single crewman and a single engine, a J47-GE-17 with afterburner rated at 5,425 lbf (24.1 kN) static thrust. Gun armament was eliminated in favor of a retractable under-fuselage tray carrying 24 unguided Mk. 4 rockets, then considered a more effective weapon against enemy bombers than automatic cannon fire. A second prototype, 50-578, was also built, but the YF-95 nomenclature was short-lived as the design was subsequently redesignated YF-86D.

The fuselage was wider and the airframe length increased to 40 ft 4 in (12.3 m), with a clamshell canopy, enlarged tail surfaces and AN/APG-36 all-weather radar fitted in a radome in the nose, above the intake. Later models of the F-86D received an uprated J-47-GE-33 engine rated at 5,550 lbf (24.7 kN) (from the F-86D-45 production blocks onward). A total of 2,504 D-models were built.

== Operational history ==
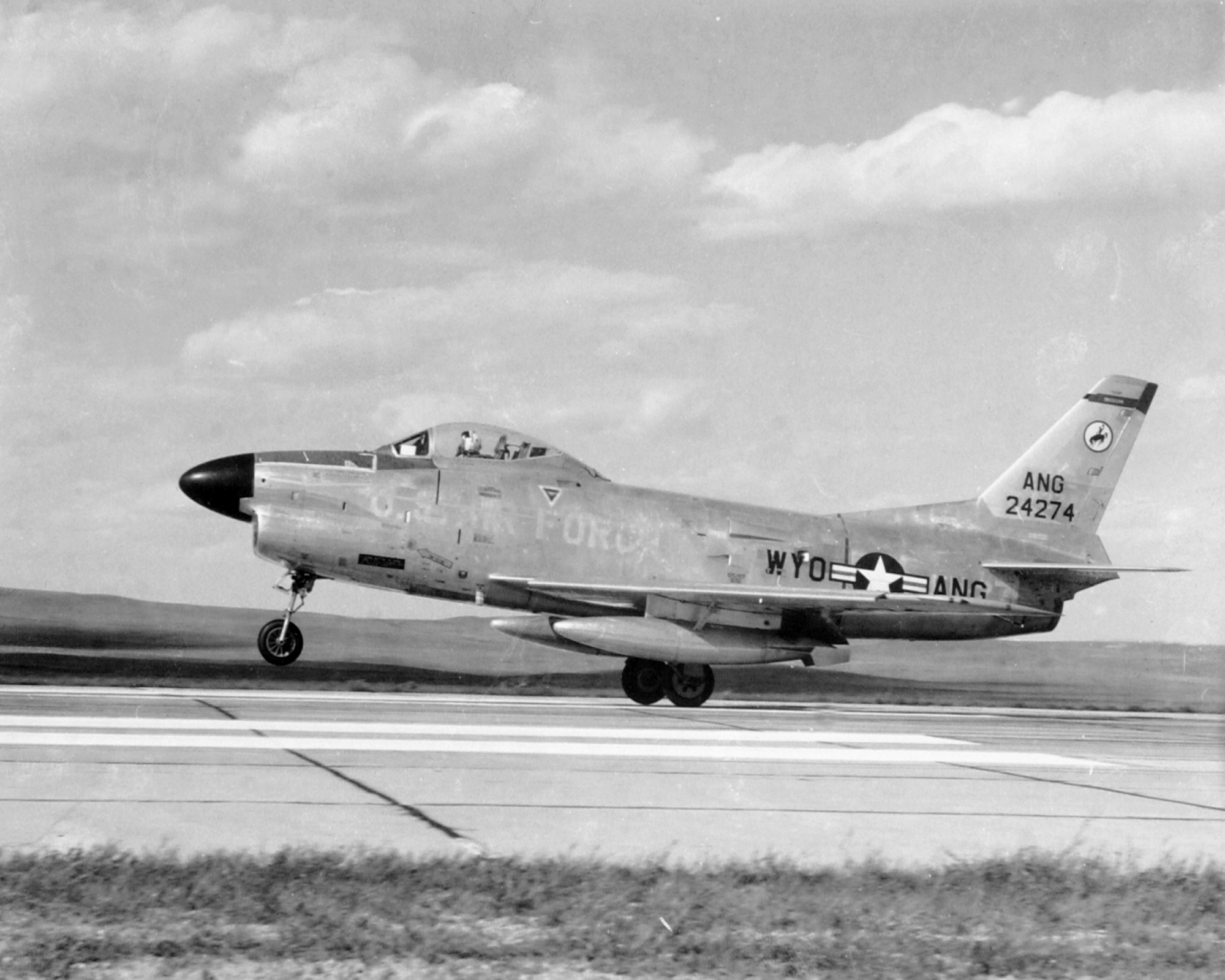
A Wyoming Air National Guard F-86L in the late 1950s.

On 18 November 1952, F-86D 51-2945 set a speed record of 698.505 mph (1,124.1 km/h). Captain J. Slade Nash flew over a three km (1.8 mi.) course at the Salton Sea in southern California at a height of only 125 ft (38 m). Another F-86D broke this world record on 16 July 1953, when Lieutenant Colonel William F. Barns, flying F-86D 51-6145 in the same path of the previous flight, achieved 715.697 mph (1,151.8 km/h).

== Variants ==
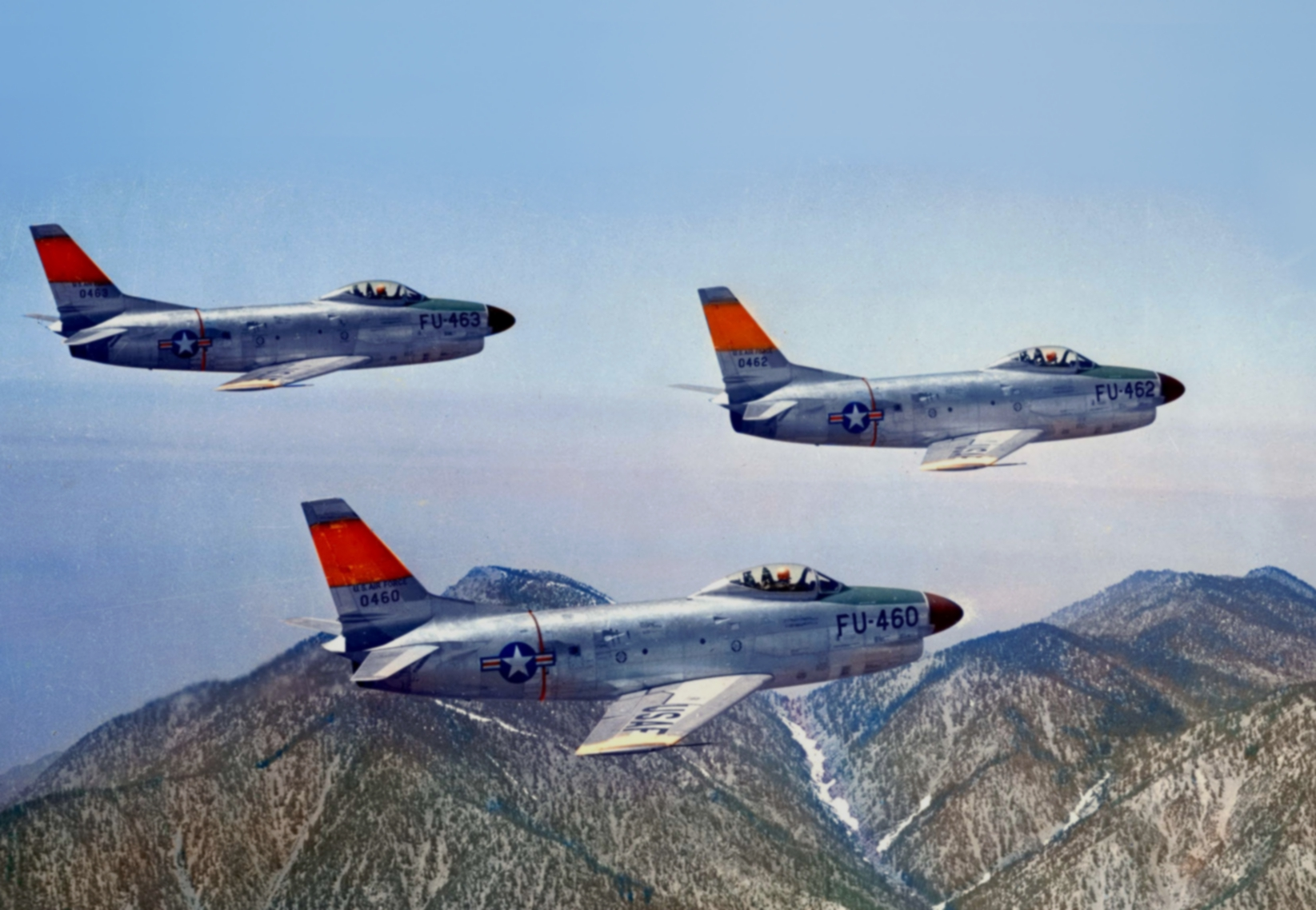
The fifth F-86D for the USAF in formation with two other early production aircraft

YF-95A
prototype all-weather interceptor; two built; designation changed to YF-86D (North American model NA-164)
YF-86D
originally designated YF-95A.
F-86D
Production interceptor originally designated F-95A, 2,504 built.
F-86G
Provisional designation for F-86D variant with uprated engine and equipment changes, 406 built as F-86Ds.
YF-86K
Basic version of F-86D intended for export with rocket tray replaced by four 20 mm cannon and simplified fire control system, two conversions.
F-86K
NATO version of F-86D; MG-4 fire control system; four 20 mm M24A1 cannon with 132 rounds per gun; APG-37 radar. 120 were built by North American, 221 were assembled by Fiat.
F-86L
Upgrade conversion of F-86D with new electronics, extended wingtips and wing leading edges, revised cockpit layout, and uprated engine; 981 converted.
B.Kh.17A
(Thai: บ.ข.๑๗ก) Royal Thai Air Force designation for the F-86L.

== Operators ==
Source: Dorr

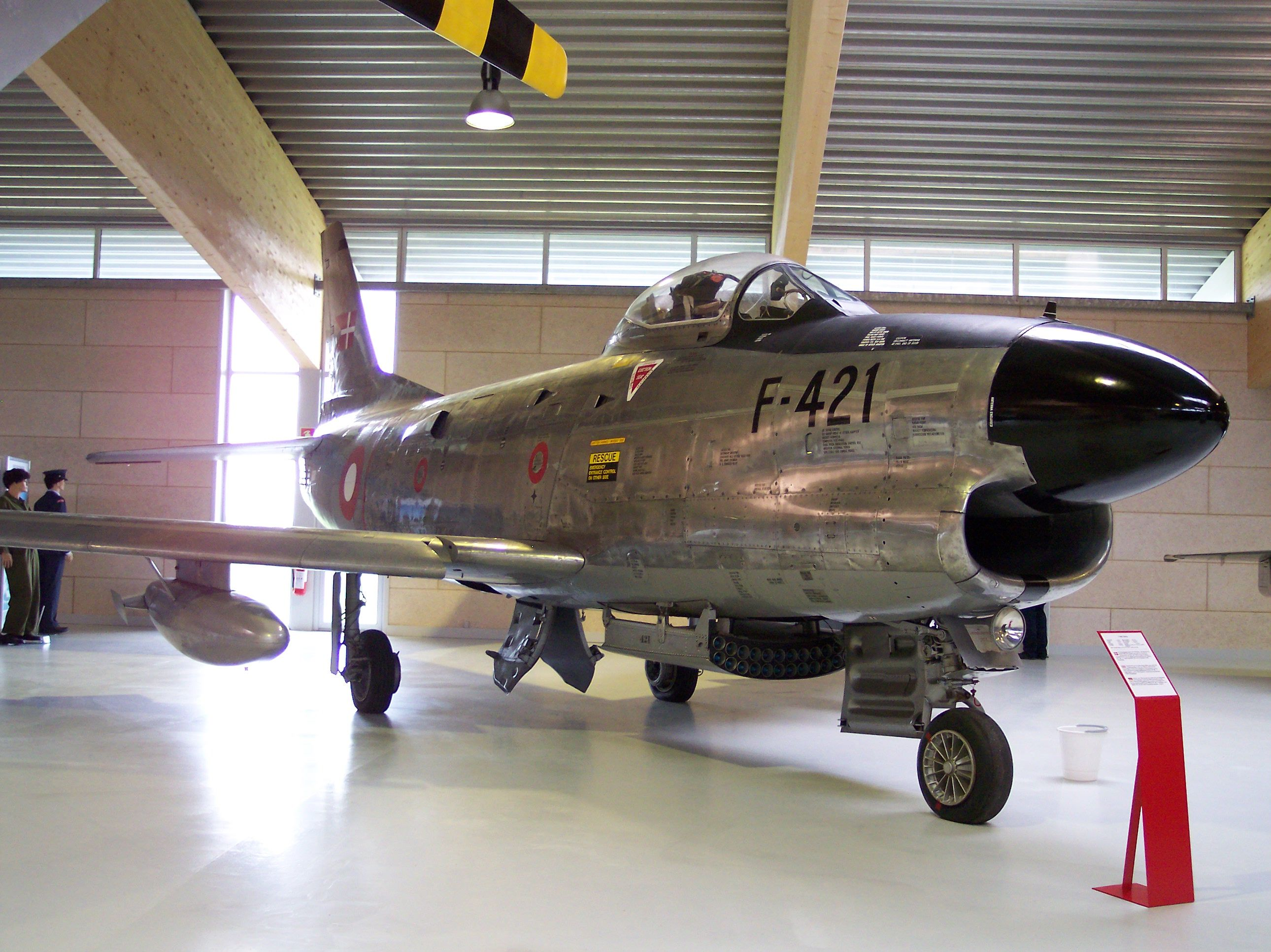
Danish North American F-86D Sabre

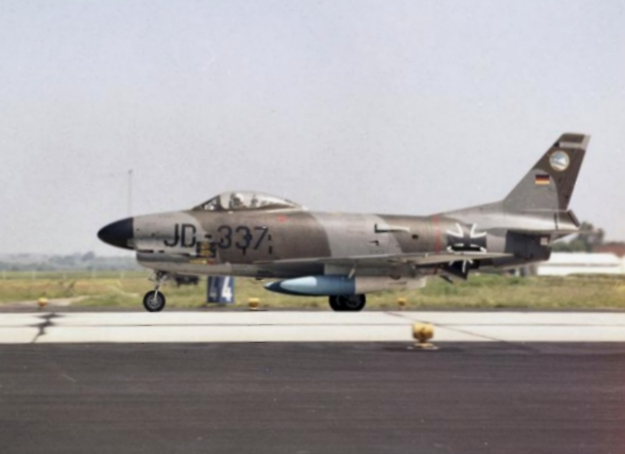
A West German Air Force F-86K in 1965.

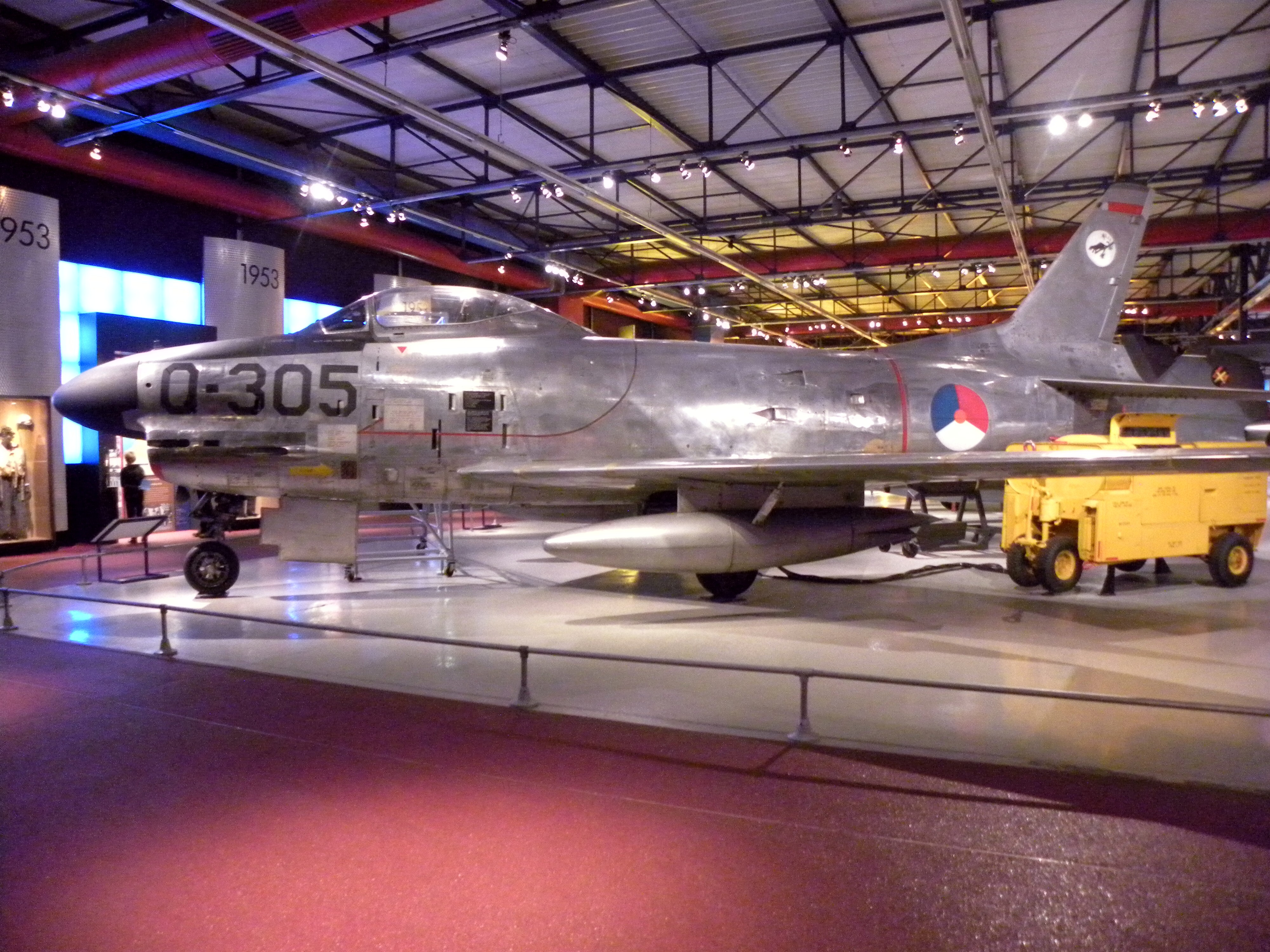
North American F-86K Royal Netherlands Air Force

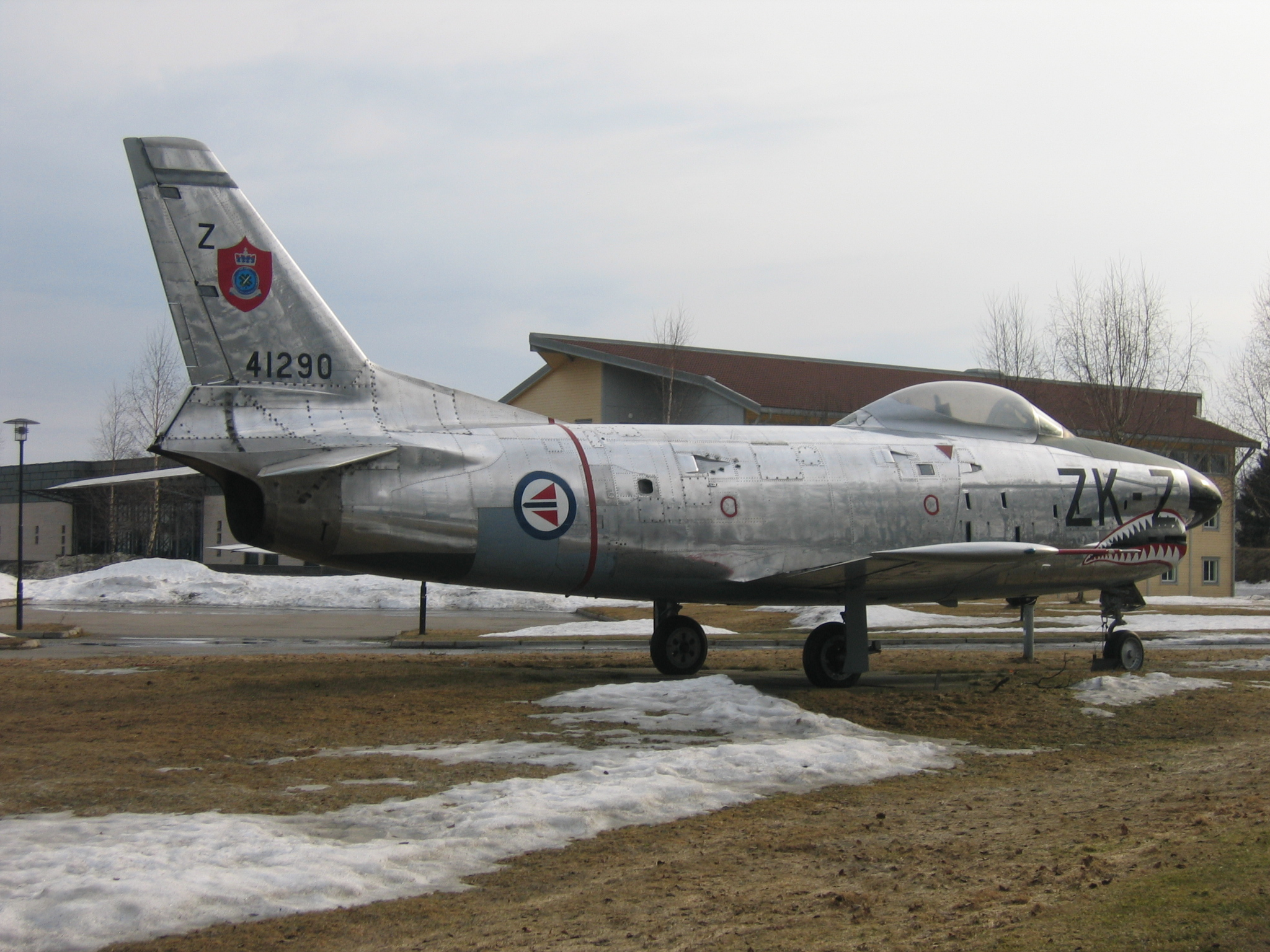
North American F-86K from Royal Norwegian Air Force.

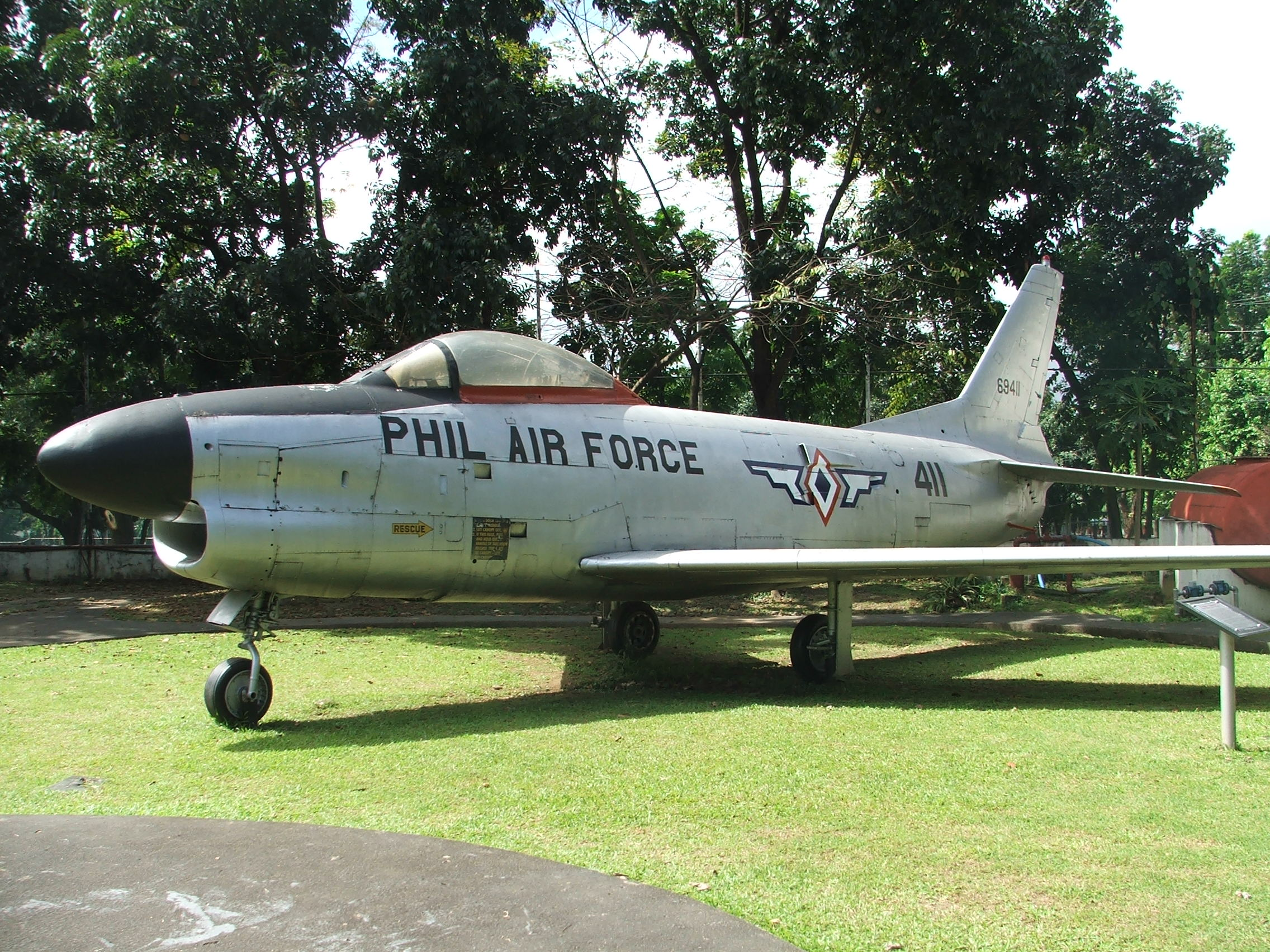
F-86D of the Philippine Air Force.

Denmark

- Royal Danish Air Force

Received 59 ex-USAF F-86Ds 1958-1960; assigned to 723, 726 and 728 Squadrons.
France

- French Air Force

Fiat built 62 F-86Ks for France (1956-1957), assigned to EC 1/13 "Artois", EC 2/13 "Alpes", and EC 3/13 "Auvergne" Squadrons. Serials were 55-4814/4844, 55-4846/4865, 55-4872/4874, 55-4876/4879.
West Germany

- German Air Force

Acquired 88 U.S. F-86Ks 22 July 1957–23 June 1958. The Ks were assigned to Jagdgeschwader 75/renamed 74.
Greece

- Greek Air Force

Acquired 35 F-86Ds from the US. Were received in 1961 and retired in 1967 but kept as back up until 1969. F-86D was the first all weather fighter in Greek Air Force. F-86Ds were assigned to 337 and 343 Squadrons. Until 1964 they were in natural metal. Until after retirement they were in NATO camo.
Honduras

- Honduran Air Force

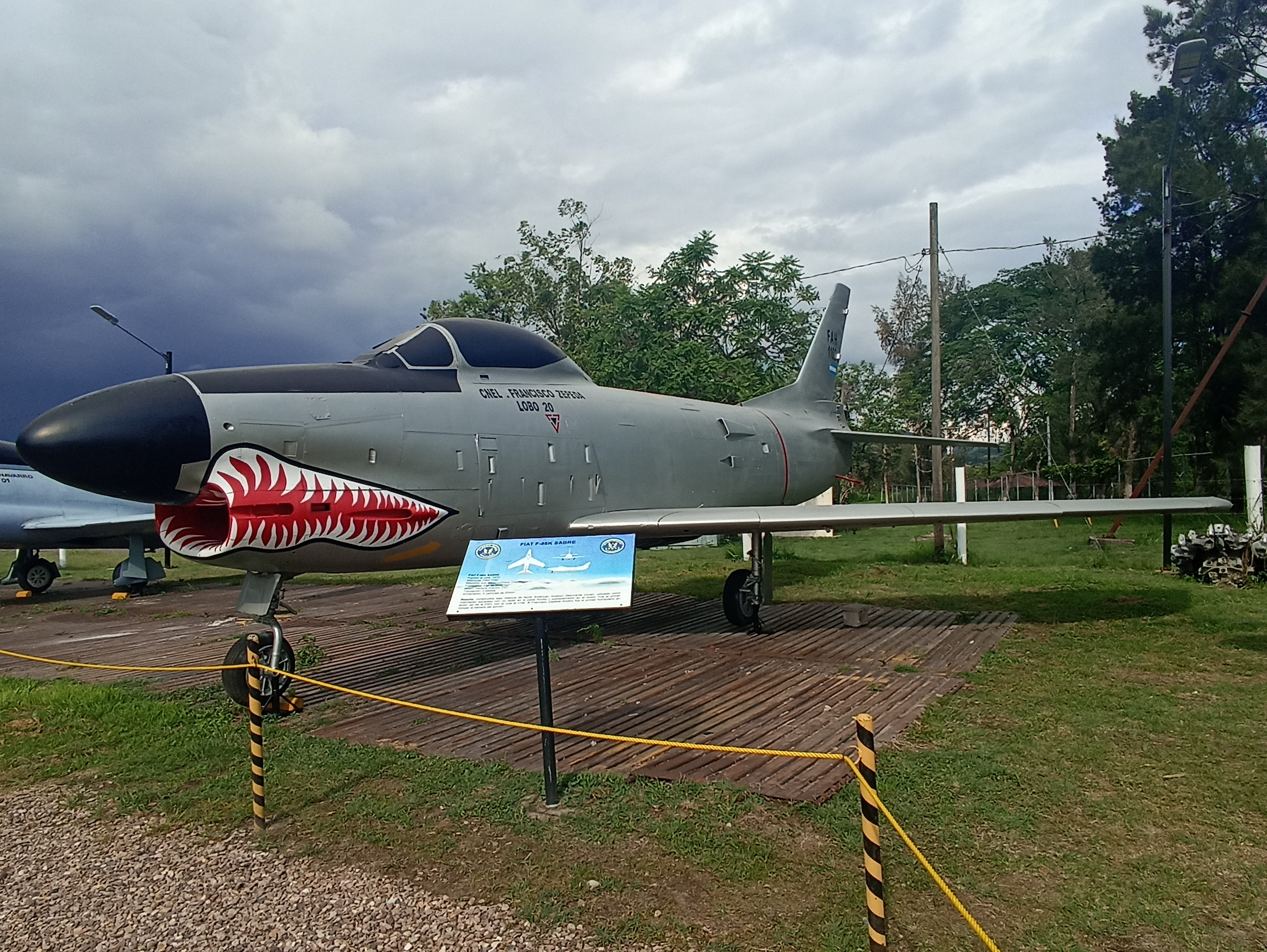
A former Honduran F-86K in Honduran Aviation Museum in Tegucigalpa, Honduras

Acquired Six Venezuelan F-86Ks in 1970.
Italy

- Italian Air Force

Fiat produced 121 F-86Ks for Italy, 1955-1958. Also, 120 U.S. F-86Ks were acquired. F-86s were assigned to the AMI air groups: 6 Gruppo COT/1 Stormo, 17 Gruppo/1 Stormo, 23 Gruppo/1 Stormo, 21 Gruppo/51 Aerobrigata, 22 Gruppo/51 Aerobrigata and 12 Gruppo/4 Aerobrigata.
Japan

- Japanese Air Self-Defense Force

Acquired 122 US F-86Ds, 1958–1961; assigned to four all-weather interceptor Hikōtai, and Air Proving Ground at Gifu.
Netherlands

- Royal Netherlands Air Force (Koninklijke Luchtmacht) (KLu)

Acquired 57 U.S.-built and six Fiat-built F-86K Sabres, 1955–1956; and assigned to three squadrons, No. 700, 701 and 702. Operated until 1964.
Norway

- Royal Norwegian Air Force

Acquired 60 U.S.-built F-86K Sabres, 1955–1956, and four Italian-assembled Fiat K-models.
Philippines

- Philippine Air Force

Acquired 20 F-86Ds, assigned to 8th Fighter Interceptor Squadron "Vampires" beginning 1960; part of the U.S. military assistance package.
South Korea

- Republic of Korea Air Force

Acquired 40 F-86Ds, beginning 20 June 1955.
Republic of China (Taiwan)

- Republic of China Air Force

Thailand

- Royal Thai Air Force

Acquired 20 F-86Ls.
United States

- United States Air Force

Venezuela

- Venezuelan Air Force

Acquired 79 Fiat-built F-86Ks from West Germany in 1965, they lasted few years in service due to many maintenance issues.
Yugoslavia

- SFR Yugoslav Air Force

Acquired 130 U.S.-made F-86Ds and operated them between 1961 and 1974. 32 of these were modified into a reconnaissance variant utilizing 3 Kodak K-24 cameras mounted in place of the FFAR rockets, the IF-86D.

== Surviving aircraft ==
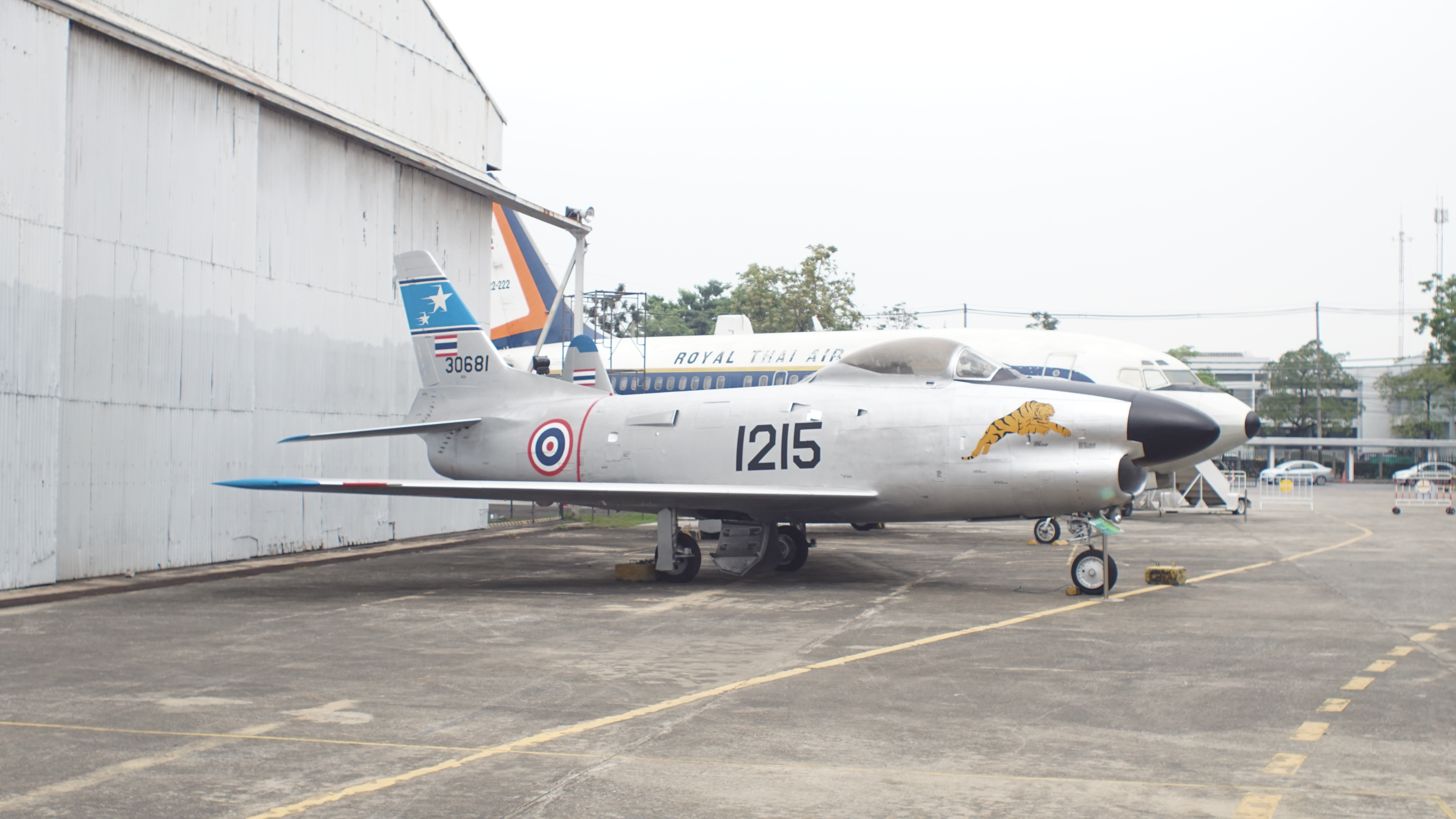
A F-86L of the RTAF on display at the Royal Thai Air Force Museum

== Specifications (F-86D-40-NA) ==
North American F-86K Sabre.

Data from Combat Aircraft since 1945, The American Fighter

General characteristics

- Crew: one
- Length: 40 ft 3 in (12.27 m)
- Wingspan: 37 ft 1.5 in (11.31 m)
- Height: 15 ft 0 in (4.57 m)
- Empty weight: 13,518 lb (6,132 kg)
- Gross weight: 19,975 lb (9,060 kg)
- Powerplant: 1 × General Electric J47-GE-17B , 5,425 lbf (24.13 kN) thrust dry, 7,500 lbf (33 kN) with afterburner

Performance

- Maximum speed: 715 mph (1,151 km/h, 621 kn)
- Maximum speed: Mach .93
- Range: 330 mi (531 km, 290 nmi)
- Service ceiling: 49,750 ft (15,163 m)
- Rate of climb: 12,150 ft/min (61.7 m/s)

Armament

- 24 × 2.75 in (70 mm) Mighty Mouse FFAR rockets in ventral tray

Avionics

- AN/APG-36 all-weather radar

== See also ==
- Aerospace Defense Command
- North American Aerospace Defense Command
- Semi-Automatic Ground Environment

Related development

- CAC Sabre
- Canadair Sabre
- North American F-86 Sabre
- North American F-100 Super Sabre
- North American FJ-1 Fury
- North American FJ-2/-3 Fury
- North American FJ-4 Fury
- North American YF-93

Aircraft of comparable role, configuration, and era

- Douglas F3D Skyknight
- Douglas F4D Skyray
- Fiat G.91
- Lockheed F-94 Starfire
- Mikoyan-Gurevich MiG-17
- Northrop F-89 Scorpion
- Saab 29 Tunnan
- Supermarine Swift

Related lists

- List of fighter aircraft
- List of military aircraft of the United States
