= 59th Test and Evaluation Squadron =

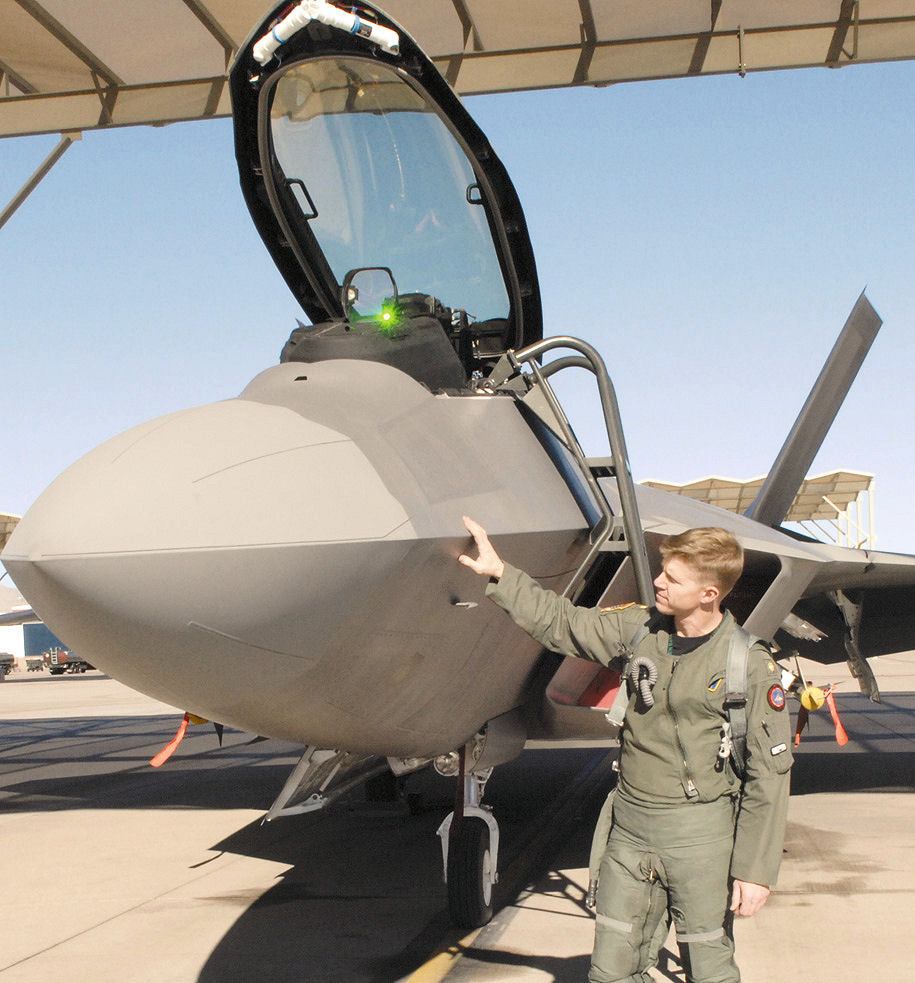
- A 59th Test and Evaluation Squadron F-22 pilot, conducts a pre-flight inspection
- Country: United States
- Branch: United States Air Force
- Type: Squadron
- Role: Test and Evaluation
- Part of: 53d Test Management Group
- Garrison/HQ: Nellis Air Force Base, Nevada
- Nickname: Golden Pride
- Motto: Fraicudan Du (Scottish Gaelic Black Watch)
- Engagements: Mediterranean Theater of Operations; China Burma India Theater; Operation Southern Watch
- Decorations: Distinguished Unit Citation; Air Force Outstanding Unit Award

Insignia
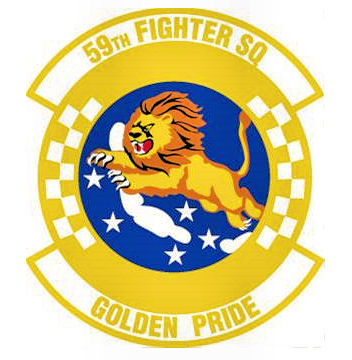
- 59th Test and Evaluation Squadron emblem (approved 6 August 1986)

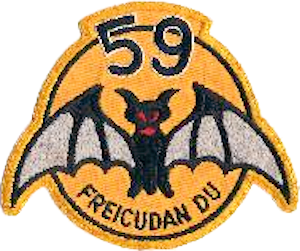
- Unofficial 59th Fighter-Interceptor Squadron emblem

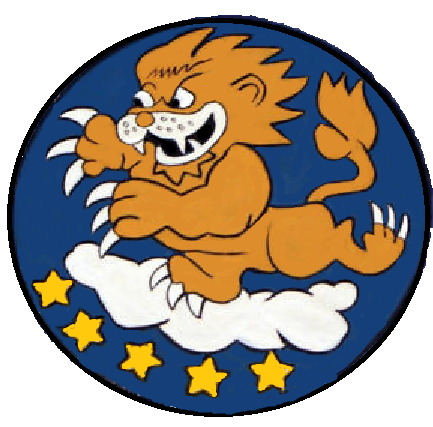
- 59th Fighter Squadron emblem (approved 24 July 1944)

The 59th Test and Evaluation Squadron is a United States Air Force unit. It is assigned to the Air Combat Command 53d Wing, 53d Test Management Group at Nellis Air Force Base, Nevada.

The 59th Test and Evaluation Squadron is responsible for the management of A-10, F-15C/E, F-16, F-22, F-35, HH-60, HC-130J and Guardian Angel weapon system testing including force development evaluations, tactics development and evaluations, and software evaluations. Squadron personnel direct operational test planning and execution, as well as data gathering, analyzing, and reporting for the above systems operated by the combat air forces. The squadron also manages Operational Test and Evaluation of weapons and support systems in order to improve current and future U.S. Air Force combat capabilities.

== History ==
=== World War II ===
The squadron was constituted as the 59th Pursuit Squadron (Interceptor) on 20 November 1940 and activated on 15 January 1941 at Mitchel Field, New York as part of the 33d Pursuit Group. The squadron trained on the Bell P-39 Airacobra but soon switched to the more modern Curtiss P-40 Warhawk. After the Japanese Attack on Pearl Harbor on 7 December resulted in the American entry into World War II, the squadron was moved to various bases to provide air defense for the East Coast, relocating to Groton Airport in Connecticut on 7 December, Glenn Martin Airport in Maryland on 15 December, and finally to Philadelphia Airport on 10 May 1942. Five days after moving to Philadelphia, the squadron was redesignated the 59th Fighter Squadron when all Air Force pursuit units became fighter units, and between May and June it was temporarily stationed at Paine Field in Washington to provide air defense on the West Coast.

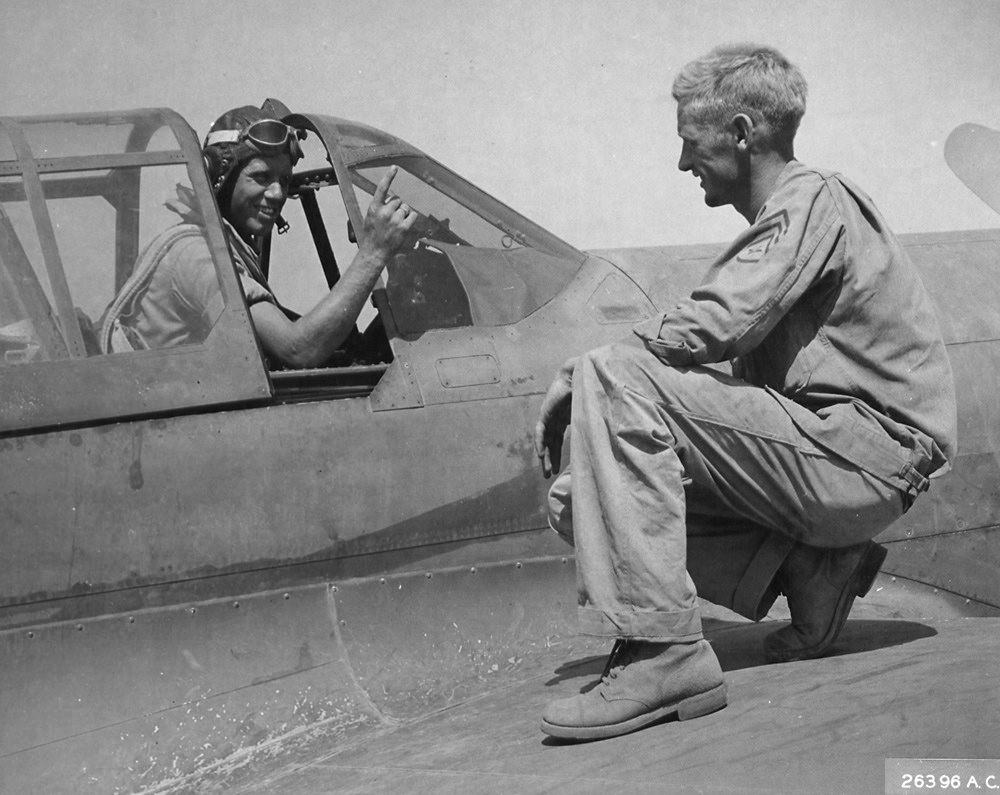
A P-40 pilot of the squadron holds up a finger to tell his crew chief that he has downed a German plane, Paestum airfield, 15 September 1943

On 12 October, the squadron and the 33rd Fighter Group left Philadelphia for loading aboard the escort carrier USS Chenango for Operation Torch, the Anglo-American invasion of North Africa, which began on 8 November. Two days later, the squadron flew into the French Port Lyautey Airfield, relocating to Casablanca Airfield on 17 November. It operated with Twelfth Air Force in the Mediterranean Theater of Operations until February 1944, providing close air support for ground forces, and bombing and strafing personnel concentrations, port installations, fuel dumps, bridges, highways, and rail lines. Took part in the reduction of Pantelleria and flew patrol missions while Allied troops landed after surrender of the enemy's garrison. It also participated in the invasion and conquest of Sicily by supporting landings at Salerno, southern Italy, and the beachhead at Anzio.

After moving to India in February 1944, the unit trained with Lockheed P-38 Lightnings and Republic P-47 Thunderbolts. It then moved to China where it continued training and flew patrol and intercept missions. Upon returning to India in September 1944, it flew dive bombing and strafing missions in Burma until the Allied campaigns in that area had been completed.

From August 1946, the 33d Group served as part of the US occupation force in Germany, being stationed at USAFE airfields at Neubiberg and Bad Kissingen, operating P-47 Thunderbolts.

=== Strategic Fighter Escort Squadron ===
Returned to United States in August 1947, being assigned to Strategic Air Command (SAC). Assigned administratively to Andrews Field, Maryland, then being organized at Roswell Army Air Field, New Mexico on 16 August 1947 as part of Eighth Air Force. Equipped with North American P-51D Mustangs. In June 1948, transitioned to the first-generation Republic F-84C Thunderjet.

=== Air Defense Command ===
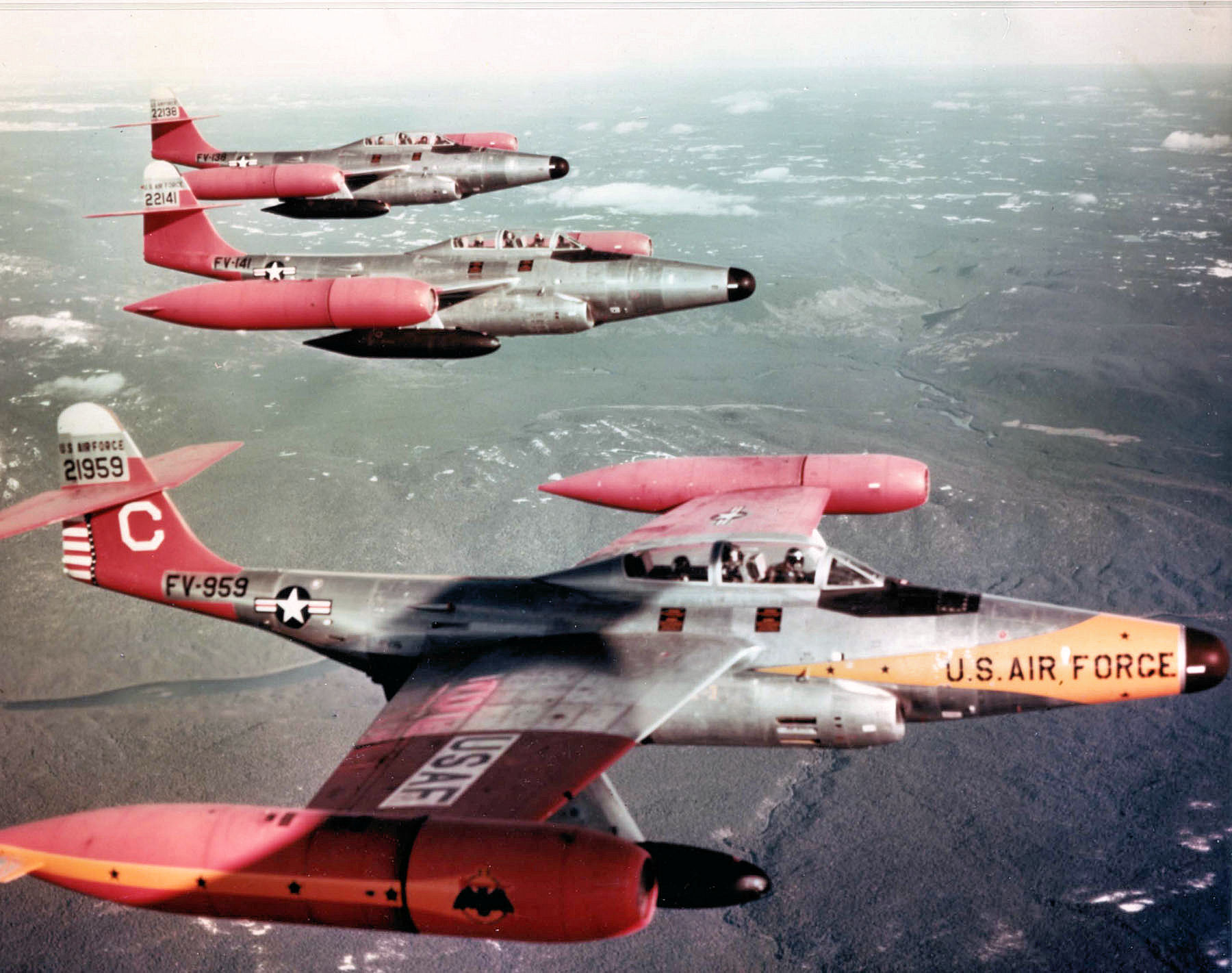
F-89s of the 59th Fighter-Interceptor Squadron at Goose Bay in the 1950s

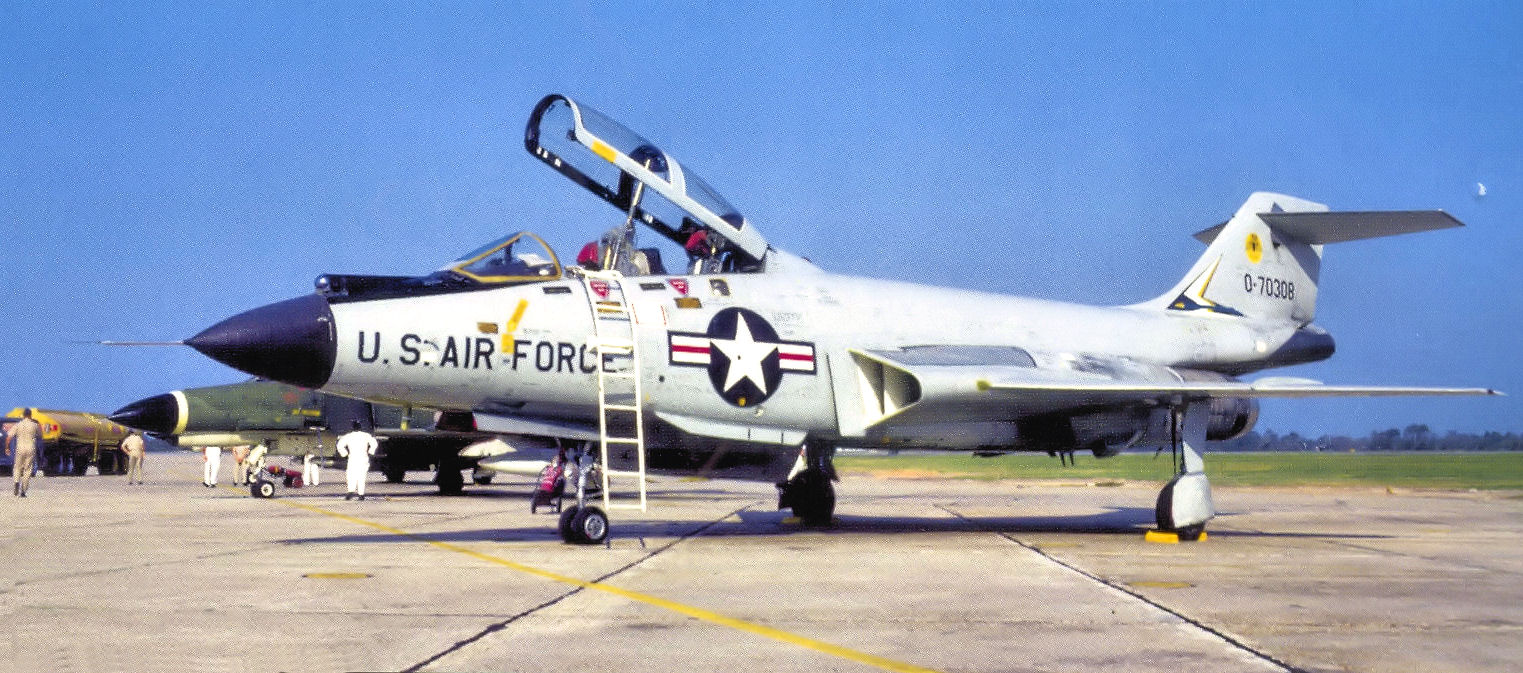
59th Fighter-Interceptor Squadron McDonnell F-101B-90-MC Voodoo 57-308 Kingsley Field, Oregon May 1969

Reassigned to the Air Defense Command (ADC) First Air Force on 1 December 1948. With the new ADC assignment, moved to Otis Air Force Base, Massachusetts on 16 November 1948 as part of the 26th Air Division. In February 1949, transitioned to North American F-86A Sabre day interceptor with the F-84s being sent to Republic Aircraft for refurbishment and reassignment to Air National Guard units.

The squadron moved to Goose Air Base, Labrador under Northeast Air Command (NEAC) on 28 October 1952, assigned to NEAC's 64th Air Division, headquartered at Pepperrell Air Force Base. The 59th first operated the Lockheed F-94B Starfire all-weather night fighter interceptors with a detachment at Thule Air Base, subsequently the Northrop F-89 Scorpion jet interceptors from the airfield, assisting in the air defense of the region. When SAC received jurisdiction of the United States facilities at Goose in 1957 with the inactivation of NEAC, ADC took over the USAF atmospheric defense forces (including the 64th Air Division). The 59th was upgraded to the Convair F-102A Delta Dagger supersonic interceptor in 1960. It continued defensive patrols over the region.

Moved to Bergstrom Air Force Base, Texas in 1967 and was upgraded to the McDonnell F-101B Voodoo and the F-101F operational and conversion trainer. The two-seat trainer version was equipped with dual controls, but carried the same armament as the F-101B and were fully combat-capable. Moved to Kingsley Field, Oregon in 1968 then inactivated on 31 December 1969 as part of the drawdown of ADC interceptor bases, the aircraft being passed along to the Air National Guard.

=== Tactical Air Command ===
Reactivated at Eglin Air Force Base, Florida in 1970 and equipped with McDonnell F-4 Phantom IIs. Supported the Tactical Air Warfare Center in weapon systems evaluation program tests from January–December 1973, and periodically thereafter until July 1978. Aircrews ferried F-4Es to Israel in October 1973. The 59th augmented intercept defense forces of North American Air Defense Command (NORAD) beginning 1 January 1976 – 15 January 1979 and 4 January 1982 – 5 April 1982. In 1979, "The Golden Pride" traded in their last F-4s for the McDonnell Douglas F-15 Eagle. Later, they provided personnel and equipment to fly combat air patrols and air intercept missions for contingency operations in Grenada from October–November 1983, and Panama December 1989 – January 1990. (I won't change the written information, but the 59th Tactical Fighter Squadron supported NORAD operations and pulled alert at Eglin (I was first in the 58th TFS and then for about 6 months in the 59th TFS.) I left the 59th TFS in February 1979.

=== Desert Storm ===
The 59th did deploy during Operations Desert Shield Desert Storm at King Abdulaziz Air Base. Some of their personnel deployed with the 58th Tactical Fighter Squadron from 26 August 1990 – 12 April 1991, to help support manning, and to provide some experience. The 59th deployed as a relief rotation for their sister squadron (58 FS). One of the 59th's members who deployed to the Gulf was the late Captain Rhory "Hoser" Draeger, who, on 26 January 1991, shot down a MiG-23, while flying an F-15C. Personnel and aircraft continued rotations to Saudi Arabia to protect coalition assets and to ensure that Iraq complied with treaty terms. Continued deployments to Saudi Arabia, Canada, the Caribbean, South America, Jamaica, Iceland, Italy, and Puerto Rico and participated in various operations until inactivated in 1999.

=== Operational Test & Evaluation ===
Reactivated at Nellis Air Force Base in 2004 assuming current mission.

== Lineage ==
- Constituted as the 59th Pursuit Squadron (Interceptor) on 20 November 1940

Activated on 15 January 1941
Redesignated 59th Fighter Squadron on 15 May 1942
Redesignated 59th Fighter Squadron, Two Engine on 8 February 1945
Inactivated on 8 December 1945

- Redesignated 59th Fighter Squadron, Single Engine on 17 July 1946

Activated on 20 August 1946
Redesignated 59th Fighter Squadron, Jet on 14 June 1948
Redesignated 59th Fighter-Interceptor Squadron on 20 January 1950
Discontinued and inactivated on 2 January 1967

- Activated on 30 September 1968

Inactivated on 17 December 1969

- Redesignated 59th Tactical Fighter Squadron on 16 March 1970

Activated on 1 September 1970
Redesignated 59th Fighter Squadron on 1 November 1991
Inactivated on 15 April 1999

- Redesignated 59th Test and Evaluation Squadron on 28 October 2004

Activated on 3 December 2004

=== Assignments ===
- 33d Pursuit Group (later 33d Fighter Group), 15 January 1941 – 8 December 1945
- 33d Fighter Group (later 33d Fighter-Interceptor Group), 20 August 1946
- 4707th Defense Wing (later 4707th Air Defense Wing), 6 February 1952 (attached to Northeast Air Command 28 October 1952, 64th Air Division after 1 November 1952)
- 64th Air Division, 1 February 1953
- 4732d Air Defense Group, 1 April 1957
- Goose Air Defense Sector, 1 April 1960
- 37th Air Division, 1 April 1966 – 2 January 1967
- 408th Fighter Group, 30 September 1968 – 17 December 1969
- 33d Tactical Fighter Wing (later 33d Fighter Wing), 1 September 1970
- 33d Operations Group, 1 December 1991 – 15 April 1999
- 53d Test Management Group, 3 December 2004 – present

=== Stations ===
- Mitchel Field, New York, 15 January 1941 (operated from Groton Army Air Field, Connecticut after 7 December 1941)
- Glenn Martin Airport, Maryland, 15 December 1941
- Philadelphia Airport, Pennsylvania, 10 May–12 October 1942

Operated from Paine Field, Washington, May–June 1942

- Port Lyautey Airfield, French Morocco, 10 November 1942
- Casablanca Airfield, French Morocco, 17 November 1942
- Thelepte Airfield, Tunisia, c. 8 January 1943
- Youks-les-Bains Airfield, Algeria, 10 February 1943
- Telergma Airfield, Algeria, 13 February 1943
- Berteaux Airfield, Algeria, 2 March 1943

Operated from Thelepte Airfield, Tunisia, 20 March–12 April 1943

- Ebba Ksour Airfield, Tunisia, 12 April 1943
- Menzel Temime Airfield, Tunisia, 20 May 1943
- Sousse Airfield, Tunisia, 9 June 1943
- Pantelleria Airfield, Sicily, 18 June 1943
- Licata Airfield, Sicily, 16 July 1943
- Paestum Airfield, Italy, 13 September 1943
- Santa Maria Airfield, Italy, 18 November 1943

Operated from Paestum Airfield, Italy, 1–31 December 1943

- Cercola Airfield, Italy, c. 1 January–c. 5 February 1944
- Karachi Airport, India, 12 February 1944
- Fungwansham Airfield, China, 19 March 1944
- Moran Airfield, India, 5 September 1944
- Nagaghuli Airfield, India, 21 November 1944
- Piardoba Airfield, India, 2 May 1945
- Dudhkundi Airfield, India, 15 May–15 November 1945
- Camp Shanks, New York, 7–8 December 1945
- AAF Station Neubiberg, Germany, 20 August 1946
- AAF Station Bad Kissingen, Germany, July–25 August 1947
- Andrews Field, Maryland, 25 August 1947
- Roswell Army Air Field (later Walker Air Force Base), New Mexico, 16 September 1947
- Otis Air Force Base, Massachusetts, 16 November 1948
- Goose Air Base, Labrador, 28 October 1952
- Bergstrom Air Force Base, Texas, 1–2 January 1967
- Kingsley Field, Oregon, 30 September 1968 – 17 December 1969
- Eglin Air Force Base, Florida, 1 September 1970 – 15 April 1999
- Nellis Air Force Base, Nevada, 3 December 2004 – present

=== Aircraft ===
- Bell P-39 Airacobra, 1941
- Curtiss P-40 Warhawk, 1941–1944
- Republic P-47 Thunderbolt, 1944–1945
- Lockheed P-38 Lightning, 1944–1945
- North American P-51 (later F-51) Mustang, 1946–1949
- Republic F-84 Thunderstreak, 1948–1950
- North American F-86 Sabre, 1950–1952
- Lockheed F-94B Starfire, 1952–1956
- Northrop F-89D Scorpion, 1955–1960
- Convair F-102 Delta Dagger, 1960–1966
- McDonnell F-101 Voodoo, 1968–1969
- McDonnell F-4 Phantom II, 1973–1979
- McDonnell Douglas F-15 Eagle, 1979–1996, 1996–1999
