= 60th Fighter Squadron =

60th Fighter Squadron

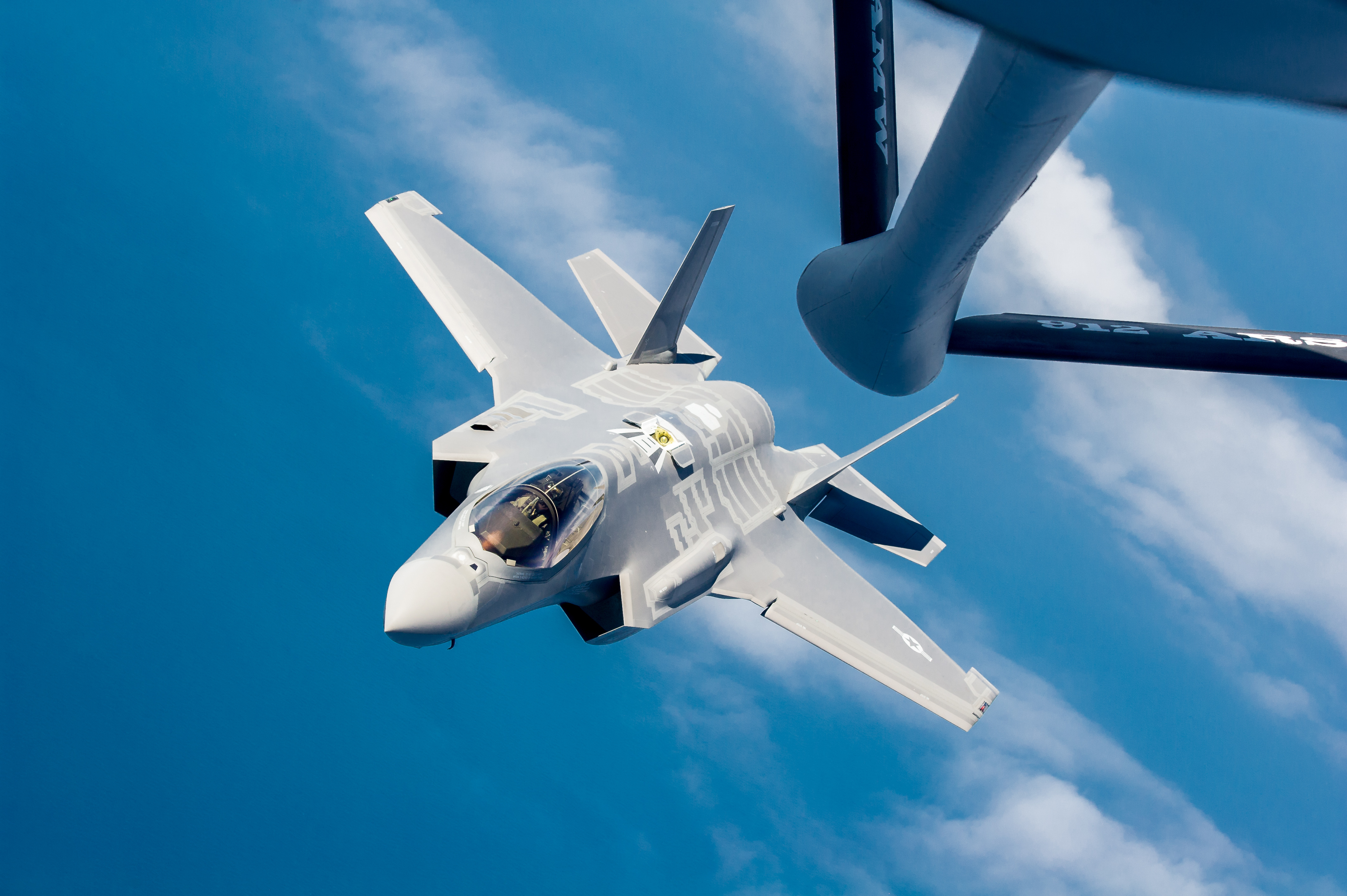
- An F-35A Lightning II of the 33rd Fighter Wing maneuvers into position to refuel with a KC-135 Stratotanker
- Active: 1941–1945; 1946–1971; 1971–2009; 2021-present
- Country: United States
- Branch: United States Air Force
- Role: Fighter
- Size: squadron
- Part of: Air Combat Command
- Nickname: Fighting Crows
- Engagements: EAME Theater World War II; Asia-Pacific Theater World War II

- Decorations: Distinguished Unit Citation; Air Force Outstanding Unit Award

Commanders
- Notable commanders: Daniel James, Jr.

Insignia
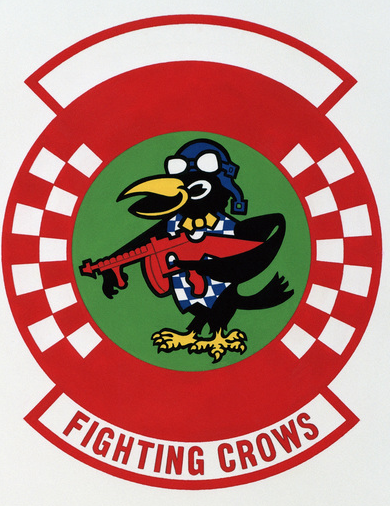
- 60th Fighter Squadron emblem (Note: Approved c. September 1986. A revised emblem is pending. Musser.)

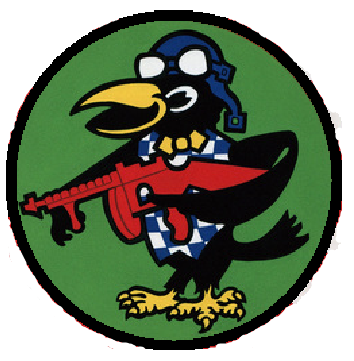
- 60th Fighter Squadron emblem (Note: Approved 15 March 1942.)

The 60th Fighter Squadron is a United States Air Force unit that is part of the 33d Fighter Wing at Eglin Air Force Base, Florida; It is tasked with training pilots on the Lockheed Martin F-35A Lightning II.

== History ==
=== World War II ===
Activated in 1940 at Mitchel Field, New York as the 60th Pursuit Squadron, the unit was assigned to the 33d Pursuit Group on 15 January 1941. Redesignated as the 60th Fighter Squadron "Fighting Crows" on 15 May 1942, the unit was responsible for the continual mission of air defense of the United States until October 1942. In late 1942, the 60th joined the United States' effort in World War II by participating in combat operations in the Mediterranean Theater and the China-Burma-India Theater. As a result of superior performance in central Tunisia, the 60th earned the Distinguished Unit Citation for combat operations on 15 January 1944. Following its service in World War II, the 60th was assigned to the 33d Fighter Group at Neubiberg Air Base, Germany in August 1946 and flew the North American P-51 Mustang.

=== Air Defense Command ===
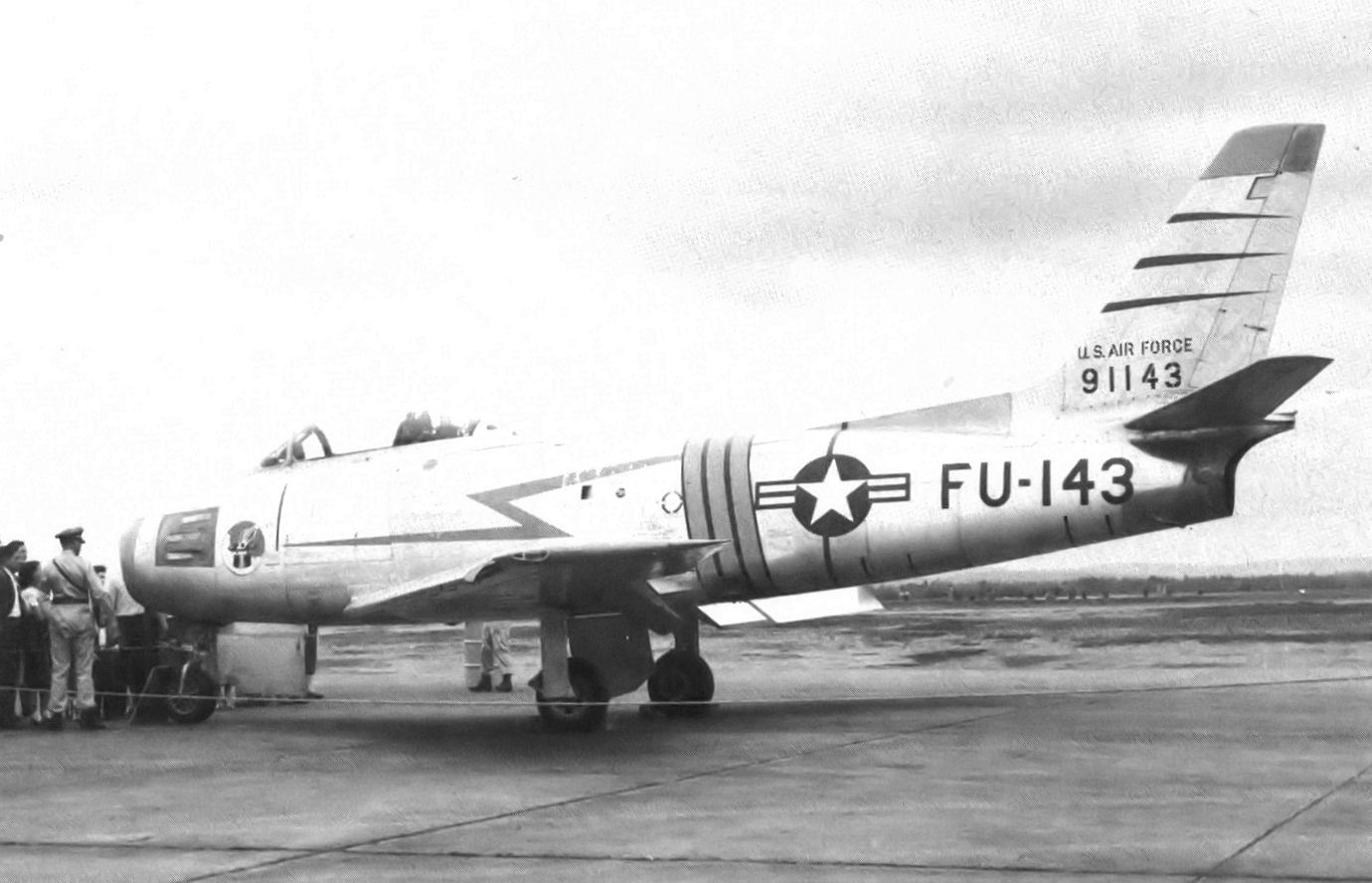
F-86A Sabre at Westover AFB, c.1951 (Note: Aircraft is North American F-86A-5-NA Sabre, serial 49-1143.)

In 1947, the 60th transferred to Roswell Army Air Field, New Mexico and soon afterward, in June 1948, converted to the Republic F-84 Thunderjet. In November 1948, the 60th transferred to Otis Air Force Base, Massachusetts and by June of the following year had completed a conversion to the new North American F-86 Sabre. On 9 August 1950, the 60th moved to Westover Air Force Base, Massachusetts and on 1 January 1951 became part of the Air Defense Command. From 1952 to 1959, the 60th, flying the F-86 Sabre and the Lockheed F-94 Starfire, was assigned to various organizations including the 4707th Defense Wing, 4735th Air Defense Group and the Boston Air Defense Sector.

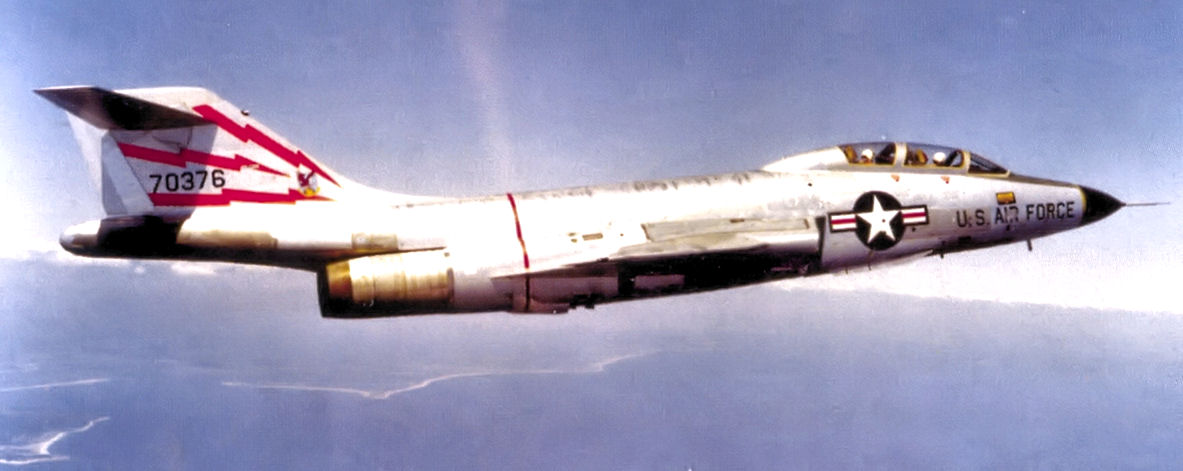
60th Squadron McDonnell F-101B (Note: Aircraft is McDonnell F-101B-MC VooDoo, serial 57-376, circa 1960.)

On 5 January 1959, the 60th was the first Air Defense Command squadron to receive the new McDonnell F-101B Voodoo interceptor. The unit was additionally tasked as part of the joint test force (teamed with members at Eglin Air Force Base, Florida) to test the F-101's operational capabilities prior to its entrance into active service. The F-101B proved to be a quite successful interceptor. assigned alongside the F-101B interceptor was the F-101F operational and conversion trainer. The two-seat trainer version was equipped with dual controls, but carried the same armament as the F-101B and were fully combat-capable.

During the 1960s, the 60th participated in various tests, exercises, and operations in the Air Defense Command. In October and November 1962, the unit was placed on alert during the Cuban Missile Crisis, and several planes with weapons and support crews were deployed to support potential combat needs. Planes remaining at Otis continued to perform the Air Defense Command continental air defense mission. Although it has been stated that F-101B Voodoos from the 60th were used in the production of the 1966 comedy The Russians Are Coming, the Russians Are Coming, the film, although set in New England, was actually shot on the West Coast for financial reasons and the fighters were from the 84th Fighter-Interceptor Squadron, based at Hamilton Air Force Base, California. The 60th inactivated on 30 April 1971.

=== Tactical Air Command ===
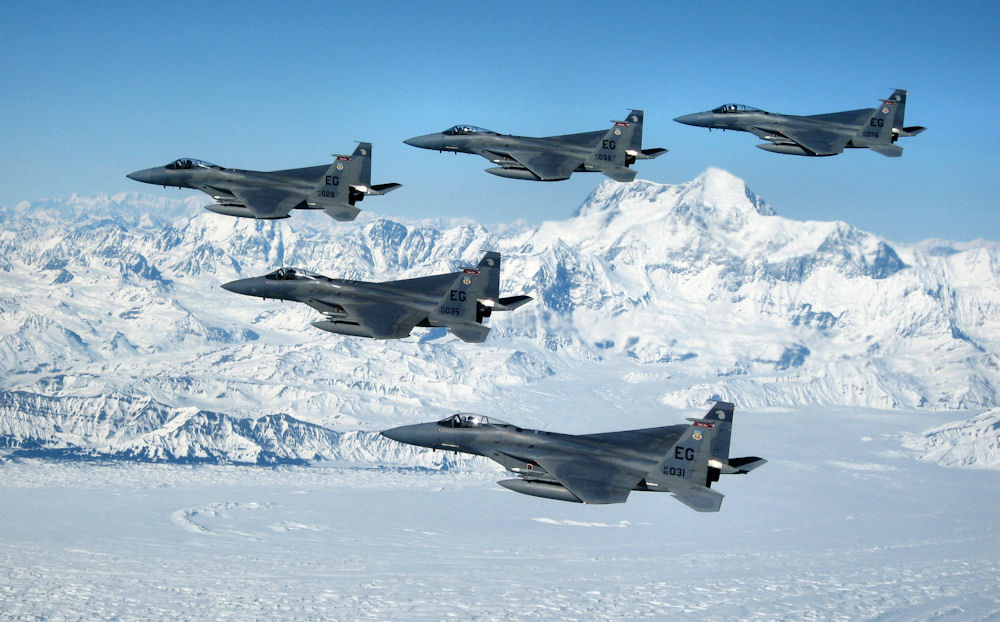
Five 60th Fighter Squadron F-15Cs soar over the Alaska mountains while participating in Red Flag Alaska 07-1

In September 1971, the squadron was reactivated at Eglin Air Force Base, Florida as the 60th Tactical Fighter Squadron of the 33d Tactical Fighter Wing, flying the McDonnell F-4E Phantom II until transitioning to the McDonnell Douglas F-15A Eagle in the late 1970s. In 1979, the unit participated in the "Kadena Ready Eagle" program in which the members of the 60th trained new F-15 pilots stationed at Kadena Air Base, Japan.

The 60th made its first combat deployment since World War II when it sent ten F-15s to Grenada in support of Operation Urgent Fury, the rescue of American medical students held in Grenada in the mid-1980s. The unit continued to train and until it was called upon to fly support missions for Operation Just Cause (the removal of Panamanian dictator Manuel Noriega from Panama in the early 1990s).

=== Air Combat Command ===
The 60th Fighter Squadron flew the F-15 Eagle and supported the various combatant commanders by providing air superiority on call. In September 1990, members, both airmen and pilots, of the 60th were deployed in support of Operation Desert Storm as augmentees to its sister squadron the 58th and 59th fighter squadrons. This led to the most aerial victories by any single unit since Viet Nam. The squadron also participated in Operation Noble Eagle following 9/11. It flew its last F-15 mission on 5 December 2008. The squadron was inactivated on 1 January 2009.

=== Air Education and Training Command ===
The squadron was reactivated on 20 August 2021 as the second formal training unit of the 33d Operations Group, 33d Fighter Wing. The 33d was assigned to the Nineteenth Air Force of AETC until being reassigned to the Fifteenth Air Force of Air Combat Command in July 2026.

== Lineage ==
- Constituted as the 60th Pursuit Squadron (Interceptor) on 20 November 1940

Activated on 15 January 1941
Redesignated 60th Fighter Squadron on 15 May 1942
Redesignated 60th Fighter Squadron, Two Engine on 8 February 1945
Inactivated on 8 December 1945

- Redesignated 60th Fighter Squadron, Single Engine on 17 July 1946

Activated on 20 August 1946
Redesignated 60th Fighter Squadron, Jet on 14 June 1948
Redesignated 60th Fighter-Interceptor Squadron on 20 January 1950
Inactivated on 30 April 1971

- Redesignated 60th Tactical Fighter Squadron on 18 May 1971

Activated on 1 September 1971
Redesignated 60th Fighter Squadron on 1 November 1991
Inactivated on 1 January 2009
Activated on 20 August 2021

=== Assignments ===
- 33d Pursuit Group (later 33d Fighter Group), 15 January 1941 – 8 December 1945
- 33d Fighter Group (later 33d Fighter-Interceptor Group), 20 August 1946
- 4707th Defense Wing (later 4707th Air Defense Wing), 6 February 1952
- 33d Fighter Group, 18 August 1955
- 4735th Air Defense Group, 18 August 1957
- Boston Air Defense Sector, 1 August 1959
- 35th Air Division, 1 April 1966
- 21st Air Division, 19 November 1969 – 30 April 1971
- 33d Tactical Fighter Wing (later 33d Fighter) Wing), 1 September 1971
- 33d Operations Group, 1 December 1991 – 1 January 2009
- 33d Operations Group, 20 August 2021 – present

=== Stations ===
- Mitchel Field, New York, 15 January 1941
- Bolling Field, District of Columbia, 8 December 1941 – 12 October 1942
- Port Lyautey Airfield, French Morocco, 10 November 1942
- Casablanca Airfield, French Morocco, 17 November 1942
- Oujda Airfield, French Morocco, 6 December 1942
- Telergma Airfield, Algeria, 26 December 1942
- Youks-les-Bains Airfield, Algeria, c. 6 January 1943
- Telergma Airfield, Algeria, 17 February 1943
- Berteaux Airfield, Algeria, 2 March 1943
- Ebba Ksour Airfield, Tunisia, 12 April 1943
- Menzel Temime Airfield, Tunisia, 22 May 1943
- Sousse Airfield, Tunisia, 10 June 1943
- Pantelleria Airfield, Italy, 21 June 1943
- Licata Airfield, Sicily, Italy, 17 July 1943
- Paestum Airfield, Italy, 13 September 1943
- Santa Maria Airfield, Italy, 18 November 1943 (operated from Paestum, Italy after 1 December 1943)
- Cercola Airfield, Italy, c. 1 January–c. 5 February 1944
- Karachi Airport, India (now Pakistan), c. 20 February 1944
- Shwangliu Airfield, China, c. 17 April 1944
- Nagaghuli Airfield, India, c. 1 September 1944
- Sahmaw Airfield, Burma, 20 November 1944
- Myitkyina Airfield, Burma, 8 May 1945
- Piardoba Airfield, India, 1 October–15 November 1945
- Camp Shanks, New York, 7–8 December 1945
- AAF Station Neubiberg, Germany, 20 August 1946
- AAF Station Bad Kissingen, Germany, July–25 August 1947
- Andrews Field, Maryland, 25 August 1947
- Roswell Army Air Field (later Roswell Air Force Base, Walker Air Force Base), New Mexico, 16 September 1947
- Otis Air Force Base, Massachusetts, 16 November 1948
- Westover Air Force Base, Massachusetts, 10 August 1950
- Otis Air Force Base, Massachusetts, 18 Aug 1955 – 30 April 1971
- Eglin Air Force Base, Florida, 1 September 1971 – 1 January 2009
- Eglin Air Force Base, Florida, 20 August 2021 – present

=== Aircraft ===
- Bell P-39 Airacobra (1941)
- Curtiss P-40 Warhawk (1941–1944)
- Republic P-47 Thunderbolt (1944–1945)
- Lockheed P-38 Lightning (1945)
- North American P-51 Mustang (1946–1949)
- Republic F-84 Thunderjet (1948–1950)
- North American F-86A Sabre, (1951)
- North American F-86E Sabre, (1951–1953)
- North American F-86D Sabre (1953–1955)
- Lockheed F-94C Starfire (1955–1959)
- McDonnell F-101B Voodoo (1959–1971)
- McDonnell F-4E Phantom II (1971–1979)
- McDonnell Douglas F-15A/B/C/D Eagle (1979–2009)
- Lockheed Martin F-35A Lightning II
