= 58th Fighter Squadron =

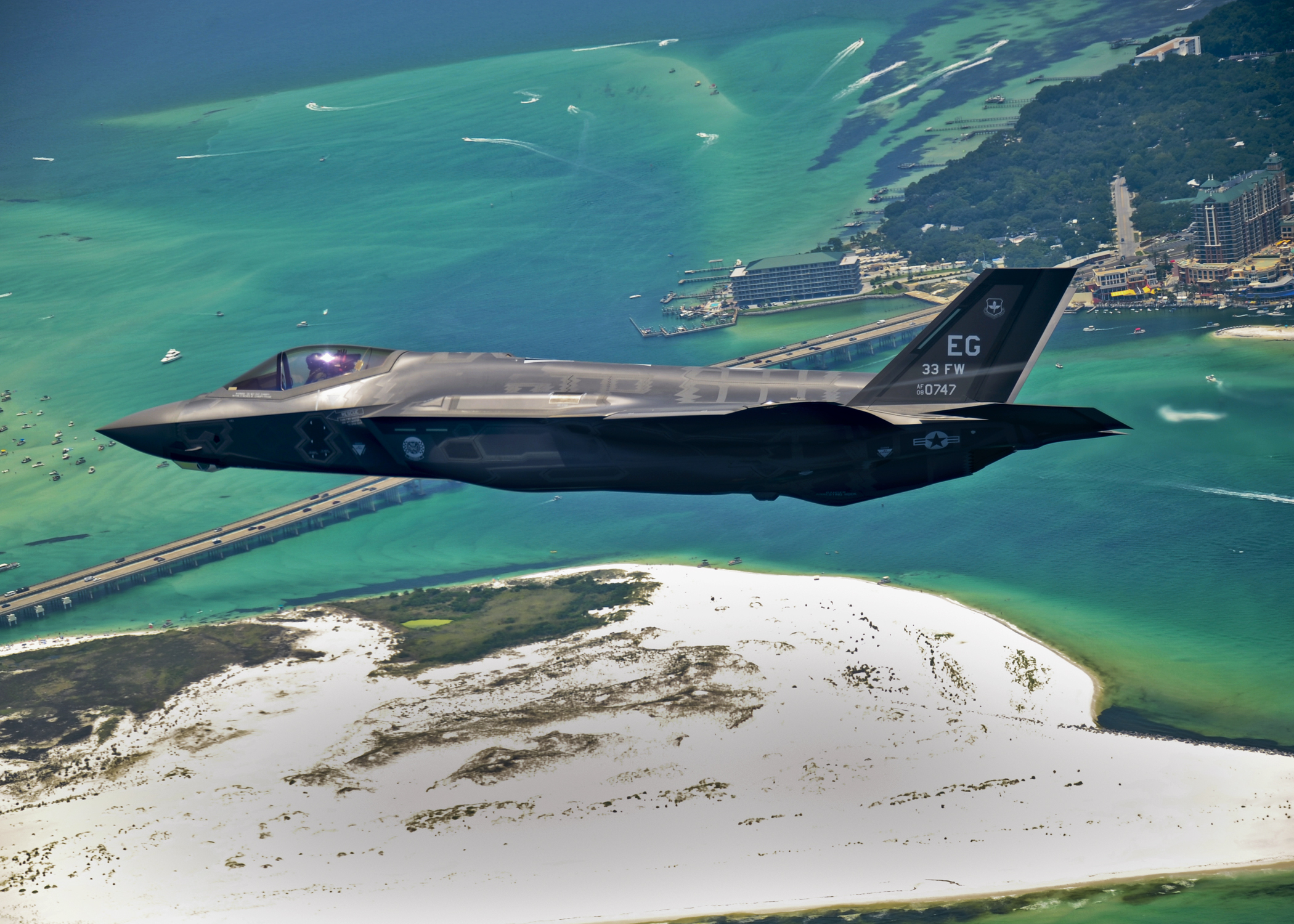
- Eric Smith of the 58th Fighter Squadron, the first Air Force pilot qualified on an F-35, pilots the military's first F-35.
- Active: 1941–1945; 1946–1960; 1970–present
- Country: United States
- Branch: United States Air Force
- Role: Fighter Training
- Part of: Air Combat Command
- Garrison/HQ: Eglin Air Force Base
- Nickname: Gorillas
- Motto: “Rage!”
- Engagements: EAME Theater World War II; Asia-Pacific Theater World War II; Vietnam War; 1991 Gulf War

- Decorations: Distinguished Unit Citation; Air Force Outstanding Unit Award with Combat "V" Device; Air Force Outstanding Unit Award (5x); Republic of Vietnam Gallantry Cross with Palm

Commanders
- Notable commanders: Snacko Capt Charles "REHAB" Remig July 2026-present Capt Nate "Tazer" Palmer December 2025-July 2026

Insignia
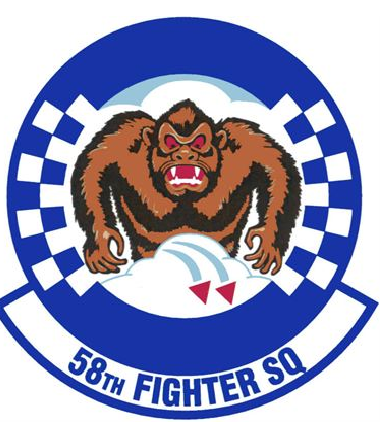
- 58th Fighter Squadron emblem (modified and reinstated 14 July 1971)

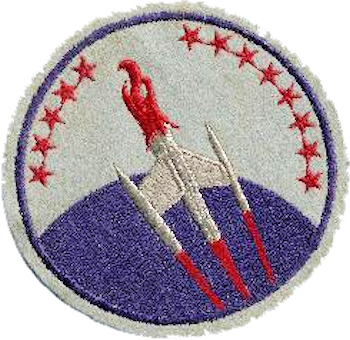
- Patch with 58th Fighter-Interceptor Squadron emblem (approved 30 March 1951)

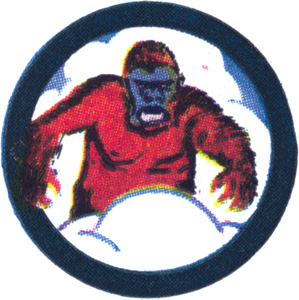
- 58th Fighter Squadron emblem (approved 18 January 1944)

The 58th Fighter Squadron (58 FS) is part of the 33d Fighter Wing, a joint graduate flying and maintenance training wing for the F-35A, B, and C, organized under Air Education and Training Command's 19th Air Force, at Eglin Air Force Base, Florida. Its mission is to train US Air Force operators and maintainers on employment and maintenance of the F-35A Lightning II, as part of the overall 33d FW mission of training American and international aircrews and maintainers of US Air Force, US Navy, US Marine Corps, and international Air Forces.

== History ==
=== World War II ===
Activated as the 58th Pursuit Squadron (part of the 33d Pursuit Group) stationed at Mitchel Field, New York, the squadron was charged with the ongoing mission of aerial defense of the United States. When the United States entered World War II, the 58th took an active role in the war effort by participating in several operations during a three-year overseas tour. These operations include the invasion of Morocco in November 1942, combat operations in the Mediterranean Theater from November 1942 to February 1944, and operations in the China-Burma-India campaign, April 1944 to August 1945. During the operations in the Mediterranean Theater, the 58th earned the nickname "Gorillas" for the guerrilla warfare-like techniques it utilized. While operating in the various theaters, the 58th flew the P-40 Warhawk, P-47 Thunderbolt, and P-38 Lightning. As a result of its superior performance, the 58th received the Distinguished Unit Citation for combat operations conducted in central Tunisia.

=== Air Defense Command ===
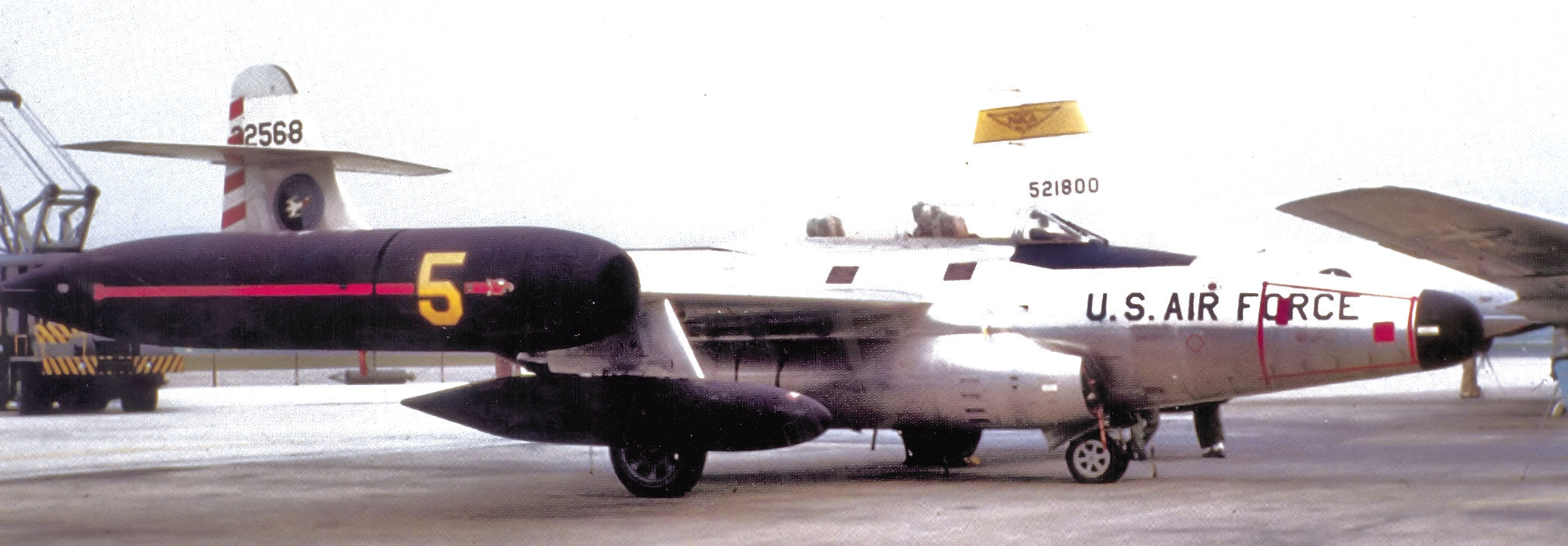
58th Fighter-Interceptor Squadron Northrop F-89D-60-NO Scorpion 53–2528. Stationed at Otis Air Force Base, Massachusetts, 1955.

After its service in World War II, the 58th was reactivated as part of the postwar Air Defense Command in June 1948 at Otis Air Force Base, Massachusetts. Equipped with F-84C Thunderjets, the squadron was part of the 33d Fighter-Interceptor Group, providing air defense over New England. In 1950, the squadron was updated to F-86A Sabre day interceptors, however in 1952 most of the Sabres were sent to the 4th Fighter Group in Korea. Those were replaced by the new F-94B Starfire day/night all-weather dedicated interceptor. In an ADC re-organization, the squadron's parent 33d Fighter Group was replaced by the 4707th Defense (later re-designated Air Defense) Wing, which along with the 59th, 60th, and 437th Fighter-Interceptor squadrons were charged with New England air defense. In 1953 it upgraded to the more advanced F-94C, receiving the new interceptors directly from Lockheed, one of the first squadrons to be equipped with the new aircraft. The squadron was again upgraded two years later, when it received the new F-89D Scorpion from Northrup.

In 1960, it was moved to Walker AFB, New Mexico when it was transferred to the new Albuquerque Air Defense Sector, its new mission being the air defense of the desert Southwest along the border with Mexico. The squadron remained at Walker for a year, until Strategic Air Command assumed full control of the base and it was inactivated at the end of 1960, ending the squadron's air defense mission.

=== Vietnam War ===
This fluctuation of activity leveled out when the 58th, part of the re-designated 33d Tactical Fighter Wing was assigned to Eglin Air Force Base, Florida and began flying the F-4 Phantom II. In 1972, the 58th was deployed to Udorn Royal Thai Air Force Base, Thailand under what was known as the "Summer Help Program." During this period, the 58th was credited as the first temporary duty unit to down an enemy aircraft. On 2 June 1972, Major Philip W. Handley and Lieutenant John J. Smallwood shot down a MiG-19 with a 300-round burst from their M-61A Vulcan Cannon, disproving the perception that American aircrews had lost their dogfighting skills. Smallwood was later shot down and to this day remains listed as missing in action. Just over two months later on 12 August 1972, another 58th fighter was credited with a kill after shooting down a MiG-21 with an AIM-7 Sparrow, a radar guided missile. This second kill was the last credited to the 58th during its six-month rotation in Southeast Asia.

=== Tactical Fighter Squadron ===
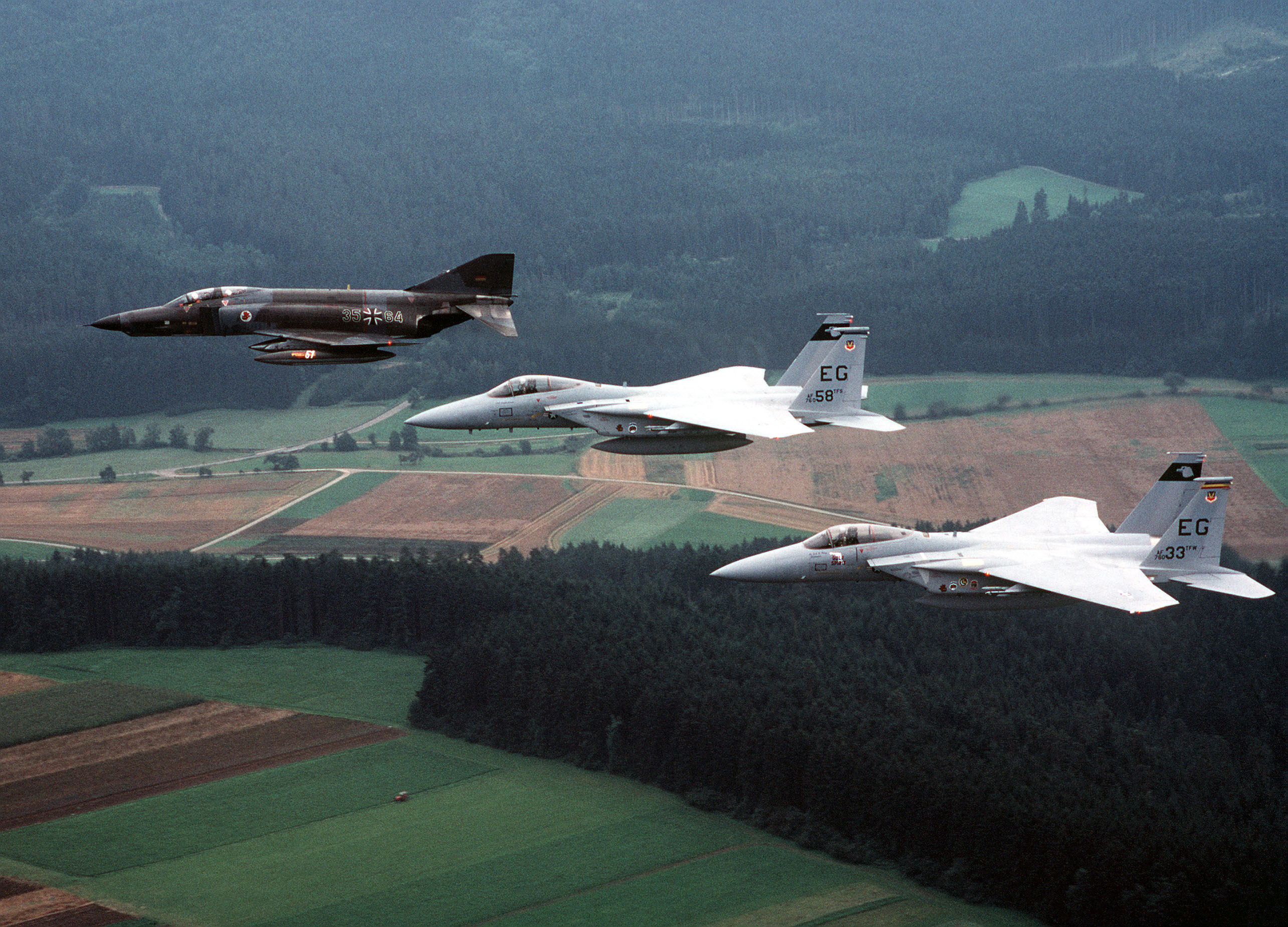
A German RF-4E with two USAF F-15As of the 58th TFS, in 1982

In 1979, the 58th Fighter Squadron became the first squadron in the 33d Tactical Fighter Wing to receive the F-15 Eagle. The 58th proved the war fighting capability of the F-15 during its deployment to Germany for exercise Coronet Eagle. During the exercise, the 58th utilized 18 F-15s to fly 1001 sorties in less than three weeks. The unit repeated this deployment in 1982 utilizing 24 F-15s making it the first full F-15 deployment in history. Ten years later, the 58th participated in Operation Just Cause where forces successfully removed Panamanian dictator Manuel Noriega from power in Panama.

The 58th was once again called upon in August 1990 when Saddam Hussein invaded Kuwait. Twenty-four F-15s under the command of Colonel Rick Parsons departed Eglin Air Force Base for King Faisal Air Base, Saudi Arabia as part of the buildup of coalition forces in Operations Desert Shield and Desert Storm. In the early morning hours of 17 January 1991, Operation Desert Storm commenced. Captain John J.B. Kelk claimed the first aerial victory by downing the first MiG-29. As the war progressed, the 58th flew 1,689 combat sorties and destroyed 15 other enemy aircraft. During the course of the war, the 58th accomplished feats that no other coalition member matched including: the most air-to-air kills, the most double kills, and the most sorties and hours flown by any F-15 unit in theater. The 58th also destroyed the most MiG-29s (a total of five) and had the only wing commander who had an air-to-air victory.

On 25 June 1996, one day before their departure for a scheduled rotation as part of Operation Southern Watch, a terrorist bomb ripped through the Khobar Towers complex that housed squadron personnel. Nineteen U.S. personnel were killed, twelve of which were members of the 33d Fighter Wing.

=== Modern era ===
Some recent accomplishments of the 58th include: the first fighter squadron to bring the AIM-120 Advanced Medium Range Air-to-Air Missile (AMRAAM) into full operation, numerous rotations to the Saudi Arabian theater supporting Operation Southern Watch by patrolling the no-fly zone, and participation in Operation Uphold Democracy where the United States helped bring control back to Haiti.

The 58th Fighter Squadron operated the F-15 Eagle to support the various combatant commanders by providing air superiority on call until September 2009 and then became DoD's first F-35 Lightning II training squadron on 1 Oct. 2009. with seven officers and one enlisted airman. Its first F-35A is expected to arrive in the fall of 2010.

== Lineage ==
- Constituted as the 58th Pursuit Squadron (Interceptor) on 20 November 1940

Activated on 15 January 1941
Redesignated 58th Fighter Squadron on 15 May 1942
Redesignated 58th Fighter Squadron, Two Engine on 8 February 1945
Inactivated on 8 December 1945

- Redesignated 58th Fighter Squadron, on 17 July 1946

Activated on 20 August 1946
Redesignated 58th Fighter Squadron, Jet on 14 June 1948
Redesignated 58th Fighter-Interceptor Squadron on 20 January 1950
Discontinued and inactivated on 25 December 1960

- Redesignated 58th Tactical Fighter Squadron on 16 March 1970

Activated on 1 September 1970
Redesignated 58th Fighter Squadron on 1 Nov 1991

=== Assignments ===
- 33d Pursuit Group (later 33d Fighter Group), 15 January 1941 – 8 December 1945
- 33d Fighter Group (later 33d Fighter-Interceptor Group), 20 August 1946
- 4707th Defense Wing, 6 February 1952
- 564th Air Defense Group, 16 February 1953
- 33d Fighter Group, 18 August 1955
- 4735th Air Defense Group, 18 Aug 1957
- 34th Air Division, 1 August 1959
- Albuquerque Air Defense Sector, 1 January 1960
- Oklahoma City Air Defense Sector, 15 September – 25 December 1960
- 33d Tactical Fighter Wing (later 33 Fighter Wing), 1 September 1970 (attached to 432d Tactical Reconnaissance Wing, 29 April – 14 October 1972, 8th Tactical Fighter Wing, 8 June – 14 September 1973)
- 33d Operations Group, 1 December 1991 – present

=== Stations ===
- Mitchel Field, New York, 15 January 1941 (operated from Farmingdale, New York, 7 – 14 December 1941)
- Philadelphia Municipal Airport, Pennsylvania, 13 December 1941
- Norfolk Army Air Field, Virginia, 16 January 1942
- Langley Field, Virginia, 22 September – 14 October 1942 (operated from Miles Field, California, May – June 1942)
- Port Lyautey Airfield, French Morocco, 10 November 1942
- Thelepte Airfield, Tunisia, 12 December 1942
- Telergma Airfield, Algeria, 7 February 1943
- Berteaux Airfield, Algeria, 2 March 1943
- Ebba Ksour Airfield, Tunisia, 13 April 1943
- Menzel Temime Airfield, Tunisia, 15 May 1943
- Pantelleria, Italy, c. 28 Jun 1943
- Licata Airfield, Sicily, Italy, 18 July 1943
- Paestum Airfield, Italy, 14 September 1943
- Santa Maria Airfield, Italy, 18 November 1943
- Cercola Airfield, Italy, 1 January – c. 6 February 1944
- Karachi, India, c. 18 February 1944
- Pungchacheng Airfield, China, c. 30 April 1944
- Moran Town, India, 31 August 1944
- Sahmaw Airfield, Burma, 26 Dec 1944;
- Dudhkundi Airfield, India, c. 15 May – 15 November 1945
- Camp Shanks, New York, 7 – 8 December 1945
- Neubiberg Air Base, Germany, 20 August 1946
- Bad Kissingen, Germany, July – 25 August 1947
- Andrews Field, Maryland, 25 August 1947
- Roswell Army Air Field (later Walker Air Force Base), New Mexico, 16 September 1947
- Otis Air Force Base, Massachusetts, 16 November 1948
- Walker Air Force Base, New Mexico, 2 August 1959 – 25 December 1960
- Eglin Air Force Base, Florida, 1 September 1970 (deployed to Udorn Royal Thai Air Force Base, Thailand, 29 April – 18 October 1972 and 1 June – 14 September 1973; Tabuk, Saudi Arabia, 28 August 1990 – 12 April 1991; Dhahran Air Base, Saudi Arabia, 9 December 1992 – 17 March 1993, 2 December 1994 – 2 March 1995 and 15 April – 28 June 1996; Shaikh Isa Air Base, Bahrain, 20 November 1997 – 20 June 1998; Incirlik Air Base, Turkey, 12 September – 5 November 1998)

=== Aircraft ===
- Bell P-39 Airacobra (1941)
- Curtiss P-40 Warhawk (1941–1944)
- Republic P-47 Thunderbolt (1944–1945)
- Lockheed P-38 Lightning (1944–1945)
- North American P-51 Mustang (1946–1949)
- Republic F-84 Thunderjet (1948–1950)
- North American F-86A Sabre (1950–1952)
- Lockheed F-94B Starfire (1952–1953)
- Lockheed F-94C Starfire (1953–1955)
- Northrop F-89D Scorpion (1955–1960)
- McDonnell F-4E Phantom II (1970–1979)
- McDonnell Douglas F-15 Eagle (1979–2009)
- F-35 Lightning II (2010–present)

== See also ==
- Cesar Rodriguez
- Chappie James
