= Levi R. Chase =

American flying ace

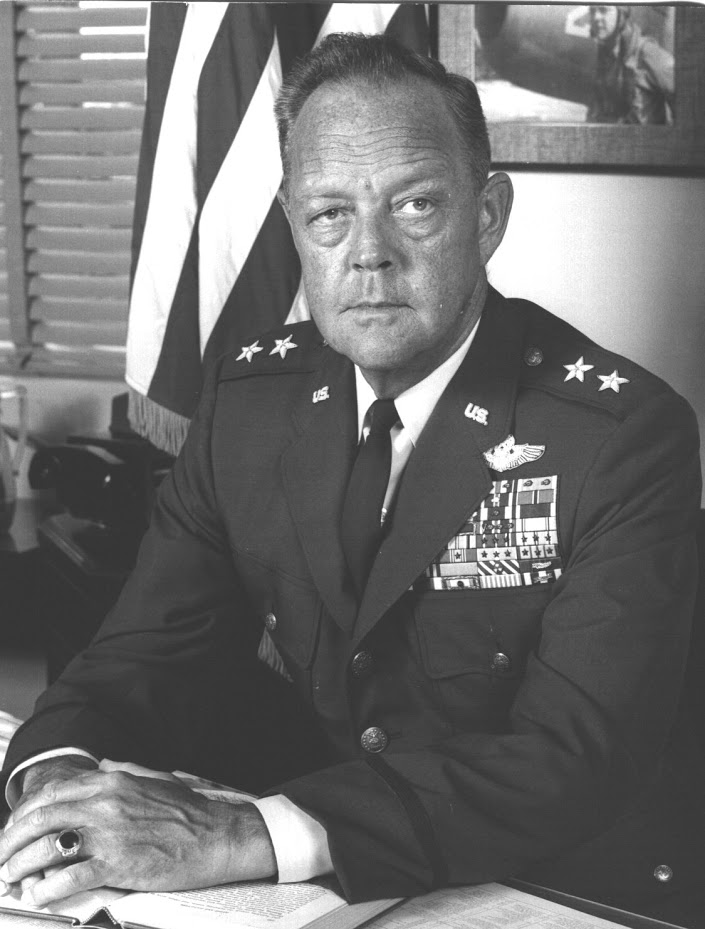
- Major General Levi R. Chase in 1973
- Born: December 23, 1917; Cortland, New York
- Died: September 4, 1994 (aged 76)
- Burial place: Cortland Rural Cemetery, Cortland, New York
- Military career
- Allegiance: United States
- Branch: United States Army Air Forces; United States Air Force
- Service years: 1941–1973
- Rank: Major general
- Commands: Ninth Air Force; 327th Air Division; 12th Tactical Fighter Wing; 15th Tactical Fighter Wing; 3600th Combat Crew Fighter Training Group; 8th Fighter-Bomber Group; 63d Fighter-Interceptor Squadron; First Provisional Fighter Group; Hillsgrove Army Airfield; 60th Fighter Squadron
- Conflicts: World War II; Korean War; Vietnam War
- Awards: Air Force Distinguished Service Medal; Silver Star (3); Legion of Merit (3); Distinguished Flying Cross (United Kingdom) (2); Distinguished Flying Cross (6); Bronze Star Medal; Purple Heart; Air Medal (28)

Major General Levi R. Chase (23 December 1917 – 4 September 1994) was an American fighter pilot and double flying ace during World War II. Chase served for 33 years including four combat tours across three different wars: World War II, Korea, and Vietnam, he flew 512 combat missions in total.

== Early life and education ==
He was born in Cortland, New York, in 1917. He graduated from Cortland High School, in 1936, and attended Syracuse University from 1937 through 1940.

== Military career ==
He entered active military duty in the United States Army Air Corps as an aviation cadet in February 1941, and graduated from advanced flying training at Maxwell Field, Alabama, with his commission as Second lieutenant in the Army Air Corps and pilot wings in September 1941.

He then was assigned to the 8th Pursuit Group (Interceptor) at Mitchel Field, New York, as a pilot. He joined the 58th Pursuit Squadron, 33d Pursuit Group, at Philadelphia, Pennsylvania, in December 1941. As a member of the 33d Pursuit Group, he flew a P-40 Warhawk from the aircraft carrier USS Chenango during Operation Torch, the Allied invasion of North Africa. As commander of the 60th Fighter Squadron he completed his first combat tour as the leading American ace in Tunisia with 10 victories.

From July 1943 to March 1944, he served as an assistant operations officer for the I Fighter Command Headquarters at Mitchel Field. From March through June 1944 he was base commander at Hills Grove Army Air Field, New York, and then operations officer and later deputy commander, 2d Air Commando Group, Lakeland Army Air Field, Florida.

He went with the 2d Air Commando Group to the China Burma India Theater of Operations in July 1944 and served as deputy commander and later became commander of the First Provisional Group. He is credited with the destruction of two Japanese fighter aircraft and is one of the few American pilots to have shot down aircraft flown by three major Axis powers during World War II. He planned and led the longest fighter-bomber raid until that time made by the Army Air Forces, some 1,800 miles (2,900 km), from Cox's Bazar, India, to attack the Don Muang Airfield in Bangkok, Thailand.

Chase became a member of the Inactive Reserve in May 1945 and returned to civilian life as a New York State veteran's counselor. During this time he attended the Albany Law School, New York, from 1946 to 1949.

He was recalled to active military duty in April 1951. He served successively as the deputy commander of the 1st Fighter Group, Griffiss Air Force Base, New York; executive officer of the 56th Fighter Interceptor Wing, Selfridge Air Force Base, Michigan; and then commander of the 63d Fighter Interceptor Squadron, Oscoda Air Force Base, Michigan. In November 1951 he went to Osan Air Base, South Korea. During his tour of duty in Korea, he was named deputy for operations, 51st Fighter Interceptor Wing, and later he commanded the 8th Fighter-Bomber Group. He flew combat missions in the F-86 Sabre and the F-80 Shooting Star. In June 1952, he led the 8th Fighter-Bomber Group's attack on the Sui-ho Dam.

In December 1952 he assumed command of the 3600th Combat Crew Fighter Training Group, Luke Air Force Base, Arizona, where he organized the original Thunderbirds aerial demonstration team. In June 1955 he became a student at the Air War College, Maxwell Air Force Base, Alabama. After graduation in June 1956, he served for three years as chief of both the Air Defense Branch and the Tactical Branch of the Inspector General's Office at Norton Air Force Base, California.

He attended the National War College, Washington, D.C., from August 1959 to June 1960. He spent the next four years in West Germany where he served with the 50th Tactical Fighter Wing, Hahn Air Base, and then the 7499th Support Group, Wiesbaden Air Base. In July 1964 he was named commander of the 15th Tactical Fighter Wing, MacDill Air Force Base, Florida.

He was transferred to Cam Ranh Bay Air Base, South Vietnam, in October 1965 as commander of the 12th Tactical Fighter Wing. In September 1966 he completed his 500th combat mission flying an F-4C Phantom on a ground attack mission. In December 1966 he was transferred to Kadena Air Base, Okinawa, as vice commander of the 313th Air Division. In November 1967 he became commander of the 327th Air Division and chief, Air Section, Military Assistance Advisory Group, Taiwan.

In July 1969 he was assigned to Tactical Air Command Headquarters, Langley Air Force Base, Virginia, as assistant deputy chief of staff, operations, and in October 1970 became deputy chief of staff, personnel. He became vice commander of the Ninth Air Force at Shaw Air Force Base, South Carolina, in July 1971. He was promoted to commander Ninth Air Force, effective 1 June 1973. He retired from the USAF on 1 December 1973.

== Awards and decorations ==
His military decorations included: Silver Star (2 oak leaf clusters), Distinguished Flying Cross (5 oak leaf clusters), Bronze Star Medal, Purple Heart, Air Medal (27 oak leaf clusters), the British Distinguished Flying Cross and Bar, the Croix de Guerre (with palm), and the Republic of China Order of Cloud and Banner 4th Class.

USAF Command Pilot Badge
Air Force Distinguished Service Medal		Silver Star with two bronze oak leaf clusters
Legion of Merit with two bronze oak leaf clusters	Distinguished Flying Cross with silver oak leaf cluster	Bronze Star Medal
Purple Heart	Air Medal with four silver oak leaf clusters	Air Medal with silver and bronze oak leaf clusters (second ribbon required for accouterment spacing)
Army Commendation Medal	Air Force Presidential Unit Citation with bronze oak leaf cluster	Air Force Outstanding Unit Award with Valor device and bronze oak leaf cluster
American Defense Service Medal	American Campaign Medal	European-African-Middle Eastern Campaign Medal with three bronze campaign stars
Asiatic–Pacific Campaign Medal with three bronze campaign stars	World War II Victory Medal	Army of Occupation Medal
National Defense Service Medal with service star	Korean Service Medal with three bronze campaign stars	Vietnam Service Medal with three bronze campaign stars
Air Force Longevity Service Award with silver and bronze oak leaf clusters	Armed Forces Reserve Medal	Distinguished Flying Cross with Bar (United Kingdom)
Croix de Guerre with Palm (France)	Order of the Cloud and Banner; Fourth class (Republic of China)	Republic of Korea Presidential Unit Citation
United Nations Service Medal for Korea	Vietnam Campaign Medal	Korean War Service Medal
