= 33rd Operations Group =

US Air Force training unit

33d Operations Group

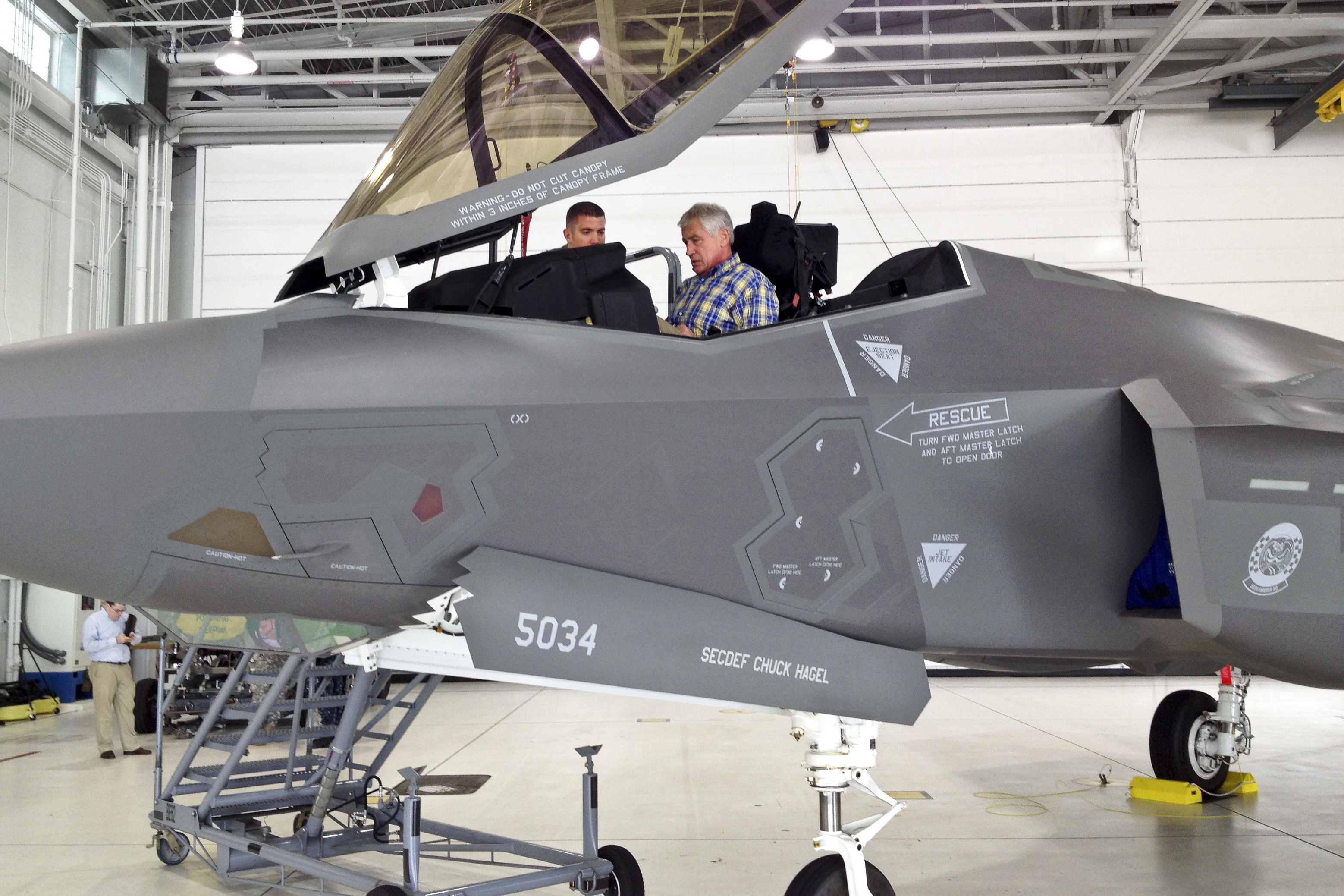
- Defense Secretary Chuck Hagel sits in a group F-35A Lightning II at Eglin AFB
- Active: 1941–1945; 1946–1952; 1955–1957; 1991–present
- Country: United States
- Branch: United States Air Force
- Role: Fighter operations and training
- Part of: 33d Fighter Wing
- Garrison/HQ: Eglin Air Force Base
- Nickname: Nomads
- Motto: Fire From the Clouds
- Engagements: Mediterranean Theater of Operations; China Burma India Theater; Vietnam War
- Decorations: Distinguished Unit Citation Air Force Outstanding Unit Award

Commanders
- Notable commanders: Col. Elwood R. Quesada; Col. William W. Momyer; Col. Willard W. Millikan

Insignia
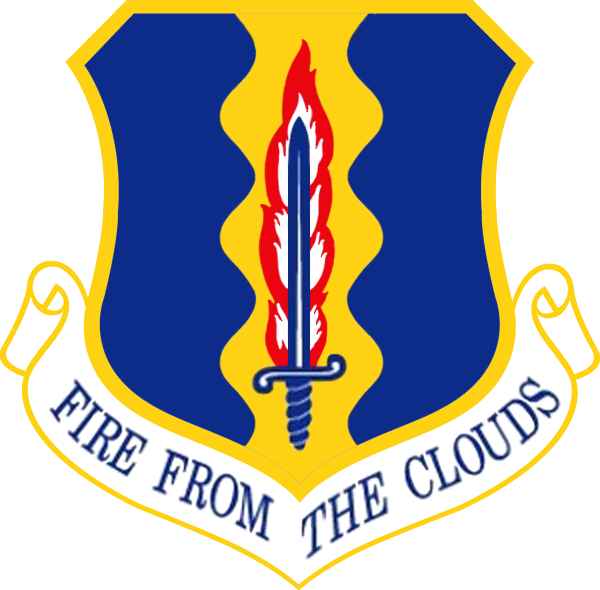
- 33d Operations Group emblem (approved 21 February 1942) (Note: The emblem was approved for the 33d Fighter Wing on 5 October 1965. Ravenstein, p. 60. While the group is assigned to the wing, it uses the form approved for the wing with the group designation on the scroll. Dollman, AFHRA Factsheet 33 Operations Group)

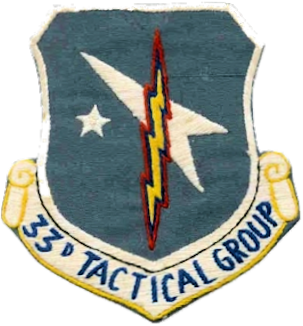
- Patch with 33d Tactical Group emblem

The 33d Operations Group is the flying component of the 33d Fighter Wing, assigned to Air Combat Command of the United States Air Force. The group is stationed at Eglin Air Force Base, Florida.

The group was first activated in January 1941 as the 33d Pursuit Group and began training in fighter operations at Mitchel Field, New York. Following the attack on Pearl Harbor the group moved to Philadelphia, where it assumed an air defense role while training for combat. After being redesignated the 33d Fighter Group, it moved to the Mediterranean Theater of Operations in November 1942 as part of Operation Torch, the invasion of North Africa, flying its planes to its first base in Morocco from the aircraft carrier USS Chenango of the United States Navy. The group served in North Africa and Italy until February 1944, earning a Distinguished Unit Citation in January 1943 for its defense of its base from attacks by German and Italian aircraft.

In 1944, the group departed Italy for the China-Burma-India Theater, leaving its Curtiss P-40 Warhawks behind for Lockheed P-38 Lightnings and Republic P-47 Thunderbolts. It continued combat operations until the surrender of Japan. In November 1945, it returned to the United States and was inactivated when it arrived at the Army's port of embarkation. (Note: Specific port is not stated. POE's were Army commands managing troops & cargo from origin, through the command, to destinations. The commands included "port facilities" but also military camps well beyond "port" areas.)

The group was activated as part of the Occupation Forces at Neubiberg Air Base, Germany, where it took over the personnel and equipment of the 357th Fighter Group, which was inactivated and transferred to the National Guard. In July 1947, its personnel became the cadre for the 86th Composite Group, while the group made two moves without personnel or equipment before arriving at Roswell Army Air Field, where it equipped with North American P-51 Mustangs and became part of the fledgling Strategic Air Command. A year later, it received its first jet aircraft, the Republic F-84 Thunderjet. In 1948. the group moved to Otis Air Force Base, Massachusetts, where it assumed an air defense role, first under Continental Air Command, then under Air Defense Command (ADC) as the 33d Fighter-Interceptor Group. It was inactivated in February 1952 when ADC reorganized its forces on a geographic basis.

ADC activated the group, once more the 33d Fighter Group, at Otis in August 1955 as part of Project Arrow, a program to replace ADC's Air Defense Groups with fighter groups with distinguished combat records in World War II. As Otis expanded to add the airborne early warning and control mission the following year, the group's support units were transferred to the newly reactivated 33d Fighter Wing. In 1957, the group and wing were inactivated and the group's flying squadrons were transferred to the Boston Air Defense Sector

As the United States Air Force implemented the Objective wing reorganization in 1991, the 33d, now designated the 33d Operations Group, was activated to command the 33d Fighter Wing's operational units. It flew the McDonnell Douglas F-15 Eagle until 2009, when it began the transition to the Lockheed Martin F-35 Lightning II Joint Strike Fighter.

== Overview ==
From its reactivation in December 1991, as part of the 33d Fighter Wing, the 33d Operations Group has deployed aircraft and personnel to Saudi Arabia, Canada, the Caribbean, South America, Jamaica, Iceland, Italy, and Puerto Rico and participated in Operation Southern Watch, Operation Coronet Macaw; Operation Restore Hope, Operation Support Justice III and IV, and Operation Uphold Democracy.

These deployments included combat as well as assistance in the United States war on drugs. The 33d lost members of three of its squadrons in the Khobar Towers bombing, Saudi Arabia on 25 June 1996.

== Mission ==
The mission of the group is to train Air Force and international partner pilots and maintainers of the Lockheed Martin F-35 Lightning II Joint Strike Fighter.

== Units ==
The 33d Group has four squadrons assigned:

- 33d Operations Support Squadron: Known as the "Jokers", the 33d Operations Support Squadron provides operational intelligence training, weapons and tactics, aircrew flight equipment, training and scheduling support.
- 58th Fighter Squadron: Known as the "Mighty Gorillas", the 58th Fighter Squadron is the flying unit of the group and operates 24 F-35A aircraft training Air Force and international partner pilots. They also possess two Royal Netherlands Air Force F-35As.
- 60th Fighter Squadron: Known as the "Crows", the 60th Fighter Squadron is the flying unit of the group and will operate 24 F-35A aircraft training Air Force pilots.
- 337th Air Control Squadron: Known as the "Doghouse" and located at Tyndall Air Force Base, Florida, the 337th Air Control Squadron trains air battle managers for the Air Force, Air National Guard and Air Force Reserve Command. Additionally, its members provide command and control support for Tyndall's F-22 Raptor training mission and train international officers for tactical command and control operations.

== History ==
=== World War II ===
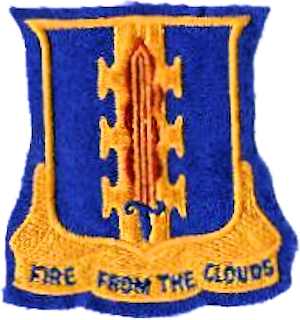
Emblem of the 33d Fighter Group

The 33d Fighter Group was activated early in 1941 as the 33d Pursuit Group with the 58th, 59th, and 60th Pursuit Squadrons assigned. It trained with Bell P-39 Airacobras in 1941, but soon changed to Curtiss P-40 Warhawks and served as part of the United States defense force for the east coast after the Japanese attack on Pearl Harbor. Its 58th and 59th squadrons were based on the West Coast in May and June 1942 to provide additional air defense there.

The group was requested as air support for the Western Task Force of Operation Torch and assigned on 19 September 1942. Its 77 P-40Es moved from Hampton Roads, Virginia, to North Africa on the deck of the USS Chenango as part of the invasion force on 8 November 1942. Pilots had been given brief training at Philadelphia in carrier launches but the Navy had serious misgivings about the aircraft's ability to withstand the strain and the pilot's ability to launch by catapult from the escort carrier. With securing of the Port Lyautey airfield on 10 November the launch from Chenango began and was successful but the airfield's runways were so damaged that the launch was discontinued and not completed until two days later. Two of the 77 aircraft were lost to a crash and vanishing in a fog with 17 damaged in landing with none getting into action. The 35 planes of the group following on D+5 aboard the British carrier HMS Archer also were launched to land at the Port Lyautey airfield and suffered four loses on landing due to pilot inexperience.

Meanwhile, the group's ground echelon sailed for Morocco aboard the USS Susan B. Anthony (AP-72). Shortly after the squadron's arrival in North Africa, a provisional "J Squadron" was organized, commanded by Lt. Col. Philip Cochran, at Rabat. The squadron was organized to provide an advanced replacement center for aircraft and pilots. On 6 December, the 58th squadron moved forward to Thelepte Airfield, where it became the first American air unit stationed in Tunisia.

The unit operated with Twelfth Air Force in the Mediterranean theater until February 1944, providing close air support for ground forces, and bombing and strafing personnel concentrations, port installations, fuel dumps, bridges, highways, and rail lines. The 33d received a Distinguished Unit Citation for action on 15 January 1943 when nine German Junkers Ju 88 bombers escorted by four Italian Macchi C.202 fighters attempted to knock out the group's base at Thelepte. Group airplanes on combat air patrol drove off the escorting fighters. Other group planes took off while the field was being bombed. The group destroyed eight of the attackers, and the ninth was shot down by antiaircraft fire.

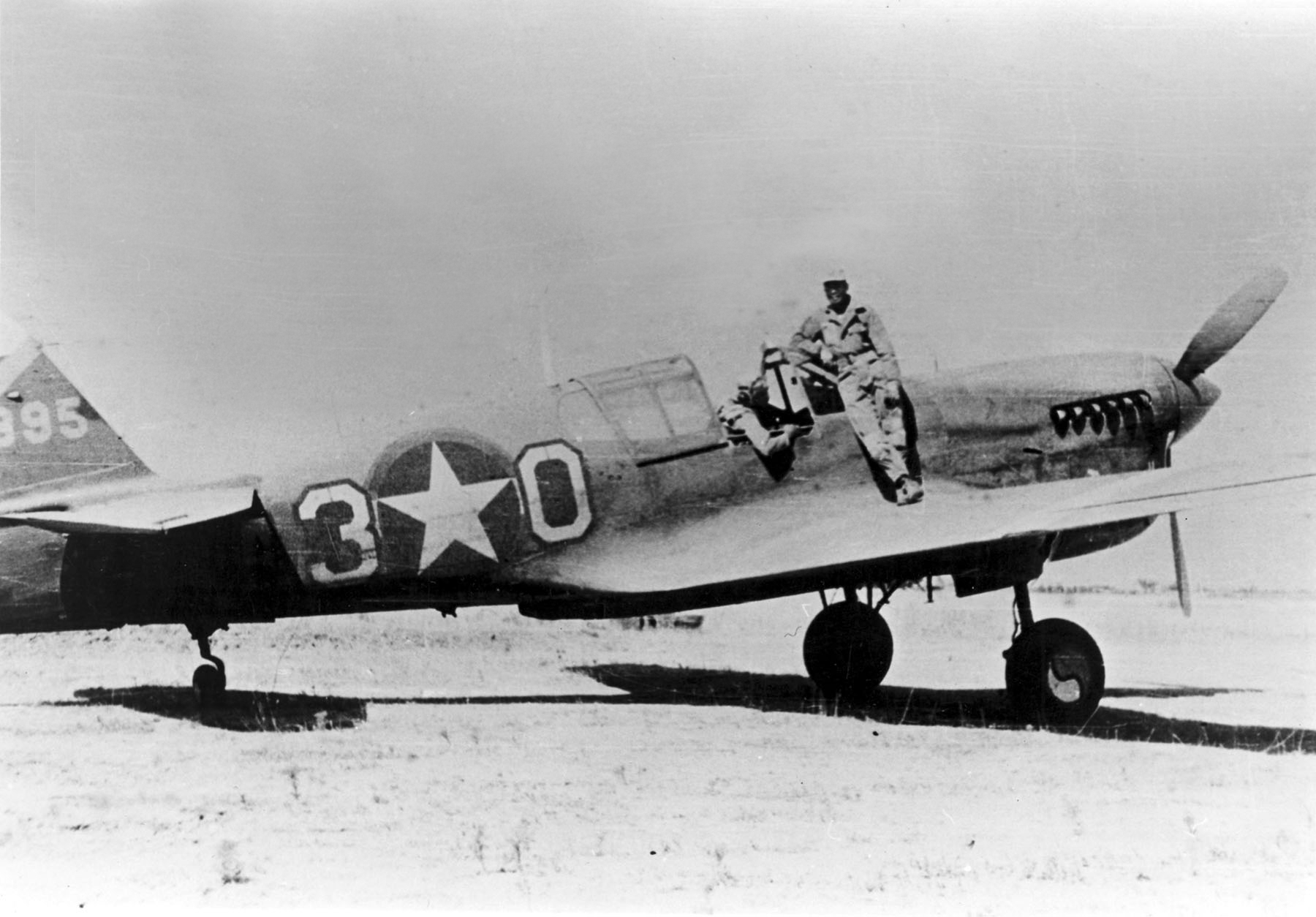
Curtiss P-40L of 99th Fighter Squadron in North Africa 1943

In May 1943 the 99th Fighter Squadron, the first AAF unit to enter combat with black personnel, was attached to the group, and again from August to October 1943. It took part in the reduction of Pantelleria and flew patrol missions while Allied troops landed after surrender of the enemy's garrison. It also participated in the invasion and conquest of Sicily by supporting landings at Salerno. The group supported additional landings in southern Italy, and the beachhead at Anzio.

After moving to India in February 1944, the group trained with Lockheed P-38 Lightnings and Republic P-47 Thunderbolts. It then moved to China where it continued training and flew patrol and intercept missions. Upon returning to India in September 1944, it flew dive bombing and strafing missions in Burma until the Allied campaigns in that area had been completed.

33d Ftr Gp

Aerial Victories	Number	Note
Group Hq	11	(Note: 8 of the 11 victories by the Group Hq were credited to the commander, Lt Col. William W. Momyer)
58th Fighter Squadron	48.5
59th Fighter Squadron	35
60th Fighter Squadron	28
Group Total	122.5	(Note: Each of the squadrons scored additional victories during Desert Storm and the 58th during the Vietnam War, but they were not assigned to the group at the time.)

=== Occupation forces ===
In August 1946, the 33d Fighter Group took over the personnel and equipment of the 357th Fighter Group at Neubiberg Air Base and began service as part of the United States occupation force in Germany, initially operating North American P-51 Mustangs. The 357th was inactivated and transferred to the National Guard. In July 1947, the 33d's personnel became the cadre for the 86th Composite Group, while the group made two moves without personnel or equipment to Bad Kissingen Airfield, Germany and Andrews Field, Maryland.

=== Cold War ===
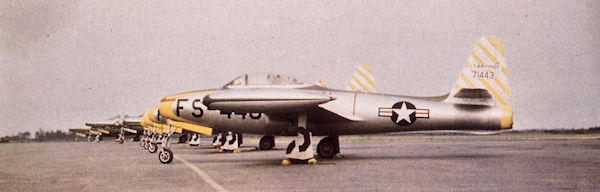
Republic P-84C of the 59th Fighter Squadron (Note: Aircraft is P-84C-2-RE Thunderjet serial 47-1994)

The group was organized as an operational unit at Roswell Army Air Field, New Mexico on 16 August 1947, where it again equipped with Mustangs and became part of Eighth Air Force of Strategic Air Command. At Roswell, the group participated in the experimental Wing Base organization, which was intended to unify control at air bases under a single wing. As a result, the group was assigned to the 33d Fighter Wing. The test proved successful, and the wing-base plan was adopted by the Air Force.

A year later, in June 1948, it received its first jet aircraft, the Republic F-84 Thunderjet. The group was the second in the Air Force to fly the F-84C model of the Thunderjet. A few months later the group moved to Otis Air Force Base, Massachusetts, where it assumed an air defense role, first under Continental Air Command, then under Air Defense Command (ADC) as the 33d Fighter-Interceptor Group.

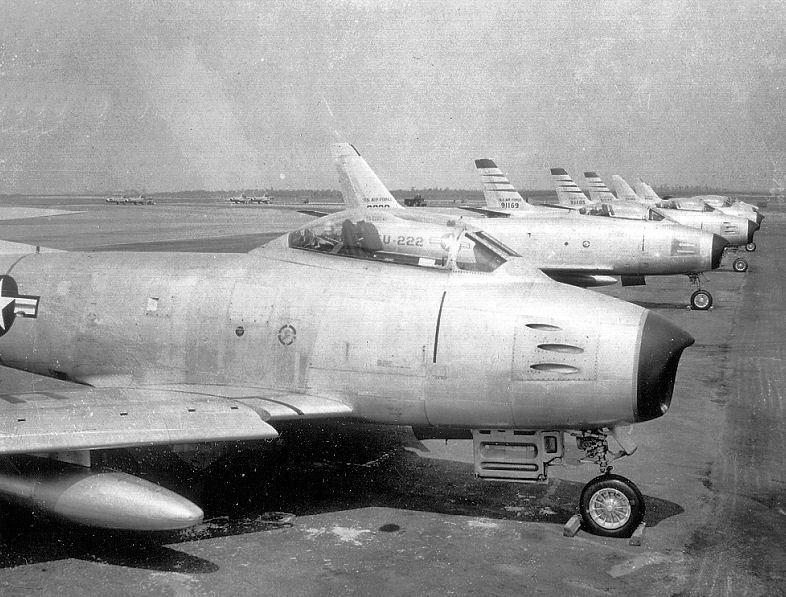
North American F-86As at Otis AFB.

There it trained to maintain tactical proficiency and participated in exercises and aerial demonstrations. In February 1949, the group transitioned to North American F-86A Sabres. By December the group had completed its transition to Sabres and assumed an air defense mission, providing air defense in the northeastern US. Toward the end of 1949, ADC was inactivated and the group and its parent wing became elements of Continental Air Command. In December 1950 ADC was reactivated, and the group, which since spring had been designated as the 33d Fighter-Interceptor Group rejoined the command. Because of ADC's need to expand its coverage, the group dispersed the 60th Fighter-Interceptor Squadron to Westover Air Force Base, Massachusetts in August 1950. The group was inactivated in February 1952 along with the 33d Fighter Wing in a major reorganization of ADC responding to ADC's difficulty under the existing wing base organizational structure in deploying fighter squadrons to best advantage. Fighter-interceptor groups and wings were replaced by regionally organized air defense wings.

The 564th Air Base Group was activated on 1 February 1952 to replace the support elements of the 33d Fighter-Interceptor Wing. The group became the 564th Air Defense Group in February 1953 when it assumed control of fighter-interceptor squadrons at Otis. The unit was replaced by the reactivated 33d Fighter Group (Air Defense) as part of ADC's "Project Arrow", which reactivated fighter units that had achieved distinction in the two world wars.

The 33d Fighter Group was assigned to ADC's 4707th Air Defense Wing, and in 1956 reunited with the 33d Fighter Wing (Air Defense). Again, it provided air defense in northeastern US flying the Northrop F-89 Scorpion. It was also the host organization for USAF units until 1956, and was assigned several support organizations to fulfill this function. when the 33d Fighter Wing was activated and the group was assigned to it once again, along with the support units assigned to the group. The group was inactivated on 18 August 1957 and replaced by 4735th Air Defense Group when the 551st Airborne Early Warning and Control Wing assumed host responsibilities for Otis from the 33d Fighter-Interceptor Wing.

=== Vietnam War ===
On 8 July 1963 the 33d Tactical Group was activated in Viet Nam. It was equipped primarily with cargo aircraft. Its mission was to maintain and operate base support facilities at Tan Son Nhut Air Base, supporting the 2d Air Division and subordinate units by performing reconnaissance of Vietnam from various detachments flying Douglas RB-26 Invader, Martin RB-57 Canberra, and McDonnell RF-101C Voodoo aircraft.

The 33d Tactical Group performed administrative and maintenance tasks and set up detachments at smaller, outlying airfields, the 33d assuming responsibility for Can Tho and Nha Trang Air Bases. The group inactivated in July 1965, and its aircraft, personnel and equipment were transferred to the 6250th Combat Support Group. While the 33d Tactical Group was inactive, it was consolidated with the 33d Fighter Group as the 33d Tactical Fighter Group.

=== Contingency operations ===
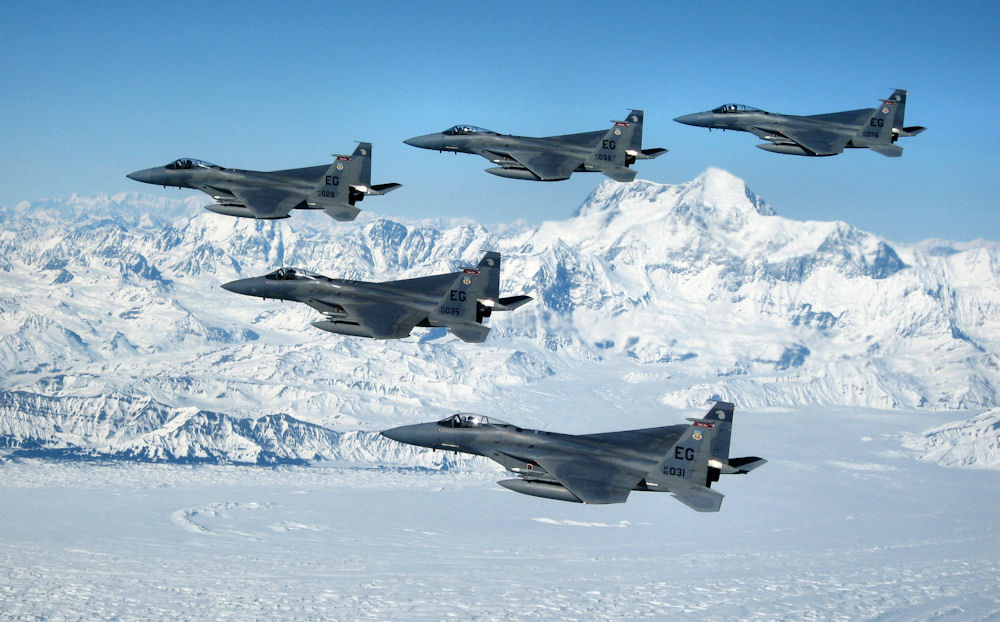
Five F-15Cs from the 33d Fighter Wing during a deployment to Elmendorf AFB

As the 33d Fighter Wing reorganized under the Objective Wing system on 1 December 1991, the group was activated as the 33d Operations Group and once more assigned its original three squadrons, which were equipped with the McDonnell Douglas F-15 Eagle, together with an operations support squadron. In May 1992 the group was enlarged by the assignment of the 728th Air Control Squadron at Duke Field when the 507th Air Control Wing inactivated.

From 1992 through 2002 the group deployed aircraft and personnel to Saudi Arabia, Canada, the Caribbean, South America, Jamaica, Iceland, Italy, and Puerto Rico and participated in various operations. The group lost members of its 58th and 60th Fighter Squadron and 33d Operations Support Squadron in the Khobar Towers bombing in Saudi Arabia on 25 June 1996 during one of these deployments.

In 1999, as a result of the administration reductions in military spending, the group lost six of its F-15s. The 59th squadron inactivated on 15 April as a result and the remainder of its aircraft were split between the other two squadrons.

The group engaged in air expeditionary operations in various combat areas as part of the global war on terrorism.

In May 2008, the 728th Air Control Squadron was reassigned to the 552d Air Control Wing. The group continued to shrink when, on 1 October 2008, the 60th Fighter Squadron flew its last sortie with the Eagle and became non-operational. It inactivated on 1 January 2009. In July, the group stopped operating F-15s in anticipation of receiving the Lockheed Martin F-35 Lightning II Joint Strike Fighter. For more than a year, it would remain without assigned aircraft.

=== Lightning II training ===
The group mission changed in addition to its change of aircraft, and on 1 October 2009, the group became part of Air Education and Training Command in preparation for its new role of conducting joint training on the Joint Strike Fighter.

However, the F-35 program was delayed and in January 2011, the group received its first aircraft in 17 months, when four General Dynamics F-16 Fighting Falcon aircraft borrowed from the 56th Fighter Wing at Luke Air Force Base, Arizona arrived to prepare the group's instructor pilots for the Lightning II. The F-16's flying characteristics are similar to those of the F-35, and would prepare group pilots to transition into its new plane on arrival. On 14 July 2011, the group received its first Lightning II for training. Lt Col Christine Mau, the deputy commander of the group, became the first woman to fly the F-35 on 5 May 2015, when she completed her first training flight. In July of 2026, the 33d Fighter Wing and 33d Operations Group returned to Air Combat Command, and was placed in the Fifteenth Air Force.

== Lineage ==
33d Operations Group

- Constituted as the 33d Pursuit Group (Interceptor) on 20 November 1940

Activated on 15 January 1941
Redesignated 33d Fighter Group on 15 May 1942
Inactivated on 8 December 1945

- Activated on 20 August 1946

Redesignated 33d Fighter-Interceptor Group on 20 January 1950
Inactivated on 6 February 1952

- Redesignated 33d Fighter Group (Air Defense) on 20 June 1955

Activated on 18 August 1955
Inactivated on 18 August 1957

- Consolidated with the 33d Tactical Group as the 33d Tactical Fighter Group on 31 July 1985 (remained inactive)
- Redesignated 33d Operations Group and activated on 1 December 1991

33d Tactical Group

- Constituted as the 33d Tactical Group and activated on 19 June 1963

Organized on 8 July 1963
Discontinued, and inactivated on 8 July 1965

- Consolidated with the 33d Fighter Group (Air Defense) as the 33d Tactical Fighter Group on 31 July 1985

=== Assignments ===
- 7th Pursuit Wing, 15 January 1941
- 1 Interceptor (later I Interceptor, I Fighter) Command, 2 October 1941
- Philadelphia Air Defense Wing, 11 August 1942
- XII Air Support Command, November 1942
- XII Fighter Command, 6 December 1942
- XII Air Support Command, 13 January 1943
- XII Air Force Service Command, 18 February 1943
- XII Bomber Command, 1 March 1943
- 47th Bombardment Wing, 3 March 1943
- XII Air Support Command, 14 March 1943
- 3rd Air Defense (later 64th Fighter) Wing, 24 July 1943
- XII Air Support Command, 21 December 1943

Under operational control of 64th Fighter Wing, 21 December 1943 – February 1944

- AAF India-Burma Sector, c. 20 February 1944

Attached to CBI Air Forces Training Command, 5 March – 14 April 1944

- Fourteenth Air Force, 15 April 1944
- 312th Fighter Wing, 11 May 1944
- Tenth Air Force, 24 August 1944 – November 1945
- 70th Fighter Wing, 20 August 1946
- Strategic Air Command, 25 August 1947
- Eighth Air Force, 16 September 1947
- 33d Fighter Wing (later 33d Fighter-Interceptor Wing), 5 November 1947 – 6 February 1952

Attached to 509th Bombardment Wing, 17 November 1947 – 15 November 1948

- 4707th Air Defense Wing, 18 August 1955
- 33d Fighter Wing (Air Defense), 18 October 1956 – 18 August 1957
- Pacific Air Forces, 19 June 1963 (not organized)
- 2d Air Division, 8 July 1963 – 8 July 1965
- 33d Fighter Wing, 1 December 1991 – present

=== Components ===
Tactical Squadrons

- 58th Pursuit Squadron (later 58th Fighter Squadron 58th Fighter-Interceptor Squadron, 58th Fighter Squadron): 15 January 1941 – 8 December 1945; 20 August 1946 – 6 February 1952; 18 August 1955 – 18 August 1957; 1 December 1991 – present
- 59th Pursuit Squadron (later 59th Fighter Squadron 59th Fighter-Interceptor Squadron, 59th Fighter Squadron): 15 January 1941 – 8 December 1945; 20 August 1946 – 6 February 1952; 1 December 1991 – 15 April 1999
- 60th Pursuit Squadron (later 60th Fighter Squadron 60th Fighter-Interceptor Squadron, 60th Fighter Squadron): 15 January 1941 – 8 December 1945; 20 August 1946 – 6 February 1952; 18 August 1955 – 18 August 1957; 1 December 1991 – 1 January 2009. 20 August 2021 – present
- 99th Fighter Squadron (attached): 29 May 1943 – c. 29 June 1943; 19 July 1943 – 16 October 1943
- 459th Fighter Squadron: 12 May – 5 November 1945
- 481st Tactical Fighter Squadron – Attached 15 June – 8 July 1965
- 337th Air Control Squadron: 3 October 2012 – present
- 728th Air Control Squadron: 1 May 1992 – 1 May 2008

Support Units

- 33d USAF Hospital (later 33d USAF Dispensary), 18 August 1955 – 18 October 1956; 8 July 1963 – 8 July 1965
- 13th Reconnaissance Technical Squadron, 8 July 1963 – 8 July 1965
- 33d Air Base Squadron, 8 July 1963 – 8 July 1965
- 33d Field Maintenance Squadron (later 33d Consolidated Aircraft Maintenance Squadron), 18 August 1955 – 18 October 1956; 8 July 1963 – 8 July 1965
- 33d Installations Squadron, 18 August 1955 – 18 October 1956
- 33d Motor Vehicle Squadron, 18 August 1955 – 18 October 1956
- 33d Operations Squadron (later 33d Operations Support Squadron), 18 August 1955 – 18 October 1956, 1 December 1991 – present
- 33d Supply Squadron, 18 August 1955 – 18 October 1956
- 27th Crash Rescue Boat Flight, 18 August 1955 – 18 October 1956

=== Stations ===
- Mitchel Field, New York, 15 January 1941
- Philadelphia Airport, Pennsylvania, 13 December 1941 – October 1942
- Port Lyautey Airfield, French Morocco, 10 November 1942
- Casablanca Airfield, French Morocco, c. 13 November 1942
- Telergma Airfield, Algeria, 24 December 1942
- Thelepte Airfield, Tunisia, 7 January 1943
- Youks-les-Bains Airfield, Algeria, 8 February 1943
- Telergma Airfield, Algeria, c. 20 February 1943
- Berteaux Airfield, Algeria, c. 2 March 1943
- Ebba Ksour Airfield, Tunisia, c. 12 April 1943
- Menzel Temime Airfield, Tunisia, 20 May 1943
- Sousse Airfield, Tunisia, 9 June 1943
- Pantelleria Airport, 19 June 1943
- Licata Airfield, Sicily, c. 18 July 1943
- Paestum Airfield, Italy, 13 September 1943
- Santa Maria Airfield, Italy, 18 November 1943
- Cercola Airfield, Italy, c. 1 January – February 1944
- Karachi Airport, India, c. 20 February 1944
- Shwangliu Airfield, China, c. 18 April 1944
- Pungchacheng Airfield, China, 9 May 1944
- Nagaghuli Airfield, India, 3 September 1944
- Sahmaw Airfield, Burma, 26 December 1944
- Piardoba Airfield, India, 4 May – c. 15 November 1945
- Camp Shanks, New York, 7 – 8 December 1945
- Army Air Forces Station Neubiberg, Germany, 20 August 1946
- Army Air Forces Station Bad Kissingen, Germany, July – 25 August 1947
- Andrews Field, Maryland, 25 August 1947
- Roswell Army Air Field (later Walker Air Force Base), New Mexico, 16 September 1947
- Otis Air Force Base, Massachusetts, 16 November 1948 – 6 February 1952
- Otis Air Force Base, Massachusetts, 18 August 1955 – 18 August 1957
- Tan Son Nhut Air Base, South Vietnam, 8 July 1963 – 8 July 1965
- Eglin Air Force Base, Florida, 1 December 1991 – present

=== Awards and campaigns ===
Award streamer	Award	Dates	Notes
	Distinguished Unit Citation	15 January 1943	33d Fighter Group, Central Tunisia
	Air Force Outstanding Unit Award	2 December 1991 – 31 March 1992	33d Operations Group
	Air Force Outstanding Unit Award	1 June 1996 – 31 May 1998	33d Operations Group
	Air Force Outstanding Unit Award	1 June 1998 – 31 May 1999	33d Operations Group

Campaign/Service Streamer	Campaign	Dates	Notes
	American Theater without inscription	7 December 1941 – October 1942	33d Pursuit Group (later 33d Fighter Group)
	Algeria-French Morocco	10 November 1942 – 11 November 1942	33d Fighter Group
	Tunisia	12 November 1942 – 13 May 1943	33d Fighter Group
	Sicily	14 May 1943 – 17 August 1943	33d Fighter Group
	Naples-Foggia	18 August 1943 – 21 January 1944	33d Fighter Group
	Anzio	22 January 1944 – February 1944	33d Fighter Group
	Rome-Arno	22 January 1944 – February 1944	33d Fighter Group
	Air Combat, EAME Theater	10 November 1942 – February 1944	33d Fighter Group
	India-Burma	20 February 1944 – 28 January 1945	33d Fighter Group
	Central Burma	29 January 1945 – 15 July 1945	33d Fighter Group
	China Defensive	4 July 1942 – 4 May 1945	33d Fighter Group
	Vietnam Advisory	8 July 1963 – 1 March 1965	33d Tactical Group
	Vietnam Defensive	2 March 1965 – 8 July 1965	33d Tactical Group
	World War II Army of Occupation (Germany)	20 August 1946 – July 1947	33d Fighter Group

=== Aircraft ===
- Bell P-39 Airacobra (1941)
- Curtiss P-40 Warhawk (1941–1944)
- Lockheed P-38 Lightning (1944–1945)
- Republic P-47 Thunderbolt (1944–1948)
- North American P-51D Mustang (1948–1950)
- Republic F-84C Thunderjet (1948–1950)
- North American F-86A Sabre (1950–1952)
- Lockheed F-94 Starfire (1951–1952, 1956–1957)
- Northrop F-89C Scorpion (1956–1957)
- McDonnell Douglas F-15C Eagle (1991–2009)
- McDonnell Douglas F-15D Eagle (1991–2009)
- General Dynamics F-16 Fighting Falcon (2011)
- Lockheed Martin F-35 Lightning II (2011–present)
