= Pungchacheng Airfield =

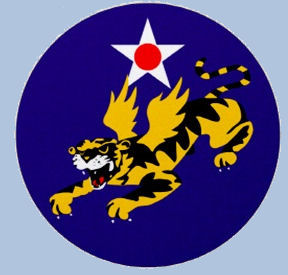
Pungchacheng Airfield
- Part of Fourteenth Air Force
- Zhejiang Province, China

Site information
- Type: Military airfield
- Controlled by: United States Army Air Forces

Location
- Coordinates: 28°58′08″N 118°27′25″E (Approximate)

Site history
- Battles/wars: China Defensive Campaign 1942-1945

Pungchacheng Airfield is a former World War II United States Army Air Forces airfield in China, located approximately 25 miles west of Quzhou (Zhejiang Province) in China.

== History ==
The airfield was the home of the 33d Fighter Group, which operated P-40 Warhawks and later P-47 Thunderbolt fighter-bombers from the airfield during the summer of 1944. In late August, the 311th Fighter Group was reassigned from Tenth Air Force in Burma to Pungchacheng with P-51 Mustangs, remaining at the base until the end of the war in September 1945. The fighters supported the Chinese ground forces against the Japanese, attacking the enemy's communications, and supported ground operations. Later, the P-51s flew escort missions of B-24 and B-25 bombers, as well as interceptor missions against enemy aircraft from the field.

The Americans closed their facilities at the end of 1945 and the airfield was turned over to local authorities. Today, the area where it existed during the war has since been developed into an industrial area. The airfield appears to have been developed into an airport after the war, as the remains of a large parking area and what appears to be two runways, aligned 16/34 and 02/20 are visible in aerial photography. The runways today appear to be roads in the industrial area, the large parking ramp being the foundation of several large buildings and storage tanks.
