= Berteaux Airfield =

Abandoned military airfield in Algeria

Berteaux Airfield
- Part of Twelfth Air Force
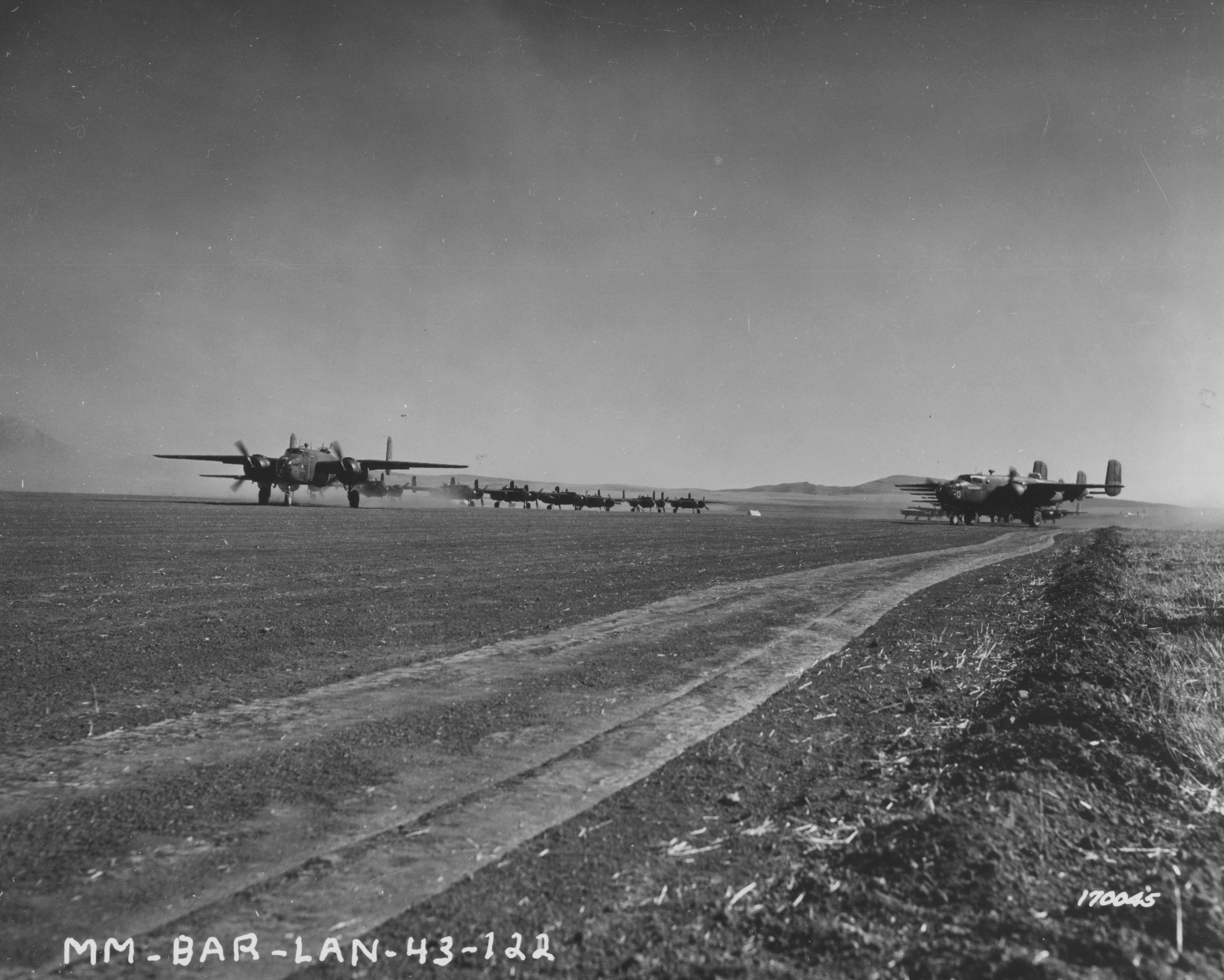

Site information
- Type: Military Airfield
- Controlled by: United States Army Air Forces

Location
- Coordinates: 36°04′40″N 006°29′15″E

Site history
- Built: 1942
- In use: December 1942-March 1944

Location of Berteaux Airfield, Algeria

Berteaux Airfield is an abandoned World War II United States Army Air Forces military airfield in Algeria, which was located approximately 9 km east of Telerghma; 35 km southwest of Constantine.

The airfield was constructed as a semi-permanent facility in late 1942 and early 1943, with a hard asphalt runway and concrete taxiways. Numerous hardstands were built, as well as a pierced steel planking parking apron and a steel control tower. There were probably a few structures erected with at least one blister-type hangar. A mixture of medium bomber and fighter groups and squadrons from Twelfth Air Force used the airfield during the North African Campaign.

== History ==
The first operational unit to use Berteaux was the 310th Bombardment Group and its 379th, 380th, 381st and 428th Squadrons, flying B-25 Mitchells. Elements of the group arrived in late December 1942 from Telergma Airfield, with Group HQ arriving on 1 January 1943. The group engaged primarily in support and interdictory operations against German forces in Algeria and Tunisia. Almost simultaneously, the 14th Fighter Group with its P-38 Lightning equipped 48th, 49th and 50th Squadrons on 9 January. The 14th flew escort for the B-25s as well as engaging in strafing and reconnaissance missions until the beginning of March when it moved to Mediouna Airfield outside Casablanca.

The 14th was replaced by the P-40 Warhawk equipped 33d Fighter Group in early March, and the P-38 Lightning equipped 82d Fighter Group at the end of March. The 58th, 59th and 60th squadrons of the 33d, as well as the 95th, 96th and 97th squadrons of the 82d meant the airfield was home to over 100 fighter and bomber aircraft. Also the support facilities were hard pressed to handle the large numbers of ground support personnel, all billeted in tents.

The 33d Fighter Group moved out to Ebba Ksour Airfield, Tunisia, in the middle of April, reducing the crowded conditions somewhat, with the 82d and 310th Bomb Groups moving east in June as the battle of North Africa moved into Tunisia.

Berteaux Airfield was used as a support base for transient aircraft for a few months until the 68th Reconnaissance Group moved its P-38 and P-51 reconnaissance aircraft to the airfield in early September. The group flew combat reconnaissance missions over Tunisia and Sicily until October 1943 when it also moved east to Massicault Airfield in Tunisia, the North African Campaign ended and the combat moving to Italy. Along with the Recon squadrons, the 1st, 2d, and 3d Fighter Training Squadron provided P-40 Warhawk and P-38 Lightning training to French pilots and the 122d Liaison Squadron flew courier and observation operations.

Other units assigned to Berteaux were the Air Technical Service Command 318th and 359th Service Squadrons which supported and maintained the aircraft assigned to the field.

After the 68th moved out in October, Berteaux stayed in service as an Air Technical Service Command supply and maintenance support airfield until the end of March, 1944. Afterward, what could be dismantled from the airfield was moved east and the airfield was turned over to local authorities.

Today the area where Berteaux Airfield was constructed is now an agricultural area, although the ground still shows evidence of its existence in aerial images.
