= USS Chenango (CVE-28) =

Escort carriers of the United States Navy

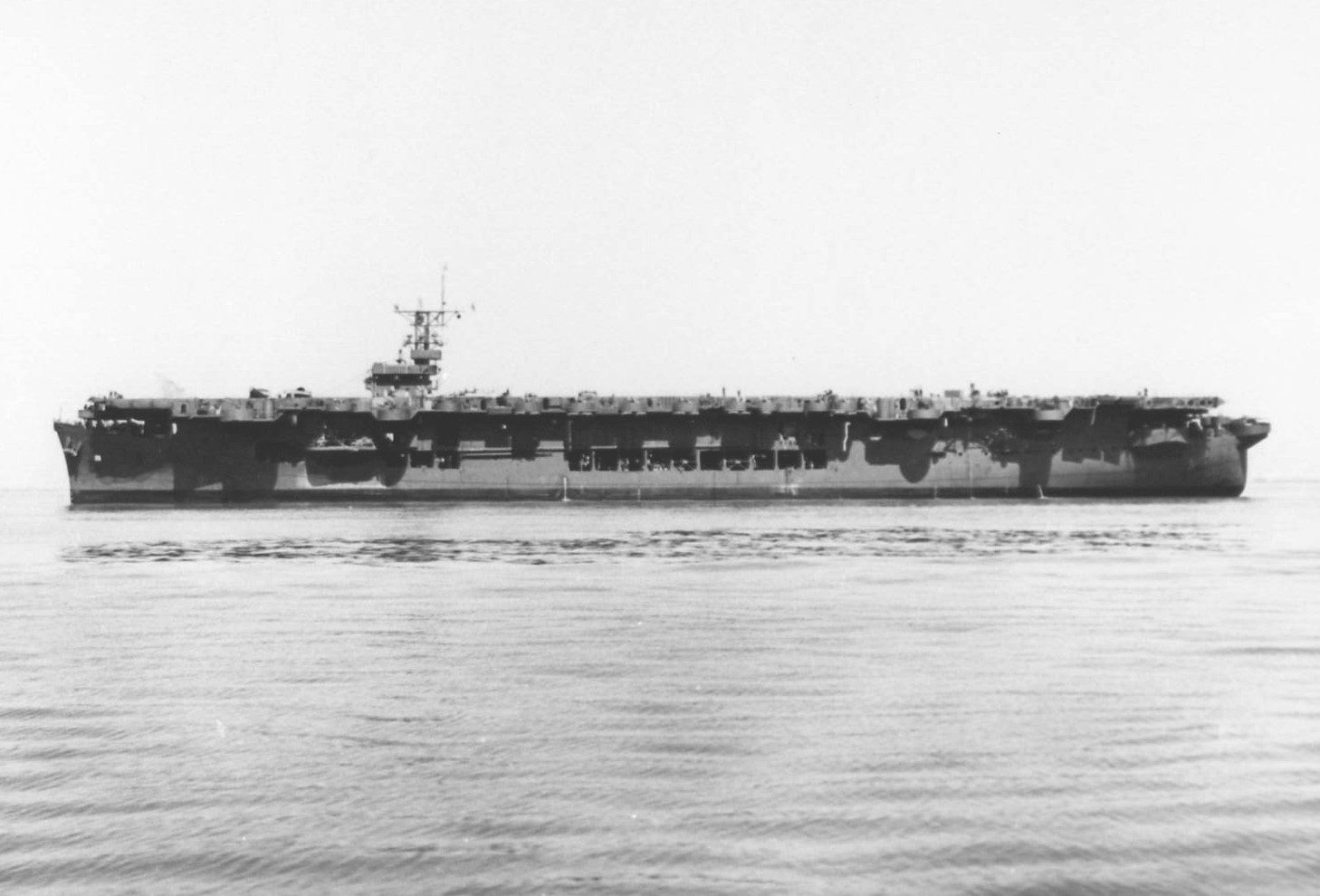
- Broadside view of USS Chenango (CVE-28) off Mare Island Navy Yard, on 22 Sep 1943.

History
- Name: Esso New Orleans
- Owner: Standard Oil Company
- Ordered: as type (T2-S2-A1) hull, MCE hull 4
- Awarded: 3 January 1938
- Builder: Sun Shipbuilding and Dry Dock Company, Chester, Pennsylvania
- Cost: $880,516.70
- Laid down: 10 July 1938
- Launched: 1 April 1939
- Sponsored by: Mrs. Monroe Jackson Rathbone
- Fate: Sold to US Navy, 31 May 1941

United States
- Name: Chenango
- Namesake: Chenango River, in New York
- Acquired: 31 May 1941
- Commissioned: 20 June 1941
- Decommissioned: 16 March 1942
- Identification: Hull symbol: AO-31; Callsign: NFBK
- Recommissioned: 19 September 1942, as ACV-28
- Decommissioned: 14 August 1946
- Refit: Bethlehem Staten Island, New York
- Stricken: 1 March 1959
- Identification: Hull symbol: AVG-28 (16 March 1942); ACV-28 (20 August 1942); CVE-28 (15 July 1943); CVHE-28 (12 June 1955); Callsign: NWSD
- Fate: Sold for scrapping, 12 February 1960

General characteristics as fleet oiler
- Class & type: Cimarron-class oiler
- Displacement: 7,470 long tons (7,590 t) light; 25,425 long tons (25,833 t) full load
- Length: 525 ft (160 m) wl
- Beam: 75 feet (23 m)
- Draft: 32 ft 3 in (9.83 m)
- Installed power: 4 × Babcock & Wilcox steam boilers (450 psi (3,100 kPa)); 13,500 shp (10,100 kW)
- Propulsion: 2 × Westinghouse geared steam turbines; 2 × shafts
- Speed: 18.3 kn (33.9 km/h; 21.1 mph)
- Capacity: 122,400 bbl (19,460 m^{3}) of oil; 805,000 US gal (3,050,000 L; 670,000 imp gal) of gasoline
- Complement: 301 officers and men
- Armament: 4 × single 5 in (130 mm)/51 cal guns]; 4 × twin Bofors 40 mm (1.6 in) anti-aircraft guns; 4 × twin Oerlikon 20 mm (0.79 in) anti-aircraft cannons

General characteristics as escort carrier
- Class & type: Sangamon-class escort carrier
- Displacement: 11,400 long tons (11,583 t) standard; 24,275 long tons (24,665 t) full
- Length: 553 ft 6 in (168.71 m) oa; 503 ft (153 m) flight deck
- Beam: 105 ft (32 m) flight deck
- Draft: 30 ft 7 in (9.32 m)
- Range: 23,920 nmi (44,300 km; 27,530 mi) at 15 kn (28 km/h; 17 mph)
- Complement: 830 officers and men
- Armament: 2 × 5"/51 caliber guns; 4 × twin Bofors 40 mm L/60 anti-aircraft guns; 12 × single Oerlikon 20 mm cannons
- Aircraft carried: 25
- Aviation facilities: 1 × hydraulic catapult; 2 × elevators

General characteristics 1945
- Complement: 1,080 officers and men
- Armament: 2 × quad Bofors 40 mm L/60 anti-aircraft guns; 10 × twin Bofors 40 mm L/60 anti-aircraft guns; 19 × single Oerlikon 20 mm cannons
- Aircraft carried: 32
- Aviation facilities: 2 × hydraulic catapults

Service record
- Operations: World War II
- Awards: 11 battle stars; Navy Unit Commendation

USS Chenango (AVG/ACV/CVE/CVEH-28), was a US Navy escort carrier of World War II. Originally built as Esso New Orleans, one of twelve tankers built by a joint Navy-Maritime Commission design. This design was later duplicated and designated a T3-S2-A1 oiler. She was acquired by the Navy in May 1940, and renamed and classified Chenango (AO-31), for use as a Cimarron-class fleet oiler. In 1942, she was converted into one of four Sangamon-class escort carriers. Originally classified as an "Aircraft Escort Vessel", and designated AVG-28, in March 1942, she was reclassified as an "Auxiliary Aircraft Carrier", ACV-28, in August 1942. When the US Navy had another major reclassification on 15 July 1943, Sangamon was again reclassified, this time as an "Escort Carrier", CVE-28. After the war, she was later classified an "Escort Helicopter Aircraft Carrier" and again redesignated, CVHE-28, 12 June 1955. She was named after the Chenango River, in New York.

== Construction ==
Esso New Orleans was laid down on 10 July 1938, by the Sun Shipbuilding and Dry Dock Company, in Cheaster, Pennsylvania, MC hull 5. She was launched on 1 April 1939; she was sponsored by Mrs. Monroe Jackson Rathbone, the wife of the president of Standard Oil Company of Louisiana.

== Service history ==
Esso New Orleans was acquired by the United States Navy on 31 May 1941. She was renamed and classified Chenango (AO-31), one of 35 Cimarron-class fleet oilers. She was commissioned on 20 June 1941.

=== Fleet oiler service ===
Assigned to the Naval Transportation Service (NTS), Chenango steamed in the Atlantic, the Caribbean, and the Pacific, as far as Honolulu, on replenishment duty.

The Battle of the Atlantic heated up as the Germans launched Operation Neuland with simultaneous attacks on Dutch and Venezuelan oil ports in the Caribbean to disrupt production and flow of petroleum products vital to the Allied war effort. Chenango was present at Aruba, on 16 February 1942, when U-156 attempted to shell one of the island's refineries. The enemy torpedoed and damaged the US tanker SS Arkansas as she lay alongside Eagle Dock; but a second torpedo missed the ship and ran up on the beach. Arkansas did not report casualties among her 37-man crew. The Germans did not emerge from the action unscathed however, for the explosion of a shell prematurely in the gun barrel, because the tampion was not removed, mortally wounded one and critically wounded another of the crew on board U-156. She received permission to put in to Vichy French held Martinique, on 21 February, to put ashore the crewman who had survived the explosion; he was put into captivity.

=== Conversion to escort carrier ===
Chenango was decommissioned at the Brooklyn Navy Yard, on 16 March 1942, for conversion to an auxiliary aircraft carrier. She was converted at Bethlehem Staten Island, New York, and recommissioned as Chenango (ACV-28) on 19 September 1942.

=== Escort carrier service ===
==== 1942 ====
Carrying 77 P-40 Warhawks of the 33rd Fighter Group of the United States Army Air Forces, Chenango sailed on 23 October, with the Torch assault force bound for North Africa. On 10 November, she flew off her aircraft to the newly won Port Lyautey, French Morocco. She put into Casablanca, on 13 November, to refuel 21 destroyers before returning to Norfolk, Virginia, on 30 November, battling through a storm en route which caused extensive damage.

==== 1943 ====
Quickly repaired, Chenango was underway for the Pacific by mid-December 1942. Arriving at Nouméa on 18 January 1943, with eleven Grumman F4F-4 Wildcats of Escort-Fighter Squadron VGF-28, and eight Douglas SBD-3 Dauntlesses and nine Grumman TBF-1 Avengers, of Escort-Scouting Squadron VGS-28 on board. She joined the escort carrier group providing air cover for supply convoys supporting the invasion and occupation of the Solomon Islands. One of her air groups was sent to Henderson Field, Guadalcanal, to give close support to the US Marine Corps forces ashore. One of Chenango's duties during this period was to stand sentry off the fiercely contested island. As part of her Solomons operations, Chenango's planes formed an air umbrella to escort to safety St. Louis and Honolulu after the cruisers were damaged in the Battle of Kolombangara, on 13 July. Reclassified CVE-28 on 15 July, Chenango returned to the Mare Island Navy Yard, on 18 August, for an overhaul. She then acted as training carrier for new air groups until 19 October. She steamed from San Diego, to join the Gilbert Islands invasion force at Espiritu Santo, on 5 November. During the invasion of Tarawa from 20 November-8 December, her planes covered the advance of the attack force, bombed and strafed beaches ahead of the invading troops, and protected off-shore convoys. On 29 November 1943, at 21:57, her Avenger TBFs, of Air Group 35, found and sank a Type B1 submarine, likely Japanese submarine I-21. She returned to San Diego for another period of training duty.

==== 1944 ====
Steaming from San Diego, on 13 January 1944, Chenango supported the invasion landings on Roi, Kwajalein, and Eniwetok, in the Marshalls operation. After protecting the service group refueling fleet units engaged in the Palau strikes, Chenango arrived at Espiritu Santo, on 7 April. She sortied for the landings at Aitape and Hollandia, now Jayapura, from 16 April–12 May, then joined Task Group 53.7 (TG 53.7), for the invasion of the Marianas. Her planes struck airfield installations, sank enemy shipping, and attacked harbor facilities on Pagan Island, as well as conducting valuable photographic reconnaissance of Guam. From 8 July, she joined in daily strikes on Guam, preparing for the island's invasion. She returned to Manus, on 13 August, to replenish and conduct training.

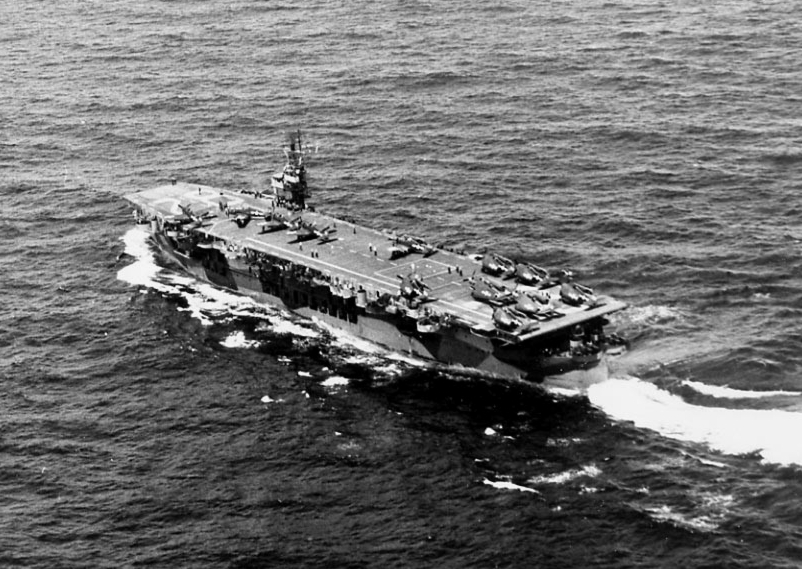
USS Chenango underway in 1944.

From 10 to 29 September, Chenango joined in the neutralization of enemy airfields in the Halmaheras in support of the invasion of Morotai, stepping-stone to the Philippines. After preparations at Manus, Chenango cleared on 12 October, to conduct softening up strikes on Leyte, in preparation for the invasion landings on 20 October. Chenango and her sister ship Sangamon were attacked by three Japanese planes on the afternoon of D-Day, and shot down all three, capturing one of the pilots. Sailing to Morotai, to load new aircraft, Chenango was not in action waters during the Battle of Leyte Gulf, but returned on 28 October, to provide replacement aircraft to her victorious sister escort carriers, who had held the Japanese fleet off from Leyte. The next day, she sailed for overhaul at Seattle, Washington, until 9 February 1945.

==== 1945 ====
After the overhaul period, she again sailed west, arriving at Tulagi, in the Solomons, on 4 March. Chenango conducted training, then sortied from Ulithi, on 27 March, for the invasion of Okinawa. She gave air cover in the feint landings on the southern tip of the island, then was assigned to neutralize the kamikaze bases in Sakashima Gunto. On 9 April, a fighter crashed upon landing and started a raging fire among the strike-loaded aircraft on Chenango's deck. Skillful work by her crew saved the ship from serious damage and she remained in action off Okinawa, until 11 June. After escorting a tanker convoy to San Pedro Bay, Chenango sailed on 26 July, to join the logistics force for the 3rd Fleet, then engaged in the final offensive against Japan.

=== Postwar service ===
Following the surrender of Japan, Chenango supported the occupation forces and evacuated some 1,900 Allied prisoners of war and 1,500 civilians from slave labor camps. She cleared Tokyo Bay, on 25 October, and after a brief overhaul at San Diego, returned to "Magic Carpet" duty, transporting veterans from Okinawa and Pearl Harbor, to the West Coast.

== Fate ==
Chenango sailed from San Pedro, on 5 February, for Boston, and was placed out of commission in reserve there on 14 August 1946. She was reclassified CVHE-28 on 12 June 1955. She was struck from the Naval Vessel Register on 1 March 1959, and sold and removed from naval custody on 12 February 1960.

== Awards ==
Chenango was awarded the Navy Unit Commendation and received 11 battle stars for her World War II service.

== Biography ==
- Yarnall, Paul (16 June 2025). "USS CHENANGO (ACV-28)". NavSource.
- "Chenango II (CVE-28)". 7 April 2020. This article incorporates text from this source, which is in the public domain.
- Hackett, Bob; Kingsepp, Sander. "IJN Submarine I-21".
