= Sahmaw =

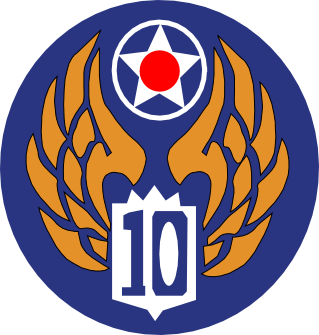
Sahmaw Airfield
- Part of Tenth Air Force
- Sahmaw, Burma

Site information
- Type: Military airfield
- Controlled by: United States Army Air Forces

Location
- Coordinates: 25°13′37″N 096°47′39″E (Approximate)

Site history
- Built: 1944
- In use: 1944-1945
- Battles/wars: Burma Campaign 1944-1945

Sahmaw is a town in Kachin State, Myanmar.

== Second World War ==
During the Burma Campaign 1944-1945 in the Second World War, Sahmaw was the site of a United States Army Air Forces airfield, now abandoned.

The airfield was a temporary combat airfield used by the 33d Fighter Group between 26 December 1944 and 4 May 1945, flying P-47 Thunderbolts and P-38 Lightnings. It was also used by the 71st Liaison Squadron, between 15 October and 16 January 1945, flying L-4 Piper Cubs and UC-64A Norseman light aircraft.

After the Americans moved out, the airfield was abandoned and was returned to agricultural use.

Sahmaw was a part of the Jeep Railway, a system of trains consisting of jeeps fitted with railway wheels and running on tracks, organized by the 36th Infantry Division of the British Army during the Burma Campaign.
