= Ebba Ksour Airfield =

Abandoned World War II military airfield in Tunisia

Ebba Ksour Airfield
- Part of Twelfth Air Force

Site information
- Type: Military airfield
- Controlled by: United States Army Air Forces

Location
- Coordinates: 35°57′53.86″N 008°49′06.48″E (Approximate)

Site history
- Built: 1942
- In use: 1942-1943

Location of Ebba Ksour Airfield, Tunisia

Ebba Ksour Airfield is an abandoned World War II military airfield in Tunisia, located near El Ksour, in Kef province, approximately 150 km South-West of Tunis.

The airfield was built as a temporary wartime field by Army Engineers, using Pierced Steel Planking (PSP) for runways and parking and dispersal areas, and support structures quickly constructed out of wood or tents. It was used briefly by the United States Army Air Forces Twelfth Air Force 33d Fighter Group between 12 April and 9 June 1943 during the North African Campaign flying P-40 Warhawks. After the 33d moved east to Menzel Temime, the airfield was dismantled by engineers.

The precise location of the airfield is undetermined. The land around El Ksour is a mixture of desert and agriculture and the land has largely either returned to its natural state or been developed into agriculture after the war. Today, there is little or no evidence remaining of the airfield's existence.
