= Sousse Airfield =

Abandoned military airfield in Tunisia

Sousse Airfield
- Part of Twelfth Air Force

Site information
- Type: Military airfield
- Controlled by: United States Army Air Forces

Location
- Coordinates: 35°49′38.86″N 010°37′55.15″E (Approximate)

Site history
- Built: 1943
- In use: 1943

Location of Sousse Airfield, Tunisia

Sousse Airfield is an abandoned World War II military airfield in Tunisia, which was located in the vicinity of Sousse. It was a temporary airfield used by the United States Army Air Forces Twelfth Air Force 31st Fighter Group which flew two squadrons of Supermarine Spitfires from the field between 9 and 19 June 1943

When the Americans pulled out, the airfield was abandoned. There is no evidence left of its existence in aerial photography of the area.
