= Santa Maria Airfield =

Abandoned Italian airfield

Santa Maria Airfield
- Part of Twelfth Air Force

Site information
- Type: Military airfield
- Controlled by: United States Army Air Forces

Location
- Coordinates: 40°50′17.25″N 014°20′57.77″E

Site history
- Built: 1943
- In use: 1943-1944

Location of Santa Maria Airfield, Italy

Santa Maria Airfield is an abandoned World War II military airfield in Italy, located in the Vecchia Parrocchia di Santa Maria Del Carmine city of San Giorgio a Cremano, about 23 km southeast from the main Naples Airport.

It was an all-weather temporary field built by the XII Engineer Command using a graded earth compacted surface, with a prefabricated hessian (burlap) surfacing known as PHS. PHS was made of an asphalt-impregnated jute which was rolled out over the compacted surface over a square mesh track (SMT) grid of wire joined in 3-inch squares. Pierced Steel Planking was also used for parking areas, as well as for dispersal sites, when it was available. In addition, tents were used for billeting and also for support facilities; an access road was built to the existing road infrastructure; a dump for supplies, ammunition, and gasoline drums, along with a drinkable water and minimal electrical grid for communications and station lighting.

Once completed it was turned over for use by Twelfth Air Force during the Italian Campaign. Known units assigned were:

- 27th Fighter Group, 8 May-7 June 1944, P-47 Thunderbolt
- 33d Fighter Group, 18 November 1943-1 January 1944, P-40 Warhawk

There are no remaining traces of the airfield as the urban growth of the Cappella Santa Maria Del Carmine area of Naples has expanded over the area, and obliterated any trace of the airfield. It is unknown precisely where the airfield was actually located due to the changed landscape over the past 60 years.
