= Telergma Airport =

Telerghma Airport
- IATA: none; ICAO: DAAM

Summary
- Airport type: Public
- Serves: Telerghma
- Location: Algeria
- Elevation AMSL: 2,484 ft (757 m)
- Coordinates: 36°6′30″N 6°21′50″E

Map
- Location of Telerghma Airport in Algeria

Runways
Direction	Length		Surface
Direction	m	ft	Surface
08/26	2,200	7,220	Asphalt
- Source: World Aero Data Landings.com Google Maps

Telerghma Airport is a joint-use civilian/military airport in Algeria (ICAO: DAAM), just south of the city of Telerghma, about 300 km east of Algiers.

== History ==
Built by the French Colonial government prior to World War II, the small airport was seized by American Forces in the initial aftermath of the Operation Torch landings on 2 December 1942. By 13 December, French troops and United States Army Engineers had improved the runway sufficiently for 17th Bombardment Group Martin B-26 Marauder medium bombers to begin using the facility, now known as "Telerghma Airfield." Major Twelfth Air Force units assigned to the airfield during the North African Campaign were:

- 17th Bombardment Group, 13 December 1942 – 10 May 1943, Martin B-26 Marauder
- 310th Bombardment Group, 21 December 1942 – 1 January 1943, North American B-25 Mitchell
- 319th Bombardment Group, 12 December 1942 – 3 March 1943, B-26 Marauder
- 14th Fighter Group, 5 May-13 June 1943, Lockheed P-38 Lightning
- 33d Fighter Group, 24 December 1942 – 7 January 1943; 20 February-2 March 1943, Curtiss P-40 Warhawk
- 52d Fighter Group, 17 January-9 March 1943, Supermarine Spitfire
- 82d Fighter Group, January-28 March 1943, P-38 Lightning

After the Battle of North Africa ended, Telerghma Airfield was converted into a Bombardment Training Center, used to instruct French Air Force ground and bomber crews in safe and effective tactical operation and maintenance of American fighter and bomber aircraft. The training center closed at the end of October 1944, and the airfield was returned to civil authorities.
