= Menzel Temime Airfield =

Abandoned World War II airfield in Tunisia

Menzel Temime Airfield
- Part of Twelfth Air Force

Site information
- Type: Military airfield
- Controlled by: United States Army Air Forces

Location
- Coordinates: 36°46′53.43″N 010°59′14.71″E (Approximate)

Site history
- Built: 1943
- In use: 1943

Location of Menzel Temime Airfield, Tunisia

Menzel Temime Airfield is an abandoned military airfield in Tunisia, which was located near the city of Menzel Temine, 25 km north-northeast of Korba and 31 km east of Tāklisah. The airfield was built as a temporary wartime field by Army Engineers, using Pierced Steel Planking (PSP) for runways and parking and dispersal areas, and support structures quickly constructed out of wood or tents.

During World War II it was used by the United States Army Air Force Twelfth Air Force during the North African Campaign. B-25 Mitchells flown from the airfield later took part in the Sicilian and Italian Campaigns, flying combat missions until enemy targets became out of range. Known units which used the airfield were:

- 310th Bombardment Group, 5 August-10 November 1943, B-25 Mitchell
- 33d Fighter Group, 20 May-9 June 1943, P-40 Warhawk

The airfield was closed by the Americans in December 1943, and dismantled by Army engineers. Today, its precise location is undetermined. The land around Menzel Temine is heavily used in agriculture, leaving is little or no evidence remaining of the airfield's existence after 60 years.
