= 92nd Cyberspace Operations Squadron =

92d Cyberspace Operations Squadron
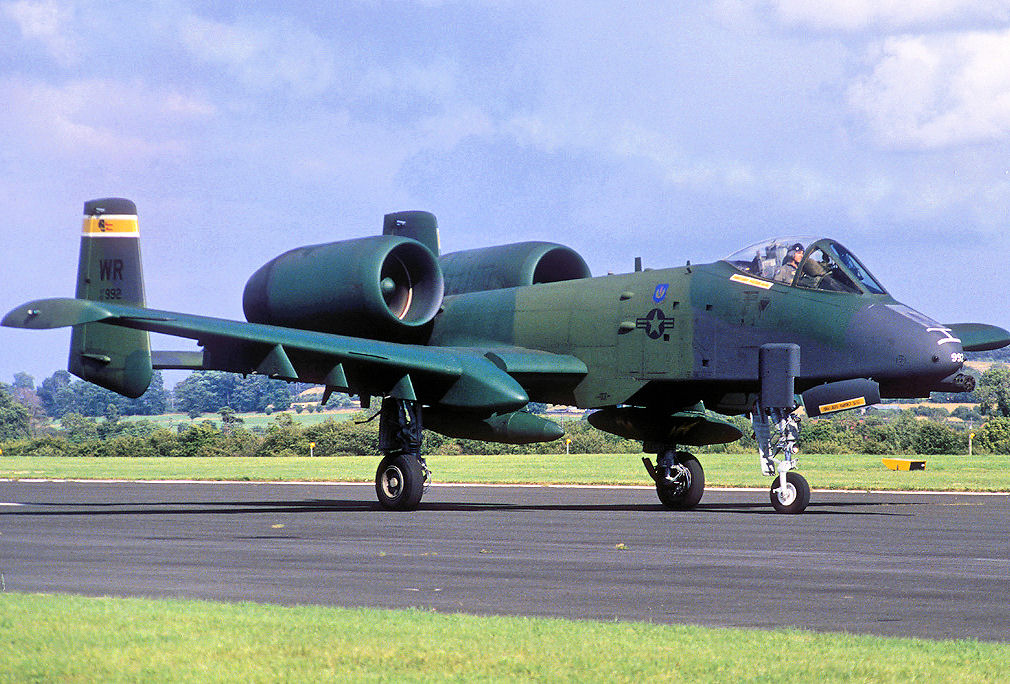
- Squadron A-10A Thunderbolt II at RAF Bentwaters (Note: Aircraft is A-10A serial 81-992.)
- Active: 1942–1945; 1946–1993; 2000–present
- Country: United States
- Branch: United States Air Force
- Role: Information Warfare
- Size: Approximately 200 personnel
- Nickname(s): Skulls
- Engagements: Mediterranean Theater of Operations; China-Burma-India Theater
- Decorations: Air Force Outstanding Unit Award; Air Force Organizational Excellence Award

Insignia
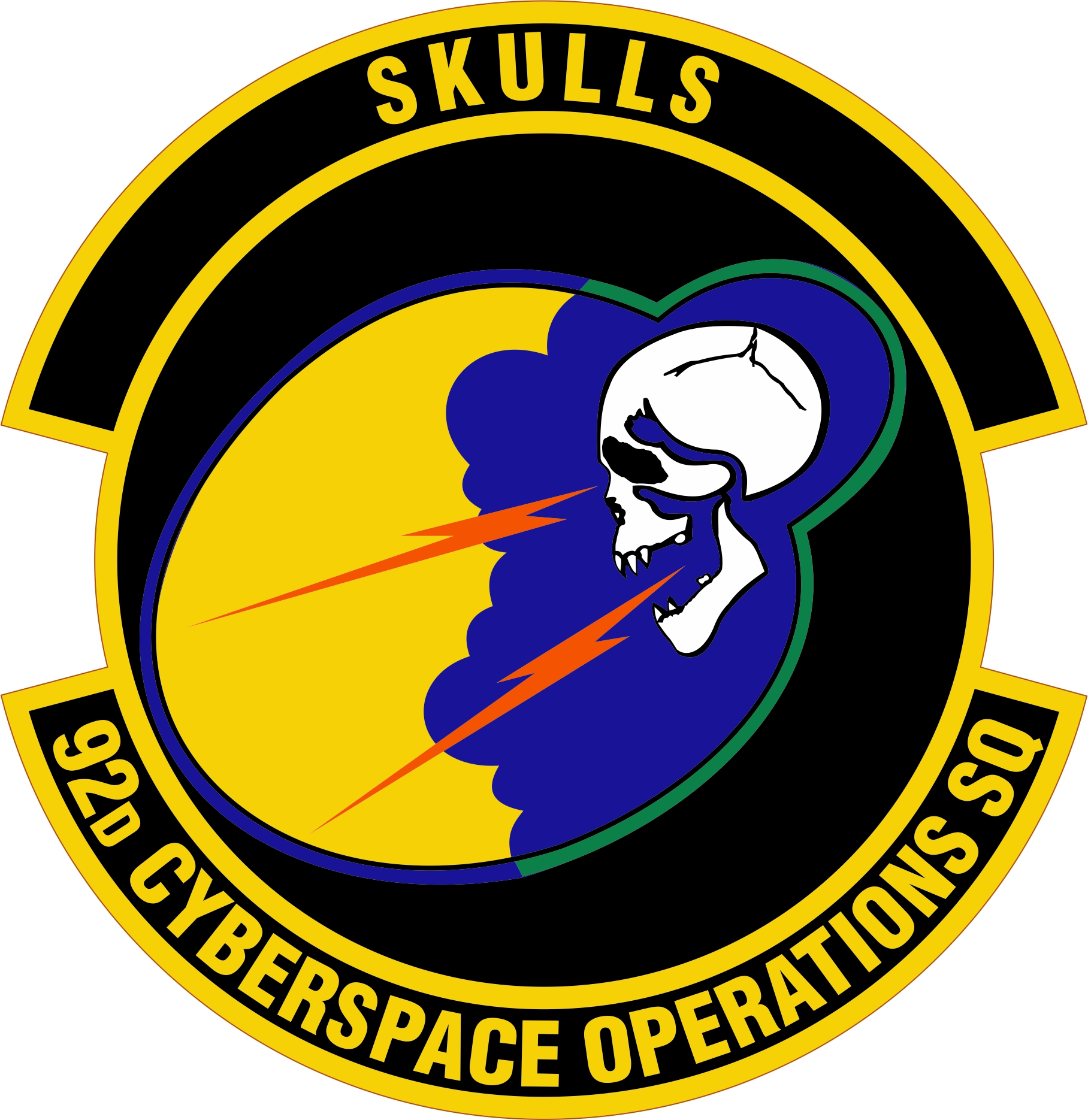
- 92d Cyberspace Operations Sq emblem (approved 30 October 2015)

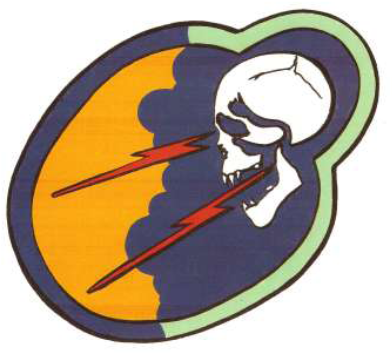
- 92d Fighter Squadron emblem (approved 30 June 1945)

The 92d Cyberspace Operations Squadron is a United States Air Force unit.

It was formerly a fighter unit. Its last assignment as a fighter unit was with the 81st Tactical Fighter Wing at RAF Bentwaters, England, where it was inactivated on 31 March 1993.

== Mission ==
The unit is made up of 60 active duty military, 65 civilians and 95 contractor personnel. Its mission is to assure Air Force and United States Department of Defense mission performance by employing cyberspace protection teams and performing cyberspace vulnerability assessments and communications security assessments. It is one of only two Air Force units performing cyberspace vulnerability assessments

== History ==
=== World War II ===
The squadron was activated in early 1942 under III Fighter Command in North Carolina. Initially trained with Bell P-39 Airacobras, re-equipped with Lockheed P-38 Lightnings.

Moved overseas, October 1942 – February 1943, the ground echelon arriving in French Morocco with the force that invaded North Africa on 8 November, and the air echelon, which had trained for a time in England, arriving in North Africa between late December 1942 and early February 1943.

Began combat with Twelfth Air Force in January 1943. Supported ground operations during the Allied drive against Axis forces in Tunisia. Patrolled the coast of North Africa and protected Allied shipping in the Mediterranean Sea, April–July 1943. Provided cover for the convoys that landed troops on Pantelleria on 11 June and on Sicily on 10 July 1943. Supported the landings at Anzio on 22 January 1944 and flew patrols in that area for a short time.

Transferred to the China-Burma-India Theater and moved to India, February–March 1944. Initially performed training with Curtiss P-40 Warhawk and Republic P-47 Thunderbolt aircraft. Moved to China in May and became part of Fourteenth Air Force. Continued training and on occasion flew patrol and escort missions before returning to full-time combat duty in January 1945. Attacked enemy airfields and installations, flew escort missions, and aided the operations of Chinese ground forces by attacking troop concentrations, ammunition dumps, lines of communications, and other targets to hinder Japanese efforts to move men and materiel to the front.

Inactivated in China on 27 December 1945.

=== Cold War ===
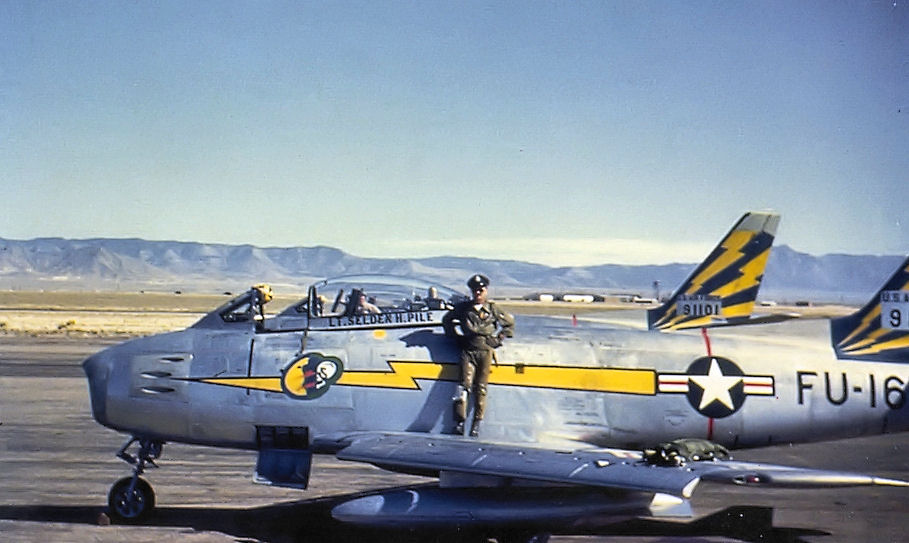
92d FS F-86A 49-1161

Reactivated at Wheeler Field, Hawaii in late 1946. Equipped with North American P-51 Mustangs and performed air defence of the Hawaiian Islands until 1949. Was reassigned to Continental Air Command Ninth Air Force, being stationed in New Mexico. Re-equipped with Lockheed F-80 Shooting Star jet aircraft, trained as a tactical fighter squadron. Upgraded to North American F-86 Sabres in 1950.

Reassigned to Air Defense Command, becoming part of the Western Air Defense Force, being moved to Moses Lake Air Force Base, Washington. In Washington the squadron's mission was the air defence of eastern Washington, including the Grand Coulee Dam and the Hanford Nuclear Reservation.

==== United States Air Forces in Europe ====
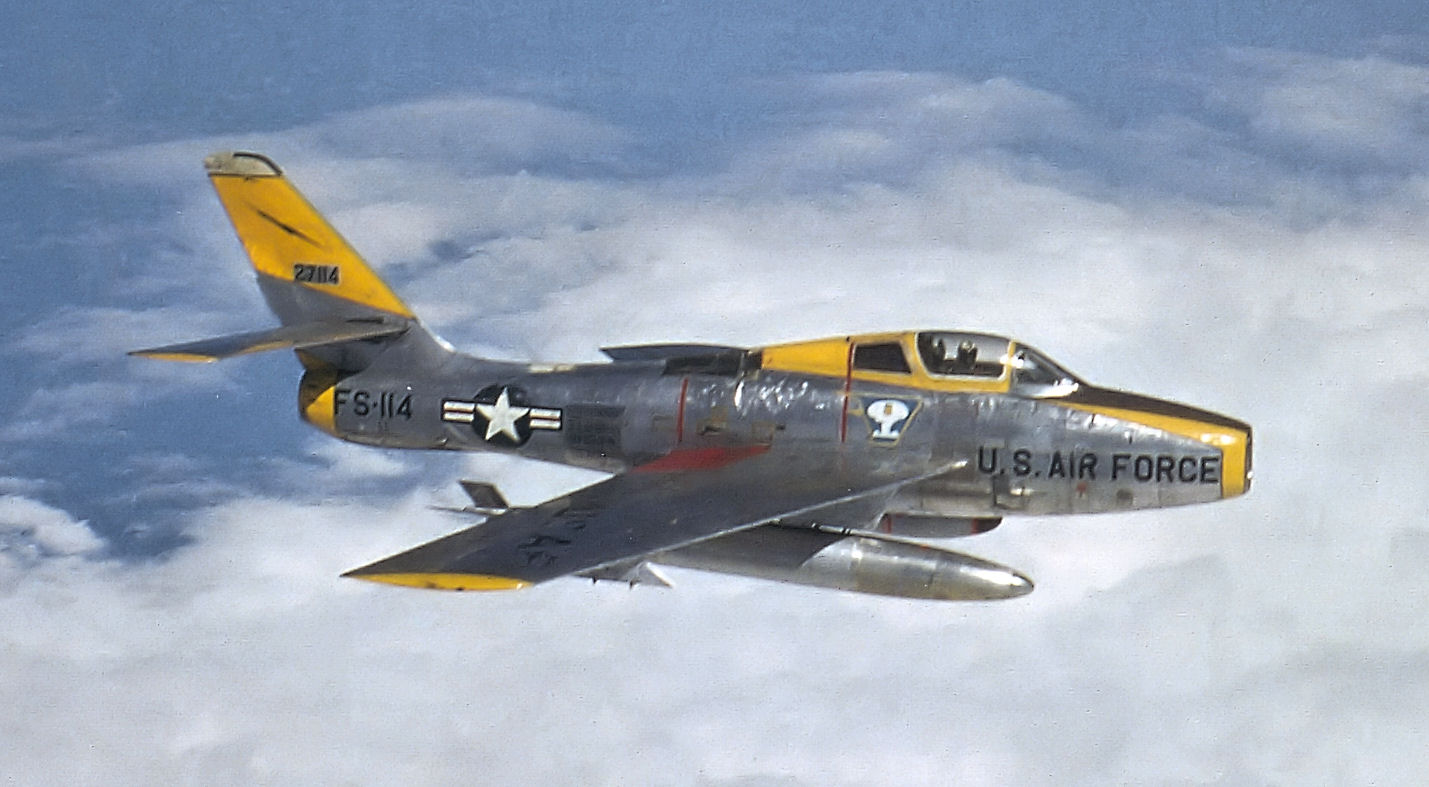
92d TFS F-84F Thunderstreak 52-7114

Ordered to the United Kingdom in 1951, mission to assist the Royal Air Force in the Air Defense of East Anglia, being assigned to the newly refurbished RAF Bentwaters. Also operated from a dispersed station, RAF Shepherds Grove about forty miles apart.

The squadron was one of the first Sabre Jet unit to be based in Europe, and the first to form an integral part of the peacetime air defense of Great Britain. In this role, the squadron came under the operational control of the RAF Fighter Command No. 11 Group during the actual defense of the United Kingdom, and for combined operational training. Under USAFE, the squadron came under the control of Third Air Force which coordinated its activities with the RAF.

In October 1954 the mission of the squadron changed from fighter-interceptor to fighter-bomber operations, carrying both conventional and nuclear weapons. The squadron was charged with tactical operations in support of USAFE and NATO, with air defence as a secondary mission. To reflect this change, the unit traded in its F-86s for the F-84F Thunderstreak.

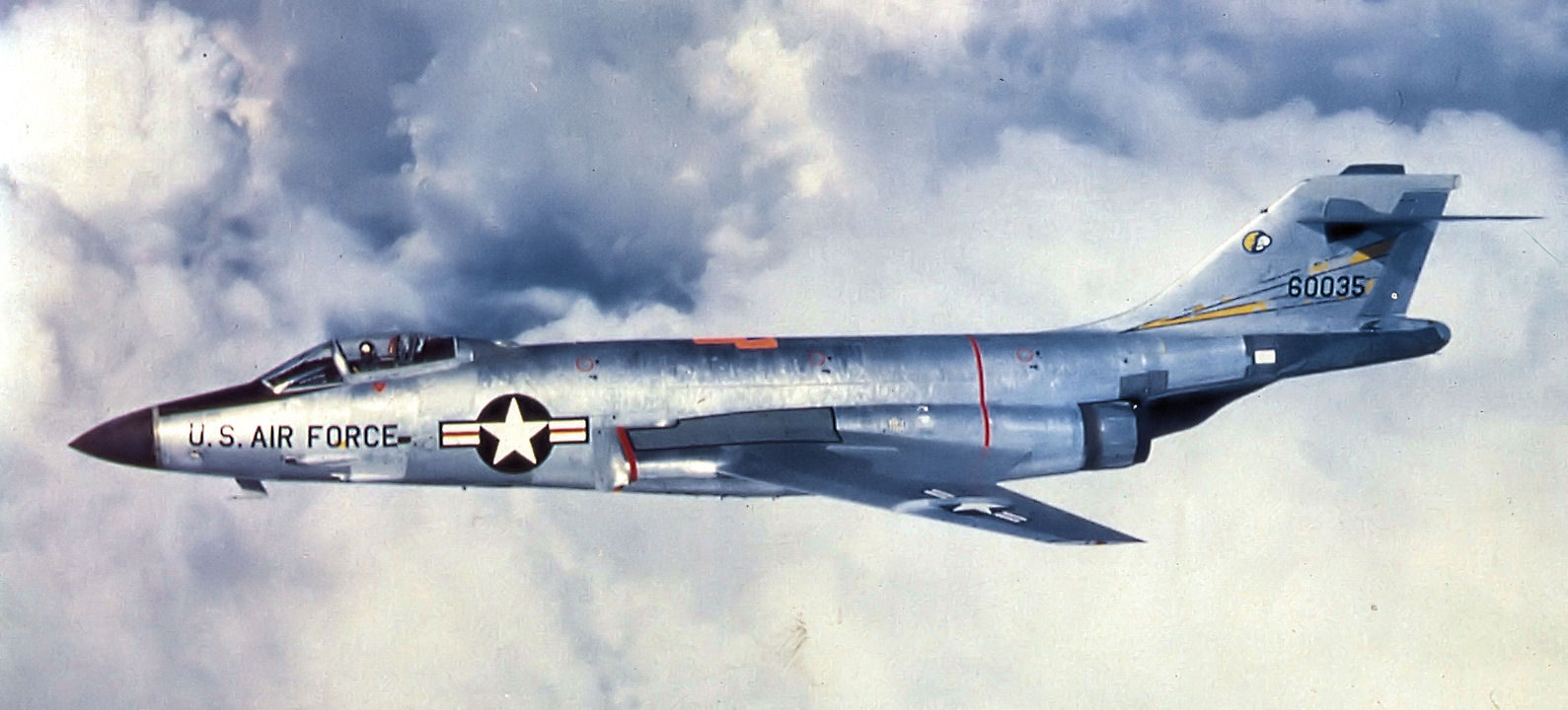
92d TFS F-101C Voodoo 56-035

Beginning in the fall of 1958, the squadron was re-equipped with the McDonnell F-101 Voodoo. The F-101 was configured as a fighter bomber, intended to carry a single nuclear weapon for use against battlefield targets such as airfields. The Voodos were equipped with Low Angle Drogued Delivery and Low Altitude Bombing System equipment for its primary mission of delivering nuclear weapons at extremely low altitudes. Pilots were trained for one-way missions into Soviet territory to increase effective range at some cost in negating pilot recovery.

In November 1965, the squadron received McDonnell F-4 Phantom II to replace the Voodoos. Initially receiving the F-4C this was later upgraded to the more capable F-4D during late 1972 and 1973. Began conversion to the Fairchild Republic A-10 Thunderbolt II in June 1979. The A-10 being a single-seat, twin-engine jet aircraft designed to provide close air support of ground forces by attacking tanks, armored vehicles, and other ground targets. With the A-10, the squadron's mission changed to close air support and battlefield air interdiction in support of NATO ground forces.

With the end of the Cold War in 1991, the USAF presence at Bentwaters was gradually phased down. It was announced that the base would be closed and the squadron would be inactivated. The squadron was inactivated on 31 March 1993.

=== Information warfare ===
The squadron became the 92d Information Warfare Aggressor Squadron and was activated at Kelly Air Force Base, Texas in November 2000. The squadron also has a detachment located at Scott Air Force Base, Illinois.

The unit operates the Cyberspace Vulnerability Assessment/Hunter Weapon System, which is designed to "find, fix, track, target, engage and assess advanced persistent threats" to missions on the Air Force information network. It includes three Cyber Protection Teams that conduct global cyberspace operations to deter, disrupt and defeat adversary cyberspace operations. It also performs penetration testing of cyberspace systems. Its Detachment 1 performs communications security assessments.

== Lineage ==
- Constituted as the 92d Pursuit Squadron (Interceptor) on 13 January 1942

Activated on 9 February 1942
Redesignated 92d Fighter Squadron on 15 May 1942
Inactivated on 27 December 1945

- Activated on 15 October 1946

Redesignated 92d Fighter-Interceptor Squadron on 20 January 1950
Redesignated 92d Fighter-Bomber Squadron on 1 April 1954
Redesignated 92d Tactical Fighter Squadron on 8 July 1958
Inactivated on 31 March 1993

- Redesignated 92d Information Warfare Aggressor Squadron

Activated on 1 November 2000
Redesignated 92d Information Operations Squadron on 1 November 2006
Redesignated 92d Cyberspace Operations Squadron 30 October 2015

=== Assignments ===
- 81st Pursuit Group (later 81st Fighter Group), 9 February 1942 – 8 December 1945
- 81st Fighter Group later 81st Fighter-Interceptor Group), 15 October 1946 (attached to 81st Fighter-Bomber Wing after 22 April 1954)
- 81st Fighter-Bomber Wing (later 81st Tactical Fighter) Wing), 8 February 1955 – 31 March 1993
- 318th Information Operations Group, 1 November 2000 – present

=== Stations ===
- Morris Field, North Carolina, 9 February 1942
- Dale Mabry Field, Florida, 1 May 1942
- Muroc Army Air Field, California, 26 June – 4 October 1942
- Port Lyautey, French Morocco, 11 November 1942
- Louis Gentil Field, French Morocco, 16 December 1942
- Mediouna Airfield, French Morocco, c. 5 January 1943
- Thelepte Airfield, Tunisia], 12 January 1943
- Le Kouif Airfield, Algeria, 17 February 1943
- Youks-les-Bains Airfield, Algeria, 22 February 1943
- Le Kouif Airfield, Algeria, 24 February 1943
- Thelepte Airfield, Tunisia, 6 March 1943
- Youks-les-Bains Airfield, Algeria, 29 March 1943
- Maison Blanche Airport, Algeria, 6 April 1943
- Warnier Airfield, Algeria, 12 May 1943
- Sidi Ahmed, Tunisia, 15 August 1943
- Castelvetrano, Sicily, Italy, 13 October 1943
- Capodichino, Italy, 17 January – 14 February 194
- Karachi, India, 22 March 1944
- Kwanghan China, 15 May 1944
- Fungwanshan, China, 12 February 1945
- Huhsien, China, 20 August 1945
- Hsian, China, October-27 December 1945
- Wheeler Field, Hawaii, 15 October 1946 – 21 May 1949
- Kirtland Air Force Base, New Mexico, 17 June 1949
- Moses Lake Air Force Base, Washington, 30 April 1950 – 21 August 1951
- RAF Shepherds Grove, England, 5 September 1951
- RAF Manston, England, 28 March 1955
- RAF Bentwaters, England, 30 April 1958 – 31 March 1993
- Kelly Air Force Base (later Kelly Field Annex), 1 November 2000 – 30 Sep 2018
- Lackland AFB (Medina Annex), 30 Sep 2018 – present

=== Aircraft ===
- Bell P-39 Airacobra, 1942–1944
- Lockheed P-38 Lightning, 1943–1944
- Curtiss P-40 Warhawk, 1944
- Republic P-47 Thunderbolt, 1944–1945
- North American P-51 (later F-51) Mustang, 1946–1949, 1951
- Lockheed F-80 Shooting Star, 1949
- North American F-86A Sabre, 1949–1955
- Republic F-84 Thunderjet, 1954–1959
- McDonnell F-101 Voodoo, 1958–1966
- McDonnell F-4 Phantom II, 1965–1979
- Fairchild Republic A-10 Thunderbolt II, 1978–1993
