= 91st Attack Squadron =

91st Attack Squadron

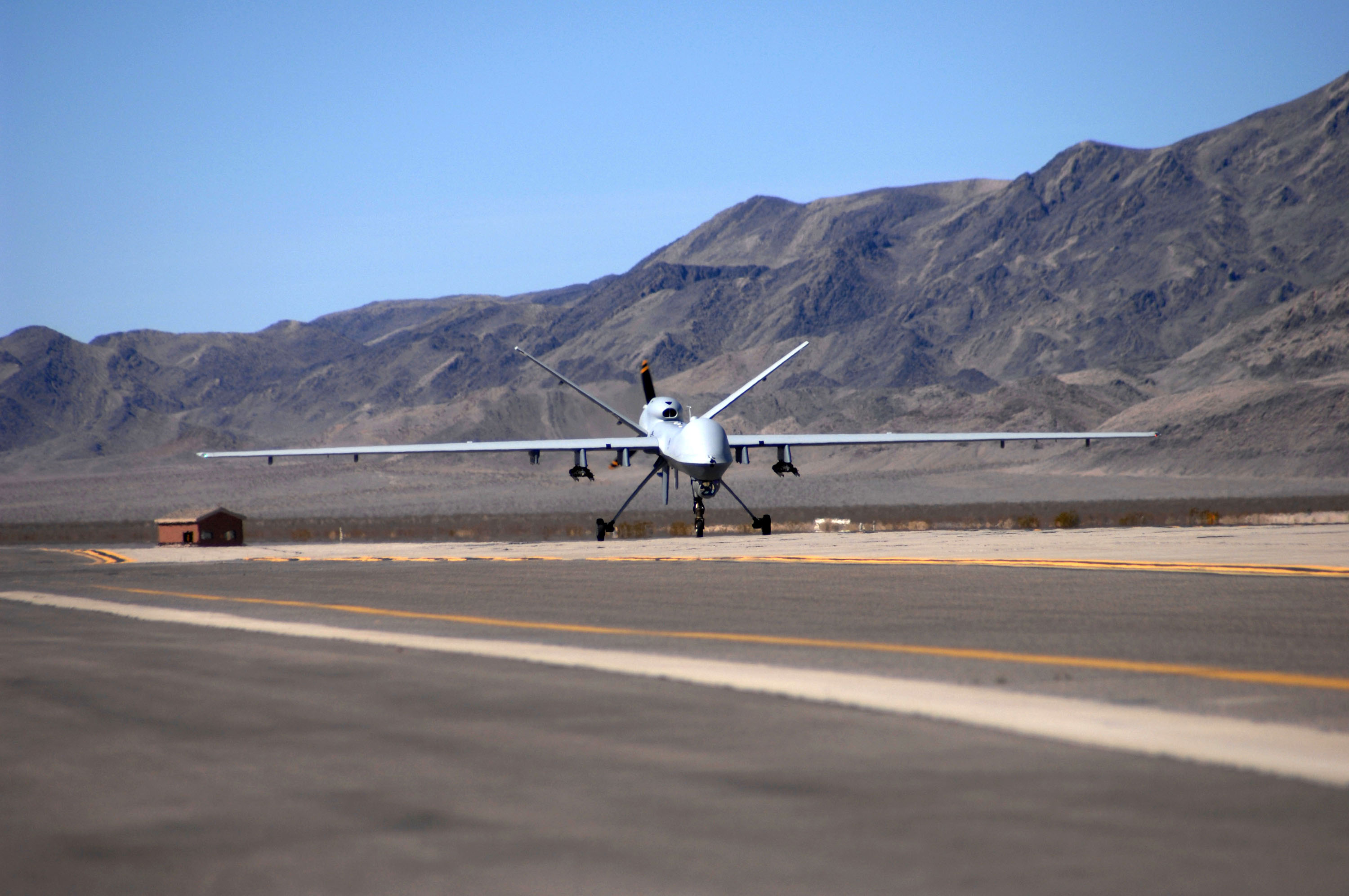
- An MQ-9 Reaper at Creech AFB
- Active: 1942–1945; 1946–1992; 5 April 2013–present
- Country: United States
- Branch: United States Air Force
- Role: remotely piloted vehicle ground attack
- Part of: Air Combat Command
- Nickname(s): Blue Streaks
- Engagements: Mediterranean Theater of Operations; China-Burma-India Theater
- Decorations: Air Force Outstanding Unit Award

Insignia
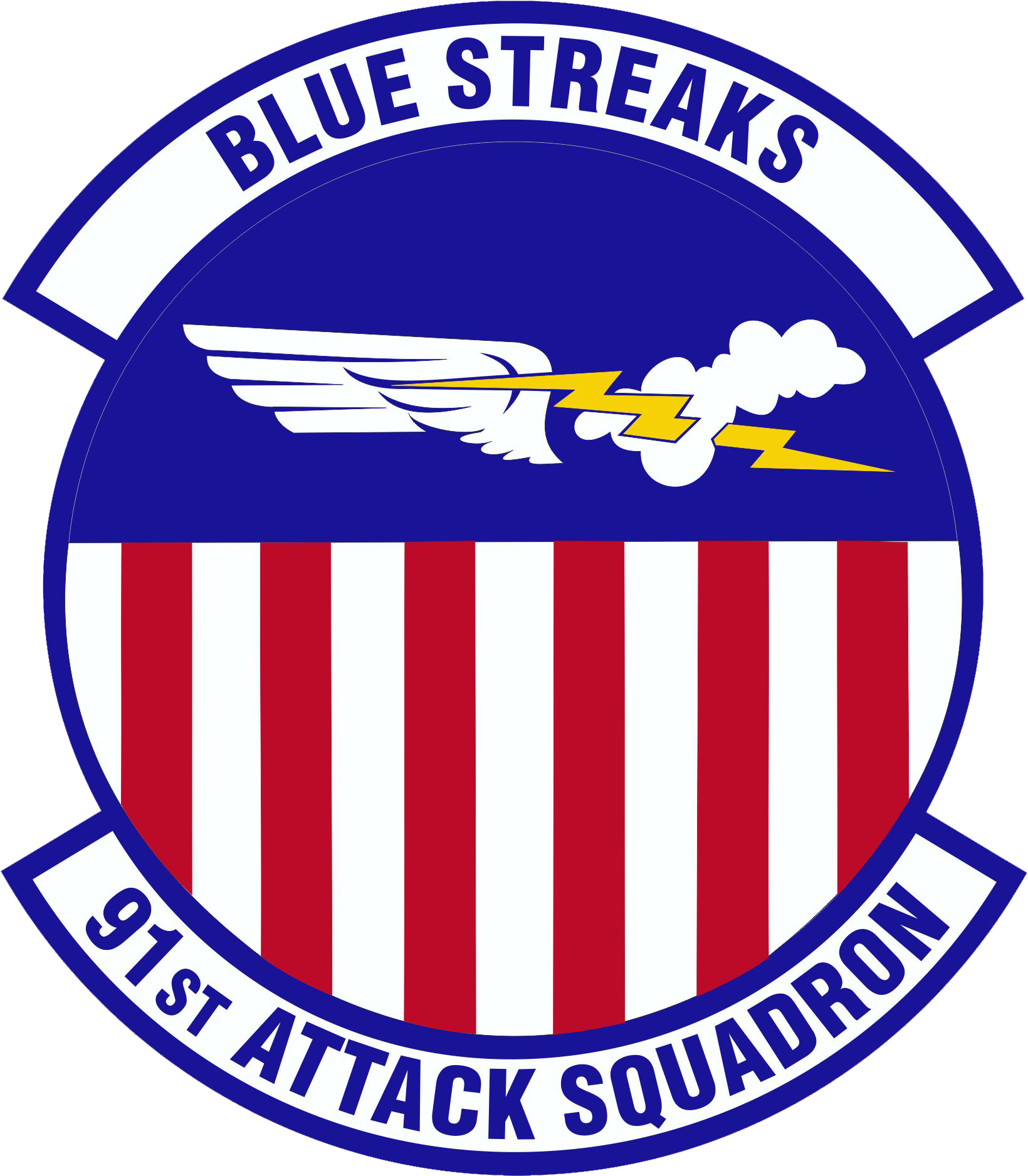
- 91st Attack Squadron emblem

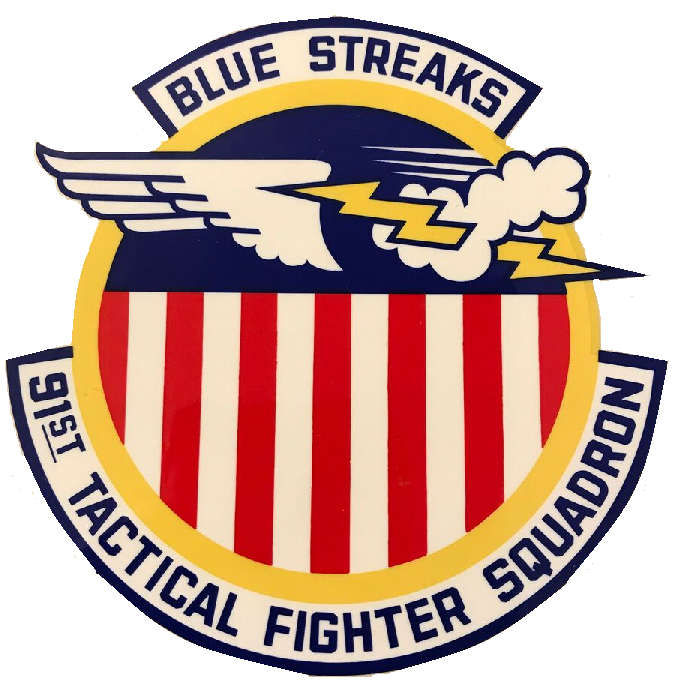
- 91st Tactical Fighter Squadron emblem (approved 14 June 1951)

The 91st Attack Squadron is a United States Air Force Reserve unit based at Creech Air Force Base, Nevada, where it is an associate unit of the 432nd Wing operating General Atomics MQ-9 Reaper and RQ-170 Sentinel unmanned aerial vehicles (UAVs).

Previously it was assigned to 81st Tactical Fighter Wing, USAFE, stationed at RAF Woodbridge, England, flying A-10A Thunderbolt II, until inactivated on 14 August 1992.

== Mission ==
The squadron's mission is to maintain combat-ready reservists to train and equip the combat air forces to conduct integrated and expeditionary combat operations, as well as conduct training operations in the MQ-1 Predator and MQ-9 Reaper Remotely Piloted Aircraft.

== History ==
=== World War II ===
The squadron was activated in early 1942 under III Fighter Command in North Carolina. Initially trained with P-39 Airacobras, re-equipped with P-38 Lightnings.

Moved overseas, October 1942 – February 1943, the ground echelon arriving in French Morocco with the force that invaded North Africa on 8 November, and the air echelon, which had trained for a time in England, arriving in North Africa between late December 1942 and early February 1943.

Began combat with Twelfth Air Force in January 1943. Supported ground operations during the Allied drive against Axis forces in Tunisia. Patrolled the coast of North Africa and protected Allied shipping in the Mediterranean Sea, April–July 1943. Provided cover for the convoys that landed troops on Pantelleria on 11 June and on Sicily on 10 July 1943. Supported the landings at Anzio on 22 January 1944 and flew patrols in that area for a short time.

Reassigned to the China-Burma-India Theater (CBI) and moved to India, February–March 1944. Initially performed training with P-40 and P-47 aircraft. Moved to China in May and became part of Fourteenth Air Force. Continued training and on occasion flew patrol and escort missions before returning to full-time combat duty in January 1945. Attacked enemy airfields and installations, flew escort missions, and aided the operations of Chinese ground forces by attacking troop concentrations, ammunition dumps, lines of communications, and other targets to hinder Japanese efforts to move men and materiel to the front.

Inactivated in China on 27 December 1945.

=== Cold War ===
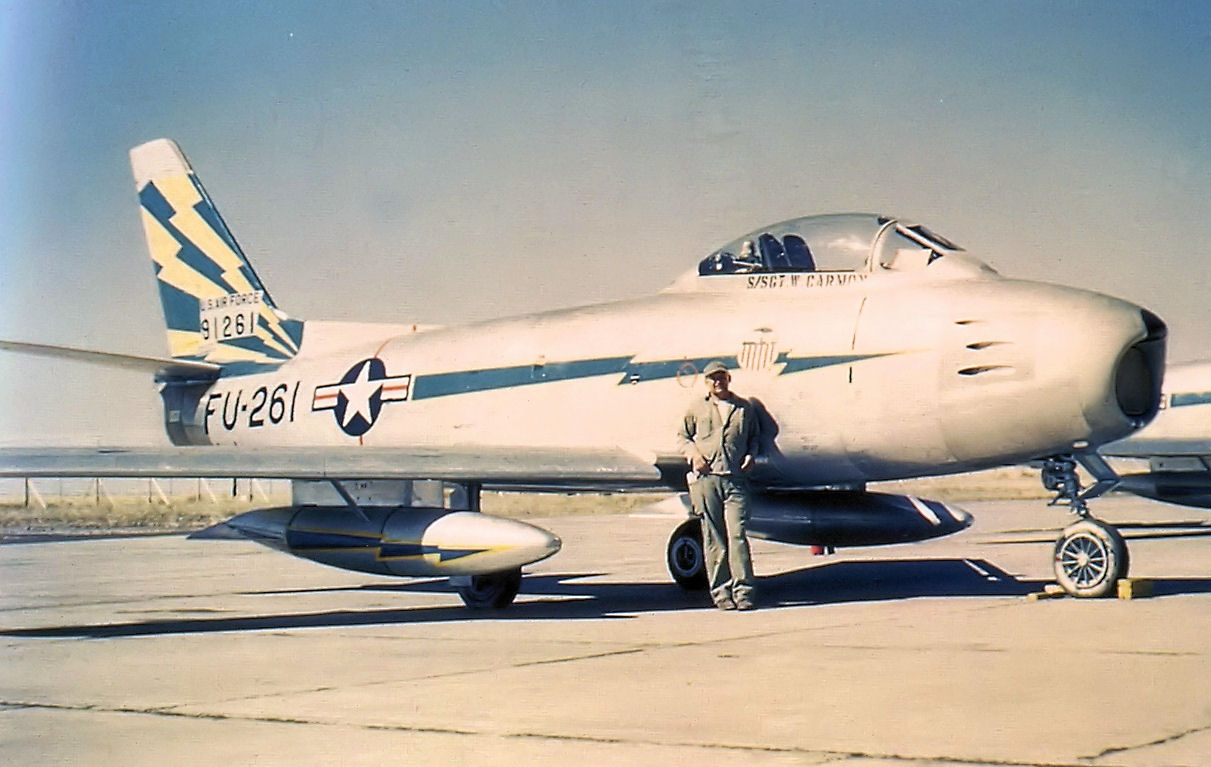
91st FIS F-86A Sabre 49-1251

Reactivated at Wheeler Field, Hawaii Territory in late 1946. Equipped with P-51 Mustangs and performed air defense of the Hawaiian Islands until 1949. Was reassigned to the Tactical Air Command Ninth Air Force, being stationed in New Mexico. Re-equipped with F-80 Shooting Star jet aircraft, trained as a tactical fighter squadron. Upgraded to F-86 Sabres in 1950.

Reassigned to Air Defense Command, becoming part of the Western Air Defense Force, being moved to Moses Lake AFB, Washington. In Washington the squadron's mission was the air defense of eastern Washington, including the Grand Coulee Dam and the Hanford Nuclear Reservation.

==== United States Air Forces in Europe ====
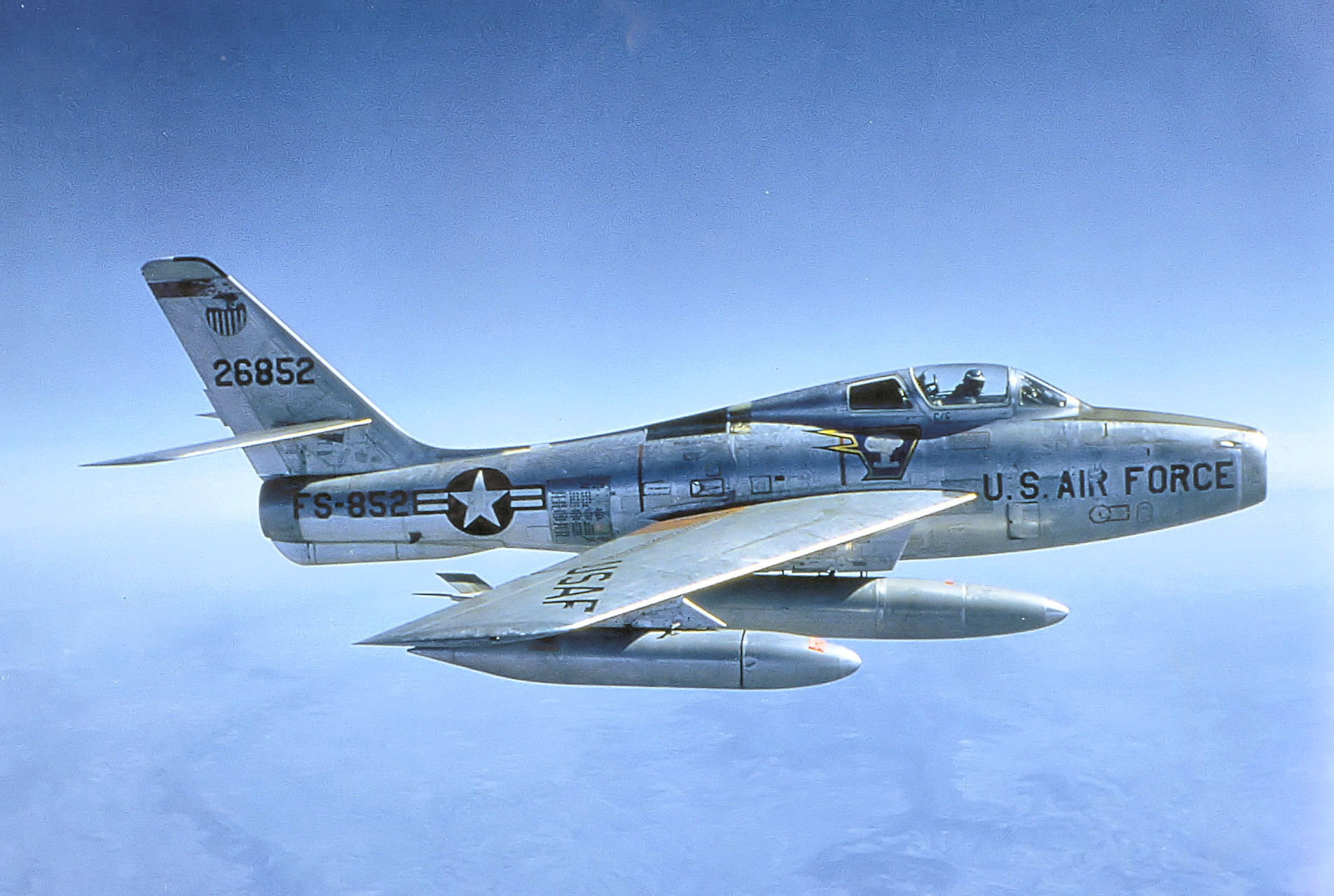
91st TFS F-84F 52-6852

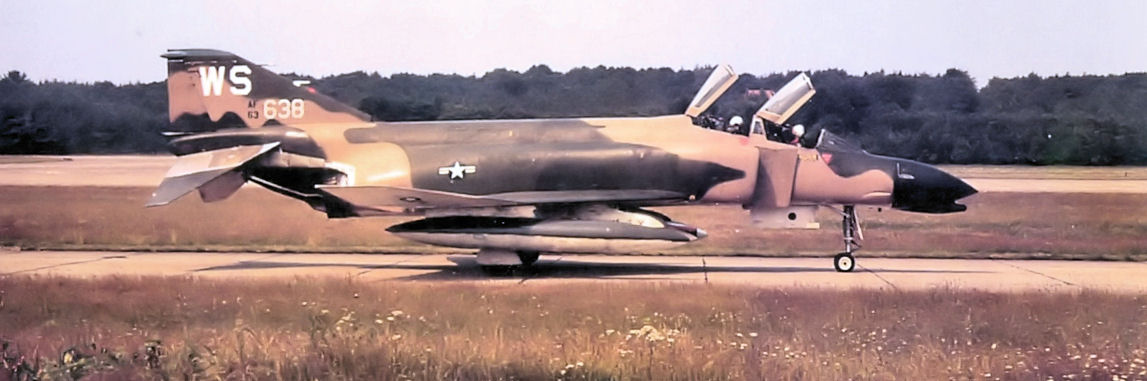
91st TFS F-4C Phantom II 63-7638, wearing the short-lived squadron code 'WS', July 1971

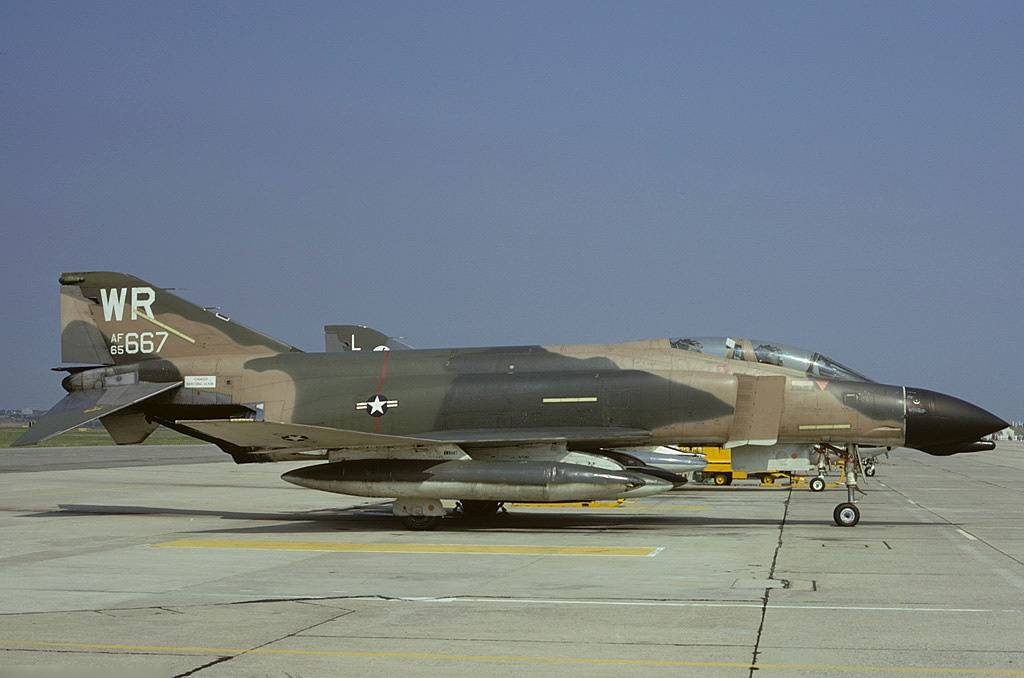
F-4D Phantom II 65-0667, 81st TFW, wearing the Woodbridge/Bentwaters wing code 'WR', at RAF Valley, 1975

Ordered to the United Kingdom in 1951, mission to assist the Royal Air Force in the Air Defense of East Anglia, being assigned to the newly refurbished RAF Bentwaters. Also operated from a dispersed station, RAF Shepherds Grove about forty miles apart.

The squadron was one of the first Sabre Jet unit to be based in Europe, and the first to form an integral part of the peacetime air defense of Great Britain. In this role, the squadron came under the operational control of the RAF Fighter Command No. 11 Group during the actual defense of the United Kingdom, and for combined operational training. Under USAFE, the squadron came under the control of Third Air Force which coordinated its activities with the RAF.

In October 1954 the mission of the squadron changed from fighter-interceptor to fighter-bomber operations, carrying both conventional and nuclear weapons. The squadron was charged with tactical operations in support of USAFE and NATO, with air defense as a secondary mission. To reflect this change, the unit traded in its F-86s for the F-84F Thunderstreak.

Beginning in the fall of 1958, the squadron was reequipped with the McDonnell F-101 Voodoo. The F-101 was configured as a fighter bomber, intended to carry a single nuclear weapon for use against battlefield targets such as airfields. The Voodos were equipped with Low Angle Drogued Delivery (LADD) and Low Altitude Bombing System (LABS) equipment for its primary mission of delivering nuclear weapons at extremely low altitudes. Pilots were trained for one-way missions into Soviet territory to increase effective range at some cost in negating pilot recovery.

In November 1965, the squadron received McDonnell F-4 Phantom II to replace the Voodoos. Initially receiving the F-4C this was later upgraded to the more capable F-4D during late 1972 and 1973. Began conversion to the Republic A-10 Thunderbolt II in June 1979. The A-10 being a single-seat, twin-engine jet aircraft designed to provide close air support (CAS) of ground forces by attacking tanks, armored vehicles, and other ground targets. With the A-10, the squadron's mission changed to close air support and battlefield air interdiction in support of NATO ground forces.

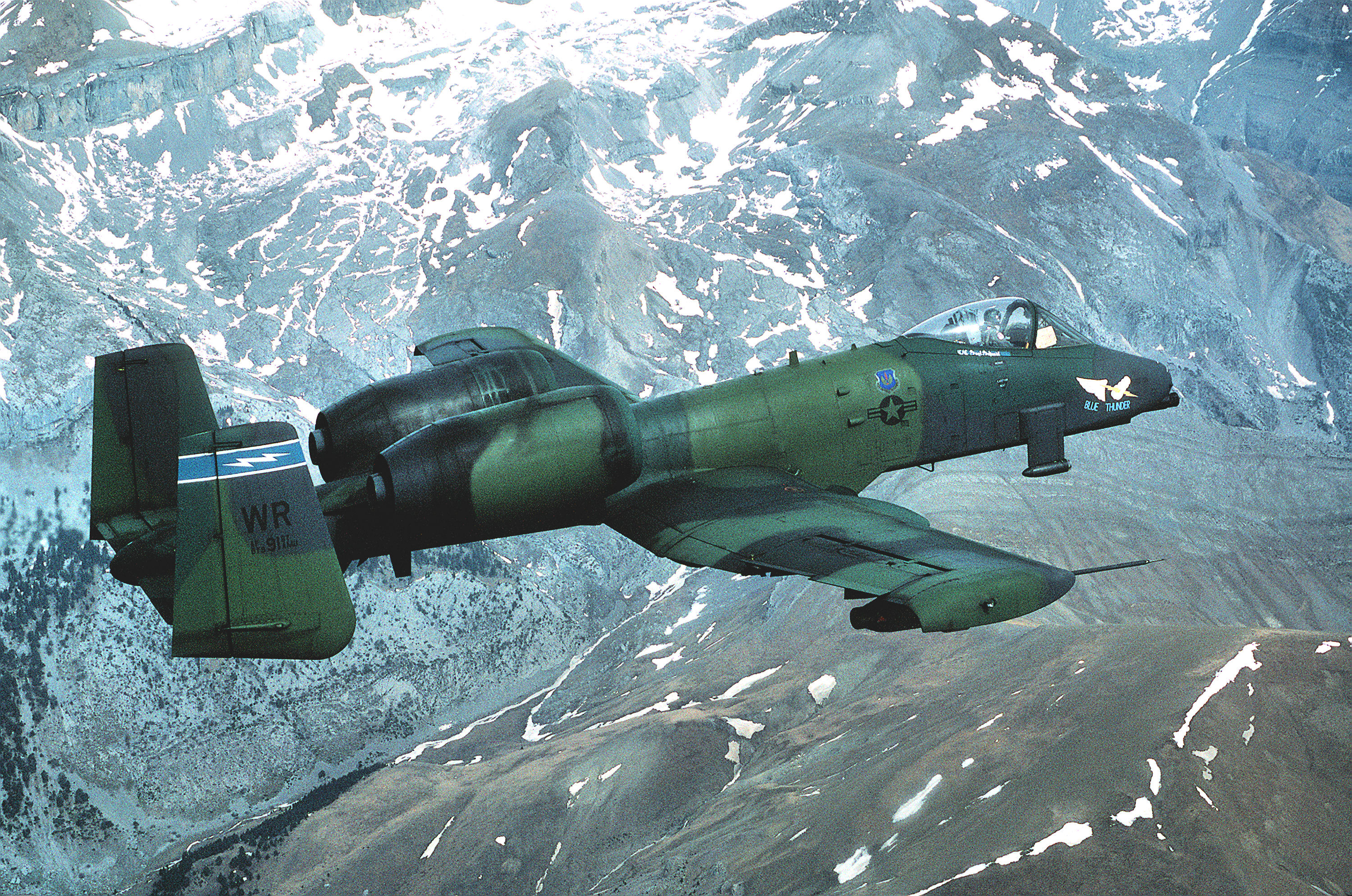
A squadron A-10A Thunderbolt II flying through the Pyrenees mountains

With the end of the Cold War in 1991, the USAF presence at Woodbridge and its sister base Bentwaters was gradually phased down. It was announced that the base would be closed and the squadron would be inactivated. Squadron was inactivated on 14 August 1992.

=== UAV operations ===
In 2013 the squadron was redesignated the 91st Attack Squadron and reactivated at Creech Air Force Base, Nevada, where it is an associate of the 432d Wing.

== Lineage ==
- Constituted as the 91st Pursuit Squadron (Interceptor) on 13 January 1942

Activated on 9 February 1942
Redesignated 91st Fighter Squadron on 15 May 1942
Inactivated on 27 December 1945

- Activated on 15 October 1946

Redesignated: 91st Fighter-Interceptor Squadron on 20 January 1950
Redesignated: 91st Fighter-Bomber Squadron on 1 April 1954
Redesignated: 91st Tactical Fighter Squadron on 8 July 1958
Inactivated on 14 August 1992

- Redesignated 91st Attack Squadron

Activated c. 5 April 2013

=== Assignments ===
- 81st Pursuit Group (later 81st Fighter Group), 9 February 1942 – 8 December 1945
- 81st Fighter Group (later 81st Fighter-Interceptor Group), 15 October 1946 (attached to 81st Fighter-Bomber Wing after 22 April 1954)
- 81st Fighter-Bomber Wing (later 81st Tactical Fighter Wing), 8 February 1955 – 31 March 1993
- 926th Group, c. 5 April 2013
- 726th Operations Group, 5 December 2014 – present

=== Stations ===
- Morris Field, North Carolina, 9 February 1942
- Dale Mabry Field, Florida, 1 May 1942
- Muroc Army Air Field, California, 26 June – 4 October 1942
- Port Lyautey, French Morocco, 11 November 1942
- Louis Gentil Field, French Morocco, 16 December 1942
- Mediouna Airfield, French Morocco, c. 5 January 1943
- Thelepte Airfield, Tunisia, 12 January 1943
- Le Kouif Airfield, Algeria, 17 February 1943
- Youks-les-Bains Airfield, Algeria, 22 February 1943
- Le Kouif Airfield, Algeria, 24 February 1943
- Thelepte Airfield, Tunisia, 6 March 1943
- Youks-les-Bains Airfield, Algeria, 29 March 1943
- Maison Blanche Airport, Algeria 6 April 1943
- Warnier Airfield, Algeria, 12 May 1943
- Sidi Ahmed, Tunisia, 15 August 1943
- Castelvetrano, Sicily, Italy, 13 October 1943
- Capodichino, Italy, 17 January – 14 February 1944
- Karachi, India, 22 March 1944
- Kwanghan China, 15 May 1944
- Fungwanshan, China, 12 February 1945
- Huhsien, China, 20 August 1945
- Hsian, China, October-27 December 1945
- Wheeler Field, Hawaii, 15 October 1946 – 21 May 1949
- Kirtland Air Force Base, New Mexico, 17 June 1949
- Moses Lake Air Force Base, Washington, 30 April 1950 – 21 August 1951
- RAF Shepherds Grove, England, 5 September 1951
- RAF Manston, England, 28 March 1955
- RAF Bentwaters, England, 30 April 1958 – 31 January 1980
- RAF Woodbridge, England, 1 February 1980 – 14 August 1992
- Creech Air Force Base, Nevada, c. 5 April 2013–present

=== Aircraft ===
- Bell P-39 Airacobra, 1942–1944
- Lockheed P-38 Lightning, 1943–1944
- Curtiss P-40 Warhawk, 1944
- Republic P-47 Thunderbolt, 1944–1945
- North American P-51 Mustang (later F-51), 1946–1949, 1951
- Lockheed F-80 Shooting Star, 1949
- North American F-86A Sabre, 1949–1955
- Republic F-84 Thunderjet (F-105), 1954–1959
- McDonnell F-101 Voodoo, 1958–1966
- McDonnell F-4 Phantom II, 1965–1979
- Fairchild Republic A-10 Thunderbolt II, 1978–1992
- General Atomics MQ-1 Predator, 2013–present
- General Atomics MQ-9 Reaper, 2013–present
