= Sanford K. Moats =

United States Air Force general (1921–2023)

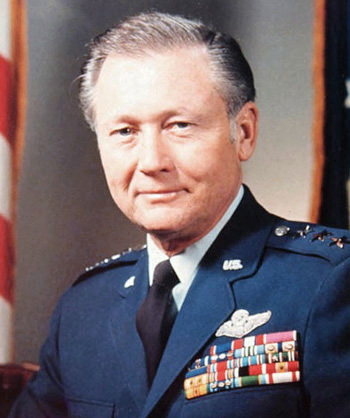
- Born: December 4, 1921; Kansas City, Missouri, U.S.
- Died: December 28, 2023 (aged 102)
- Military career
- Allegiance: United States of America
- Branch: United States Army Air Forces; United States Air Force
- Service years: 1943–1977
- Rank: Lieutenant General
- Nickname: "Sandy"
- Conflicts: World War II; Operation Bodenplatte
- Awards: Distinguished Service Cross, Distinguished Service Medal with oak leaf cluster, Legion of Merit, Distinguished Flying Cross with oak leaf cluster, Air Medal with 11 oak leaf clusters, Joint Service Commendation Medal, Air Force Commendation Medal with two oak leaf clusters

Lieutenant General Sanford Kenneth Moats (December 4, 1921 – December 28, 2023) was an American Air Force lieutenant general and fighter ace. He was vice commander of the Tactical Air Command, with headquarters at Langley Air Force Base, Virginia, responsible for maintaining peak combat efficiency in the tactical fighter and reconnaissance operations, and training air and ground crews as required for U.S. Air Forces in Europe and Pacific Air Forces.

== Biography ==
Moats was born in 1921, in Kansas City, Missouri. He attended Kansas State College before entering the Army Air Corps as an aviation cadet. He completed pilot training and was commissioned a second lieutenant in December 1943.

Moats went to England in 1944 as a P-51 Mustang pilot. During his service in the European Theater of Operations, he flew 89 combat missions with a total of 367 combat hours and qualified as an ace. Moats participated in repelling the German Luftwaffe's Operation Bodenplatte.

In 1945 he was transferred to the Pacific area for duty with the U.S. Army Air Forces and returned later that year to Army Air Forces headquarters in Washington, D.C. In 1947 he again went overseas and was assigned to the 81st Fighter Wing at Wheeler Field, Hawaii. Following exchange duty in 1950 with the U.S. Marine Corps, he rejoined the 81st Fighter Wing at Royal Air Force Station Bentwaters, England, in 1951, as a pilot, operations officer, and then commander of the 91st Fighter Squadron.

Moats was assigned in September 1955 to the Office of the Secretary of the Air Force, Washington, D.C., where he was chief of the Civil Branch, Community Relations Division. In December 1957 he assumed command of the 60th Fighter Interceptor Squadron at Otis Air Force Base, Mass. In September 1960 he was named director, of Combat Operations, 26th Air Division at Hancock Field, Syracuse, N.Y., and became director of operations and training before leaving there in January 1963.

Moats attended the Military Assistance Institute and in March 1963 was assigned to the Military Assistance Advisory Group, Republic of China, in Taipei.

In July 1965 he became vice commander of the 401st Tactical Fighter Wing at England Air Force Base, La. During this tour of duty, he flew 18 combat missions while on temporary duty in Southeast Asia. The 401st Wing moved in April 1966 to Torrejon Air Base, Spain, where he assumed command of the wing in April 1967, and became vice commander of Sixteenth Air Force in November 1968.

Moats was assigned as vice commander, Tenth Air Force, at Richards-Gebaur Air Force Base, Missouri, in August 1969, and was commander, 26th Air Division and 26th North American Air Defense Command Region, at Luke Air Force Base, Ariz., from November 1969 until August 1970.

Moats returned to Europe in September 1970 as chief of the Joint U.S. Military Group-Military Assistance Advisory Group, Spain, and in October 1972 assumed command of Sixteenth Air Force.

On August 20, 1973, he was promoted to lieutenant general and appointed commander of the Sixth Allied Tactical Air Force with headquarters at Izmir, Turkey. He became vice commander, of Tactical Air Command, Langley Air Force Base, Va., in September 1975. Moats retired on July 1, 1977.

His military decorations and awards include the Distinguished Service Cross, Distinguished Service Medal with oak leaf cluster, Legion of Merit, Distinguished Flying Cross with oak leaf cluster, Air Medal with 11 oak leaf clusters, Joint Service Commendation Medal, Air Force Commendation Medal with two oak leaf clusters, Belgian Croix de Guerre with palm, and the Spanish Grand Cross of the Order of the Aeronautical Merit with white device.

Moats' hometown was Mission, Kansas. He died on December 28, 2023, at the age of 102
