= 81st Fighter-Bomber Group =

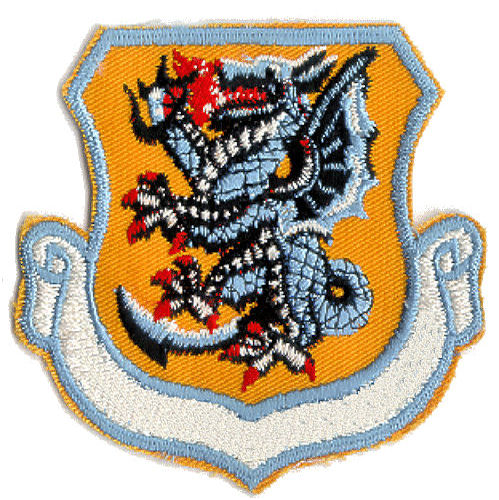
- Emblem of the 81st Fighter-Bomber Group
- Active: 1942–1945, 1946–1955
- Country: United States
- Branch: United States Air Force
- Type: Air Defense, Tactical Fighter-Bombing
- Part of: United States Air Forces in Europe
- Mottos: Le Nom, Les Armes, La Loyauté - The Name, The Arms, and Loyalty
- Engagements: : World War II; European Campaign (1943–1944) Asiatic-Pacific Campaign (1944–1945)

The 81st Fighter-Bomber Group (81 FBG) is an inactive United States Air Force unit. It was last assigned to the 81st Fighter-Bomber Wing at RAF Bentwaters, England. It was inactivated on 8 February 1955.

== History ==
For additional history, see 81st Training Wing

=== World War II ===
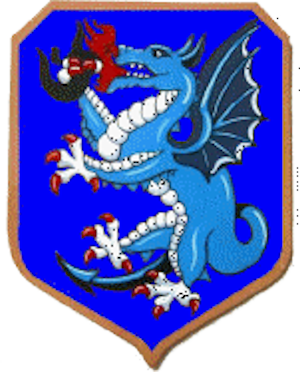
World War II 81st Group emblem

The unit was constituted as the 81st Pursuit Group (Intercepter) on 13 January 1942, and activated on 9 February 1942, with the 91st, 92d, and 93d Pursuit Squadrons assigned. It was redesignated 81st Fighter Group in May 1942 and trained with Bell P-39 Airacobras.

The group moved overseas between October 1942 and February 1943, the ground echelon arriving in French Morocco with the force that invaded North Africa on 8 November, and the air echelon, which had trained for a time in England, arriving in North Africa between late December 1942 and early February 1943.

Te group began combat with Twelfth Air Force in January 1943. It supported ground operations during the Allied drive against Axis forces in Tunisia. The group patrolled the coast of North Africa and protected Allied shipping in the Mediterranean Sea in April through July 1943 and provided cover for the convoys that landed troops on Pantelleria on 11 June and on Sicily on 10 July 1943. The group supported the landings at Anzio on 22 January 1944 and flew patrols in that area for a short time.

Group aircraft from its time in England through its action Italy consisted of P-39s and the British export version, the P-400. P-400s still had RAF camouflage and five digit alphanumeric serial number, RAF pilot's harness, and a 20 mm cannon versus the US 37 mm. These P-39s and P-400s were available due to a Murmansk Convoy so devastated, it turned back. The fighters were uncrated, assembled and test flown by the pilots that would take them to North Africa, Sicily and Italy. The 81st also flew P-38 Lightnings on patrol in the Mediterranean. These aircraft were loaned from the 1st Fighter Group.

The flight of the P-39/400s of the 81st and 350th Fighter Groups to Morocco, is still in the Guinness Book of Records, as the largest flight over the greatest distance. A few of these Aircraft "experienced engine problems" and landed in Lisbon, Portugal. Perhaps the Pilots were hoping to sit out the duration. The Portuguese government kept these Fighters and handed the pilots over to the U.S. Embassy. These pilots flew "Tail-end Charlie" for most of the rest of their tour.

The group moved to India, February–March 1944, and began training with P-40 and P-47 aircraft. It then moved to China in May and became part of Fourteenth Air Force. The group continued training and on occasion flew patrol and escort missions before returning to full-time combat duty in January 1945. It attacked enemy airfields and installations, flew escort missions, and aided the operations of Chinese ground forces by attacking troop concentrations, ammunition dumps, lines of communications, and other targets to hinder Japanese efforts to move men and material to the front. The 81st was inactivated in China on 27 December 1945.

=== Cold War ===
==== Pacific Air Command ====
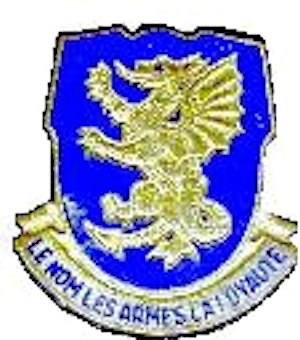
Postwar 81st Group emblem

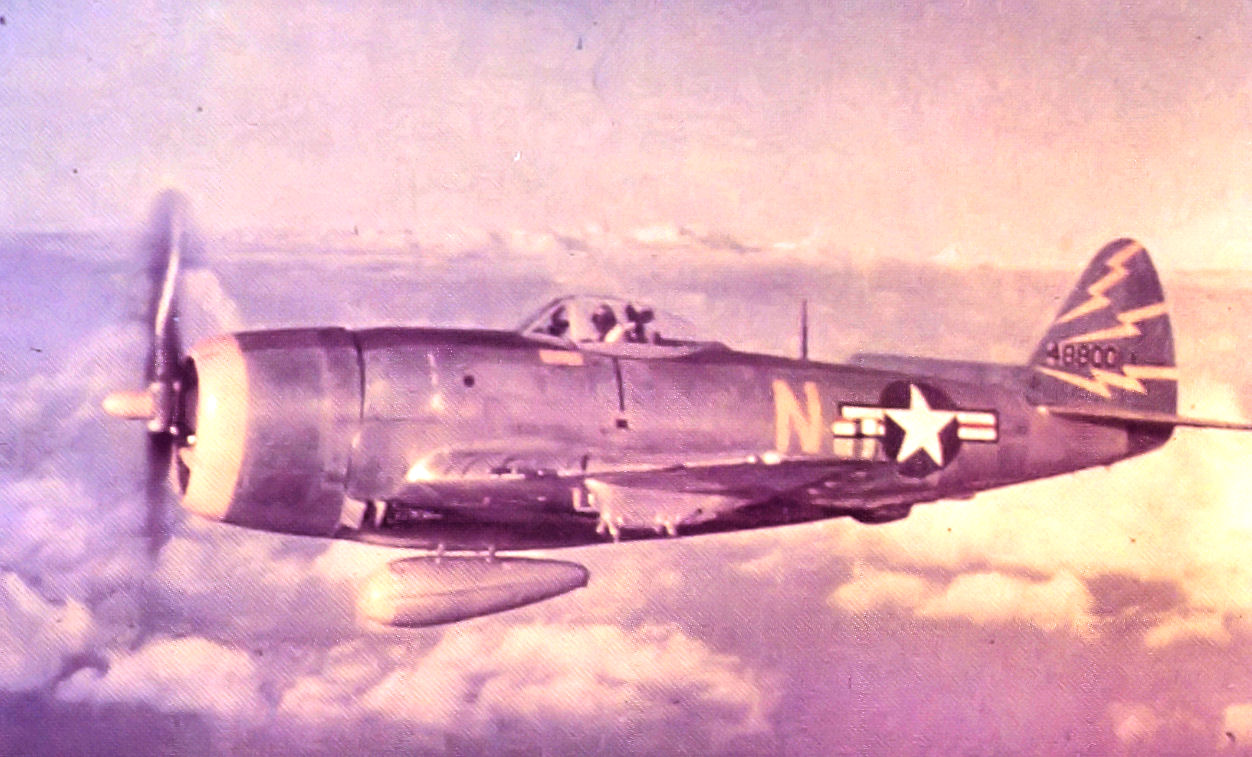
81st FG F-47N 44–8800 over Hawaii about 1949

The 81st Fighter Group, Single Engine was reactivated at Wheeler Field, Hawaii Territory on 15 October 1946. It was assigned to the 7th Fighter Wing of Seventh Air Force (7 AF). The mission of the group was to maintain daylight security of the Hawaiian Islands and to train fighter pilots to a state of combat readiness. The 81st FG was formed largely from the personnel and equipment of the 15th Fighter Group which was inactivated at Wheeler Field the same day.

The group comprised the 91st, 92d and 93d Fighter Squadrons and assumed the P-51D Mustang aircraft of the former 15th FG. The 81st was faced with the arduous task of training personnel for the transition from a fully staffed wartime organization with an abundance of supplies and equipment (15th FG) into an effective peacetime fighter group with limited resources and facilities.

In 1948, the group completed conversion from the P-51 to the F-47N Thunderbolt aircraft. On 15 April 1948 the group was reassigned from the 7th Fighter Wing to the new 81st Fighter Wing (FW) under the Wing/Base (Hobson Plan) reorganization of the Air Force. The 81st FW commanded both the support groups as well as the flying combat 81st Fighter Group and the squadrons assigned to it. On 1 May 1948, the 7th Fighter Wing was redesignated as the 7th Air Division, being moved to England under Strategic Air Command. As a result, the 81st FW came under the direct control of 7 AF, now designated Pacific Air Command.

==== Continental Air Command ====
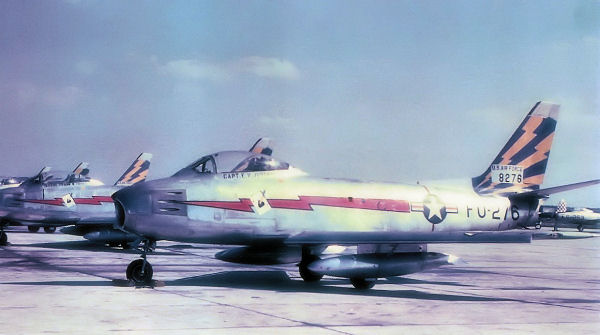
North American F-86A-5-NA Sabre Serial 48-0276 of the 116th Fighter-Interceptor Squadron, 1951.

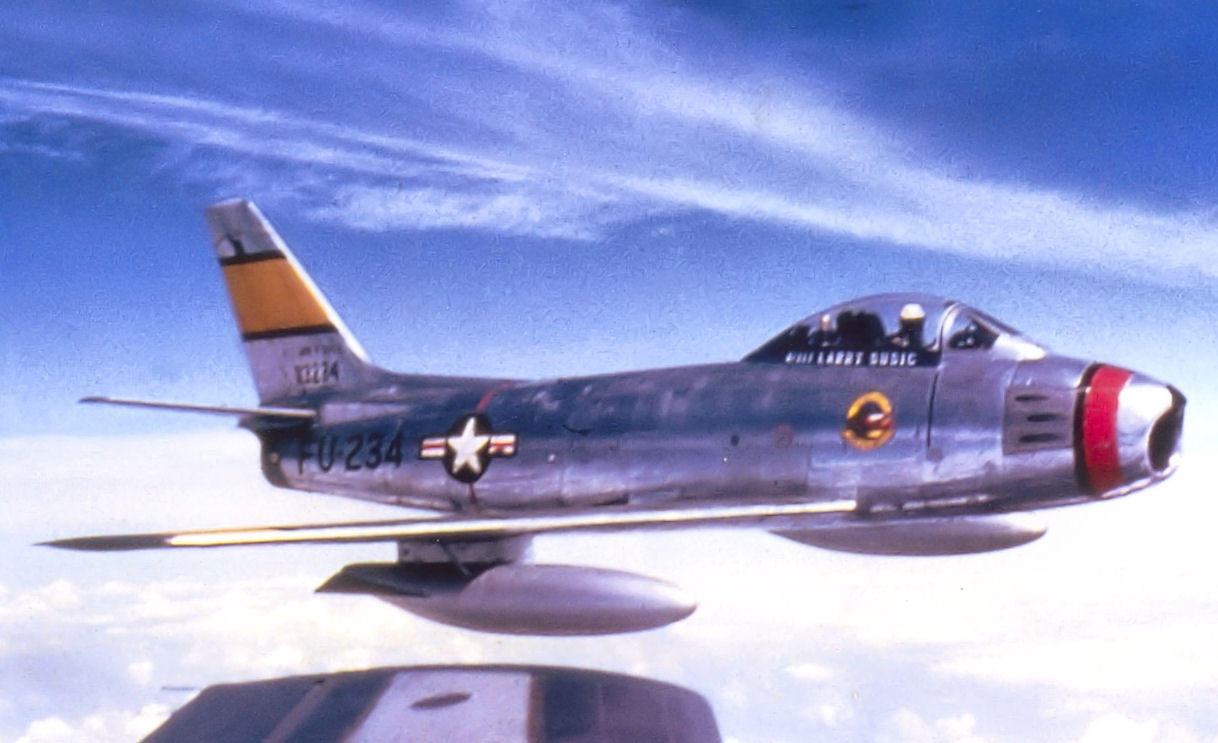
78th FBS North American F-86F Sabre - 51-13234

As a result of limited defense budgets, Continental Air Command (ConAC) was established on 1 December 1948 as a new major command. ConAC was the result of an effort by the new USAF to concentrate all fighter forces deployed within the continental United States to strengthen the air defense of the North American continent. With the establishment of ConAC, Tactical Air Command and Air Defense Command were reduced from major commands to operating agencies under ConAC.

Operations at Wheeler were curtailed on 21 May 1949, the 81st and its parent 81 FW being transferred to Tactical Air Command (TAC)'s Twelfth Air Force at Kirtland Air Force Base, New Mexico. At Kirtland, the group was reequipped with F-80C Shooting Star jet aircraft, and later faster F-86A Sabres, being the third group equipped with the Sabre Jet.

Under ConAC, the 81st FW was redesignated as the 81st Fighter-Interceptor Wing and was attached to Western Air Defense Force on 19 January 1950, while the group became the 81st Fighter-Interceptor Group (81st FIG). Shortly afterward, on 29 April, the 81st FIG moved to Moses Lake AFB, Washington, its mission changed from training for worldwide deployment under TAC to performing air defense of Eastern Washington, primarily the Hanford Nuclear Reservation. The 93d FIS remained at Kirtland and was reassigned to another wing.

On 1 January 1951, ConAC's mission was limited to support of Air Force Reserve and Air National Guard forces, and Air Defense Command (ADC) returned to major command status and the 81st became part of the new command. On 10 February, the 116th Fighter-Interceptor Squadron from the Washington Air National Guard was called to active federal service as a result of the Korean War, and was assigned as one of the squadrons of the 81st FIG, replacing the 93d which had remained at Kirtland when the group moved in 1950. The 116th remained at its home station, Geiger Field, WA and was upgraded to F-86A Sabres. In addition the wing began receiving additional personnel though the activation of Air Force Reserve units, and the wing was brought up to its authorized strength for the first time since its activation.

==== United States Air Forces in Europe ====
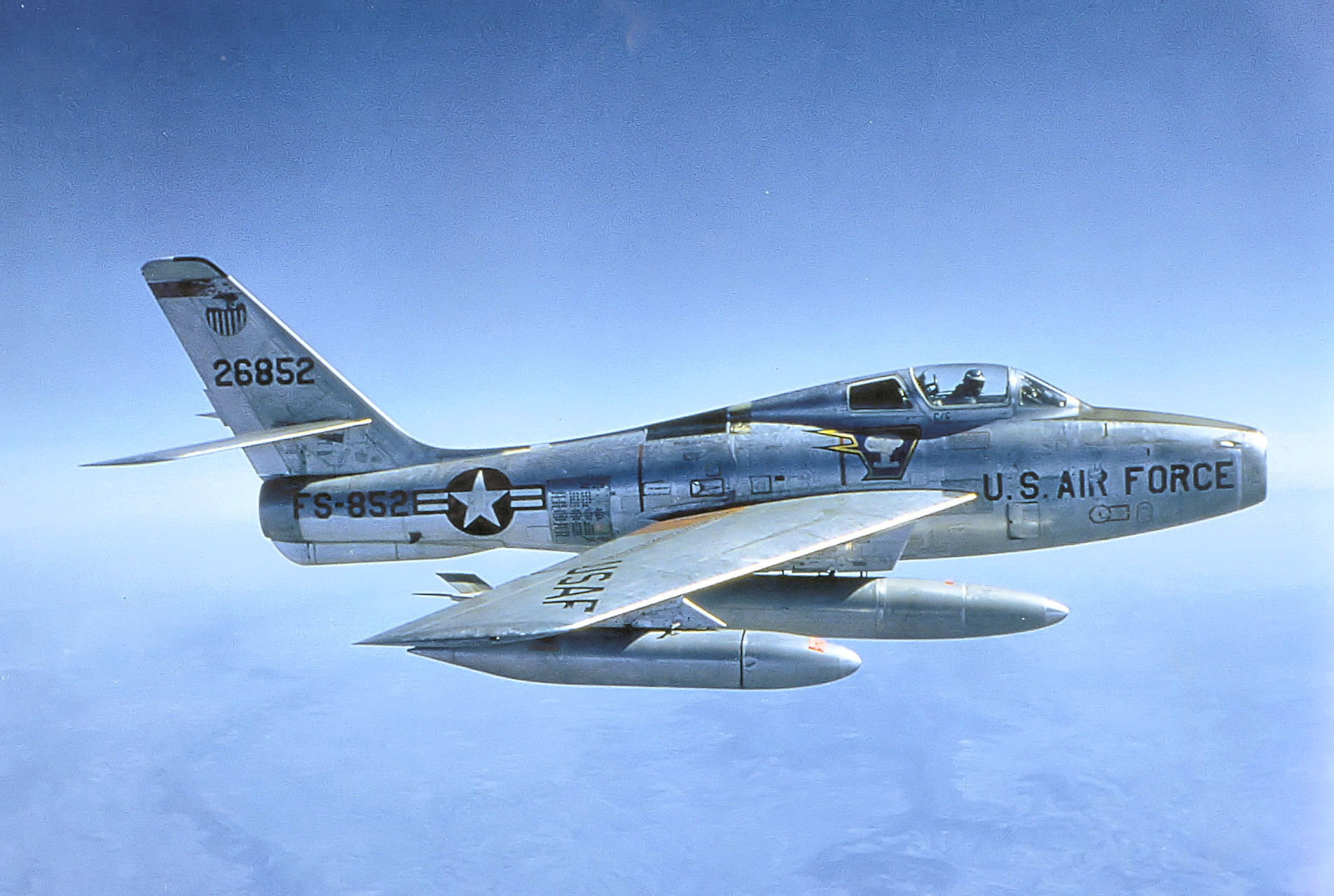
91st TFS F-84F 52-6852

After fourteen months at now renamed Larson Air Force Base, the 81st FIG received movement orders to deploy to England. The 81st FIG deployed to two RAF Stations, built for use during World War II and laid out in a decentralized or dispersed plan. One being RAF Bentwaters, the other being RAF Shepherds Grove, both located in East Anglia about forty miles apart. The bulk of the ground station buildings were the metal Nissen hut type, with some wood frame and tar paper buildings, and were grouped together in numbered "sites", widely separated to blend into natural, rustic surroundings for purposes of camouflage. The main administrative building and clubs were of the larger Quonset hut type.

On 1 August 1951, the initial 81st aircraft flew into RAF Shepherds Grove. The group was located at Bentwaters, and worked with Royal Air Force Fighter Command to provide air defense of Great Britain. It was the first F-86 equipped unit in Europe. On 1 November 1952, the federalized 116th FIS was returned to the National Guard and its personnel and equipment transferred to the newly activated 78th Fighter-Interceptor Squadron. In early 1953, the 92d FIS deployed to Fürstenfeldbruck Air Base, Germany to identify unknown aircraft penetrating the US Zone of Occupation after a Czech MiG-15 shot down a Republic F-84 in the US Zone. In April 1954, it changed its mission from air defense to ground attack as the 81st Fighter-Bomber Group and converted to Republic F-84 Aircraft to perform this mission. It was inactivated when United States Air Forces Europe reorganized its nuclear capable wings in the United Kingdom on the dual deputy/support group model and its squadrons were assigned directly to the 81st Fighter-Bomber Wing.

=== Lineage ===
- Constituted as 81st Pursuit Group (Interceptor) on 13 January 1942

Activated on 9 February 1942
Redesignated: 81st Fighter Group (Single Engine) on 15 May 1942
Inactivated on 27 December 1945

- Activated on 15 October 1946

Redesignated 81st Fighter Group, Jet on 29 July 1949
Redesignated: 81st Fighter-Interceptor Group on 1 January 1950
Redesignated: 81st Fighter-Bomber Group on 1 April 1954
Inactivated on 8 February 1955

- Redesignated 81st Tactical Fighter Group on 31 July 1985 (remained inactive).

=== Assignments ===
- III Fighter Command, 9 February 1942
- IV Fighter Command, 28 June 1942
- 7th Fighter Wing: 27 September 1942
- Twelfth Air Force, 5 January 1943
- Tenth Air Force, 2 March 1944

Attached to Fourteenth Air Force, 2 March – 12 May 1944
Attached to 312th Fighter Wing, 12 May 1944 – 1 October 1945

- Seventh Air Force 15 October 1946
- 7th Air Division, 1 May 1946
- 81st Fighter Wing (later 81st Fighter-Interceptor Wing, 81st Fighter-Bomber Wing), 1 May 1948 – 8 February 1955

=== Components ===
- 78th Fighter-Interceptor (later Fighter-Bomber) Squadron: 1 November 1952 – 8 February 1955
- 91st Pursuit (later Fighter-Interceptor, Fighter Bomber) Squadron: 9 February 1942 – 27 December 1945; 15 October 1946 – 8 February 1955
- 92d Pursuit (later Fighter-Interceptor, Fighter Bomber) Squadron: 9 February 1942 – 27 December 1945; 15 October 1946 – 8 February 1955
- 93d Pursuit (later Fighter-Interceptor) Squadron: 9 February 1942 – 27 December 1945; 15 October 1946 – 1 May 1950
- 116th Fighter Squadron, Jet (later, 116th Fighter-Interceptor Squadron): 10 February 1951 – 1 November 1952

Federalized Washington Air National Guard

=== Stations ===
- Morris Field, North Carolina, February 1942
- Dale Mabry Field, Florida, c. 1 May 1942
- Muroc Army Air Field, California, c. 28 June – 4 October 1942
- Mediouna Airfield, French Morocco, c. 5 January 1943
- Thelepte Airfield, Tunisia, 22 January 1943
- Le Kouif Airfield, Algeria, 17 February 1943
- Youks-les-Bains Airfield, Algeria, 22 February 1943
- Le Kouif Airfield, Algeria, 24 February 1943
- Thelepte Airfield, Tunisia, c. March 1943
- Algeria, c. 3 April 1943
- Monastir Airfield, Tunisia, c. 26 May 1943
- Sidi Ahmed Airfield, Tunisia, 10 August 1943
- Castelvetrano Airfield, Sicily, 12 October 1943
- Montecorvino Airfield, Italy, c. February 1944
- Karachi Airport, India, c. 2 March 1944
- Kwanghan Airfield, China, 12 May 1944
- Fungwansham Airfield, China, February 1945
- Huhsien Airfield, China, August–December 1945
- Wheeler Field, Hawaii Territory, 15 October 1946 – 21 May 1949
- Kirtland AFB, New Mexico, 17 June 1949
- Moses Lake AFB (later Larson AFB), Washington, c. 1 May 1950 – 21 August 1951
- RAF Bentwaters, England, 3 September 1951 – 8 February 1955.

=== Aircraft assigned ===
- P-39 Airacobra, 1942–1944
- P-38 Lightning, 1943–1944
- P-40 Warhawk, 1944
- P-51 Mustang, 1946–1948
- P (later, F)-47 Thunderbolt, 1944–1945; 1948–1949
- F-80 Shooting Star, 1949
- F-86 Sabre, 1949–1954
- F-84F Thunderstreak, 1954–1955

== See also ==
- Aerospace Defense Command Fighter Squadrons
