= Louis Gentil Field =

Abandoned airfield in Morocco

Louis Gentil Field
- Part of Twelfth Air Force

Site information
- Type: Airfield
- Controlled by: United States Army Air Forces

Location
- Coordinates: 32°17′37.37″N 008°30′06.04″W

Site history
- Built: Prior to World War II
- In use: Military airfield from December 1942-January 1943
- Battles/wars: North African Campaign

Location of Louis Gentil Field, French Morocco

Louis Gentil Field is an abandoned airfield in Morocco, located approximately 6 km north-northeast of Youssoufia, about 170 km southwest of Casablanca.

== History ==
Prior to World War II, Louis Gentil Airport was a regional airport built by the French Colonial government, named after Louis Gentil, a French geologist. The airport was seized by invading Allied forces shortly after the Operation Torch landings in November 1942 and used by the United States Army Air Force as a Twelfth Air Force fighter airfield during the North African Campaign.

The 91st and 92d Fighter squadrons of the 81st Fighter Group briefly used the airfield from mid-December 1942 through early 1943 flying P-39 Airacobras. The squadrons moved up to Mediouna Airfield, and the airfield was returned to civil control.

Today the remains of the main runway can be seen in an agricultural field, but no structures remain.
