= 81st Training Wing =

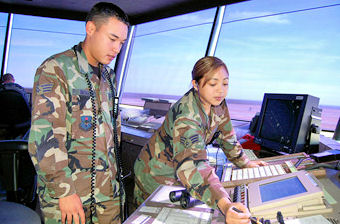
- Air Traffic Control training at Keesler AFB
- Active: 1948–1993; 1993–present
- Country: United States
- Branch: United States Air Force
- Role: Technical Training
- Part of: Air Education and Training Command
- Garrison/HQ: Keesler Air Force Base, Mississippi
- Equipment: see "Aerospace vehicles" section below
- Decorations: Air Force Outstanding Unit Award

Commanders
- Current commander: Colonel Christopher J. Robinson
- Vice-Commander: Colonel Johnathan Eccles
- Command Chief: Chief Master Sergeant Ryan J. Taylor

Insignia
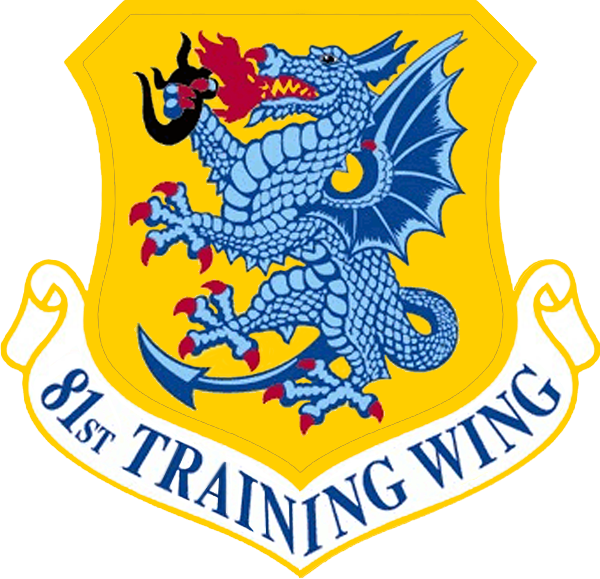
- 81st Training Wing emblem (approved 14 May 1958)

The 81st Training Wing is a wing of the United States Air Force and the host wing at Keesler Air Force Base, Mississippi. The 81st Training Wing has the Air Force's largest Technical Training Group and trains more than 40,000 students annually. Training includes weather, basic electronics, communications electronic systems, communications computer systems, air traffic control, airfield management, command post, air weapons control, precision measurement, education and training, financial management and comptroller, information management, manpower and personnel, radar, ground radio, and network control.

== Mission ==
The 81st Training Wing is in a constant state of transition as it seeks excellence in all we do. It is comprised of several Wing Staff agencies and 3 large Groups of Squadrons. The Groups are...: 81st Training Group, 81st Medical Group, and the 81st Mission Support Group.

The 81st Training Wing is an important link in the chain through Second Air Force established by Headquarters Air Education and Training Command, Randolph Air Force Base, Texas. Our largest training mission is to take young men and women, many fresh from basic military training, and teach them skills to benefit the nation and the Air Force as well as our sister services and foreign countries.

Keesler also does advanced training for pilots in C-130 aircraft, and doctors, nurses, and technicians in medical specialties.

== Units ==
- 81st Training Group
  - 81st Training Support Squadron (Falcons)
  - 333d Training Squadron (Mad Ducks)
  - 334th Training Squadron (Gators)
  - 335th Training Squadron (Bulls)
  - 336th Training Squadron (Red Wolves)
  - 338th Training Squadron (Dark Knights)
- 81st Mission Support Group
  - 81st Communications Squadron
  - 81st Force Support Squadron
  - 81st Security Forces Squadron
  - 81st Logistics Readiness Squadron

== History ==
The U.S. Air Force Historical Research Agency has determined that the 81st Training Wing traces its origins to the 81st Pursuit Group (Intercepter) originally constituted in 1942. The 81st Pursuit Group was activated on 9 February 1942, with the 91st, 92d, and 93d Pursuit Squadrons assigned. It was redesignated 81st Fighter Group in May 1942 and trained with Bell P-39 Airacobras. The group moved overseas between October 1942 and February 1943, to fight in North Africa.

After the Second World War ended, the 81st Fighter Wing was established in 1948. It was activated on 1 May at Wheeler Air Force Base, Hawaii under the Hobson Plan. The 81st Wing included the flying combat 81st Fighter Group, direct descendant of the original 81st Pursuit Group; the squadrons assigned to it; as well as ground maintenance and support groups.

The 81st Fighter Wing conducted air defense of Hawaii, December 1948 – May 1949 when operations at Wheeler were curtailed, the 81st being transferred to the Tactical Air Command Twelfth Air Force and being stationed at Kirtland Air Force Base, New Mexico.

The wing was attached to the Air Defense Command (ADC) Western Air Defense Force on 19 January 1950. Shortly afterwards, on 29 April, the 81st was reassigned to Moses Lake Air Force Base, Washington and transferred to ADC's Fourth Air Force, its mission changed from training for worldwide deployment under TAC to performing air defense of Eastern Washington, primarily the Hanford Nuclear Reservation.

=== United States Air Forces in Europe ===
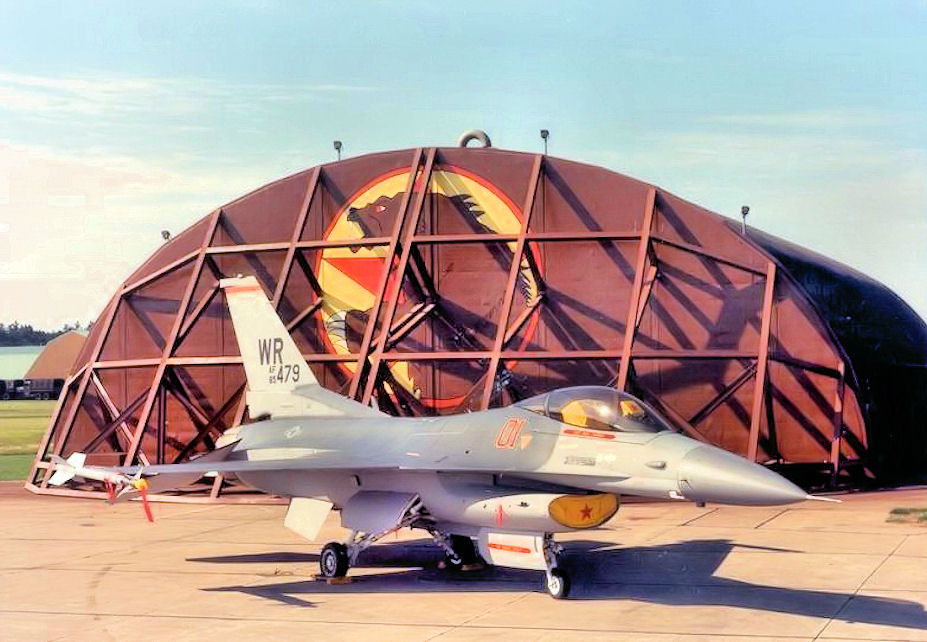
527th AS F-16C Block 30A Fighting Falcon 85-1479 at RAF Bentwaters, England, 1988 upon squadron receipt of the aircraft. This was the first European based F16 aggressor aircraft and it is shown parked in front of a Hardened Aircraft Shelter adorned with a Russian bear and star. The 527th AS was the only USAFE squadron in the United Kingdom to be assigned the F-16.

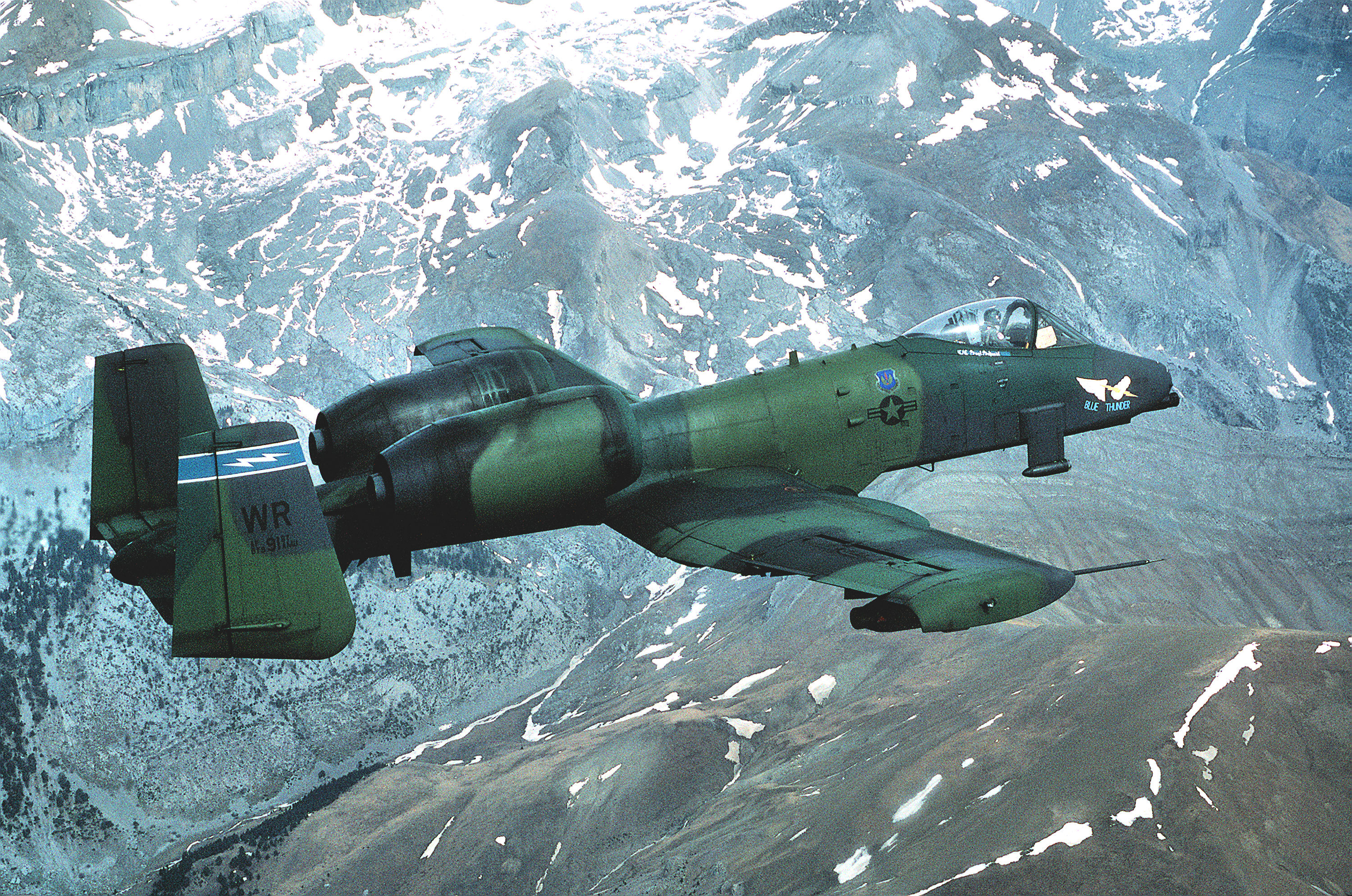
A 91st TFS A-10A in 1987 flying through the Pyrenees mountains between France and Spain.

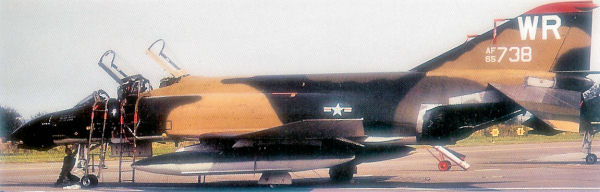
McDonnell F-4D-28-MC Phantom Serial No. 65-0738 of the 78th Tactical Fighter Squadron, September 1972. This aircraft was retired to AMARC on 13 June 1990.

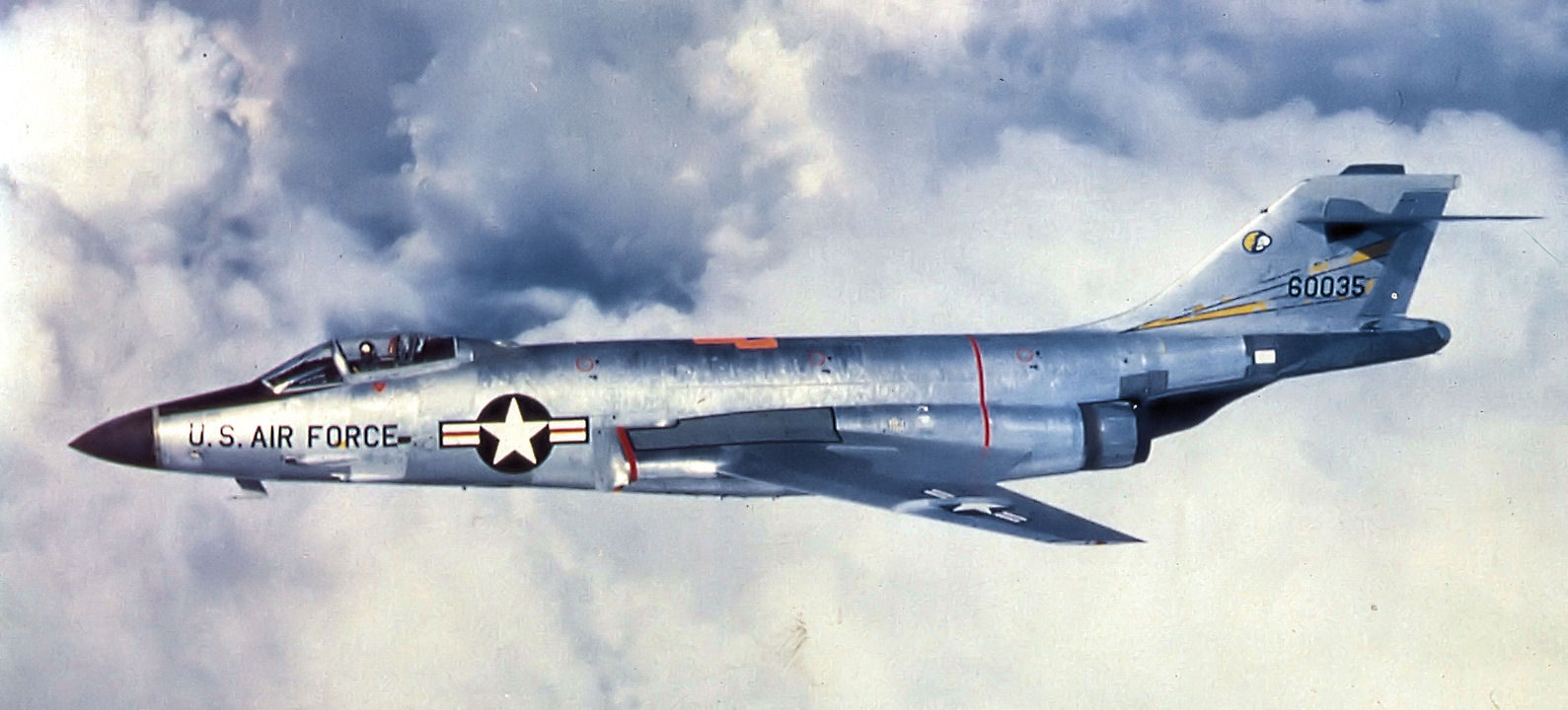
92d TFS F-101C Voodoo 56-035

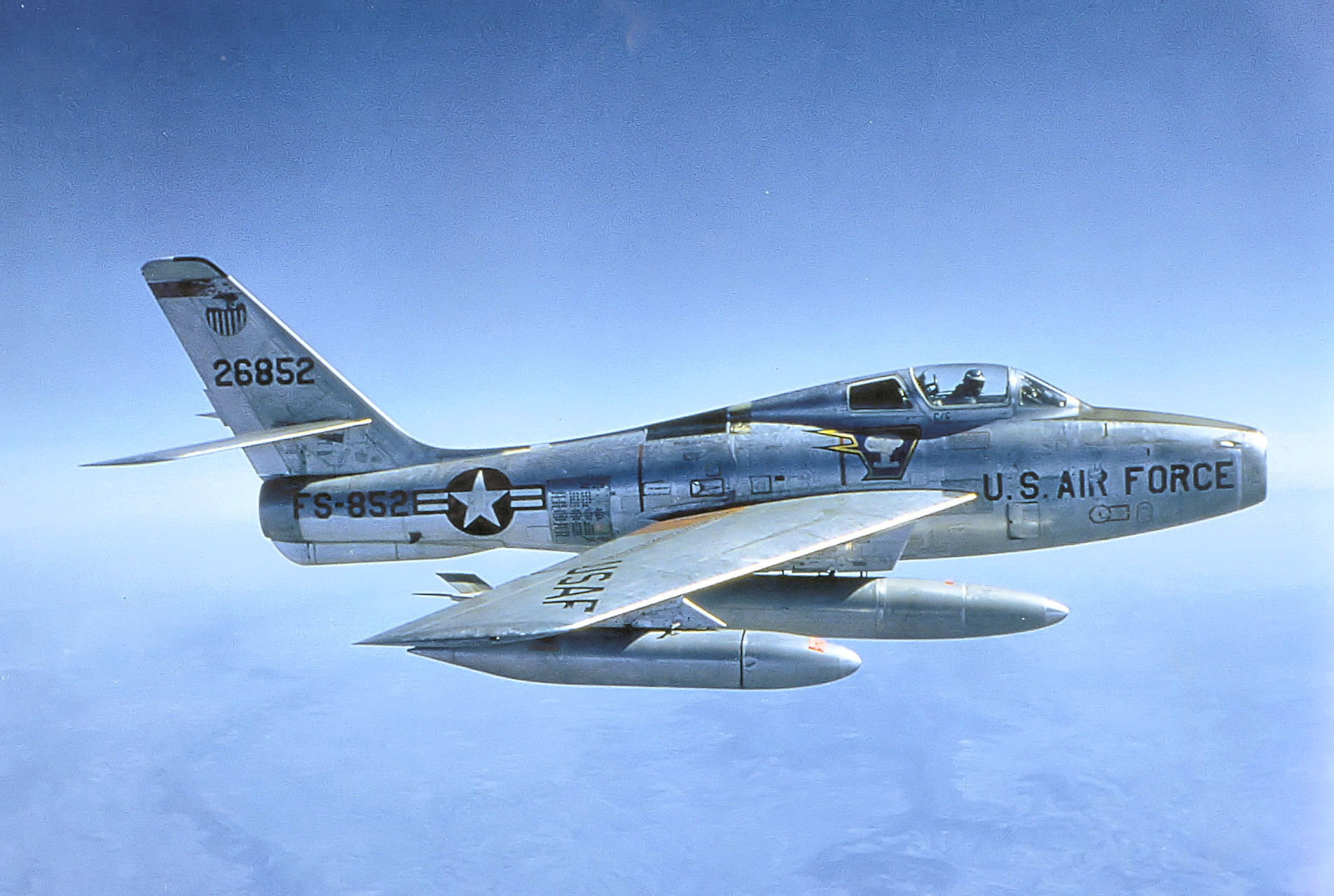
91st TFS F-84F 52-6852

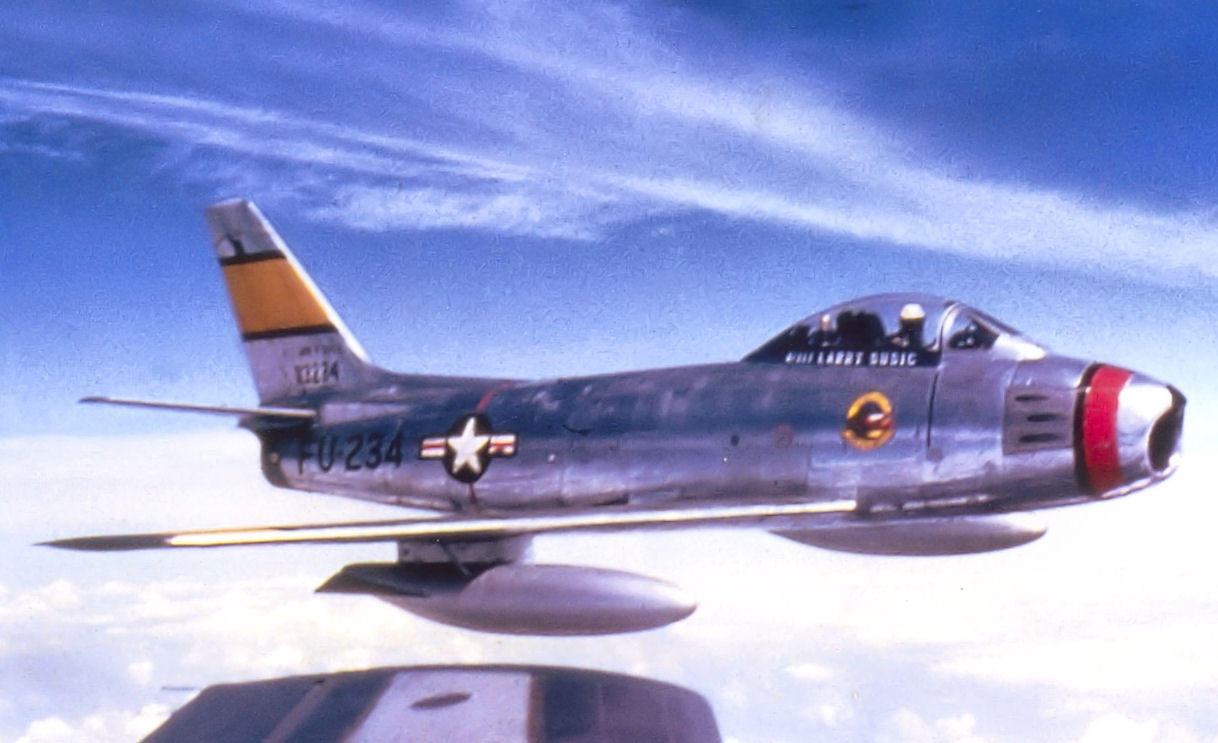
78th FBS North American F-86F Sabre - 51-13234

After fourteen months at now redesignated Larson Air Force Base, the 81st received movement orders to deploy to England. On 1 August 1951, the 81st flew initially into RAF Shepherds Grove, when in September transferred its headquarters to RAF Bentwaters, where the wing would be stationed for the next 40 years as part of the United States Air Forces in Europe (USAFE). The 81st Fighter-Bomber Group was inactivated on 16 June 1952 when the group was considered redundant as part of the Air Force tri-deputate reorganization.

The wing was the first Sabre Jet unit to be based in Europe, and the first to form an integral part of the peacetime air defense of Great Britain. To do this it was placed under British operational control. No. 11 Group RAF, RAF Fighter Command, commanded the wing for combined operational training and actual defense of the United Kingdom. Meanwhile its American higher authority was Third Air Force, U.S. Air Forces in Europe, which coordinated its activities with the RAF. Although the pilots had a relatively short time to acquaint themselves with RAF techniques and procedures and the methods of fighter control, the unit made an excellent showing. In November 1952 when the 116th Fighter-Interceptor Squadron was inactivated and returned to Washington state control, it was replaced by the 78th Fighter-Interceptor Squadron, which assumed its mission, personnel and equipment. The 78th moved to RAF Sculthorpe in May 1956. The 78th briefly returned to Shepherds Grove in May 1957 before being reassigned to RAF Woodbridge in December 1958 when the USAF turned Shepherds Grove over to the British Ministry of Defence.

In October 1954 the mission of the 81st changed from fighter-interceptor to fighter-bomber operations, carrying both conventional and nuclear weapons. The wing was charged with tactical operations in support of USAFE and NATO, with air defense as a secondary mission. To reflect this change, the unit was redesignated the 81st Fighter-Bomber Wing and traded in its North American F-86 Sabres for the Republic F-84F Thunderstreak.

On 8 July 1958 Bentwaters was operated as "twin base" with RAF Woodbridge and as a single unit under the newly designated 81st Tactical Fighter Wing. Along with the 91st and 92d Tactical Fighter Squadrons, the 78th Tactical Fighter Squadron was transferred from RAF Shepherds Grove when the USAF returned Shepherds Grove to the Ministry of Defence. The 78th TFS operated from Woodbrige, while the 91st and 92d squadrons operated from Bentwaters.

Beginning in the fall of 1958, the 81st TFW was reequipped with the McDonnell F-101 Voodoo. The F-101 was configured as a fighter bomber, intended to carry a single nuclear weapon for use against battlefield targets such as airfields. The Voodos were equipped with Low Angle Drogued Delivery and Low Altitude Bombing System equipment for its primary mission of delivering nuclear weapons at extremely low altitudes. Pilots were trained for one-way missions into Soviet territory to increase effective range at some cost in negating pilot recovery.

In November 1965, the 81st received McDonnell F-4 Phantom IIs to replace the Voodoos. Initially receiving the F-4C this was later upgraded to the more capable F-4D during late 1972 and 1973.

The 81st began conversion to the Fairchild Republic A-10 Thunderbolt II in June 1979. The A-10 being a single-seat, twin-engine jet aircraft designed to provide close air support (CAS) of ground forces by attacking tanks, armored vehicles, and other ground targets. With the A-10, the wing's mission changed to close air support and battlefield air interdiction in support of NATO ground forces.

This arrangement continued until June 1988 when the 10th Tactical Reconnaissance Wing at RAF Alconbury became a Tactical Fighter Wing, and two of the 81st TFW squadrons, the 509th and 511th Tactical Fighter Squadrons were transferred there on 1 June and 1 September, respectively. With the transfer of the A-10s to Alconbury, the 527th Aggressor Squadron was transferred to Bentwaters. The mission of the 527th was to provide dissimilar air combat training for NATO pilots, using Soviet tactics. The squadron flew the Northrop F-5 Freedom Fighter at Alconbury, however after 12 years of intense flying, by 1988 the fleet of aggressor F-5Es was getting rather worn out as a result of sustained exposure to the rigors of air combat maneuvering. It was decided to re-equip the squadron with General Dynamics F-16C Fighting Falcons when the squadron was assigned to Bentwaters.

The 527th Squadron flew its last F-5E sortie from Alconbury on 22 June 1988. On 14 July 1988 the squadron was transferred, transitioning to F-16Cs by mid-January 1989 at Bentwaters. However, in 1990 with the collapse of the Soviet Union, the decision was made to terminate the entire USAF aggressor program. The 527th AS was inactivated on 30 September 1990.

An A-10 forward operating location was established at Sembach Air Base West Germany on 1 September 1978 when Det. 1, 81st Tactical Fighter Wing was activated. Revetments and a dozen hardened aircraft shelters were built and A-10A Single-seat forward air control versions began operations at Sembach during May 1979. Additional detachments were subsequently established at Leipheim, Ahlhorn and Norvenich Air Bases and at two rear-ward Forward Operating Locations which remain classified to this day, in West Germany, believed to be Jever air base and Wiesbaden Army airfield. A-10s and support resources routinely rotated to these Forward Operating Locations from RAF Bentwaters for training and Tactical Evaluations. In the event of war in the 1980s, the Bentwater A-10s were to fight from Germany, and Bentwaters would host F-16s from Nellis Air Force Base and A-10s from Myrtle Beach Air Force Base, South Carolina.

With the end of the Cold War, the USAF presence at Bentwaters was gradually phased down. It was announced that the base would be closed and the 81st TFW would be inactivated. Began preparation for base closure in December 1992, ending flying operations on 1 April 1993. The last A-10 aircraft departed Bentwaters on 23 March 1993, and the 81st Tactical Fighter Wing was inactivated on 1 July 1993.

=== Air Education and Training Command ===
The 81st Training Wing replaced Keesler Training Center in July 1993, taking on the mission of specialized technical training in electronics, avionics, computers, operations, maintenance, and personnel and information management for Air Force, Air Force Reserve Command, Air National Guard, other Department of Defense agencies, and foreign nations.

=== Hurricane Katrina ===
29 August 2005 tested the resolve of the 81st Training Wing in as drastic a manner as imaginable. When Hurricane Katrina barrelled into the gulf coast as a category 4 storm, the eye was only approximately 30 miles off a head-on hit with Keesler Air Force Base. Because of the hurricane, all students and non-essential personnel of the 81st were evacuated to other Air Force bases, effectively shutting down the training wing. Operation Dragon Comeback, the monumental relief and recovery mission the Air Force initiated, saw over $950 million in damage just to the base, but some 8,500 volunteers from Keesler helped not only the air base but also the surrounding communities get back to some semblance of normalcy after this disaster. The title "Operation Dragon Comeback" was coined by Master Sergeant Terence J. Scott (Retired Firefighter from the 81st Civil Engineer Squadron).

It only took until 16 September 2005 for students to start coming back to Kessler to train for their Air Force careers. In less than a month, Keesler managed to clean up, pump out, dig through, and resuscitate the ailing training wing and bring it back to full mission readiness.

== Lineage ==
- Established as the 81st Fighter Wing on 15 April 1948

Activated on 1 May 1948
Redesignated: 81st Fighter-Interceptor Wing on 20 January 1950
Redesignated: 81st Fighter-Bomber Wing on 1 April 1954
Redesignated: 81st Tactical Fighter Wing on 8 July 1958
Inactivated on 1 July 1993

- Redesignated 81st Training Wing, and activated, on 1 July 1993

=== Assignments ===
- 7th Air Division, 1 May 1948
- Pacific Air Command, 3 September 1948
- Twelfth Air Force, 21 May 1949 (attached to Western Air Defense Force after 10 November 1949)
- Fourth Air Force, 1 April 1950 (remained attached to Western Air Defense Force to 1 August 1950)
- Western Air Defense Force, 1 August 1950 (attached to Third Air Force, 5 – 8 September 1951)
- Third Air Force, 9 September 1951 (attached to 49th Air Division, 1 March 1954 – 1 July 1956
- Seventeenth Air Force, 1 July 1961
- Third Air Force, 1 September 1963 – 1 July 1993
- Second Air Force, 1 July 1993 – present

=== Stations ===
- Wheeler Air Force Base, Hawaii, 15 April 1948 – 21 May 1949
- Camp Stoneman, California, 27 May 1949
- Kirtland Air Force Base, New Mexico, 5 June 1949
- Moses Lake Air Force Base (later Larson Air Force Base), Washington, 2 May 1950 – 16 August 1951
- Bentwaters RAF Station (later RAF Bentwaters), England, 6 September 1951 – 1 July 1993; (RAF Woodbridge, England ["Twin Base" with RAF Bentwaters], 8 July 1958 – 1 February 1980)
- Keesler Air Force Base, Mississippi, 1 July 1993 – present

=== Components ===
Groups:

- 81st Fighter Group (later 81st Fighter-Interceptor Group, 81st Fighter-Bomber Group), 1 May 1948 – 8 February 1955

Squadrons:

- 78th Fighter-Bomber Squadron (later 78th Tactical Fighter Squadron), Attached c. 22 April 1954 – 7 February 1955, assigned 8 February 1955 – 1 May 1992
- 91st Fighter-Bomber Squadron (later 91st Tactical Fighter Squadron), Attached c. 22 April 1954 – 7 February 1955, assigned 8 February 1955 – 1 May 1992
- 92d Fighter-Bomber Squadron (later 92d Tactical Fighter Squadron), Attached c. 22 April 1954 – 7 February 1955, assigned 8 February 1955 – 1 May 1992
- 116th Fighter Squadron (later 116th Fighter-Interceptor Squadron, Attached 10 February 1951 – 9 August 1951 (further attached to 81st Fighter-Interceptor Group)
- 509th Tactical Fighter Squadron: 1 October 1979 – 1 June 1988
- 510th Tactical Fighter Squadron: 1 October 1978 – 1 October 1992
- 511th Tactical Fighter Squadron: 1 January 1980 – 1 September 1988
- 527th Aggressor Squadron: 14 July 1988 – 30 September 1990

=== Aircraft ===
- Republic F-47 Thunderbolt, 1948–1949
- Lockheed F-80 Shooting Star, 1949
- North American F-86 Sabre, 1949–1955
- North American F-51 Mustang, 1951
- Republic F-84F Thunderstreak, 1954–1959
- McDonnell F-101 Voodoo, 1958–1966
- McDonnell F-4 Phantom II, 1965–1979
- Fairchild Republic A-10 Thunderbolt II, 1978–1993
- General Dynamics F-16C Fighting Falcon, 1988–1990
