= Huxian Airport =

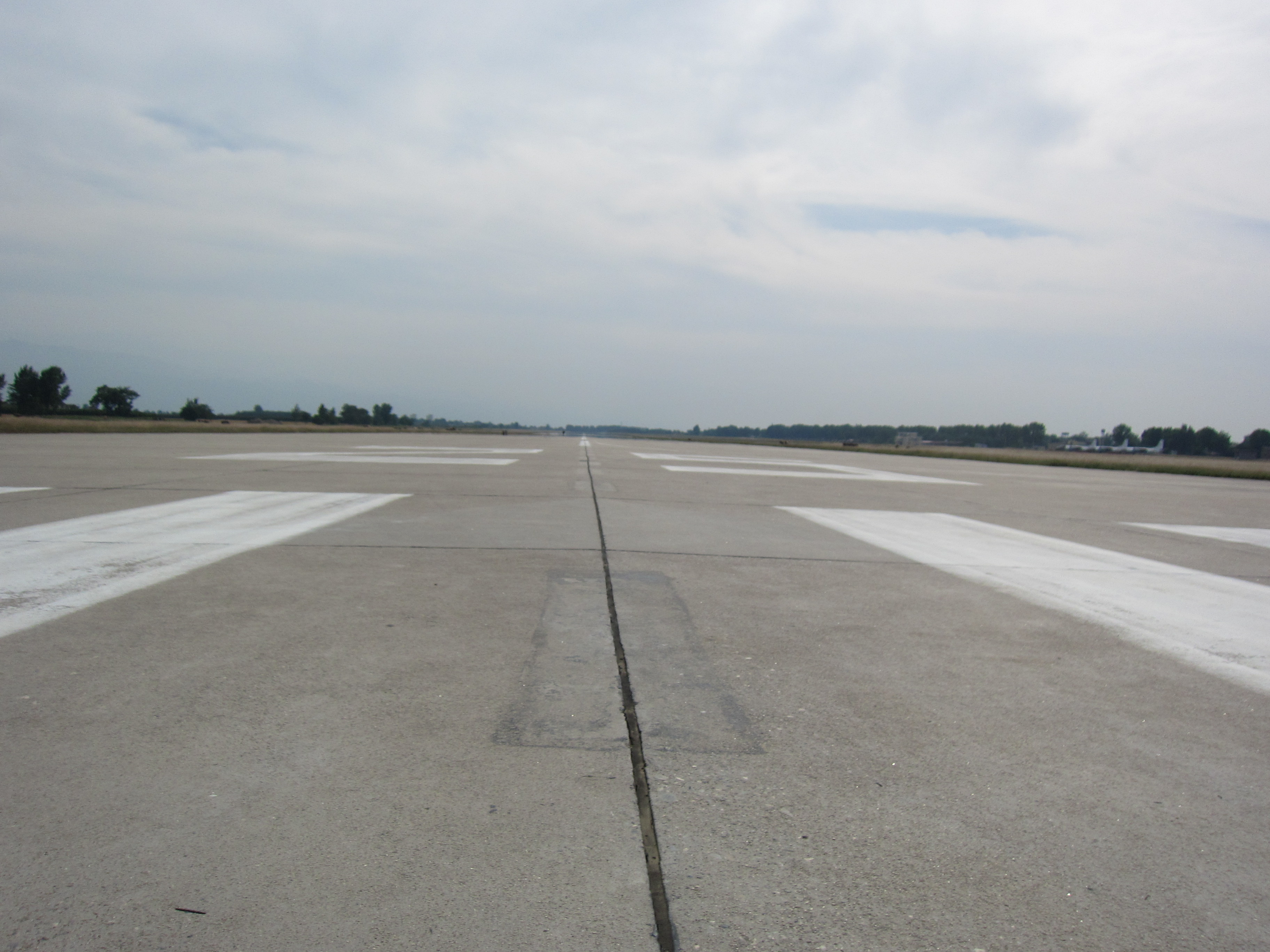
- The runway of the airport
- IATA: none; ICAO: none

Summary
- Airport type: Undetermined
- Serves: Xi'an
- Location: Huyi District, Xi'an, China
- Coordinates: 34°09′10″N 108°35′59″E

Map

Runways
Direction	Length		Surface
Direction	ft	m	Surface
08/26	2,272	3,030	Concrete

Huxian Airport is an airport located in Huyi District, Xi'an, Shaanxi Province, China.

== History ==
During World War II, the airport was known as Huhsien (Yuehhsien) Airfield and was used by the United States Army Air Forces Fourteenth Air Force as part of the China Defensive Campaign (1942–1945). People's Liberation Army Air Force (PLAAF) use the airport as a military base - Xi'an Air Base.
