= Médiouna Airfield =

Abandoned military airfield in Morocco

Médiouna Airfield
- Part of Twelfth Air Force

Site information
- Type: Military airfield
- Controlled by: United States Army Air Forces

Location
- Coordinates: 33°32′58.09″N 007°33′46.33″W

Site history
- Built: 1942
- In use: 1942-1943

Location of Médiouna Airfield, Morocco

Médiouna Airfield is an abandoned military airfield in Morocco, located in the Casablanca area.

== History ==
Established as a French military airfield in French Morocco during the 1920s, after the Fall of France in June, 1940, the reconstituted Vichy Air Force established a military airfield at the facility for its limited air resources. During the Operation Torch landings in November 1942, 13 United States Navy F-4F Wildcats attacked the airfield at Médiouna and destroyed a total of 11 French aircraft, including six from GC II/5. and the airfield was seized by invading Allied ground forces.

Immediately after the landings, the United States Army Air Force Twelfth Air Force 47th Bombardment Group became the first USAAF A-20 Havoc group to participate in large-scale combat in the North African Campaign, using ferry tanks cross the North Atlantic. The group assembled at Médiouna before flying its first combat mission from Youks-les-Bains Airfield, Algeria on 13 December.

On the heels of the 47th, the B-25 Mitchell equipped 310th Bombardment Group moved from its temporary base at RAF Hardwick, England in mid-November. It also moved east quickly to Telergma Airfield, Algeria on 21 December.

A third group, the 81st Fighter Group was assigned to the field in early January 1943 flying P-39 Airacobras. Its ground echelon arrived at the field in November, but the air echelon trained for several months in England. Once assembled, it moved to Thelepte Airfield, Tunisia at the end of January.

The next USAAF unit to use Médiouna was the P-38 Lightning 14th Fighter Group, after being withdrawn from combat in early March 1943. The group was re-equipped with the P-38F and some P-38Gs and reassigned to Telergma Airfield, Algeria in early May. Lastly, elements of the 86th Bombardment Group (309th, 310th, 312th Bombardment Squadrons) were at the airfield between 15 May and 11 June 1944.

Following the landings in Algeria and Morocco, the French Armée d'Afrique freed itself from Vichy France and joined the Allies against the Axis forces. The Cherchell-Mediouna French Cadet Officers Academy was established at the airfield in December 1942 in order to provide the Free French Forces with officers. Most of the officers from the Cherchell-Mediouna E.E.A. were trained in Cherchell (Algeria). The Mediouna camp, near Casablanca (Morocco), accommodated cadet officers only between January and May 1943. From January 1943 to June 1945, about 5,000 officers divided into five classes were trained in the Cherchell-Mediouna E.E.A..
