= Le Kouif Airfield =

Le Kouif Airfield
- Part of Twelfth Air Force

Site information
- Type: Military airfield
- Controlled by: United States Army Air Forces

Location
- Coordinates: 35°31′01.52″N 008°18′39.57″E

Site history
- Built: 1942
- In use: 1942-1943

Location of Le Kouif Airfield, Algeria

Le Kouif Airfield was a World War II military airfield in Algeria, located near the town of El Kouif, in Annaba province, approximately 180 km southeast of Constantine. During World War II it was used by the United States Army Air Force Twelfth Air Force 81st Fighter Group during the North African Campaign against the German Afrika Korps in February and March 1943.

== History ==
It was a temporary airfield constructed by Army Engineers using compacted earth for its runway, parking and dispersal areas. It was not designed for heavy aircraft or for long term use. The prevailing temperatures in the area are some of the hottest in the world, making steel planking unsuitable for airfield use.

After World War II, flights from Le Kouif connected travelers to Tébessa and Annaba. In 1957, a new landing strip was inaugurated. The airfield was heavily used by the Compagnie des Phosphates de Constantine.

Once the 81st moved east into Tunisia, the airfield was dismantled by Army engineers. Today, the remains of its runway can be seen in aerial photography, but otherwise, nothing remains of the facility.
