= RAF Bentwaters =

Former Royal Air Force station in Suffolk, England

RAF Bentwaters
- Near Rendlesham, Suffolk in England
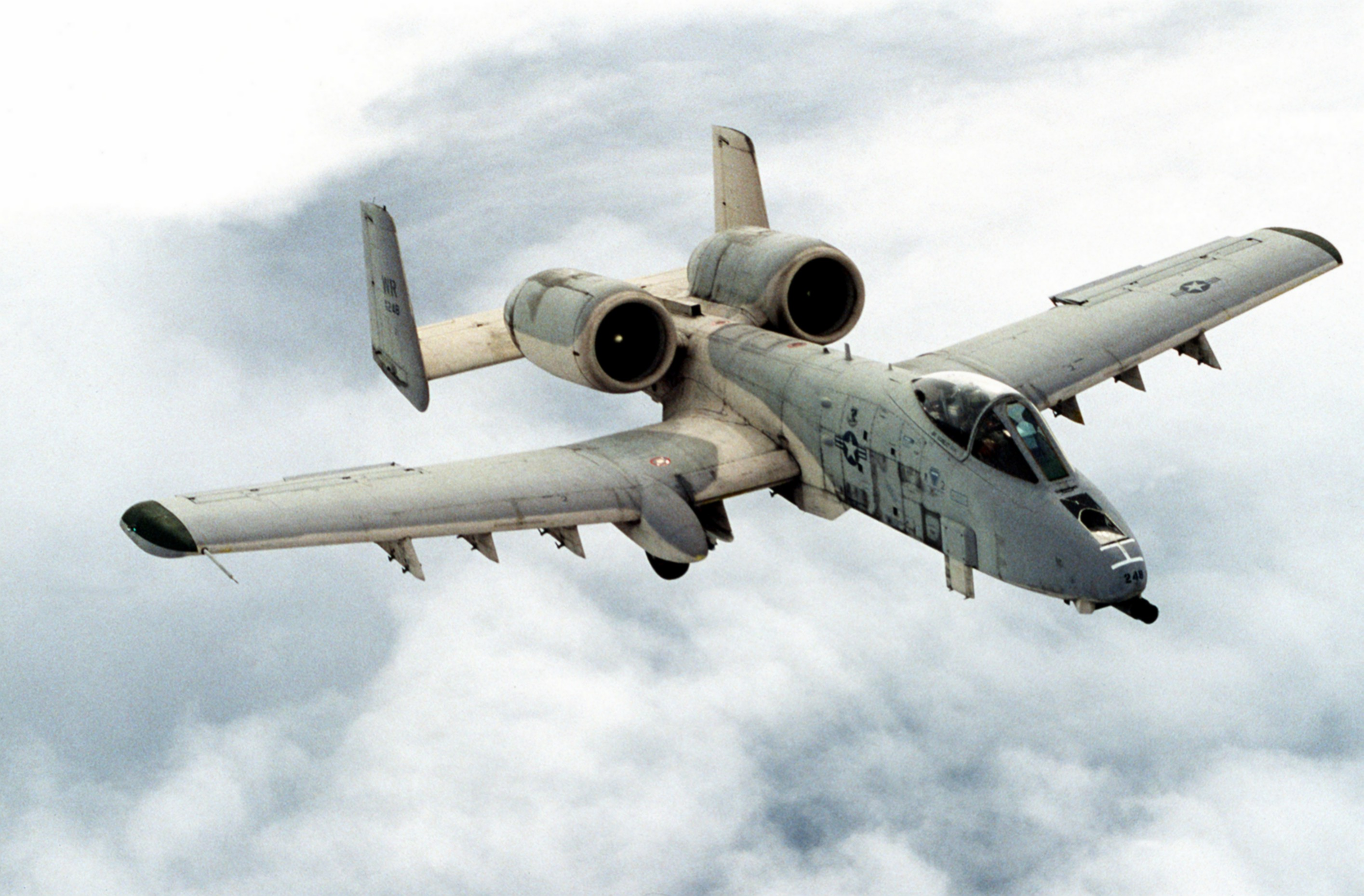
- A Fairchild Republic A-10A Thunderbolt II assigned to the 81st Tactical Fighter Wing, which was based at RAF Bentwaters between 1951 and 1993.

Site information
- Type: Royal Air Force station
- Code: BY
- Owner: Ministry of Defence
- Operator: Royal Air Force (1942–1949); United States Air Force (1951–1993)
- Controlled by: RAF Bomber Command 1944; RAF Fighter Command 1944- * No. 11 Group RAF
- Condition: Closed

Location
- Location in Suffolk RAF Bentwaters (the United Kingdom)
- Coordinates: 52°07′41″N 001°26′07″E
- Grid reference: TM350530

Site history
- Built: 1941/44
- In use: April 1944–1993
- Fate: Site sold and became a business park and TV/film location known as Bentwaters Parks with airfield infrastructure and buildings remaining.; Bentwaters Cold War Museum opened in 2007.
- Events: European theatre of World War II; Cold War

Airfield information
- Identifiers: IATA: BWY, ICAO: EGVJ, WMO: 035963
- Elevation: 80 feet (24 m) AMSL
Runways
Direction	Length and surface
07/25	2,725 metres (8,940 ft) Concrete
00/00 Wartime	Concrete/Tarmac
00/00 Wartime	Concrete/Tarmac

Royal Air Force Bentwaters or more simply RAF Bentwaters now known as Bentwaters Parks, is a former Royal Air Force station located 10 miles (16 km) east-northeast of Ipswich, near Woodbridge, Suffolk in England. Its name was taken from two cottages ('Bentwaters Cottages') that had stood on the site of the main runway during its construction in 1943.

The station was used by the Royal Air Force (RAF) during the Second World War, and by the United States Air Force (USAF) during the Cold War, being the primary home for the 81st Fighter Wing under various designations from 1951 to 1993. For many years the 81st Fighter Wing also operated RAF Woodbridge, with Bentwaters and Woodbridge airfields being known by the Americans as the "Twin Bases".

RAF Bentwaters was the location of an 13–14 August 1956 nighttime radar and visual sighting of multiple UFOs (the Lakenheath-Bentwaters incident); it is also near the location of the alleged December 1980 UFO incident in Rendlesham Forest.

The site is now known as Bentwaters Parks. The Bentwaters Cold War Museum is located on the site, there are offices and warehouses, and the site is also used for television and film making.

== History ==
=== Second World War ===
Bentwaters airfield's origin dates to 1942 when construction began on a Royal Air Force station called Royal Air Force Butley for use by RAF Bomber Command. On 28 January 1943 the station was renamed Royal Air Force Bentwaters. It was opened for operational use in April 1944. In December it was transferred to No. 11 Group, RAF Fighter Command . During the Second World War, RAF squadrons at Bentwaters were:

- No. 64 Squadron RAF between 29 December 1944 and 15 August 1945 with North American Mustang III moved to RAF Horsham St Faith.
- No. 65 Squadron RAF between 15 May 1945 and 13 August 1945 with Mustang IV moved to RAF Fairwood Common.
- No. 118 Squadron RAF between 15 December 1944 and 11 August 1945 with re-equipped Mustang III moved to RAF Fairwood Common.
- No. 126 Squadron RAF between 30 December 1944 and 5 September 1945 with Mustang III then upgrading to Mustang IV in August 1945.
- No. 129 Squadron RAF between 11 December 1944 and 26 May 1945 with Mustang III, swapping to Supermarine Spitfire IXE in May 1945.
- No. 165 Squadron RAF between 15 December 1944 and 29 May 1945 with Mustang III until May 1945 then the Spitfire IXE.
- No. 234 Squadron RAF (1944–45)
- No. 245 Squadron RAF

Other units also based at Bentwaters include No. 226 Operational Conversion Unit RAF and No. 7 Fighter Command Servicing Unit.

- No. 2707 Squadron RAF Regiment.
- No. 2791 Squadron RAF Regiment.
- No. 2839 Squadron RAF Regiment.

=== Post-war RAF use (1945-46) ===
- No. 56 Squadron RAF reformed here on 1 April 1946 and stayed until 16 September 1946 with the Gloster Meteor F.3 moving to RAF Boxted.
- No. 74 Squadron RAF between 2 June 1946 and 9 June 1945 with Meteor F.3s moved to RAF Colerne.
- No. 124 Squadron RAF between 5 October 1945 and 18 February 1946 with Meteor F.3s moving to RAF Fairwood Common. The squadron returned on 20 March 1946 and stayed until 1 April 1946 still with the Meteor F.3 before being renamed 56 Squadron.

=== USAF use (1951-1993) ===
Control of Bentwaters was transferred to the United States Air Force on 16 March 1951 by the Ministry of Defence, and the United States Air Forces in Europe (USAFE) designated it a primary installation of HQ USAFE on 7 September 1951. Bentwaters was to play a key role in the defence of Western Europe during the Cold War when large numbers of USAF aircraft were assigned as part of the air arm of NATO.

On 16 March 1951, the USAF 7506th Air Support Group was assigned to Bentwaters. Their mission was to bring the facility up to NATO standards. During most of 1951 and 1952 USAF construction upgraded the operational facilities, as well as the construction of support facilities. Early USAF units at Bentwaters were as follows:

- 9th Air Rescue Squadron (July 1951 – November 1952) (Boeing SB-29 'Super Dumbo'). This unit flew air-sea rescue missions with aging B-29 aircraft adapted to drop airborne lifeboats. It received its nickname from earlier "Dumbo" missions that picked airmen up when they crashed at sea. The unit departed in November 1952 for RAF Burtonwood.
- 7554th Target Tow Flight (March–December 1952) (Stinson L-5E, Douglas TB-26C). This unit flew aerial targets for gunnery practice by NATO aircraft.

==== 81st Tactical Fighter Wing ====
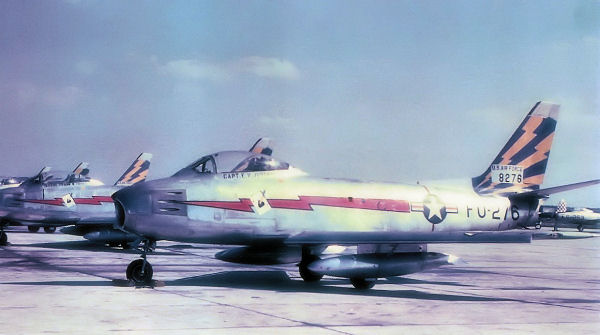
North American F-86A-5-NA Sabre, AF Serial No. 48-0276 of the 116th Fighter-Interceptor Squadron

The 81st Fighter-Interceptor Wing became the new host unit at Bentwaters in September 1951. The 81st, in various designations, remained at RAF Bentwaters for over 40 years during the Cold War era. The 81st FIW was a North American F-86A Sabre equipped unit, being activated at Moses Lake AFB, Washington in May 1950. In August 1951 the 81st flew initially into RAF Shepherds Grove, then in September transferred its headquarters to RAF Bentwaters.

In early 1965, the 81st began operating F-4D Phantoms. This would continue through early 1979, when the wing received and began operating the A-10A Thunderbolt II single-seat attack aircraft, affectionately known as the Warthog. The D model Phantoms were transferred to the 401st TFW at Torrejón AB, Spain.

An A-10 Forward Operating Location (FOL) was established at Sembach Air Base, West Germany on 1 September 1978 when Det. "1, 81st Tactical Fighter Wing was activated. Revetments and a dozen hardened aircraft shelters were built and A-10A's began operations at Sembach during May 1979. Additional detachments were subsequently established at Leipheim, Alhorn and Norvenich Air Bases in West Germany and at two additional unmanned reserve FOLs which remain classified; one in the north of Germany and one in the south, both in rear of the other four named bases/airfields. A-10's and support resources routinely rotated to these FOLs from RAF Bentwaters for training and Tactical Evaluations. The C-130 rotating to the detachments was affectionately called "The Klong". In the event of war in the 1980s, the Bentwater A-10's were to fight from Germany, and Bentwaters would host F-16's from Nellis AFB and from Myrtle Beach AFB, South Carolina.

==== Post Cold War ====
With the end of the Cold War, the USAF presence at Bentwaters was gradually phased down. It was announced that the station would be closed and the 81st TFW would be inactivated. The Bentwaters-based squadrons were phased-down as follows:

- 510th Tactical Fighter Squadron was transferred to the 52nd Fighter Wing at Spangdahlem Air Base in Germany on 4 January 1993. On 1 February 1994 it was inactivated at Spangdahlem, but it was reactivated on 23 March 1994 as a Block 40 F-16C/D squadron at Aviano Air Base in Italy.
- 92nd Tactical Fighter Squadron was inactivated on 31 March 1993. Its aircraft were sent back to the United States to various Air National Guard squadrons.

The last A-10 aircraft departed Bentwaters on 23 March 1993, and the 81st Tactical Fighter Wing was inactivated on 1 July 1993. With the inactivation, the USAF returned control of Bentwaters to the Ministry of Defence.

Currently, Bentwaters airfield is inactive as a military facility.

== Current uses ==
With the handover of Bentwaters back to the UK Ministry of Defence in 1993, the facility was closed. It is now known as "Bentwaters Parks".

=== Bentwaters Cold War Museum ===
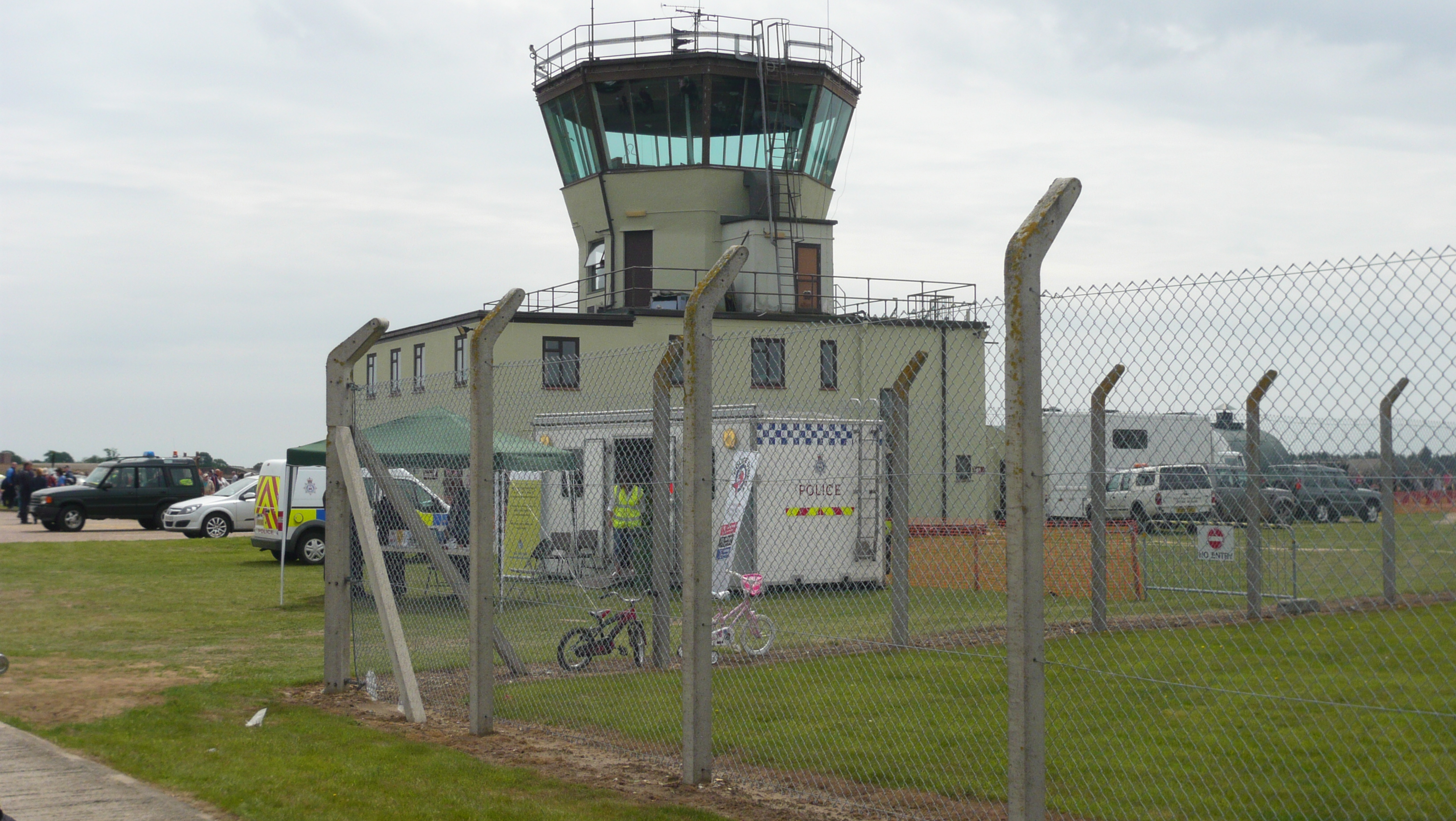
The ATC tower at the former RAF Bentwaters

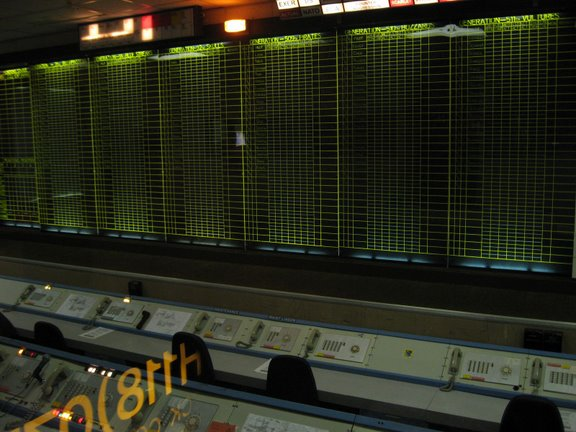
War Operation Room

In 2003, work commenced on the Bentwaters Cold War Museum (BCWM).

The museum is based in the former USAF hardened command post on the airfield. The main "war operations room" and "Battle cabin" have been restored to original condition, the BT telephone exchange room, and decontamination showers and airlock are also as original.

Other rooms within the building have been turned into exhibition rooms, covering the history of RAF Bentwaters from WWII until the base closed.

The museum is currently undergoing refurbishment as of May 2022.

=== Private Tractor Museum ===
Bill Kemball, from Suffolk, moved his large collection of tractors and other equipment to a building on the site. As of October 2023, the museum is only available to visit by appointment, but plans are being made to make it more available to visit.

=== Television and media ===
The 2005 reality television series Space Cadets was largely shot at RAF Bentwaters. The base was disguised as a Russian spaceport to maintain the illusion that the contestants were in fact in Russia preparing for their mission in space.

In 2008 an episode of the History Channel's UFO Hunters entitled "Military vs. UFOs", was aired. The episode focused on RAF Bentwaters' 1956 and 1980 UFO incidents.

The 2021 James Nunn action movie One Shot, set on an Eastern European prison island, was filmed at Bentwaters.

== See also ==
- List of former Royal Air Force stations
