= Youks-les-Bains Airfield =

Abandoned military airfield in Algeria

Youks-les-Bains Airfield
- Part of Twelfth Air Force

Site information
- Type: Military airfield
- Controlled by: United States Army Air Forces

Location
- Coordinates: 35°29′50.83″N 007°55′43.76″E

Site history
- Built: 1942
- In use: 1942-1943

Location of Youks-les-Bains Airfield, Algeria

Youks-les-Bains Airfield is an abandoned military airfield in Algeria, located about 20 km northwest of Tebessa. The airfield today consists of several agricultural fields, with the faint remains of its main runway, parts of a taxiway and a few aircraft dispersal hardstands visible in aerial photography.

== History ==
The facility was built as a civilian airport, probably during the 1930s. During the World War II 1940 Battle of France, the French Air Force GB II/11 flew across the Mediterranean with 14 Lioré et Olivier LeO 45 medium bombers, arriving on 21 June. From Youks-les-Bains, the squadron attacked Italian forces at Palermo, Sicily on 23 and 24 June, before the Armistice with Nazi Germany and Italy took place on 25 June. After the armistice, Youks-les-Bains became a base for the limited Vichy French Air Force (French: Armée de l'Air de Vichy) allowed by the Germans.

As part of the North African Campaign, on 15 November 1942, thirty-three C-47 Skytrain transports dropped three hundred men of the United States Army 2nd Battalion, 509th Parachute Regiment on Youks-les-Bains airfield during the initial attacks on occupied Tunisia by the Tunisian Task Force. As the planes carrying the 509th approached the airfield, soldiers were seen in the trenches around the field. There were several anxious moments as the paratroopers started their jump, not knowing whether the troops below were French or German. Upon reaching the ground, the Americans found a poorly equipped, but friendly and helpful, unit of the French Army in possession of the area.

Once in Allied hands, the airfield became a major United States Army Air Force Twelfth Air Force base of operations against the German Afrika Korps. Known units assigned to Youks-les-Bains were:

- 47th Bombardment Group, 7 January-6 March 1943, A-20 Havoc
- 14th Fighter Group, 22 November 1942 – 9 January 1943, P-38 Lightning
- 31st Fighter Group, 21–25 February 1943, Spitfire
- 33d Fighter Group, 8–20 February 1943, P-40 Warhawk
- 52d Fighter Group, 9 March-14 April 1943, Spitfire
- 81st Fighter Group, 22–24 February 1943, P-39 Airacobra
- 15th Bombardment Squadron (Twelfth Air Force), 22 December 1942-February 1943 A-20 Havoc
- 154th Observation Squadron (68th Observation Group), 21 January-13 March 1943 (F-4 (P-38) Lightning)

By the end of the Battle of Tunisia, the Twelfth Air Force units had moved east and the Allied use of the airfield was reduced to a skeleton stationkeeping unit, being used as an emergency landing field for Air Transport Command units flying between Tunis and Algiers. It was abandoned by the American forces after the end of the European War during the summer of 1945.
