= Thelepte Airfield =

World War II military airfield in Tunisia

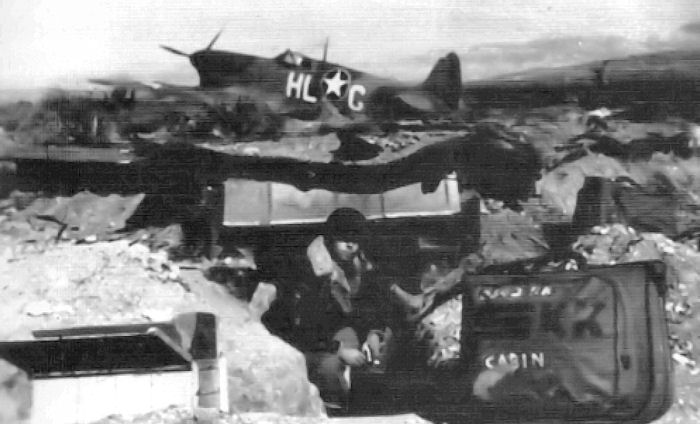
- Living conditions at Thelepte Airfield during the North African Campaign, 1943. Aircraft in background is USAAF Twelfth Air Force 31st Fighter Group, Spitfire Mk VB, 308th Fighter Squadron

Location
- Coordinates: 35°00′14.90″N 008°35′37.21″E

Site history
- Built: 1943

Location of Thelepte Airfield, Tunisia

Thelepte Airfield is an airfield in Tunisia, located about 20 km southwest of Kasserine. It currently is active and in use.

It was used by the United States Army Air Force Twelfth Air Force in 1943 during the North African Campaign against the German Afrika Korps. The first American units arrived in late December and the P-40s of the 33d Fighter Group arrived on 7 January from Telergma Airfield, Algeria.

Thelepte was used by the following units during the Battle of Tunisia:

- HQ, 64th Fighter Wing, 1–18 March 1943
- 47th Bombardment Group, 30 March-13 April 1943, A-20 Havoc
- 31st Fighter Group, 7–18 February 1943, Spitfire
- 33d Fighter Group, 7 January-8 February 1943, P-40 Warhawk
- 81st Fighter Group, 22 January-18 February 1943, P-39 Airacobra

On 18 February, the 31st and 81st Fighter Groups had to withdraw from the airfield after the Afrika Korps came within a few miles of the airfield. However American counter-attacks drove the Germans east and the airfield was re-manned on 1 March, later hosting A-20 Havocs until mid-April, when the combat was focused around Tunis and the units moved east to be closer to enemy targets, ending American use of the airfield.

Today, a single east–west runway (10/23) is active and well maintained. No structures are visible on aerial photography, however the area is fenced with restricted entry. A portion of a wartime NE/SW runway still exists. It is unclear what the present use (military/civilian) is.
