= 381st Bombardment Squadron =

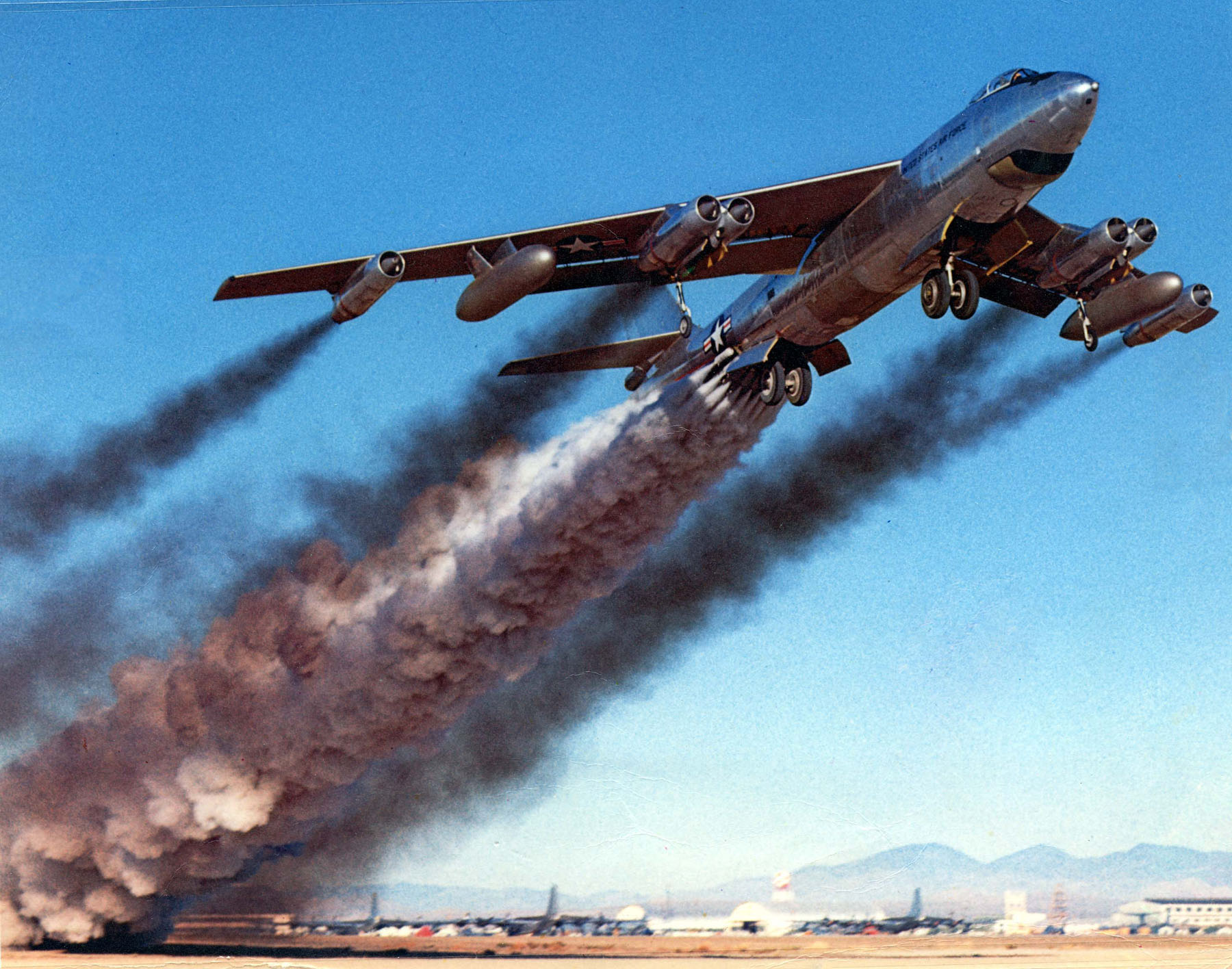
- B-47 Stratojet rocket-assisted takeoff
- Active: 1942-1945; 1947-1949; 1952-1965
- Country: United States
- Branch: United States Air Force
- Role: medium bomber
- Engagements: Mediterranean Theater of Operations
- Decorations: Distinguished Unit Citation; Air Force Outstanding Unit Award

Insignia
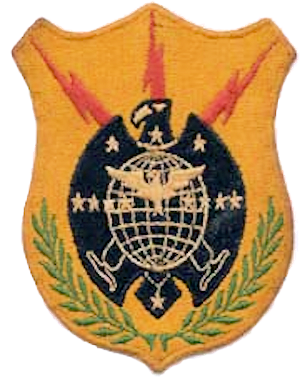
- 381st Bombardment Squadron emblem (Note: Approved 7 March 1956. Description: On an Air Force yellow shield, a stylized black eagle, on his breast an outlined sphere with longitude and latitude lines, on the sphere a stylized dove and twelve stars, grouped three, eight and one, all white; above the eagle three red lightning bolts radiating in chief, below the eagle two branches of olive each with thirteen leaves green.)

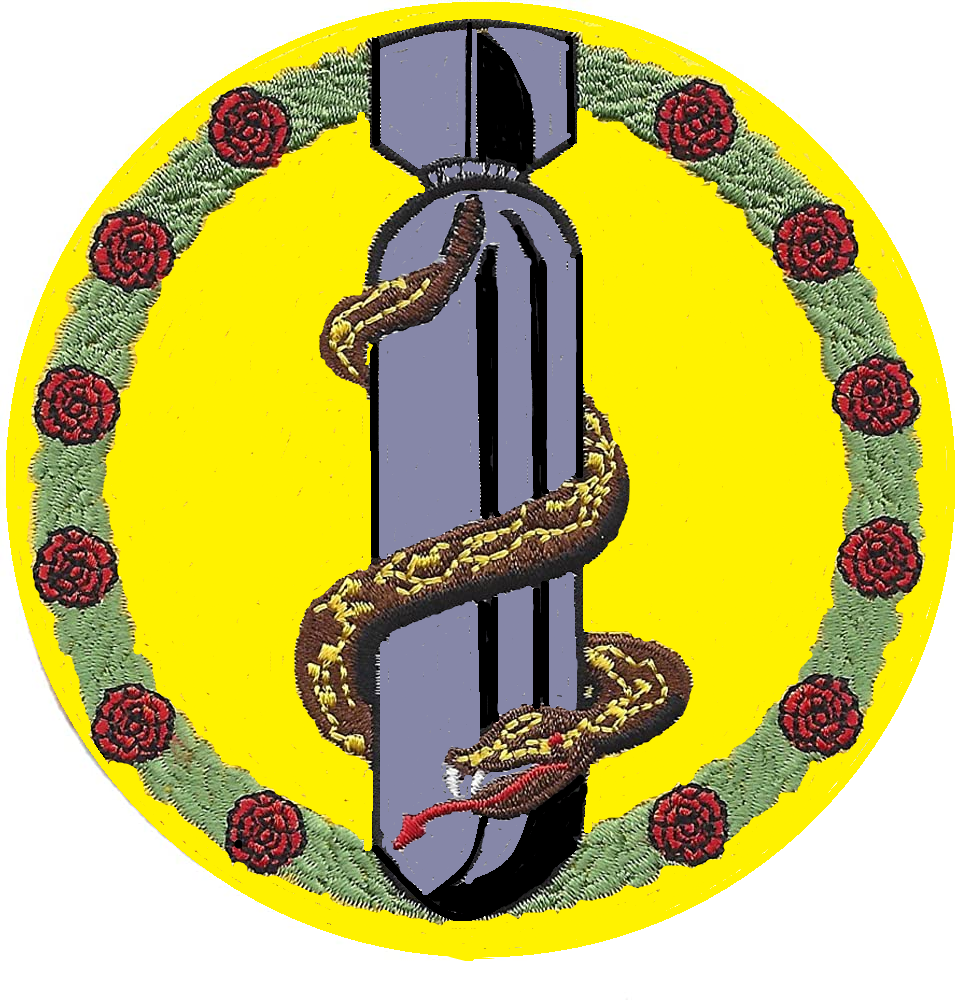
- 381 Bombardment Sq emblem (World War II)

The 381st Bombardment Squadron is an inactive United States Air Force unit. It was last assigned to the 310th Bombardment Wing at Schilling Air Force Base, Kansas, where it was inactivated on 25 March 1965.

The squadron was organized in March 1942 and trained in the Southeastern United States with North American B-25 Mitchells. In September, the air echelon of the unit moved to the United Kingdom in preparation for Operation Torch, the allied invasion of North Africa. In November, the squadron was reunited in French Morocco. It continued in combat in the Mediterranean Theater of Operations until V-E Day, earning two Distinguished Unit Citations. It was inactivated in September 1945 in Italy.

From 1947 to 1949, the squadron was active in the reserve, but does not appear to have been fully manned or equipped with operational aircraft during this time. It was activated again in March 1952, and operated Boeing B-47 Stratojets until inactivating at the end of 1965 as the B-47 was withdrawn from service.

== History ==
=== World War II ===
==== Initial organization and training ====
The squadron was activated at Davis-Monthan Field in March 1942 as the 381st Bombardment Squadron, one of the four original squadrons of the 310th Bombardment Group. It moved the same day to Jackson Army Air Base, Mississippi, where it began training with North American B-25 Mitchells. A portion of the ground echelon sailed for the United Kingdom aboard the RMS Queen Mary on 5 September 1942, (Note: Freeman refers to this as the air echelon on page 265, but contradicts this on page 15, which has more detail on the 310th Group's time in England.) while the remainder sailed directly for North Africa from the United States. The air echelon ferried the squadron's Mitchells via the North Atlantic ferry route, but bad weather delayed their movement, with the bombers arriving at RAF Hardwick between October and December 1942.

==== Combat in the Mediterranean theater ====
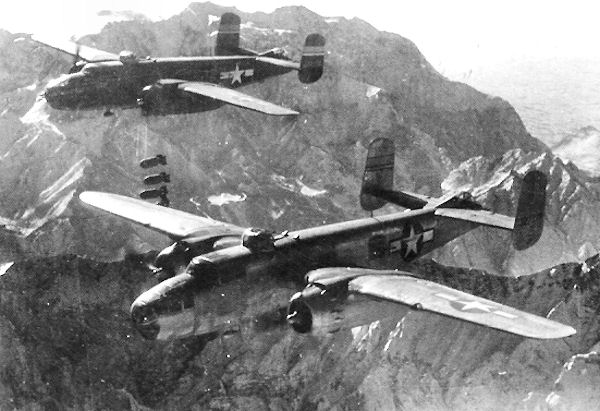
B-25 Mitchells of the 310th Bombardment Group attacking the Brenner Pass in 1944

In November 1942, the squadron flew its planes to Mediouna Airfield, French Morocco, to support Operation Torch, the invasion of North Africa, although some remained behind in England until as late as March 1943. The squadron engaged primarily in air support and interdiction in Tunisia, Sicily, Sardinia, Corsica, Italy and Southern France. Through May 1943, it also attacked shipping and harbor facilities to cut the logistics lines of the Afrika Corps. It bombed marshalling yards, rail lines, highways, bridges, viaducts, troop concentrations, gun emplacements, shipping, harbors and other objectives in North Africa. It moved forward to Tunisia with the allied forces, locating at Dar el Koudia Airfield in June. It bombed airfields, landing grounds and gun emplacements, supporting Operation Corkscrew, the reduction of Pantelleria and Lampedusa islands during June 1943. The following month it supported Operation Husky, the invasion of Sicily.

On 27 August 1943, the squadron conducted a mission against marshalling yards in Benevento, Italy. Despite heavy antiaircraft artillery, it effectively bombed the target and destroyed several enemy interceptor aircraft making persistent attacks. For this action, it was awarded the Distinguished Unit Citation (DUC). From August 1943 to the end of hostilities in the spring of 1945, it struck German lines of communication, bridges, rail lines, marshalling yards, viaducts, tunnels and road junctions in Italy. From January through June 1944, it gave air support to ground forces in the drive toward Rome. The squadron also engaged in psychological warfare missions, dropping propaganda leaflets behind enemy lines.

In August 1944, it supported Operation Dragoon, the invasion of southern France from its base in Ghisonaccia Airfield, Corsica. On 10 March 1945, the squadron maintained close formation in the face of severe antiaircraft fire in successfully attacking the railroad bridge at Ora, a vital link in the German supply line to Italy. For this action, it was awarded its second DUC. In April 1945, it moved to Italy and was inactivated in theater in September 1945.

=== Reserve operations ===
The squadron was reactivated at Bedford Army Air Field as part of the reserve in June 1947. The allotment of units to the reserves at this time was made only for planning purposes and mobilization plans called for personnel assigned to the units to be called to active duty during mobilization as individuals, not as units. Aircraft were allotted to reserve units as a means of maintaining flying proficiency, not combat readiness. The aircraft were overwhelmingly trainers, with no bombers being assigned. The squadron was inactivated in June 1949, when Continental Air Command reorganized its reserve units under the Wing Base organization system and its resources were transferred to elements of the 89th Troop Carrier Wing.

=== Strategic Air Command ===
The squadron was activated at Forbes Air Force Base, Kansas in late March 1952 but was not operational until April 1952, when it began to receive Boeing B-29 Superfortress bombardment training from the 90th Bombardment Wing, which lasted until August 1952. Under the dual deputy organization system adopted by Strategic Air Command (SAC), the squadron was assigned directly to the 310th Bombardment Wing. On completing its training, the squadron moved to Smoky Hill Air Force Base, Kansas. In turn, it trained the 40th Bombardment Wing on bomber operations from February through May 1953.

It replaced its propeller-driven B-29s with new Boeing B-47E Stratojet swept-wing medium bombers in 1954. The 381th deployed with the 310th Wing to RAF Upper Heyford from 10 March to 8 June 1955 and to RAF Greenham Common from 3 October 1956 to 9 January 1957. Operation Reflex alert operations began in 1957. Reflex placed Stratojets and Boeing KC-97 Stratofreighters at overseas bases closer to the Soviet Union for 90 day periods, although individuals rotated back to home bases during unit Reflex deployments.

From 1958, SAC's Stratojet units began to assume an alert posture at their home bases, reducing the amount of time spent on alert at overseas bases. General Thomas S. Power set an initial goal of maintaining one third of SAC's planes on fifteen minute ground alert, fully fueled and ready for combat to reduce vulnerability to a Soviet missile strike. The alert commitment was increased to half the squadron's aircraft in 1962.

In early 1965, the squadron began phasing down in preparation for inactivation. It became non-operational in February and was inactivated in March, as Schilling Air Force Base prepared to close.

== Lineage ==
- Constituted as the 381st Bombardment Squadron (Medium) on 28 January 1942

Activated on 15 March 1942
Redesignated 381st Bombardment Squadron, Medium c. 30 August 1943
Inactivated on 12 September 1945
Redesignated 381st Bombardment Squadron, Light on 11 March 1947
Activated in the reserve on 9 August 1947
Inactivated on 27 Jun 1949
Redesignated 381st Bombardment Squadron, Medium on 15 March 1952
Activated on 28 March 1952
Inactivated on 25 March 1965

=== Assignments ===
- 310th Bombardment Group, 15 March 1942 –12 September 1945
- 310th Bombardment Group, 9 August 1947 – 27 June 1949
- 310th Bombardment Wing (later 310th Strategic Aerospace Wing), 28 March 1952 – 25 March 1965

=== Stations ===
- Davis-Monthan Field, Arizona, 15 March 1942
- Jackson Army Air Base, Mississippi, 15 March 1942
- Key Field, Mississippi, 25 April 1942
- Columbia Army Air Base, South Carolina, 18 May 1942
- Walterboro Army Air Field, South Carolina, 14 August 1942
- Greenville Army Air Base, South Carolina, 18 September – 17 October 1942
- RAF Hardwick (Station 104), England, September–November 1942 (air echelon)
- Mediouna Airfield, French Morocco, 18 November 1942
- Telergma Airfield, Algeria, 21 December 1942
- Berteaux Airfield, Algeria, 1 January 1943
- Dar el Koudia Airfield, Tunisia, c. 6 June 1943
- Menzel Temime Airfield, Tunisia, 5 August 1943 (operated from Oudna Airfield, Tunisia after 11 October 1943)
- Philippeville Airfield, Algeria, 18 November 1943
- Ghisonaccia Airfield, Corsica, France, 21 January 1944
- Fano Airfield, Italy, 7 April 1945
- Pomigliano Airfield, Italy, c. 15 August – 12 September 1945
- Bedford Army Air Field, Massachusetts, 9 August 1947 – 27 June 1949
- Forbes Air Force Base, Kansas, 28 March 1952
- Smoky Hill Air Force Base (later Schilling Air Force Base), Kansas, 3 September 1952 – 25 March 1965

=== Aircraft ===
- North American B-25 Mitchell, 1942-1945
- Boeing B-29 Superfortress, 1952-1954
- Boeing B-47 Stratojet, 1954-1965

=== Awards and campaigns ===
Award streamer	Award	Dates	Notes
	Distinguished Unit Citation	27 August 1943	Italy
	Distinguished Unit Citation	10 March 1945	Ora, Italy
	Air Force Outstanding Unit Award	1 January 1956–1 January 1959	

Campaign Streamer	Campaign	Dates	Notes
	Air Combat, EAME Theater	September 1942–11 May 1945	
	Tunisia	18 November 1942–13 May 1943	
	Sicily	14 May 1943–17 August 1943	
	Southern France	15 August 1944–14 September 1944	
	Naples-Foggia	18 August 1943–21 January 1944	
	North Apennines	10 September 1944–4 April 1945	
	Rhineland	15 September 1944–21 March 1945	
	Po Valley	3 April 1945–8 May 1945	
	Central Europe	22 March 1944–21 May 1945	

== See also ==
- List of United States Air Force squadrons
- List of B-29 Superfortress operators
- List of B-47 units of the United States Air Force
