= 428th Bombardment Squadron =

428th Electromagnetic Warfare Flight (formerly 428th Bombardment Squadron)
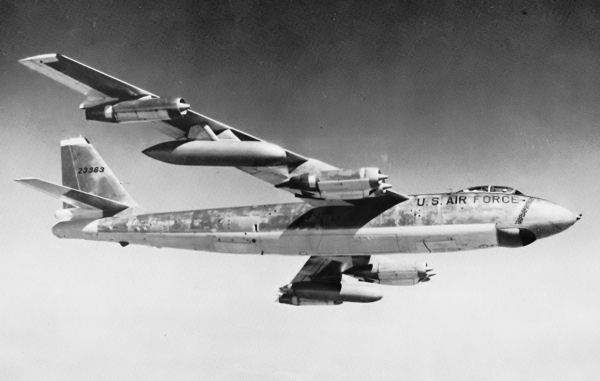
- B-47 Stratojet as flown by the squadron 1958-1962
- Active: 1942-1945; 1959-1962
- Country: United States
- Branch: United States Air Force
- Role: Medium Bomber
- Mottos: Tempori Efficientes (Latin for 'On Time and Effective')
- Engagements: Mediterranean Theater of Operations
- Decorations: Distinguished Unit Citation

Insignia
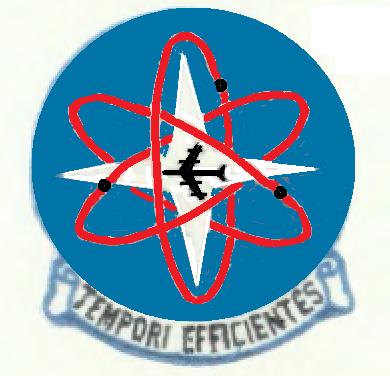
- Patch with 428th Bombardment Squadron emblem (Note: Approved 14 July 1960. Description: On an Air Force blue disc a compass rose of four points white, shadowed silver-gray, surmounted at honor point by a black silhouetted aircraft in flight fesswise, all encircled by an atomic symbol of three black electrons on red orbits, all edged white.)

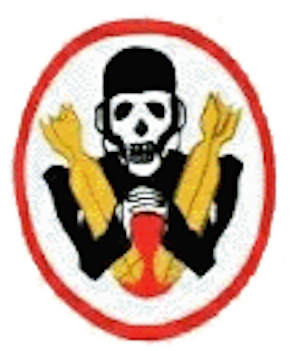
- Patch with 428th Bombardment Squadron World War II emblem
- World War II tail stripe: Top Yellow, bottom third red

The 428th Electromagnetic Warfare Flight is an active Air Force Reserve Command unit, stationed at Peterson Space Force Base, Colorado. It is a reserve associate squadron of the 4th Electromagnetic Warfare Squadron of the United States Space Force.

The squadron was first active during World War II as the 39th Reconnaissance Squadron, becoming a medium bomber as the 428th Bombardment Squadron a month after it was activated. After training in the United States, it deployed to the Mediterranean Theater of Operations, where it participated in Operation Torch, the invasion of North Africa. It moved forward with American ground forces. The squadron was awarded a two Distinguished Unit Citations for its actions in combat. Following V-E Day, the squadron was inactivated in theater.

The squadron was assigned to the 310th Bombardment Wing at Schilling Air Force Base, Kansas, where it was active from February 1959 to 1 January 1962. It was inactivated when Strategic Air Command's alert commitments changed.

== Mission ==
The 428th Electromagnetic Warfare Flight is an associate to the regular 4th Electromagnetic Warfare Squadron in partnership to train, equip, mobilize and employ space electromagnetic warfare capabilities to support national security objectives. The reservists provide knowledge of orbital mechanics, satellite command-and-control and mission planning concepts to bolster surge capacity for this mission.

== History ==
=== World War II ===
==== Initial organization and training ====
The squadron was activated at Davis-Monthan Field in March 1942 as the 39th Reconnaissance Squadron, one of the four original squadrons of the 310th Bombardment Group. It moved the same day to Jackson Army Air Base, Mississippi, where it began training with North American B-25 Mitchells. A little over a month later, the squadron became the 428th Bombardment Squadron. A portion of the ground echelon sailed for the United Kingdom aboard the RMS Queen Mary on 5 September 1942, (Note: Freeman refers to this as the air echelon on page 265, but contradicts this on page 15, which has more detail on the 310th Group's time in England.) while the remainder sailed directly for North Africa from the United States. The air echelon ferried the squadron's Mitchells via the North Atlantic ferry route, but bad weather delayed their movement, with the bombers arriving at RAF Hardwick between October and December 1942.

==== Combat in the Mediterranean heater ====
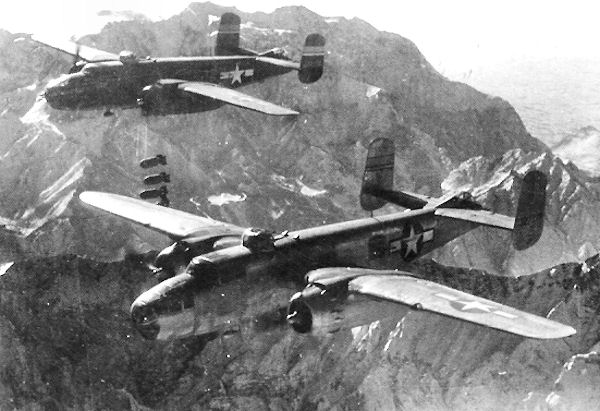
310th Bombardment Group Mitchells attacking Brenner Pass 1944

In November 1942, the squadron flew its planes to Mediouna Airfield, French Morocco, to support Operation Torch, the invasion of North Africa, although some remained behind in England until as late as March 1943. The squadron engaged primarily in air support and interdiction in Tunisia, Sicily, Sardinia, Corsica, Italy and Southern France. Through May 1943, it also attacked shipping and harbor facilities to cut the logistics lines of the Afrika Corps. It bombed marshalling yards, rail lines, highways, bridges, viaducts, troop concentrations, gun emplacements, shipping, harbors and other objectives in North Africa. It moved forward to Tunisia with the allied forces, locating at Dar el Koudia Airfield in June. It bombed airfields, landing grounds and gun emplacements, supporting Operation Corkscrew, the reduction of Pantelleria and Lampedusa islands during June 1943. The following month it supported Operation Husky, the invasion of Sicily.

On 27 August 1943, the squadron conducted a mission against marshalling yards in Benevento, Italy. Despite heavy antiaircraft artillery, it effectively bombed the target and destroyed several enemy interceptor aircraft making persistent attacks. For this action, it was awarded the Distinguished Unit Citation (DUC). From August 1943 to the end of hostilities in the spring of 1945, it struck German lines of communication, bridges, rail lines, marshalling yards, viaducts, tunnels and road junctions in Italy. From January through June 1944, it gave air support to ground forces in the drive toward Rome. The squadron also engaged in psychological warfare missions, dropping propaganda leaflets behind enemy lines.

In August 1944, it supported Operation Dragoon, the invasion of southern France from its base in Ghisonaccia Airfield, Corsica. On 10 March 1945, the squadron maintained close formation in the face of severe antiaircraft fire in successfully attacking the railroad bridge at Ora, a vital link in the German supply line to Italy. For this action, it was awarded its second DUC. In April 1945, it moved to Italy and was inactivated in theater in September 1945.

=== Strategic Air Command ===
From 1958, the Boeing B-47 Stratojet wings of Strategic Air Command (SAC) began to assume an alert posture at their home bases, reducing the amount of time spent on alert at overseas bases. The SAC alert cycle divided itself into four parts: planning, flying, alert and rest to meet General Thomas S. Power’s initial goal of maintaining one third of SAC’s planes on fifteen minute ground alert, fully fueled and ready for combat to reduce vulnerability to a Soviet missile strike. To implement this new system B-47 wings reorganized from three to four squadrons. The 428th was activated at Schilling Air Force Base as the fourth squadron of the 310th Bombardment Wing. The alert commitment was increased to half the squadron's aircraft in 1962 and the four squadron pattern no longer met the alert cycle commitment, so the squadron was inactivated on 1 January 1962.

=== Space operations ===
The squadron was redesignated the 428th Electromagnetic Warfare Flight and activated at Peterson Space Force Base, Colorado on 28 February 2023. It absorbed the mission, personnel, and equipment of Detachment 1, 710th Operations Group, which had been organized on 17 September 2021.

== Lineage ==
- Constituted as the 39th Reconnaissance Squadron (Medium) on 28 January 1942

Activated on 15 March 1942
Redesignated 428th Bombardment Squadron (Medium) on 22 April 1942
Redesignated 428th Bombardment Squadron, Medium c. 20 August 1943
Inactivated on 12 September 1945
Activated on 1 February 1959
Discontinued and inactivated on 1 January 1962

- Redesignated 428th Electromagnetic Warfare Flight

Activated on 28 February 2023

=== Assignments ===
- 310th Bombardment Group, 15 March 1942 – 12 September 1945
- 310th Bombardment Wing, 1 February 1959 – 1 January 1962
- 710th Operations Group, 28 February 2023 – present

=== Stations ===
- Davis-Monthan Field, Arizona, 15 March 1942
- Jackson Army Air Base, Mississippi, 15 March 1942
- Key Field, Mississippi, 25 April 1942
- Columbia Army Air Base, South Carolina, c.18 May 1942
- Walterboro Army Air Field, South Carolina, 14 August 1942
- Greenville Army Air Base, South Carolina, 18 September – 17 October 1942 (ground echelon)
- RAF Hardwick (Station 104), England, September – November 1942 (air echelon)
- Mediouna Airfield, French Morocco, 19 November 1942
- Telergma Airfield, Algeria, 21 December 1942
- Berteaux Airfield, Algeria, 1 January 1943
- Dar el Koudia Airfield, Tunisia, 6 June 1943
- Menzel Temime Airfield, Tunisia, 5 August 1943 (operated from Oudna Airfield 11 October – 14 November 1943)
- Philippeville Airfield, Algeria, c. 19 November 1943
- Ghisonaccia Airfield, Corsica, France, 4 January 1944
- Fano Airfield, Italy, 7 April 1945
- Pomigliano Airfield, Italy, c. 15 August – 12 September 1945
- Schilling Air Force Base, Kansas, 1 February 1959 – 1 January 1962
- Peterson Space Force Base, Colorado, 28 February 2023 – present

=== Aircraft ===
- North American B-25 Mitchell, 1942-1945
- Boeing B-47 Stratojet, 1959-1962

=== Awards and campaigns ===
Award streamer	Award	Dates	Notes
	Distinguished Unit Citation	27 August 1943	Italy, 428th Bombardment Squadron
	Distinguished Unit Citation	10 March 1945	Ora, Italy, 428th Bombardment Squadron

Campaign Streamer	Campaign	Dates	Notes
	Tunisia	19 November 1942 – 13 May 1943	428th Bombardment Squadron
	Antisubmarine, EAME Theater	19 November 1942 – 2 September 1945	428th Bombardment Squadron
	Air Combat, EAME Theater	19 November 1942 – 11 May 1945	428th Bombardment Squadron
	Sicily	14 May 1943 – 17 August 1943	428th Bombardment Squadron
	Naples-Foggia	18 August 1943 – 21 January 1944	428th Bombardment Squadron
	Rome-Arno	22 January 1944 – 9 September 1944	428th Bombardment Squadron
	Central Europe	22 March 1944 – 21 May 1945	428th Bombardment Squadron
	Southern France	15 August 1944 – 14 September 1944	428th Bombardment Squadron
	North Apennines	10 September 1944 – 4 April 1945	428th Bombardment Squadron
	Po Valley	3 April 1945 – 8 May 1945	428th Bombardment Squadron
