= 379th Bombardment Squadron =

United States Air Force reserve unit

379th Space Range Squadron (formerly 379th Bombardment Squadron)

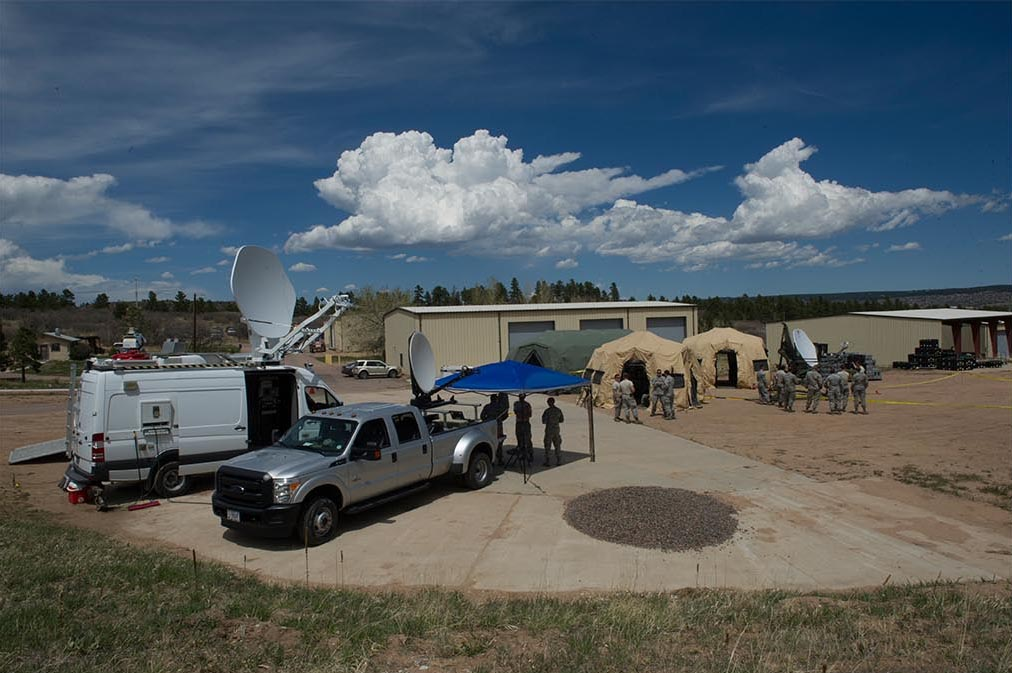
- 379th Space Range Squadron field training at Schriever SFB
- Active: 1942–1945; 1947–1949; 1952–1965; 2012–present
- Country: United States
- Branch: United States Air Force
- Role: Range management
- Part of: Air Force Reserve Command
- Garrison/HQ: Schriever Space Force Base
- Mottos: Volentes et Valentes (Latin for 'Willing and Able') (after 1958)
- Engagements: China Burma India Theater
- Decorations: Distinguished Unit Citation; Air Force Outstanding Unit Award

Insignia
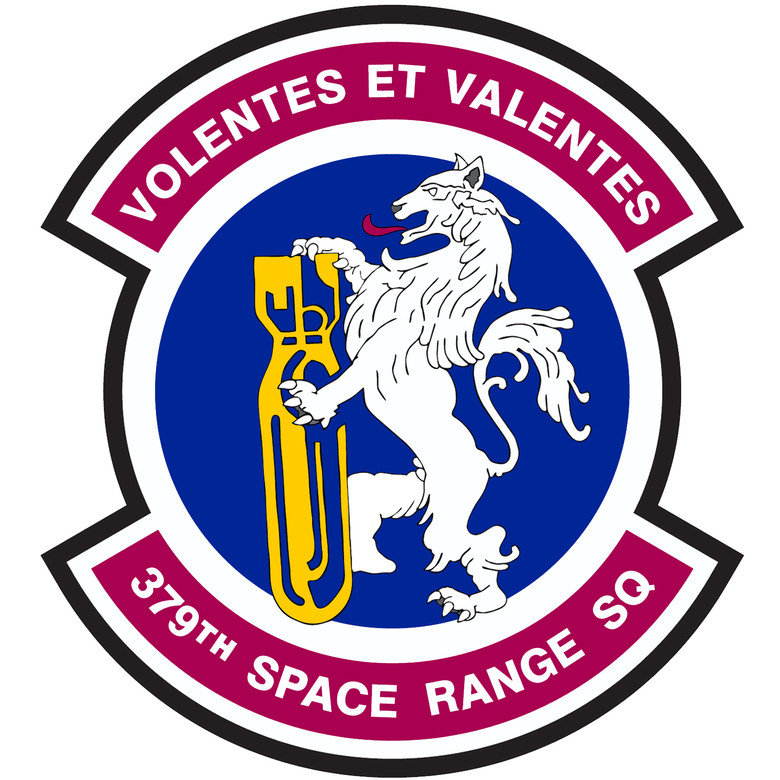
- 379th Space Range Squadron emblem (restored)

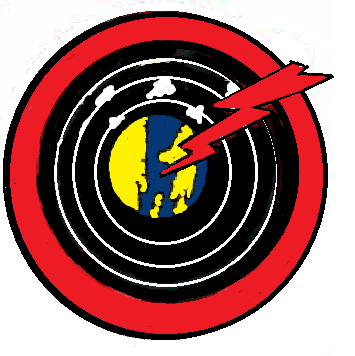
- 379th Bombardment Squadron emblem (Note: Approved 21 January 1958. Description: On a red disc, a black target edged white and bearing three white concentric rings; surmounting the center of the target a globe, land areas Air Force golden yellow, water areas Air force blue; above the globe and surmounting the target six small white clouds; issuing from sinister chief and surmounting all, a red lightning flash edged white pointing to the center of the globe.)

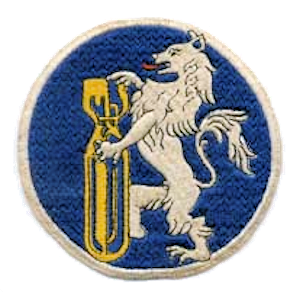
- Patch with World War II 379th Bombardment Squadron emblem
- World War II tail markings: Yellow horizontal stripe (310th Group) with narrower white horizontal stripe below (for 379th Squadron)

The 379th Space Range Squadron is an Air Force Reserve unit. It is assigned to the 926th Wing at Schriever Air Force Base, Colorado. It is a reserve associate squadron of United States Space Force's 25th Space Range Squadron.

The squadron was first active during World War II as the 379th Bombardment Squadron, becoming a medium bomber unit a month after it was activated. After training in the United States, it deployed to the Mediterranean Theater of Operations, where it participated in Operation Torch, the invasion of North Africa. It moved forward with American ground forces. The squadron was awarded two Distinguished Unit Citations for its actions in combat. Following V-E Day, the squadron was inactivated in theater.

The squadron was again activated in the reserve in 1947. It does not appear to have been fully manned or equipped with operational aircraft before it was inactivated in 1949. It was activated in Kansas as a Strategic Air Command strategic bomber unit. It was inactivated on 25 March 1965 as the Boeing B-47 Stratojet bombers it flew were removed from service.

== History ==
=== World War II ===
==== Initial organization and training ====
The squadron was activated at Davis-Monthan Field in March 1942 as the 379th Bombardment Squadron, one of the four original squadrons of the 310th Bombardment Group. It moved the same day to Jackson Army Air Base, Mississippi, where it began training with North American B-25 Mitchells. A portion of the ground echelon sailed for the United Kingdom aboard the RMS Queen Mary on 5 September 1942, (Note: Freeman refers to this as the air echelon on page 265, but contradicts this on page 15, which has more detail on the 310th Group's time in England.) while the remainder sailed directly for North Africa from the United States. The air echelon ferried the squadron's Mitchells via the North Atlantic ferry route, but bad weather delayed their movement, with the bombers arriving at RAF Hardwick between October and December 1942.

==== Combat in the Mediterranean heater ====
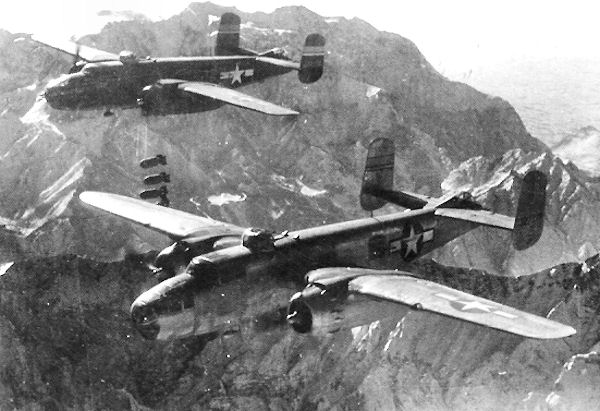
310th Bombardment Group Mitchells attacking Brenner Pass 1944

In November 1942, the squadron flew its planes to Mediouna Airfield, French Morocco, to support Operation Torch, the invasion of North Africa, although some remained behind in England until as late as March 1943. The squadron engaged primarily in air support and interdiction in Tunisia, Sicily, Sardinia, Corsica, Italy and Southern France. Through May 1943, it also attacked shipping and harbor facilities to cut the logistics lines of the Afrika Corps. It bombed marshalling yards, rail lines, highways, bridges, viaducts, troop concentrations, gun emplacements, shipping, harbors and other objectives in North Africa. It moved forward to Tunisia with the allied forces, locating at Dar el Koudia Airfield in June. It bombed airfields, landing grounds and gun emplacements, supporting Operation Corkscrew, the reduction of Pantelleria and Lampedusa islands during June 1943. The following month it supported Operation Husky, the invasion of Sicily.

On 27 August 1943, the squadron conducted a mission against marshalling yards in Benevento, Italy. Despite heavy antiaircraft artillery, it effectively bombed the target and destroyed several enemy interceptor aircraft making persistent attacks. For this action, it was awarded the Distinguished Unit Citation (DUC). From August 1943 to the end of hostilities in the spring of 1945, it struck German lines of communication, bridges, rail lines, marshalling yards, viaducts, tunnels and road junctions in Italy. From January through June 1944, it gave air support to ground forces in the drive toward Rome. The squadron also engaged in psychological warfare missions, dropping propaganda leaflets behind enemy lines.

In August 1944, it supported Operation Dragoon, the invasion of southern France from its base in Ghisonaccia Airfield, Corsica. On 10 March 1945, the squadron maintained close formation in the face of severe antiaircraft fire in successfully attacking the railroad bridge at Ora, a vital link in the German supply line to Italy. For this action, it was awarded its second DUC. In April 1945, it moved to Italy and was inactivated in theater in September 1945.

=== Air Force Reserve ===
The squadron was reactivated at Bedford Army Air Field as part of the reserve in June 1947, although it is unclear whether or not the squadron was fully manned. The allotment of units to the reserves at this time was made only for planning purposes and mobilization plans called for personnel assigned to the units to be called to active duty during mobilization as individuals, not as units. Aircraft were allotted to reserve units as a means of maintaining flying proficiency, not combat readiness. The aircraft were overwhelmingly trainers, with no bombers being assigned. The squadron was inactivated in June 1949, when Continental Air Command reorganized its reserve units under the Wing Base organization system and its resources were transferred to elements of the 89th Troop Carrier Wing.

=== Strategic Air Command ===
The squadron was activated at Forbes Air Force Base, Kansas in late March 1952 but was not operational until April 1952, when it began to receive Boeing B-29 Superfortress bombardment training from the 90th Bombardment Wing, which lasted until August 1952. Under the dual deputy organization system adopted by Strategic Air Command (SAC), the squadron was assigned directly to the 310th Bombardment Wing. On completing its training, the squadron moved to Smoky Hill Air Force Base, Kansas. In turn, it trained the 40th Bombardment Wing on bomber operations from February through May 1953.

It replaced its propeller-driven B-29s with new Boeing B-47E Stratojet swept-wing medium bombers in 1954. The 379th deployed with the 310th Wing to RAF Upper Heyford from 10 March to 8 June 1955 and to RAF Greenham Common from 3 October 1956 to 9 January 1957. Operation Reflex alert operations began in 1957. Reflex placed Stratojets and Boeing KC-97 Stratofreighters at overseas bases closer to the Soviet Union for 90 day periods, although individuals rotated back to home bases during unit Reflex deployments.

From 1958, SAC's Stratojet units began to assume an alert posture at their home bases, reducing the amount of time spent on alert at overseas bases. General Thomas S. Power set an initial goal of maintaining one third of SAC's planes on fifteen minute ground alert, fully fueled and ready for combat to reduce vulnerability to a Soviet missile strike. The alert commitment was increased to half the squadron's aircraft in 1962.

In early 1965, the squadron began phasing down in preparation for inactivation. It became non-operational in February and was inactivated in March, as Schilling Air Force Base prepared to close.

=== Space range unit ===
The squadron was redesignated the 379th Space Range Squadron and activated at Schriever Air Force Base, Colorado on 1 April 2012. It serves as a reserve associate squadron with the regular Air Force 25th Space Range Squadron. In 2014, the squadron's gaining command changed from Air Force Space Command to Air Combat Command. The squadron has participated in exercises Austere Challenge, Anakonda and Juniper Cobra in Europe; Global Thunder, Global Lightning, Ardent Sentry and Red Flag in the United States; and Valiant Shield in the Pacific.

== Lineage ==
- Constituted as the 379th Bombardment Squadron (Medium) on 28 January 1942

Activated on 15 March 1942
Redesignated 379th Bombardment Squadron, Medium c. 20 August 1943
Inactivated on 12 September 1945
Redesignated 379th Bombardment Squadron, Light on 11 March 1947
Activated in the reserve on 9 August 1947
Inactivated on 27 June 1949
Redesignated 379th Bombardment Squadron, Medium on 15 March 1952
Activated on 28 March 1952 (not operational until April 1952)
Discontinued and inactivated on 25 March 1965 (not operational after 25 February 1965)

- Redesignated 379th Space Range Squadron on 14 February 2012

Activated on 1 April 2012

=== Assignments ===
- 310th Bombardment Group, 15 March 1942 – 12 September 1945
- 310th Bombardment Group, 9 August 1947 – 27 June 1949
- 310th Bombardment Wing (later 310th Strategic Aerospace Wing), 28 March 1952 – 25 March 1965
- 310th Operations Group, 1 April 2012
- 926th Operations Group, 2014

=== Stations ===
- Davis–Monthan Field, Arizona, 15 March 1942
- Jackson Army Air Base, Mississippi, 15 March 1942
- Key Field, Mississippi, c. 25 April 1942
- Columbia Army Air Base, South Carolina, 17 May 1942
- Walterboro Army Air Field, South Carolina, 14 August 1942
- Greenville Army Air Base, South Carolina, 18 September – 17 October 1942 (ground echelon)

RAF Hardwick (Station 104), England, September – November 1942 (air echelon)

- Mediouna Airfield, French Morocco, 18 November 1942
- Telergma Airfield, Algeria, 21 December 1942
- Berteaux Airfield, Algeria, 1 January 1943
- Dar el Koudia Airfield, Tunisia, c. 6 June 1943
- Menzel Temime Airfield, Tunisia, c. 5 August 1943
- Philippeville Airfield, Algeria, 10 November 1943
- Ghisonaccia Airfield, Corsica, France, c. 10 December 1943
- Fano Airfield, Italy, 7 April 1945
- Pomigliano Airfield, Italy, c. 15 August – 12 September 1945
- Bedford Army Air Field (later Hanscom Airport, Bedford Air Field, Hanscom Field), Massachusetts, 12 June 1947 – 27 June 1949
- Forbes Air Force Base, Kansas, 28 March 1952
- Smoky Hill Air Force Base (later Schilling Air Force Base), Kansas, 4 September 1952 – 25 March 1965
- Schriever Air Force Base, Colorado, 1 April 2012 – present

=== Aircraft ===
- North American B-25 Mitchell, 1942–1945
- Boeing B-29 Superfortress, 1952–1954
- Boeing B-47 Stratojet, 1954–1965

=== Awards and campaigns ===
Award streamer	Award	Dates	Notes
	Distinguished Unit Citation	27 August 1943	Italy 379th Bombardment Squadron
	Distinguished Unit Citation	10 March 1945	Ora, Italy 379th Bombardment Squadron
	Air Force Outstanding Unit Award	1 January 1956–1 January 1959	379th Bombardment Squadron
	Air Force Outstanding Unit Award	1 October 2013–31 December 2014	379th Space Range Squadron

Campaign Streamer	Campaign	Dates	Notes
	Air Combat, EAME Theater	September 1942–11 May 1945	379th Bombardment Squadron
	Tunisia	18 November 1942–13 May 1943	379th Bombardment Squadron
	Sicily	14 May 1943–17 August 1943	379th Bombardment Squadron
	Southern France	15 August 1944–14 September 1944	379th Bombardment Squadron
	Naples-Foggia	18 August 1943–21 January 1944	379th Bombardment Squadron
	North Apennines	10 September 1944–4 April 1945	379th Bombardment Squadron
	Rhineland	15 September 1944–21 March 1945	379th Bombardment Squadron
	Po Valley	3 April 1945–8 May 1945	379th Bombardment Squadron
	Central Europe	22 March 1944–21 May 1945	379th Bombardment Squadron

== See also ==
- List of United States Air Force squadrons
- List of B-29 Superfortress operators
- List of B-47 units of the United States Air Force
