= Shariful M. Khan =

US Air Force general

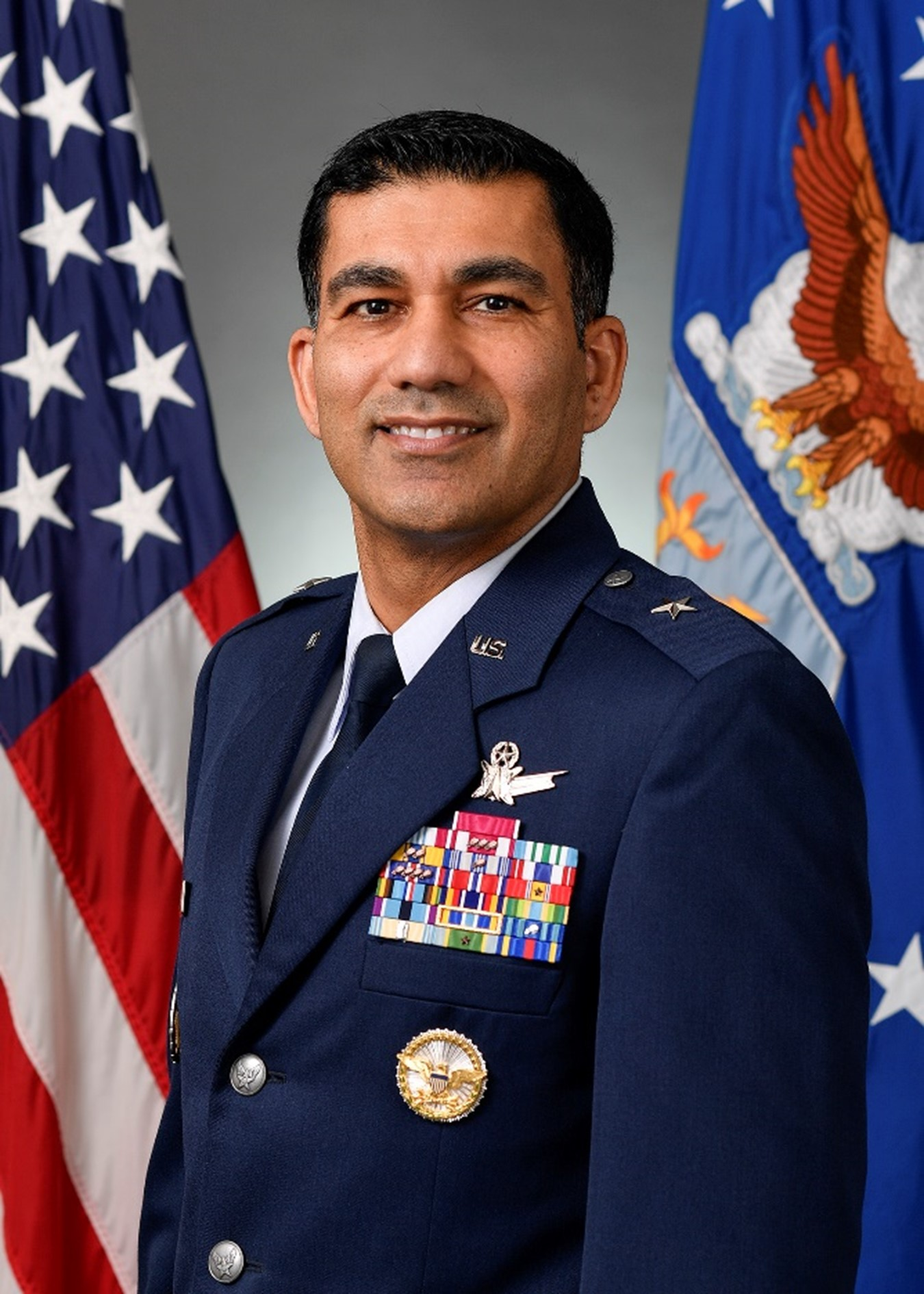
- Official portrait, 2025
- Military career
- Allegiance: United States
- Branch: United States Air Force
- Service years: 1997 — present
- Rank: Brigadier general
- Commands: 379th Space Range Squadron; 310th Space Wing
- Awards: See List

Shariful M. Khan is a brigadier general in the United States Air Force, who is currently serving as Director of Staff, Golden Dome for America, assigned at the Pentagon. He is the first Bangladeshi-American to obtain this rank.

== Career ==
Khan began his career in 1997 as Assistant Regional Director of Admissions at the University of Michigan before completing Undergraduate Space and Missile Training at Vandenberg AFB in 1998. He then served at Onizuka AFS with the 5th Space Operations Squadron and 21st Space Operations Squadrons in roles including Upper Stage Operations Officer, Chief of Upper Stage Operations, and Executive Officer, alongside a deployment to Kuwait at Ali Al Salem Air Base with the 386th Air Expeditionary Group.

From 2002 to 2010, he took on a series of leadership positions in space operations. These included Chief of Command and Control Branch (NRO), Flight Commander and Operations Support Flight Commander with the 76th Space Control Squadron, duty with the 26th Space Aggressor Squadron, and later roles as Flight Commander and Assistant Operations Officer with the 380th Space Control Squadron. During this time, he also attended Squadron Officer School.

His education and strategic assignments continued from 2010 to 2016. He studied at the National Defense Intelligence College, the School of Advanced Air and Space Studies, and later the Naval War College. Between studies, he served as Military Deputy in the Air Force Strategy Division at the Pentagon and commanded the 379th Space Range Squadron at Schriever AFB.

From 2017 onward, his career centered on senior leadership. He was the Executive Officer to the Chief of Air Force Reserve, then Director of U.S. Air Force Reserve Programs and Integration at the Pentagon. He went on to command the 310th Space Wing from 2020 to 2023, before serving as Mobilization Assistant to Chief Strategy and Resourcing Officer and Commander of Space Training and Readiness Command, two senior U.S. Space Force roles. Since July 2025, he has been Director of Staff for Golden Dome for America at the Pentagon.

== Dates of promotion ==
Rank	Date
Second Lieutenant	May 28, 1997
First Lieutenant	May 28, 1999
Captain	May 28, 2001
Major	December 6, 2006
Lieutenant Colonel	August 10, 2012
Colonel	July 17, 2017
Brigadier General	June 30, 2025

== Awards and decorations ==
Khan has received numerous awards, which are shown below.

Legion of Merit
Defense Meritorious Service Medal
Meritorious Service Medal with three Oak leaf cluster
Joint Service Commendation Medal
Air and Space Commendation Medal with two Oak leaf cluster
Air and Space Achievement Medal with one Oak leaf cluster
Air Force Meritorious Unit Award
Air Force Outstanding Unit Award with four Oak leaf cluster
Air Force Organizational Excellence Award
National Defense Service Medal with service star
Armed Forces Expeditionary Medal
Global War on Terrorism Service Medal
Armed Forces Service Medal
Humanitarian Service Medal
Air and Space Expeditionary Service Ribbon
Air and Space Longevity Service Award with one silver Oak leaf cluster
Armed Forces Reserve Medal
Small Arms Expert Marksmanship Ribbon with service star
Air and Space Training Ribbon
