= Ghisonaccia Alzitone Airport =

- IATA: none; ICAO: LFKG

Summary
- Airport type: Public
- Location: Ghisonaccia, France
- Elevation AMSL: 177 ft / 54 m
- Coordinates: 42°03′18″N 009°24′07″E

Map

Runways
Direction	Length		Surface
Direction	m	ft	Surface
01/19	800	2,625	Paved
- Sources: French AIP

Ghisonaccia Alzitone Airport (ICAO: LFKG) is an airport in France, located 2 km (1.2 mi) north of Ghisonaccia in the Haute-Corse department, approximately 61 km (38 mi) southeast of Corte on Corsica.

The airport is used for general aviation, with no commercial airline service.

== World War II ==
During World War II, Ghisonaccia Airfield was a military airfield used by the United States Army Air Forces. It was an all-weather temporary field built in late 1943 by the XII Engineer Command using Marsden Matting for runways and parking areas, as well as for dispersal sites. In addition, tents were used for billeting and also for support facilities; an access road was built to the existing road infrastructure; a dump for supplies, ammunition, and gasoline drums, along with a drinkable water and minimal electrical grid for communications and station lighting. It was turned over to the Twelfth Air Force for operational combat use. Known units assigned to the airfield were:

- HQ 57th Bombardment Wing, 20 April-5 October 1944
- 310th Bombardment Group, 10 December 1943 – 7 April 1945, B-25 Mitchell
- 414th Night Fighter Squadron, (Twelfth Air Force), 9 January-4 February 1944; 20 March–July 1944, Bristol Beaufighter
- 417th Night Fighter Squadron, (Twelfth Air Force), 7 January–February 1944, (Ground echelon only)

After the war ended, the airfield was turned over to local authorities. Today the military airfield has been developed into a small, regional airport used by small aircraft.
