= 310th Space Wing =

U.S. Air Force reserve component

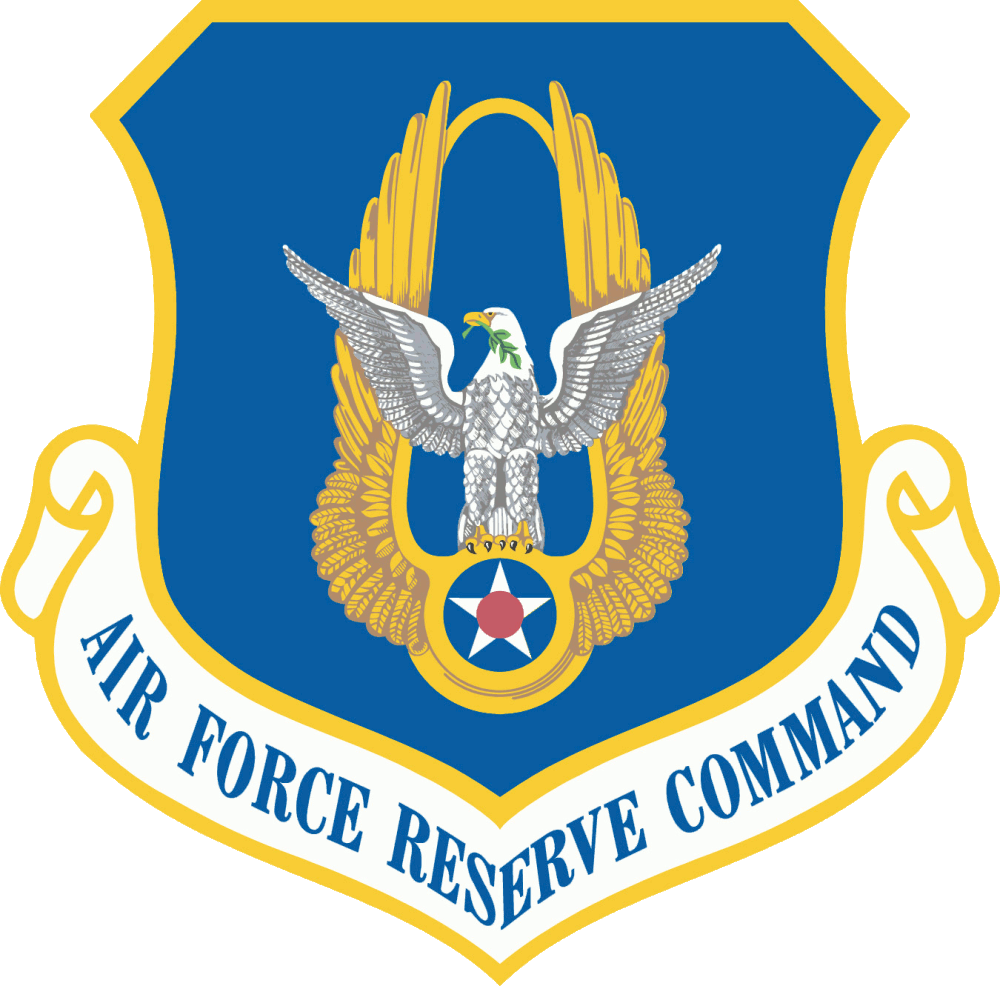
310th Space Wing

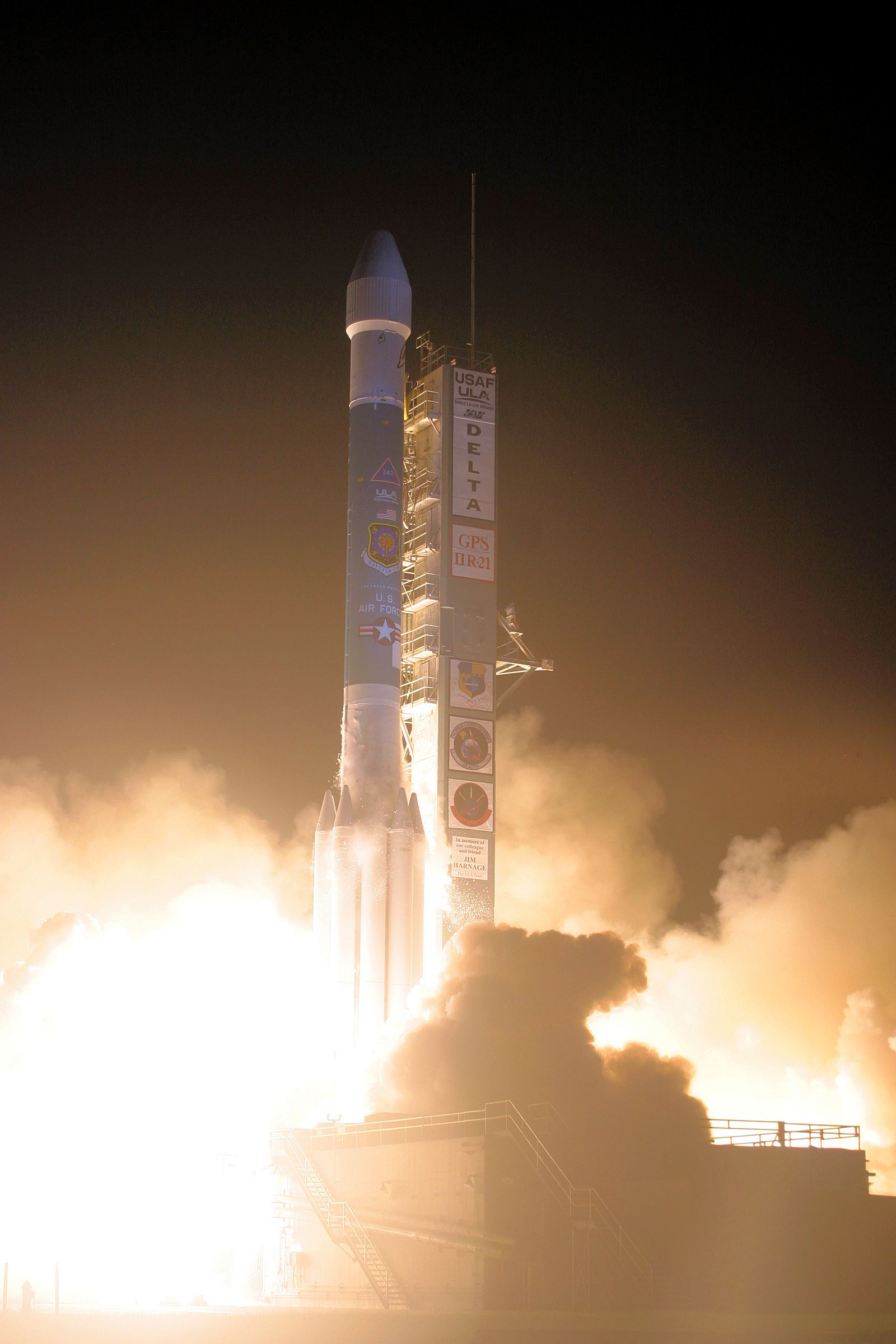
- A United Launch Alliance Delta II rocket blasts off with the Air Force's Global Positioning System IIR-21 satellite from Space Launch Complex-17A, 2009
- Active: 1942–1945; 1946–1949; 1952–1965; 1991–1993; 1997–present
- Country: United States
- Branch: United States Air Force
- Type: Wing
- Role: Space Operations
- Part of: Air Force Reserve Command
- Garrison/HQ: Schriever Space Force Base, Colorado
- Engagements: Mediterranean Theater

Insignia
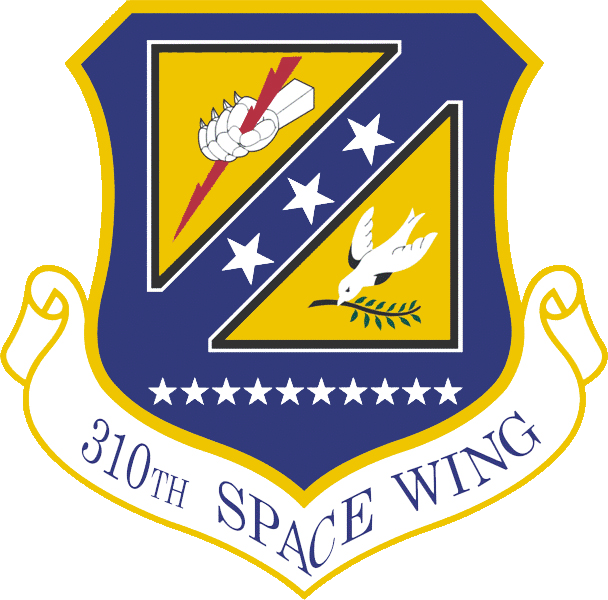
- 310th Space Wing emblem (Note: Modified 26 December 2000.)

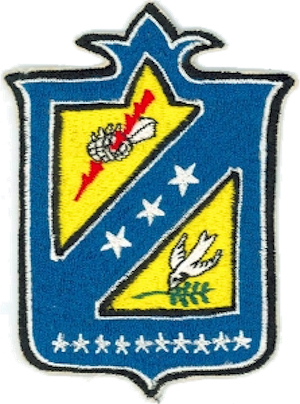
- 310th Bombardment Wing emblem (Note: Original form, approved 7 January 1954.)

The 310th Space Wing is an Air Reserve component of the United States Air Force. It is assigned to the Tenth Air Force, Air Force Reserve Command, stationed at Schriever Space Force Base, Colorado. The wing is the only space wing in the Air Force reserve. It provides specialized expertise, continuity and combat ready personnel. It is mission partnered with several United States Space Force deltas: Space Delta 2, Space Delta 3, Space Delta 4, and Space Launch Delta 30.

The wing is commanded by Colonel Melissa “Missy” Burton who took command 1 May 2026 Chief Master Sergeant Joshua Francois is the 310th Space Wing Command Chief.2

The wing dates back to World War II, when it began as the 310th Bombardment Group on 15 March 1942, flying North American B-25 Mitchell medium bombers. In October 1942, the 310th was the first 12th Air Force group sent overseas, initially to England and then to French Morocco, Algeria, Tunisia, France, and Italy where it participated in the European-African-Middle Eastern Campaign. The 310th Bombardment Group was inactivated in September 1945.

== Overview ==
The 310th Bombardment Wing was reactivated in 1952 as part of Strategic Air Command. It trained on the Boeing B-29 Superfortress before converting to the Boeing B-47 Stratojet. It was inactivated in June 1965 with the phaseout of the B-47 from the U.S. Air Force inventory.

The 310th became part of Air Force Space Command in 1991 when the 310th Training and Test Wing was activated for a short time at Vandenberg Space Force Base, Calif.; the 310th designator was again activated with the stand up of the 310th Space Group on 4 September 1997. The 310th Space Group was re-designated the 310th Space Wing on 7 March 2008.

== Subordinate units ==
The wing is composed of the 310th Operations Group, 710th Operations Group, and 310th Mission Support Group, that support various military and other government organizations including, but not limited to, the Department of Commerce, United States Space Force, and Space Operations Command.

- 310th Operations Group
  - 6th Space Operations Squadron (Defense Meteorological Satellite Program backup for NOAA)
  - 7th Space Operations Squadron (associate unit to 1st Space Operations Squadron)
  - 9th Combat Operations Squadron (supports the Combined Space Operations Center at Vandenberg Space Force Base)
  - 19th Space Operations Squadron (associate unit to 2 SOPS)
  - 26th Space Aggressor Squadron (associate unit to 527 SAS)
  - 379th Space Range Squadron (associate unit to 25th Space Range Squadron)
  - 14th Test Squadron (associate unit to 17th Test and Evaluation Squadron)
  - 310th Operations Support Squadron (provides operations support and applicable program oversight to the space operations squadrons)
- 710th Operations Group
  - 380th Electromagnetic Warfare Squadron (associate unit to 16th Electromagnetic Warfare Squadron at Peterson Space Force Base)
  - 8th Space Warning Squadron (operates Space-Based Infrared System at Buckley Space Force Base)
  - 4th Space Warning Squadron (Associate unit to the 11 SWS at Buckley SFB)
  - 428th Electromagnetic Warfare Flight (Associate unit to the 4 EWS at Peterson SFB)
  - 42nd Combat Training Squadron (Associate unit to the 319 CTS at Peterson SFB)
- 310th Mission Support Group
  - 310th Security Forces Squadron
  - 710th Security Forces Squadron
  - 310th Force Support Squadron
  - 310th Communications Flight (associate unit to 561st Network Operations Squadron (INOSC West) at Peterson Space Force Base)

== History ==
=== World War II ===
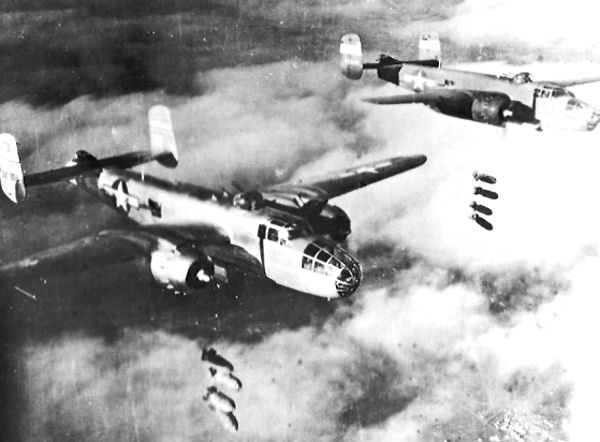
B-25Js of the 310th Bombardment Group release 1,000 pound bombs over a cloud-obscured Po Valley in northern Italy, 1944.

The unit was constituted as the 310th Bombardment Group (Medium) on 28 January 1942 and activated on 15 March 1942. Used North American B-25 Mitchells in preparing for duty overseas.

Moved to the Mediterranean theater by single aircraft between October 1942 and March 1943 and assigned to Twelfth Air Force. Sufficient aircraft were on hand by 2 December, when it conducted its first operation against antiaircraft concentrations at Gabes, Tunisia. Engaged primarily in support and interdictory operations in Tunisia, Sicily, Italy, Corsica, Sardinia, and southern France. The 310th Bomb Group also flew some missions to Austria and Yugoslavia.

The unit attacked harbors and shipping to help defeat Axis forces in North Africa, December 1942 – May 1943. Bombed airdromes, landing grounds, and gun emplacements on Pantelleria, Lampedusa, and Sicily, May–July 1943. The unit supported the Allied landing at Salerno, September 1943. Assisted the drive toward Rome, January–June 1944.

Supported the invasion of Southern France, August 1944. Struck German communications— bridges, rail lines, marshalling yards, viaducts, tunnels, and road junctions in Italy, August 1943 – April 1945. Also dropped propaganda leaflets behind enemy lines.

The 310th Bomb Group received a Distinguished Unit Citation (DUC) for a mission to Italy on 27 August 1943 when, in spite of persistent attacks by enemy interceptors and antiaircraft artillery, the group effectively bombed marshalling yards at Benevento and also destroyed a number of enemy planes. Received second DUC for another mission in Italy on 10 March 1945 when the group, maintaining a compact formation in the face of severe antiaircraft fire, bombed the railroad bridge at Ora, a vital link in the German supply line.

The 310th Bomb Group was inactivated in Italy on 12 September 1945.

The unit was redesignated the 310th Bombardment Group, Light and allotted to the reserve. Activated in the US on 27 December 1946. Inactivated on 27 June 1949.

=== Cold War ===
The 310th Bombardment Wing was activated in 1952 as a Strategic Air Command unit, receiving Boeing B-29 Superfortress bombardment training from 90th Bombardment Wing, April–August 1952. From February through May 1953, the wing provided bombardment training to the 40th Bombardment Wing.

The wing replaced the propeller-driven B-29s with new Boeing B-47E Stratojet swept-wing medium bombers in 1954, capable of flying at high subsonic speeds and primarily designed for penetrating the airspace of the Soviet Union. It participated in SAC Operation Reflex deployments, deploying to RAF Upper Heyford 10 March – 8 June 1955, and at RAF Greenham Common, 3 October 1956 – 9 January 1957, both in the United Kingdom.

The wing gained a strategic missile squadron in April 1961. First CGM-16 Atlas missiles went on alert in September 1962. In the early 1960s, the B-47 was considered to be reaching obsolescence, and was being phased out of SAC's strategic arsenal. B-47s began being sent to AMARC at Davis–Monthan in early 1965; was inactivated in late June.

=== Air Force Space Command ===
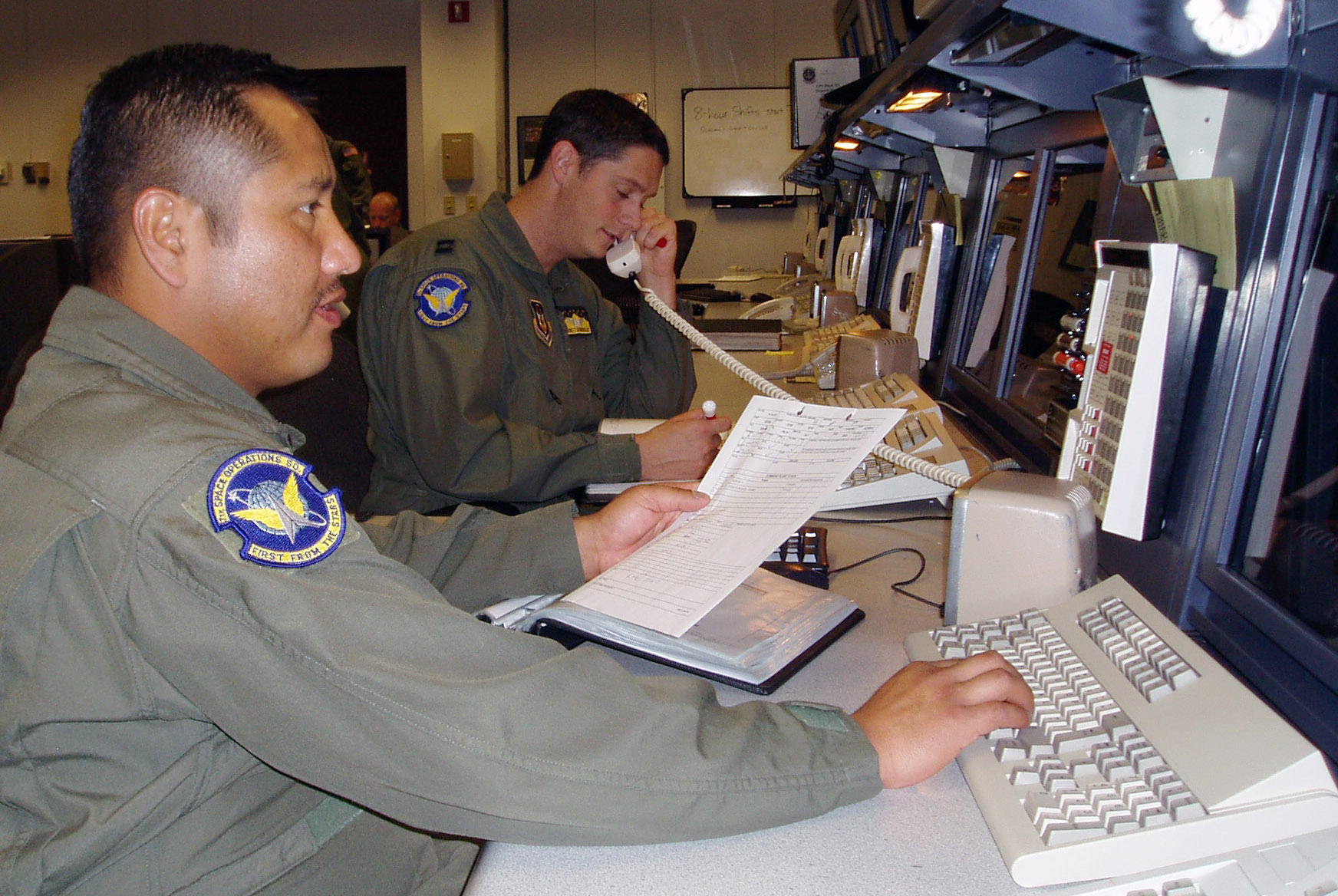
Members of the 7th Space Operations Squadron check on the status of a satellite to ensure it is operating within normal parameters.

On 1 September 1991, the wing was redesignated the 310th Training and Test Wing, and assumed the intercontinental ballistic missile testing and training mission from the Strategic Missile Center (the former 1st Strategic Aerospace Division) at Vandenberg Air Force Base, California under the Twentieth Air Force. After the removal of ICBMs from alert status at the end of the Cold War, the wing continued to train Minuteman crews and to test accuracy and reliability of Minuteman and Peacekeeper missiles. The wing also assisted in testing the Global Positioning System from April 1992 – May 1992. It was reassigned to Air Combat Command on 31 May 1992. It was inactivated on 1 July 1993.

The wing was redesignated the 310th Space Group on 4 September 1997. The group was created around its original squadron, the 7th Space Operations Squadron, and has grown rapidly with the realization of the critical role the Air Force Reserve can play in the future of space operations. The group has been tremendously successful in its initial missions and has been tasked with reviewing future active/Reserve partnerships in space to identify potential areas where the AF Reserve can add value in the space arena.

In 2008 Air Force Reserve Command officials upgraded the group to a wing at what was then Schriever Air Force Base, Colorado. The 310th Space Wing was activated on 7 March 2008.

== Lineage ==
310th Bombardment Group

- Established as the 310th Bombardment Group (Medium) on 28 January 1942

Activated on 15 March 1942
Redesignated 310th Bombardment Group, Medium on 20 August 1943
Inactivated on 12 September 1945

- Redesignated 310th Bombardment Group, Light and activated in the reserve on 27 December 1946.

Inactivated on 27 June 1949

- Consolidated with the 310th Strategic Aerospace Wing as the 310th Strategic Aerospace Wing on 31 January 1984

310th Space Wing

- Established as the 310th Bombardment Wing, Medium on 15 March 1952
- Activated on 28 March 1952
- Redesignated 310th Strategic Aerospace Wing on 1 March 1962

Discontinued and inactivated on 25 June 1965

- Consolidated with the 310th Bombardment Group on 31 January 1984 (remained inactive)
- Redesignated 310th Training and Test Wing on 29 August 1991

Activated on 1 September 1991
Inactivated on 1 July 1993

- Redesignated 310th Space Group on 22 August 1997

Activated in the reserve on 1 September 1997
Redesignated 310th Space Wing on 7 March 2008

=== Assignments ===
- III Bomber Command, 28 March 1942
- XII Bomber Command, 2 May 1942 (attached to 7th Fighter Wing, after 1 February 1943)

7 Fighter Wing (later 47th Bombardment Wing), 18 February 1943
XII Fighter Command, 3 November 1943
57th Bombardment Wing, 20 March 1944

- Twelfth Air Force, 10 August 1945
- Air Force Service Command, Mediterranean Theater of Operations, 15 August – 12 September 1945
- First Air Force, 27 December 1946

3d Bombardment Wing (later 3d Air Division), 17 October 1947 – 27 June 1949

- Fifteenth Air Force, 28 March 1952 (attached to 21st Air Division)
- 802d Air Division, 28 May 1952 (attached to 21st Air Division until 4 September 1952, attached to 7th Air Division, 10 March – 8 June 1955 and 3 October 1956 – 9 January 1957
- 819th Air Division (later 819th Strategic Aerospace Division), 20 June 1960
- 22d Strategic Aerospace Division, 1 July 1962 – 25 June 1965
- Twentieth Air Force, 1 September 1991 – 1 July 1993
- Tenth Air Force, 1 September 1997 – present

=== Stations ===
- Davis–Monthan Field, Arizona, 15 March 1942
- Jackson Army Air Base, Mississippi, 15 March 1942
- Key Field, Mississippi, c. 25 April 1942
- Columbia Army Air Base, South Carolina, 17 May 1942
- Walterboro Army Air Field, South Carolina, 14 August 1942
- Greenville Army Air Base, South Carolina, 18 September – 17 October 1942 (ground echelon)

RAF Hardwick, England, September–November 1942 (air echelon)

- Mediouna Airfield, French Morocco, 18 November 1942
- Telergma Airfield, Algeria, 21 December 1942
- Berteaux Airfield, Algeria, 1 January 1943
- Dar el Koudia Airfield, Tunisia, c. 6 June 1943
- Menzel Temime Airfield, Tunisia, c. 5 August 1943
- Philippeville Airfield, Algeria, 10 November 1943
- Ghisonaccia Airfield, Corsica, c. 10 December 1943
- Fano Airfield, Italy, 7 April 1945
- Pomigliano Airfield, Italy, c. 15 August – 12 September 1945
- Bedford Army Air Field, Massachusetts, 27 December 1946 – 27 June 1949
- Forbes Air Force Base, Kansas, 28 March 1952
- Smoky Hill Air Force Base (later Schilling Air Force Base), Kansas, 4 September 1952 – 25 June 1965
- Vandenberg Air Force Base, California, 1 September 1991 – 1 July 1993
- Falcon Air Force Base (later Schriever Air Force Base, Schriever Space Force Base), Colorado, 1 September 1997 – present

=== Components ===
Wings

- 40th Bombardment Wing: attached 6 February – 1 May 1953

Groups

- 310th Operations Group: 1 September 1991 – 1 July 1993, 7 March 2008 – present
- 710th Operations Group: c. 1 October 2017 – present

Squadrons

- 6th Space Operations Squadron: 1 October 1998 – present
- 7th Space Operations Squadron: 1 September 1997 – present
- 8th Space Operations Squadron (later 8th Space Warning Squadron) : 1 September 1997 – 1 October 1998, 1 October 1999 – 7 March 2008
- 9th Combat Operations Squadron: 1 October 1999 – present
- 39th Reconnaissance Squadron (later 428th Bombardment Squadron: 15 March 1942 – 12 September 1945, 1 February 1959 – 1 January 1962
- 40th Air Refueling Squadron: attached 9 September 1952 – 30 April 1953, assigned 1 June 1960 – 15 March 1963
- 310th Air Refueling Squadron: 8 October 1952 – 25 June 1965
- 379th Bombardment Squadron: 15 March 1942 – 12 September 1945, 11 June 1947 – 27 June 1949, 28 March 1952 – 25 March 1965
- 380th Bombardment Squadron: 15 March 1942 – 12 September 1945, 9 August 1947 – 27 June 1949, 28 March 1952 – 25 March 1965
- 381st Bombardment Squadron: 15 March 1942 – 12 September 1945, 9 August 1947 – 27 June 1949, 28 March 1952 – 25 March 1965
- 550th Strategic Missile Squadron: 1 April 1961 – 25 June 1965

=== Aircraft, Missiles, and Satellites Operated ===
- North American B-25 Mitchell, (1942–1945)
- Boeing B-29 Superfortress (1952–1954)
- Boeing KC-97 Stratofreighter (1952–1963)
- Boeing B-47 Stratojet (1954–1965)
- CGM-16 Atlas (1962–1965)
- Boeing KC-135 Stratotanker (1964–1965)
- Defense Meteorological Satellite Program (1997–present)
- Global Positioning System (1997–present)
- Space-Based Infrared System (2006–present)

== List of commanders ==
No.	Commander		Term		
No.	Portrait	Name	Took office	Left office	Term length
1	Jeffrey Ansted	Colonel; Jeffrey Ansted	7 January 2006	October 2008	~2 years, 268 days
2	Karen A. Rizzuti	Colonel; Karen A. Rizzuti	October 2008	9 January 2011	~2 years, 100 days
3	Jeffrey T. Mineo	Colonel; Jeffrey T. Mineo	9 January 2011	12 July 2014	3 years, 184 days
4	Damon S. Feltman	Colonel; Damon S. Feltman	12 July 2014	17 September 2016	2 years, 67 days
5	Traci L. Kueker-Murphy	Colonel; Traci L. Kueker-Murphy	17 September 2016	3 November 2018	2 years, 47 days
6	Dean D. Sniegowski	Colonel; Dean D. Sniegowski	3 November 2018	31 July 2020	1 year, 271 days
7	Shariful M. Khan	Colonel; Shariful M. Khan	31 July 2020	3 June 2023	2 years, 307 days
8	James R. Taggart	Colonel; James R. Taggart	3 June 2023	15 July 2024	1 year, 42 days
9	Adam H. Fisher	Colonel; Adam H. Fisher	15 July 2024	Incumbent	2 years, 62 days

== See also ==
- List of B-29 Superfortress operators
- List of B-47 units of the United States Air Force
- 521st Air Service Group Support unit for the group in World War II
