= 7th Space Operations Squadron =

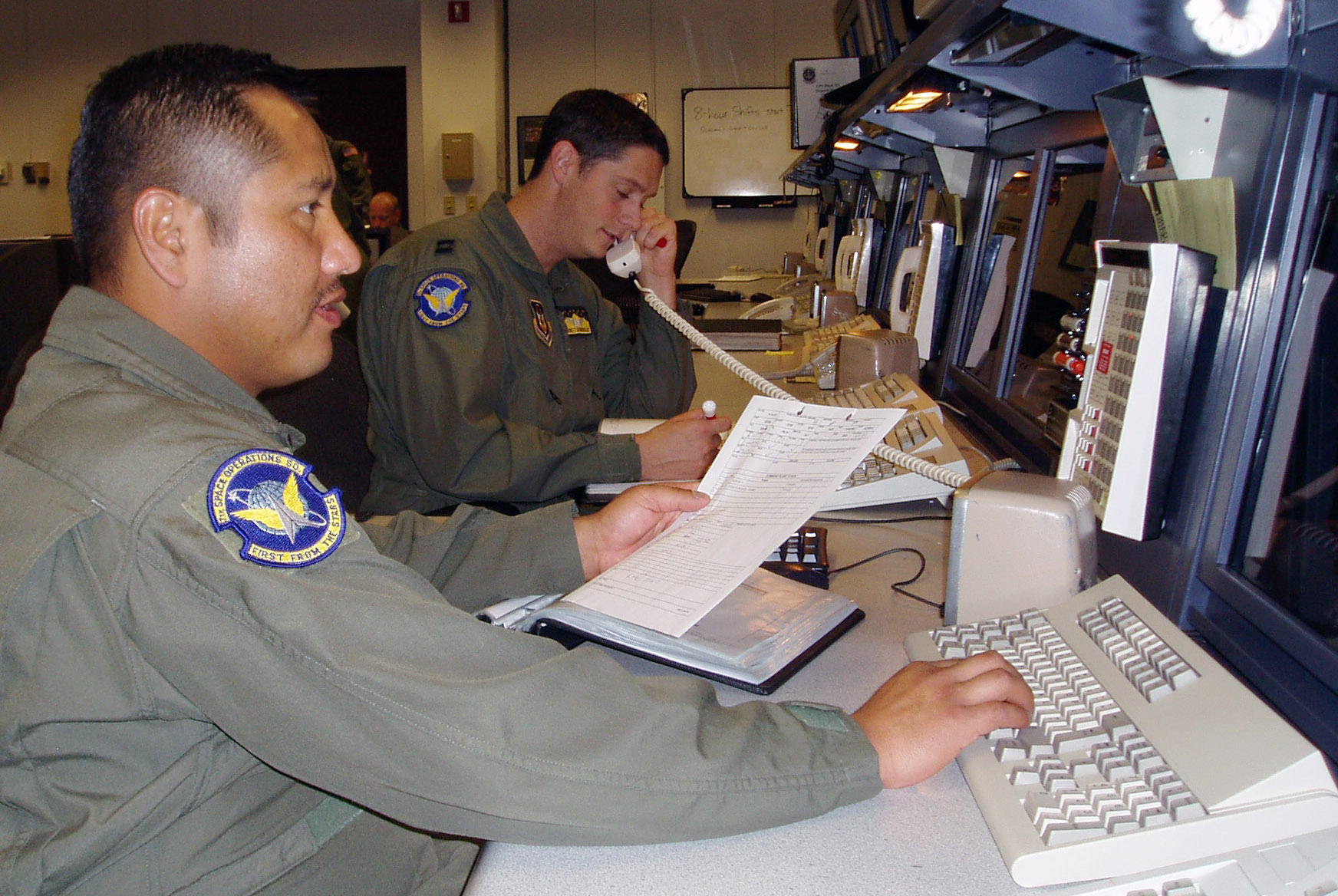
- Squadron members check the status of a satellite to ensure it is operating within normal parameters
- Active: 1942–1944; 1945–1949; 1949–1952; 1952–1954; 1969–1974; 1993–present
- Country: United States
- Branch: United States Air Force
- Role: Satellite control
- Part of: Air Force Reserve Command
- Garrison/HQ: Schriever AFB, Colorado
- Motto: First from the Stars
- Decorations: Air Force Outstanding Unit Award

Insignia
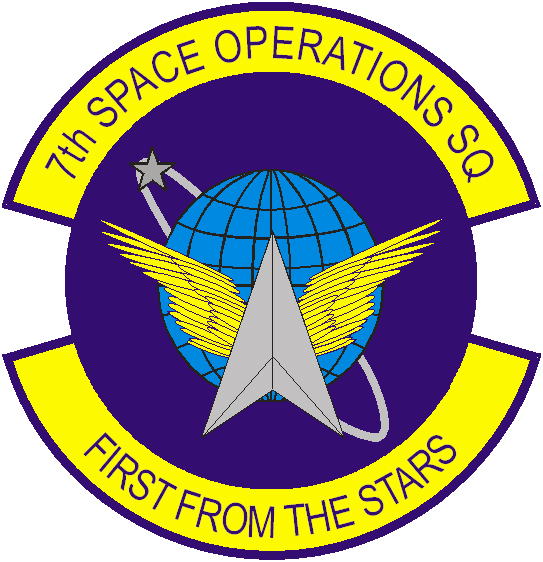
- 7th Space Operations Squadron emblem (approved 2 February 1994)

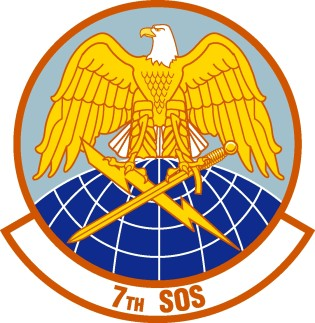
- 7th Special Operations Squadron emblem (Note: Flights were not authorized their own emblems when the 7th Special Operations Flight was active. The flight used the emblem of the 7th Special Operations Squadron with the flight designation on the tab on an unofficial basis.)

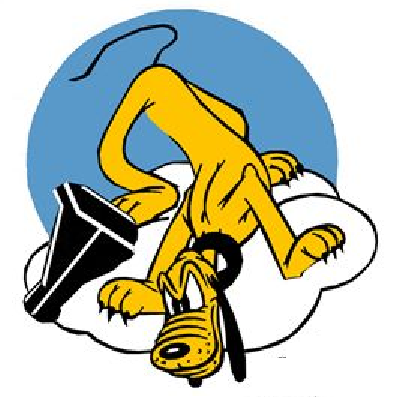
- 7th Photographic Reconnaissance Squadron emblem (World War II) (Note: The squadron apparently did not receive official approval for this design. Maurer, Combat Squadrons, p. 44 (no approved emblem).)

The United States Air Force's 7th Space Operations Squadron is an Air Force reserve space operations unit located at Schriever Air Force Base, Colorado.

== Mission ==
The 7th Space Operations Squadron is a reserve associate unit that is integrated with the 1st Space Operations Squadron in operating the Multi-Mission Space Operations Center, a one-of-a-kind satellite operations center focused on rapidly fielding space technologies for warfighters.

== History ==
=== World War II reconnaissance training ===
The first predecessor of the 7th Squadron was the 7th Photographic Reconnaissance Squadron which was activated on 28 January 1942, at MacDill Field, Florida and assigned directly to Third Air Force. After a brief period at Savannah, Georgia, where Eighth Air Force was building up for its move to the European Theater of Operations, the squadron moved to Colorado Springs, Colorado, where it became part of the 2d Photographic Group.

The squadron's primary mission was to train aircrews in photographic reconnaissance. The squadron was primarily equipped with the F-4 and F-5 reconnaissance versions of the Lockheed P-38 Lightning. In October 1943 the squadron moved with its parent 2d Group to Will Rogers Field, Oklahoma, where the Third Air Force Photographic Unit Training Center was located. The squadron was also called on to provide personnel for new reconnaissance units as they were activated. However, the Army Air Forces was finding that units like the 7th, based on rigid tables of organization were not well suited to the training mission. Accordingly, it reorganized its training activities into a functional system in which each base was organized into a separate numbered unit. On 1 May 1944, the unit was disbanded and its personnel and equipment, along with other photographic reconnaissance training and support units were used to form the 348th AAF Base Unit (Replacement Training Unit, Photo Reconnaissance).

=== Liaison in Europe, the Caribbean and the United States ===
The second predecessor of the squadron was the 7th Liaison Squadron, which was organized at Heidelberg, Germany as part of the occupation forces following World War II. At Heidelberg, the squadron replaced the 153d Liaison Squadron, which was inactivated a few weeks later in preparation for its transfer to the Mississippi National Guard. The 7th used light aircraft to provide courier and transportation services for personnel of the American occupation forces until it moved to the United States in June 1947. It performed similar services at March Air Force Base, California from September until it was inactivated on 28 March 1949.

The unit was again activated as the 7th Liaison Flight at Albrook Air Force Base, Panama Canal Zone in October 1949. There, it provided operations and logistical support for the Inter-American Geodetic Survey in the Panama Canal Zone. until inactivating again on 8 September 1952. Returning to squadron size, the 7th Liaison Squadron was activated the following month at Donaldson Air Force Base, South Carolina, where it flew De Havilland Canada L-20 Beavers until inactivating in June 1954.

=== Special operations ===
In the late 1960s, the United States drew down some of its forces in Europe. To continue meeting its commitments to NATO, the Department of Defense developed the concept of "dual based" units that would be stationed in the United States, but would be committed to augment NATO and would regularly exercise with other forces in Europe. As part of the withdrawal, the Helio U-10 Courier flight of the 7th Special Operations Squadron at Ramstein Air Base, Germany was used to organize the third predecessor of the squadron, the 7th Special Operations Flight at Otis Air Force Base, Massachusetts in July 1969. The flight operated the Couriers and, briefly, a Douglas C-47 Skytrain from Otis until May 1972.

That month, the flight moved on paper to Eglin Auxiliary FieId No. 9 (Hurlburt Field), Florida, where it was equipped with the Fairchild C-123 Provider. Shortly before its inactivation in April 1974, the squadron swapped its fixed wing aircraft for Bell UH-1 Hueys.

In 1985 the three squadrons were consolidated as the 27th Special Operations Squadron but the consolidated squadron remained inactive.

=== Space operations ===
The consolidated squadron was redesignated the 7th Space Operations Squadron and activated in the reserve at Falcon Air Force Base, Colorado, on 1 January 1993. The 7th was the first reserve squadron with a space mission to be activated. Prior to the squadron's activation, reservists who worked in space-related positions were individual reservists under the individual augmentee program. The squadron was first assigned to the 302d Airlift Wing at nearby Peterson Air Force Base, but by 1997. reserve space participation had grown and the squadron became part of the new 310th Space Group.

The previous mission for 7th was to augment space operation squadrons of the 50th Space Wing, specifically the 1st Space Operations Squadron. These activities included satellite emergencies, launch and early orbit, and satellite disposal for the Global Positioning System and Defense Support Program satellites. Up until 2007, the 7th operated the Midcourse Space Experiment satellite, Air Force Space Command's only space-based space surveillance asset and also performed booster launch operations mission, providing telemetry collection/data relay for Delta II launches.

=== Commanders ===
- Lt. Col Mark Stafford
- Lt. Col James Hogan
- Lt. Col Joshua Johnson
- Lt. Col Paul Loomis

== Lineage ==
7th Photographic Reconnaissance Squadron

- Constituted as the 7th Photographic Squadron on 19 January 1942

Activated on 28 January 1942
Redesignated 7th Photographic Reconnaissance Squadron on 9 June 1942
Redesignated 7th Photographic Squadron (Light) on 6 February 1943
Redesignated 7th Photographic Reconnaissance Squadron on 11 August 1943
Disbanded on 1 May 1944
Reconstituted and consolidated with the 7th Liaison Squadron and 7th Special Operations Flight as the 27th Special Operations Squadron on 19 September 1985

7th Liaison Squadron

- Constituted as the 7th Liaison Squadron on 3 November 1945

Activated on 10 December 1945
Inactivated on 28 March 1949

- Redesignated 7th Liaison Flight on 7 October 1949

Activated on 27 October 1949
Redesignated 7th Liaison Squadron on 8 September 1952
Inactivated on 18 June 1954
Consolidated with the 7th Photographic Reconnaissance Squadron and 7th Special Operations Flight as the 27th Special Operations Squadron on 19 September 1985

7th Special Operations Flight

- Constituted as the 7th Special Operations Flight on 18 March 1969

Activated on 1 July 1969
Inactivated on 30 April 1974
Consolidated with the 7th Photographic Reconnaissance Squadron and 7th Liaison Squadron as the 27th Special Operations Squadron on 19 September 1985

7th Space Operations Squadron

- 7th Photographic Reconnaissance Squadron, 7th Liaison Squadron and 7th Special Operations Flight consolidated as the 27th Special Operations Squadron on 19 September 1985
- Redesignated: 7th Space Operations Squadron and activated in the reserve on 1 January 1993

=== Assignments ===
- Third Air Force, 28 January 1942
- Eighth Air Force, 29 March 1942
- 2d Photographic Group (later 2d Photographic Reconnaissance and Mapping Group, 2d Photographic Reconnaissance Group), 7 May 1942 – 1 May 1944
- XII Tactical Air Command, 10 December 1945
- Headquarters Command, United States Air Forces in Europe, 10 March 1947
- Tactical Air Command, 25 June 1947 (attached to 300 Army Air Forces Base Unit) (Note: The 300th AAF Base Unit was Headquarters, Tactical Air Command.)
- 1st Fighter Wing, 1 September 1947 – 28 March 1949
- 5700th Air Base Group, 27 October 1949 – 8 September 1952
- Eighteenth Air Force, 20 October 1952 – 18 June 1954 (attached to 64th Troop Carrier Group until 9 January 1953)
- 1st Special Operations Wing, 1 July 1969
- 317th Special Operations Squadron, 31 May 1972 – 30 April 1974
- 302d Airlift Wing, 1 January 1993
- 302d Operations Group, 1 May 1993
- 310th Space Group, 1 September 1997
- 310th Operations Group, 7 Mar 2008 – present

=== Stations ===
- MacDill Field, Florida, 28 January 1942
- Savannah, Georgia, 27 February 1942
- Army Air Base, Colorado Springs (later Peterson Field), Colorado, 15 May 1942
- Will Rogers Field, Oklahoma, 10 October 1943 – 1 May 1944
- Heidelberg, Germany, 10 December 1945
- Pfaffengrund, Germany, 1 January–25 June 1947
- Langley Field, Virginia, 25 June 1947
- March Field (later March Air Force Base), California, 1 September 1947 – 28 March 1949
- Albrook Air Force Base, Panama Canal Zone, 27 October 1949 – 8 September 1952
- Donaldson Air Force Base, South Carolina, 20 October 1952 – 18 June 1954
- Otis Air Force Base, Massachusetts, 1 July 1969
- Eglin Auxiliary FieId No. 9 (Hurlburt Field), Florida, 31 May 1972 – 30 April 1974
- Falcon Air Force Base (later Schriever Air Force Base), Colorado, 1 January 1993 – present

=== Aircraft & Spacecraft ===
- Lockheed P-38 Lightning (1942–1944)
- Lockheed F-4 Lightning (1942–1944)
- Lockheed F-5 Lightning (1942–1944)
- North American B-25 Mitchell (1942–1944)
- North American F-10 Mitchell (1942–1944)
- Stinson L-5 Sentinel (1946–1947, 1948, 1949–1952)
- Stinson L-13 (1947–1948)
- De Havilland Canada L-20 Beaver (1952–1954)
- Piper L-4 Grasshopper (1948–1949)
- Douglas C-47 Skytrain (1969–1970)
- Helio U-10 Courier (1969–1971)
- Fairchild C-123 Provider (1970–1973)
- Bell UH-1 Huey (1971, 1974)
- Defense Support Program (1993–2007)
- Global Positioning System (1993–2007)
- Midcourse Space Experiment (unknown-2008)
