= 57th Air Division =

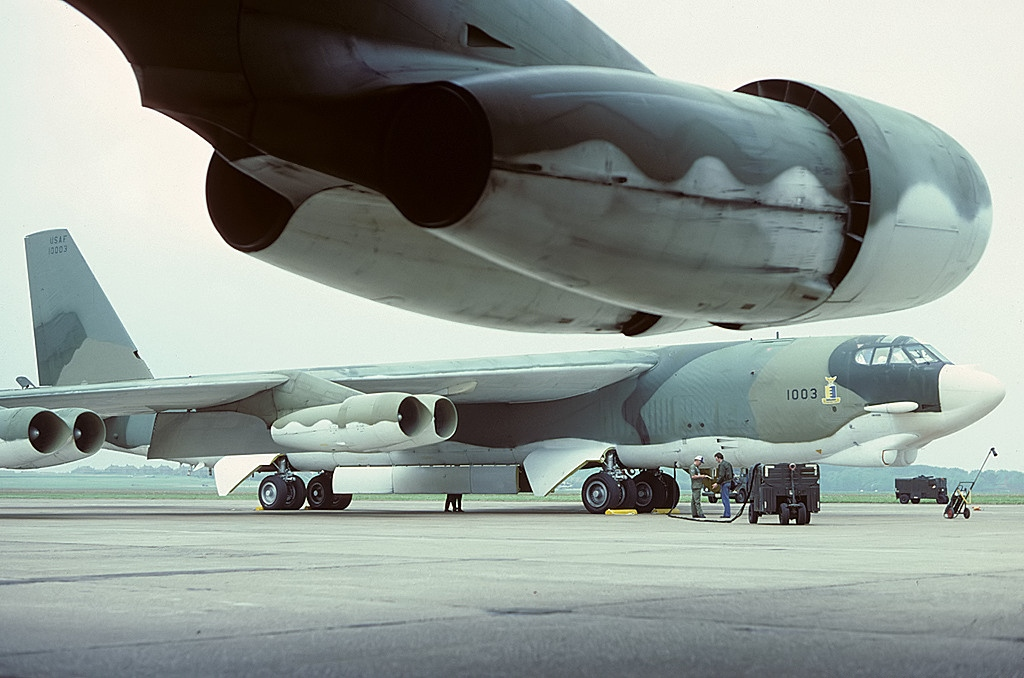
- B-52H Stratofortress of the division's 28th Bombardment Wing
- Active: 1940–1941; 1942–1945; 1951–1969; 1975–1991
- Country: United States
- Branch: United States Air Force
- Role: Command of strategic strike forces
- Engagements: Mediterranean Theater of Operations

Insignia
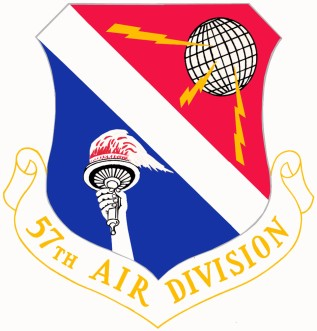
- 57th Air Division emblem (Note: Approved 7 April 1954.) (Note: Heraldic description: Per bend azure and gules, a bend argent between in chief a globe of the third (color) lined sable emitting three lightning flashes or and issuing from base a hand holding a torch of the fourth (color) garnished of the fifth (color) flammant of the second (color)and silver.)

The 57th Air Division is an inactive United States Air Force unit. Its last assignment was with the Fifteenth Air Force, based at Minot Air Force Base, North Dakota. It was inactivated on 24 June 1991.

== History ==
"Established as the 8th Pursuit Wing, it conducted training from 1940 to 1941. As a paper unit, it moved to India and then to Egypt in December 1942."

It finally gained personnel and aircraft, and became operational as the 57 Bombardment Wing in March 1944. "Initially, the 57th flew close air support missions against enemy troops and gun emplacements in the vicinity of Anzio, Italy; later, it flew bombing missions against railway marshalling yards at Foligno, Littoria, and Terni, Italy. Between 19 March 1944 and 11 May 1944 the 57th took part in Operation Strangle to destroy Italian marshalling yards, railroad repair facilities and other rail targets such as bridges, tunnels, and viaducts. It continued to fly close air support and interdiction missions in Italy throughout the war, and supported the invasion of southern France on 15 August 1944." The unit was inactivated at the end of the war.

Reactivated as an intermediate command echelon of Strategic Air Command in 1951, the 57th Air Division assumed a supervisory role of subordinate bombardment units. "Its units trained to conduct long range bombardment, air refueling, and strategic reconnaissance operations around the world. Between 1965 and 1969, division units supported Operation Arc Light bombing and Operation Young Tiger air refueling operations in Southeast Asia. In 1980 the 57th reorganized to employ Strategic Air Command conventional strategic forces (bomber, tanker, and reconnaissance) in crisis situations worldwide."

It was inactivated in June 1991 due to budget constraints and the reduction of forces after the end of the Cold War.

== Lineage ==
- Established as the 8th Pursuit Wing on 19 October 1940

Activated on 6 November 1940
Inactivated on 1 November 1941

- Redesignated 8th Fighter Wing on 6 July 1942

Activated on 24 July 1942
Redesignated 57th Bombardment Wing on 6 April 1943
Inactivated on 12 September 1945

- Redesignated 57th Air Division on 10 April 1951

Organized on 16 April 1951
Discontinued on 16 June 1952
Inactivated on 16 June 1952

- Activated on 16 June 1952

Inactivated on 2 July 1969

- Activated on 22 January 1975

Inactivated on 14 June 1991

=== Assignments ===
- General Headquarters Air Force, 6 November 1940
- Southeast Air District (later Third Air Force), 16 January 1941
- Interceptor Command (of Third Air Force), 21 April 1941
- III Interceptor Command, c. 1 July – 1 November 1941
- IX Fighter Command, 24 July 1942

Attached to III Fighter Command, 26 July – c. 28 October 1942

- Ninth Air Force, 22 December 1942

Attached to IX Fighter Command, 22 December 1942 unknown 1943

- Twelfth Air Force, c. 23 August 1943
- XII Air Support Command, 31 August 1943
- XII Bomber Command, 1 January 1944
- Twelfth Air Force, 1 March 1944
- Army Air Forces Service Command, Mediterranean Theater of Operations, 15 August – 12 September 1945
- Fifteenth Air Force, 16 April 1951 16 June 1952
- Fifteenth Air Force, 16 June 1952
- Eighth Air Force, 4 September 1956 2 July 1969
- Fifteenth Air Force, 22 January 1975 14 June 1991

=== Components ===
==== Wings ====
Bombardment Wings
5th Bombardment Wing: 22 January 1975 – 14 June 1991
17th Bombardment Wing: 1 July 1965 – 2 July 1968
19th Bombardment Wing: 25 July 1968 – 2 July 1969
28th Bombardment Wing: 1 May 1982 – 23 January 1987
68th Bombardment Wing: 1 July 1964 – 1 July 1965; attached 10 August – 1 September 1966, assigned 2 September 1966 – 2 July 1969.
92d Bombardment Wing: 16 April 1951 – 16 June 1952. 16 June 1952 – 4 September 1956 (detached 14 October 1954 – 12 January 1955 and 26 April – 6 July 1956); 23 January 1987 – 15 June 1988
98th Bombardment Wing: 16 April 1951 – 16 June 1952 (detached 16 April 1951 – 16 June 1952). 16 June 1952 – 25 November 1953 (detached entire period)
99th Bombardment Wing (see 99th Strategic Reconnaissance Wing)
111th Bombardment Wing (later 111 Strategic Reconnaissance Wing): 21 April 1951 – 1 January 1953
319th Bombardment Wing: 22 January 1975 – 1 May 1982;
416th Bombardment Wing: 2 July – 2 September 1966 (detached 10 August – 2 September 1966)
465th Bombardment Wing: attached 10 August – 1 September 1966, assigned 2 September 1966 – 25 July 1968
499th Air Refueling Wing: 1 January 1963 – 25 June 1966

Strategic Missile Wings
44th Strategic Missile Wing: 1 May 1982 – 23 January 1987
91st Strategic Missile Wing: 22 January 1975 – 14 June 1991
321st Strategic Missile Wing: 22 January 1975 – 1 May 1982; 23 January 1987 – 16 June 1988

Air Refueling Wings
301st Air Refueling Wing: 15 November 1965 – 2 July 1966
4050th Air Refueling Wing: 4 September 1956 – 1 January 1963

Reconnaissance Wings
55th Strategic Reconnaissance Wing: 1 April 1980 – 1 October 1982
99th Strategic Reconnaissance Wing (later 99th Bombardment Wing): 1 January 1953 – 2 July 1969 (detached 29 January – 25 April 1956; c. 1 October 1967-c. 1 April 1968 and c. 23 September 1968-c. 1 April 1969)
111th Strategic Reconnaissance Wing (see 111th Bombardment Wing)

==== Groups ====
- 12th Bombardment Group: 1 November 1943 – 1 January 1944 (detached 1 November 1943 – 1 January 1944)

47th Bombardment Group: 6 October – 10 December 1943 (detached entire period)
49th Pursuit Group: 24 May – 2 October 1941 (detached 6 August – 2 October 1941)
57th Fighter Group: 1 November 1943 – 1 January 1944 (detached entire period)
79th Fighter Group: 1 November 1943 – 1 January 1944 (detached entire period)
310th Bombardment Group: 15 March 1944 – 12 September 1945 (detached 20 August – 12 September 1945)
319th Bombardment Group: 10 November 1944 – 10 January 1945
321st Bombardment Group: 1 November 1943 – 1 January 1944 (detached 4 November 1943 – 1 January 1944) 1 March 1944 – 12 September 1945 (detached 20 August – 12 September 1945)
340th Bombardment Group: 1 November 1943 – 1 January 1944 (detached 1 November 1943 – 1 January 1944); 1 March 1944 – 26 July 1945

=== Stations ===
- Maxwell Field, Alabama, 6 November 1940
- Army Air Base, West Palm Beach (later Morrison Field), Florida, 16 May – 1 November 1941
- Drew Field, Florida, 24 July – 29 October 1942
- Bombay Airport, India, 29 November 1942
- Deolali, India, 3 December 1942
- Port Tewfik (Suez), Egypt, 22 December 1942
- Landing Ground 91 (near Cairo), Egypt, 23 December 1942
- RAF Kabrit, Egypt, 12 February 1943
- RAF Deversoir, Egypt, 5 June 1943
- Tunis, Tunisia, 28 August 1943
- Lentini, Sicily, 4 September 1943
- Capodichino Airport, Italy, 7 October 1943
- Foggia Airfield, Italy, 29 October 1943
- Pollena Trocchia, Italy, 4 January 1944
- Ghisonaccia Airfield, Corsica, 20 April 1944
- Migliacharo, Corsica, c. 5 October 1944
- Fano Airfield, Italy, 7 April 1945
- Pomigliano Airfield, Italy, 23 August – 12 September 1945
- Fairchild Air Force Base, Washington, 16 April 1951
- Westover Air Force Base, Massachusetts, 4 September 1956 – 2 July 1969
- Minot Air Force Base, North Dakota, 22 January 1975 – 14 June 1991

=== Campaigns ===
- Campaign Streamers: World War II: Naples Foggia (Air); Rome Arno

=== Aircraft and missiles ===
- Seversky P-35, 1941;
- Curtiss P-40 Warhawk, 1941.
- North American B-25 Mitchell, 1941–1945;
- Martin B-26 Marauder, 1944.
- Douglas B-26 Invader, 1951;
- Boeing B-29 Superfortress, 1951–1952;
- Boeing RB-29 Superfortress, 1951–1952;
- Convair B-36 Peacemaker, 1951–1954, 1954–1956;
- Convair RB-36 Peacemaker], 1952–1956;
- Convair GRB-36 Peacemaker, 1955–1956;
- Republic RF-84F Thunderflash, 1955–1956;
- Boeing B-52 Stratofortress, 1956–1969, 1975–1991;
- Boeing KC-97 Stratofreighter, 1956–1965;
- Boeing KC-135 Stratotanker, 1957–1969, 1975–1991;
- Boeing EC-135 Looking Glass, 1964–1969.
- Minuteman III, 1975–1991;
- Boeing C-135 Stratolifter, 1980–1982;
- Boeing E-4, 1980–1982;
- EC-135 Looking Glass, 1980–1982;
- Boeing RC-135 Cobra Ball, 1980–1982;
- LGM-30F Minuteman II, 1982–1987.

== See also ==
- List of United States Air Force air divisions
