= Skikda Airport =

Airport in Algeria

- IATA: SKI; ICAO: DABP

Summary
- Airport type: Closed
- Serves: Skikda, Algeria
- Elevation AMSL: 27 ft (8.2 m)
- Coordinates: 36°51′45.8″N 6°57′3.9″E

Map
- Location of Skikda Airport in Algeria

Runways
Direction	Length		Surface
Direction	ft	m	Surface
Closed
- Source:World Aero Data

Skikda Airport was an airport in Algeria (IATA: SKI, ICAO: DABP), located approximately 5 km east of Skikda; about 60 km north-northeast of Constantine.

The 1,478 metres (4,849 ft) asphalt runway was closed sometime prior to 2004. The area is overbuilt and used as storage for construction materials.

== World War II ==
During World War II, the facility was known as "Philippeville Airfield". It was a major Twelfth Air Force base of operations during the North African Campaign against the German Afrika Korps. The 310th Bombardment Group flew B-25 Mitchells from the airfield between 10 November-10 December 1943.

== See also ==
- Transport in Algeria
- List of airports in Algeria
