= Dar el Koudia Airfield =

World War II airfield in Tunisia

Dar el Koudia Airfield
- Part of Twelfth Air Force

Site information
- Type: Military airfield
- Controlled by: United States Army Air Forces

Location
- Coordinates: 37°17′21.04″N 009°52′08.89″E

Site history
- Built: 1943
- In use: 1943

Location of Bizerte Airfield, Tunisia

Dar el Koudia Airfield is an abandoned World War II military airfield in Tunisia, in the vicinity of Bizerte. It was used by the United States Army Air Force Twelfth Air Force during the North African Campaign. The airfield was used by the 310th Bombardment Group, flying B-25 Mitchells from the field between 6 June and 5 August 1943.

Today, the location of the airfield is undetermined, as urban expansion in the Bizerte area has erased evidence of its existence.
