= Pomigliano Airfield =

Former airfield in southern Italy (1938-1960s)

Coordinates: 40°55′40″N 14°23′20″E

Pomigliano Airfield was a military airfield and base established in 1938–39 in Pomigliano d'Arco, southern Italy near Naples. It was attacked on several occasions by the United States Army Air Force. The airfield was later used by the USAAF Twelfth Air Force during the Italian campaign.

Major USAAF units stationed at the airfield were:

- HQ, XXII Tactical Air Command, August-4 October 1945
- HQ, 57th Bombardment Wing, 23 August-12 September 1945
- HQ, 62d Fighter Wing, August-12 September 1945
- 310th Bombardment Group, 15 August–12 September 1945, B-25 Mitchell
- 321st Bombardment Group, September 1945, B-25 Mitchell
- 27th Fighter Bomber Group, 19 January 1944 – 10 April 1944
- 31st Fighter Group, 14 October 1943 – 14 October 1943, Spitfire
- 79th Fighter Group, 1 May–June 1944
- 86th Fighter-Bomber Group, 19 November 1943 – 30 April 1944, A-36 Apache
- 3d Reconnaissance Group, 4 January-16 June 1944 (various photo-recon aircraft)
- 60th Troop Carrier Group, 8 October 1944 – 23 May 1945, C-47 Skytrain

After the war the airfield was used for aviation development, and in the late 1960s the new Alfasud automobile factory was built on the site, which obliterated all traces of the airfield.
