= Fano Airfield =

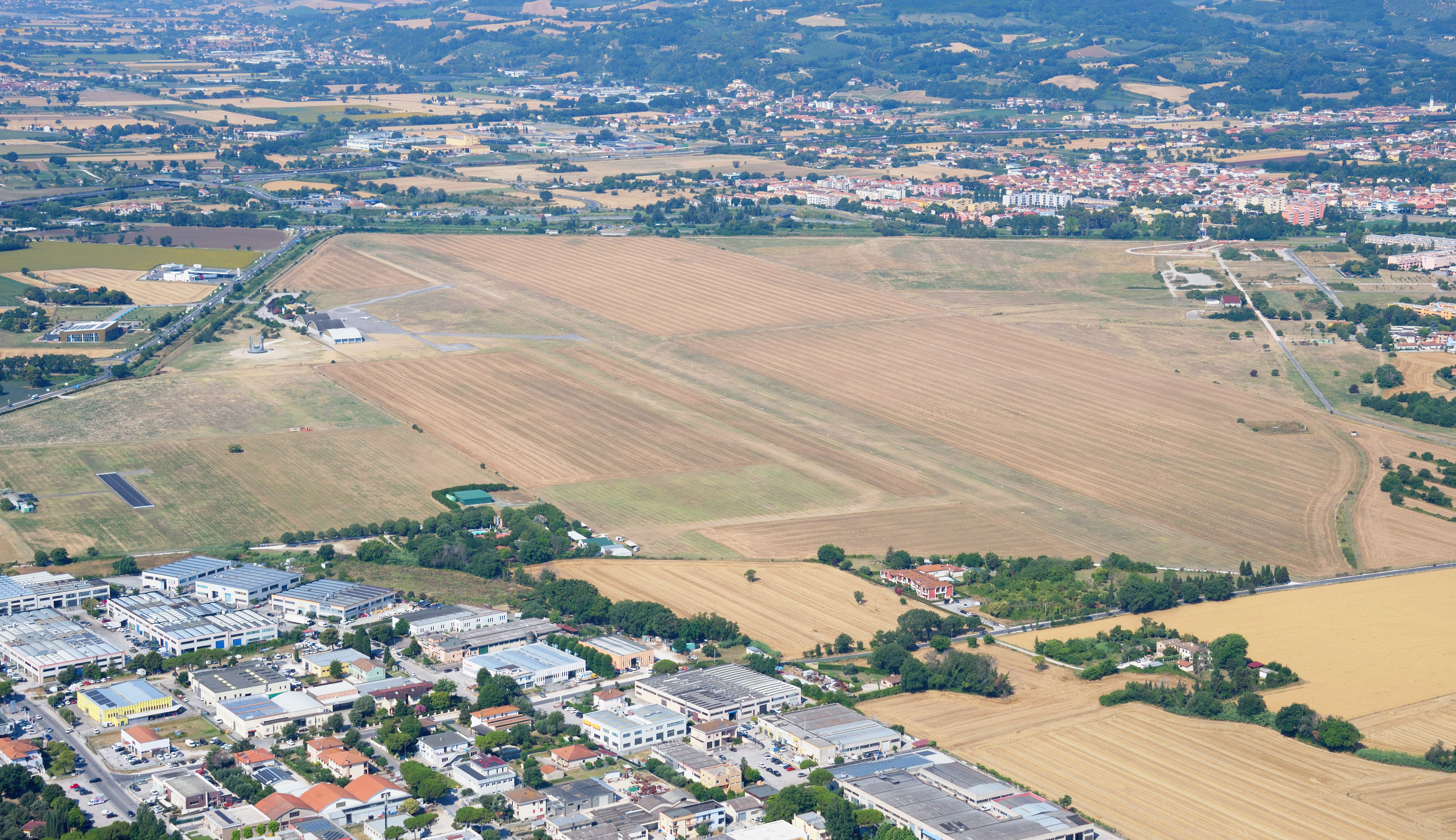
- IATA: none; ICAO: LIDF

Summary
- Airport type: Public
- Location: Fano, Italy
- Coordinates: 43°49′25.62″N 013°01′32.09″E

Map
- Location within Italy
- Source:World Aero Data

Fano Airport is a recreational aerodrome in Italy (ICAO: LIDF), located 1 kilometre (0.6 mi) southeast of Fano and 10 km (6 mi) northwest of Mondolfo in the province of Pesaro and Urbino in the Marche region of Italy.

The aerodrome is used for general aviation, with no commercial airline service.

== History ==
The origins of Fano Airport date back to World War I. In January 1917, the Italian Military Aviation Directorate requested the establishment of a 400 × 120m landing ground near Fano, and a site at the Tomba Grande estate was selected and prepared. After the war, proposals to expand the airfield met opposition from local landowners and farmers, who objected to the loss of productive agricultural land. Alternative locations were considered but ultimately abandoned because of land ownership issues, and the project remained on municipally owned land near the original landing field.

In 1930, the Italian government designated Fano as a campo di fortuna ("auxiliary airfield"). On 22 January 1930, a ministerial decree formally established the airfield and imposed aeronautical restrictions on the surrounding area. In May of that year, the Municipality of Fano granted the Ministry of Aeronautics the free use of a 27-hectare site for thirty years and undertook extensive works to prepare the airfield, including levelling the ground, removing buildings and vegetation, installing landing markers and signal towers, and constructing access roads. The airfield was officially inaugurated on 20 July 1930.

During the early 1930s, the airport hosted stopovers associated with the Giro Aereo d'Italia (Tour of Italy Air Race), although its economic benefits for the city were limited. Contemporary municipal records indicate recurring disputes over financial obligations, including unpaid government rents, maintenance costs, and staffing arrangements. Local authorities also repeatedly sought to secure a permanent military aviation presence, but proposals for training schools or military installations were initially rejected by the Ministry of Aeronautics.

In 1936, the Ministry began examining plans to expand the military airfield. Following a decision in early 1937 to establish a second-stage pilot training school at Fano, a major construction programme was approved with the aim of enlarging the airfield to approximately its present extent.

=== World War II ===
A main period of the airfield was between 1940 and 1943 during World War II. The United States Army Corps of Engineers converted it into a temporary wartime airfield with a hard earth or pierced steel planking (PSP) runway and parking apron. With few or no permanent structures, tents were used for ground support operations and personnel billeting. It was used as an operational airfield by the USAAF Twelfth and Fifteenth Air Forces in late 1944 and in 1945 until the end of the war. With the withdrawal of the US forces, the facility was turned over to the local government in late 1945.

==== Units assigned ====
- 79th Fighter Group, 5 December 1944 – 20 March 1945 (P-47 Thunderbolt)
- 310th Bombardment Group, 7 April-12 August 1945 (B-25 Mitchell)
- 57th Bombardment Wing, 7 April–September 1945
- 306th Fighter Wing, 5 March-15 July 1945

=== Post World War II ===
The airfield reopened after the war with an Aero Club flight school.
