= 415th Special Operations Squadron =

415th Special Operations Squadron

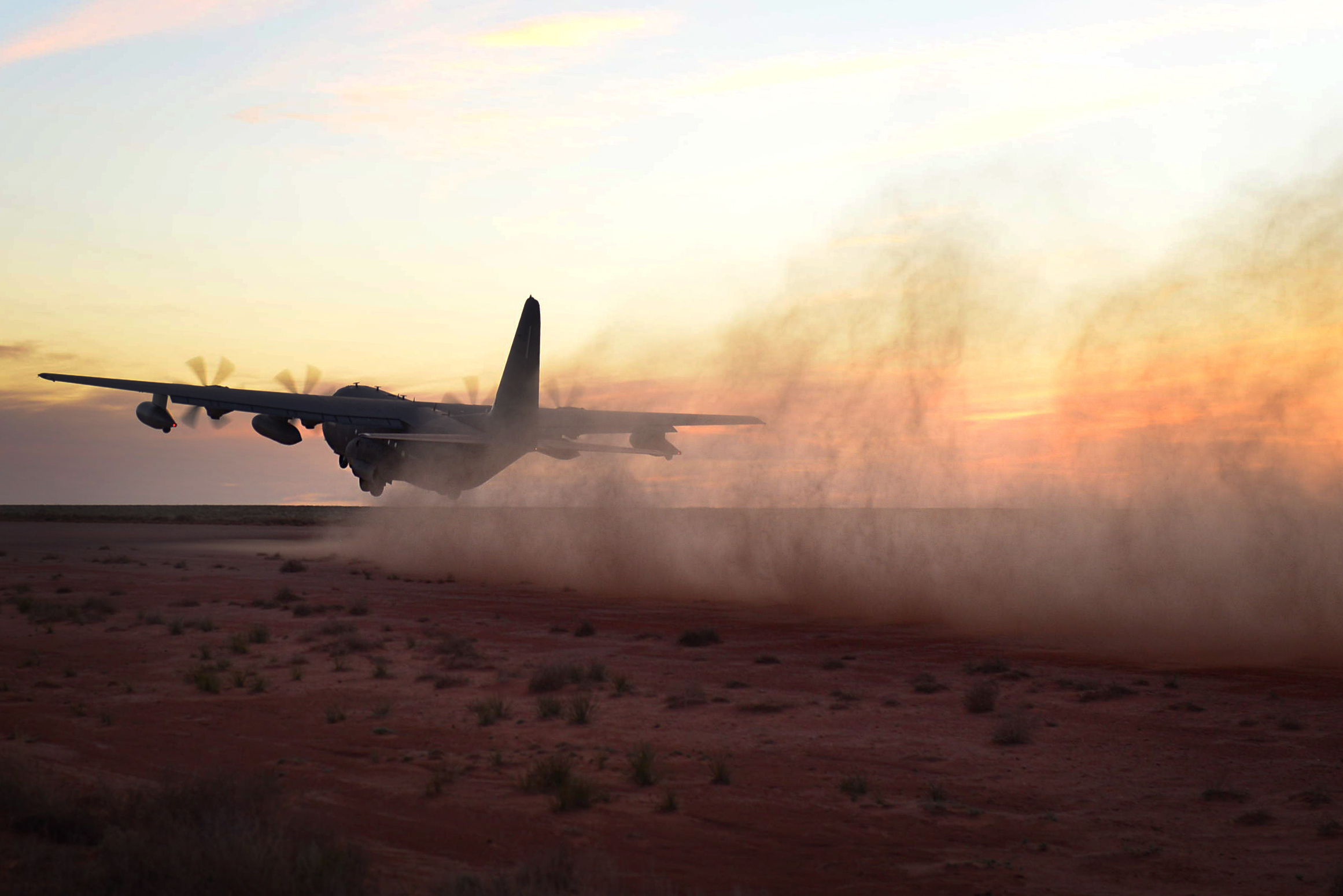
- MC-130J Commando II taking off from the Melrose Range, NM
- Active: 1943–1947; 1970–1975; 1989–1993; 2011–present
- Country: United States
- Branch: United States Air Force
- Role: Special Operations Training
- Part of: Air Education and Training Command
- Garrison/HQ: Kirtland AFB, New Mexico
- Engagements: Mediterranean Theater of Operations 1991 Gulf War (Defense of Saudi Arabia; Liberation of Kuwait)

- Decorations: Air Force Outstanding Unit Award (2x)

Insignia
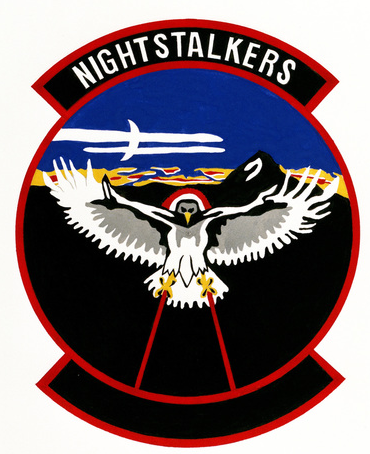
- 415th Special Operations Squadron emblem (approved 19 April 1990)

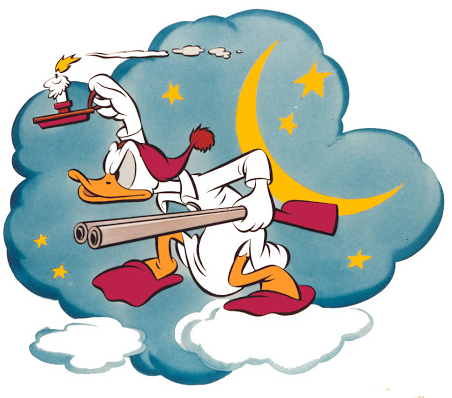
- 415th Night Fighter Squadron emblem (approved 4 December 1943)

The 415th Special Operations Squadron is a United States Air Force unit. It is assigned to the 58th Operations Group at Kirtland Air Force Base, New Mexico.

The 415th Night Fighter Squadron was formed in February 1943, and it carried out missions in the Mediterranean Theatre of Operations, and then in northwestern Europe during World War II. It was inactivated in 1947, with its personnel and aircraft being transferred to another squadron.

Reactivated in 2011, the squadron replaced the 58th Special Operations Wing, Detachment 1. Its mission is to train special operations personnel operating both the HC-130J Combat King II and the MC-130J Commando II.

== History ==
=== World War II ===
During World War II, the 415th Night Fighter Squadron was activated on 10 February 1943. At that time, the squadron was assigned to the Army Air Forces School of Applied Tactics for training in the P-70 night fighter, a converted Douglas A-20 Havoc medium bomber. That training included daylight and nighttime air interceptions, ground-controlled interception, navigation, and instrument flying.

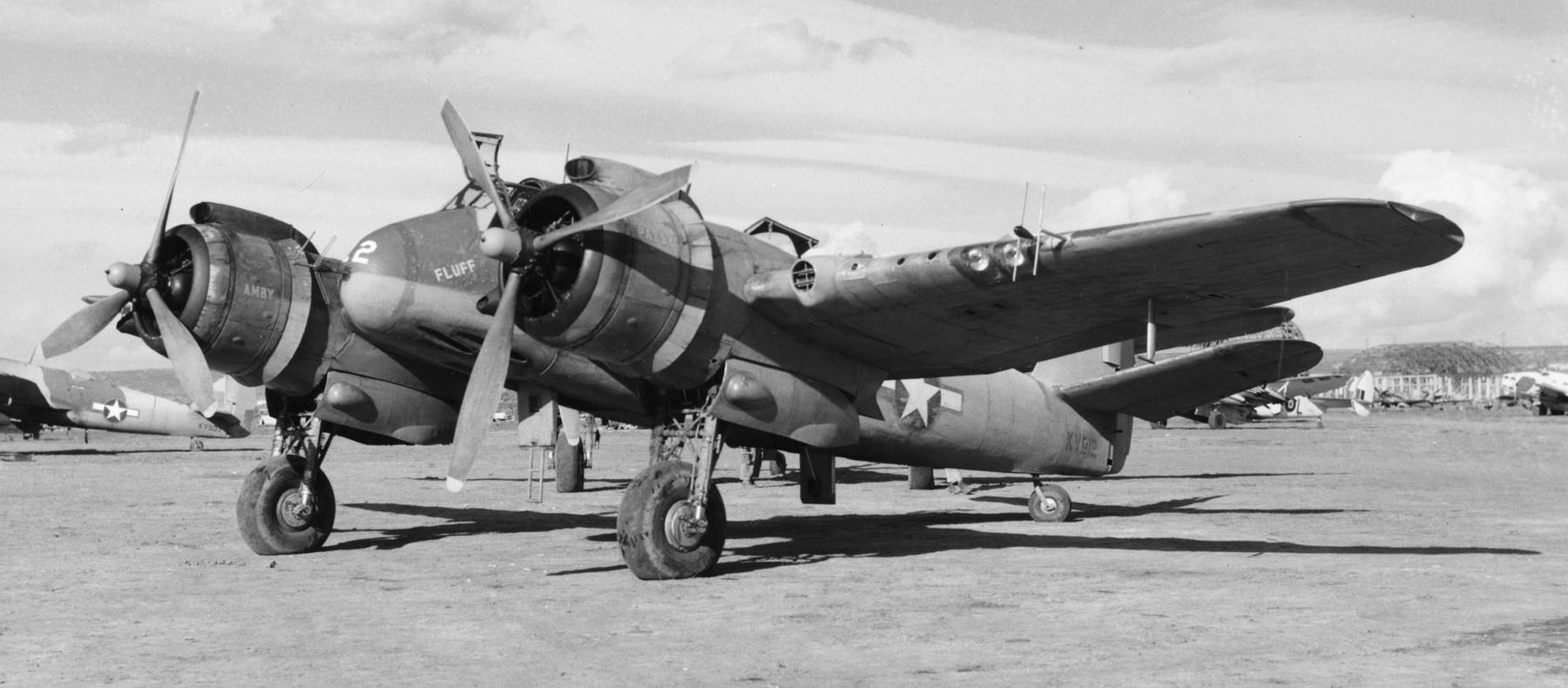
a Beaufighter of the 415th Squadron

On 3 March 1943, the air echelon from the unit left Florida. Twenty days later, the echelon sailed on the RMS Empress of Scotland, and arrived in England on 31 March. There, the pilots, engineers, and radar operators trained separately until May 1943, when all parts of the air echelon moved to RAF Ayr, Scotland, for training as a complete unit. The ground component moved from Florida on 22 April 1943 to Camp Kilmer, New Jersey, and it left there a week later on the transport ship USAT "Shawnee" for North Africa. It arrived at Oran, Algeria, on 11 May 1943 to begin working and training at the nearby La Senia Airfield. In June 1943, the ground component moved to Tunisia, where it worked with a Royal Air Force night fighter squadron. The air echelon joined the ground troops in early July at Monastir Airfield, Tunisia.

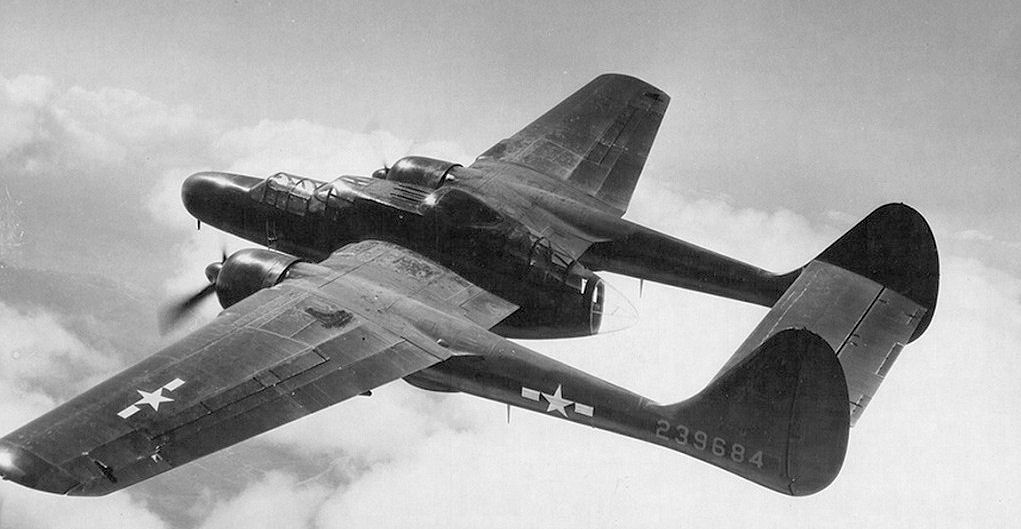
415th Night Fighter Squadron Northrop P-61 Black Widow

The 415th Squadron entered combat as a unit in July 1943, flying British-made Bristol Beaufighter aircraft. The squadron's pilots flew convoy patrols, night patrols, and interception scrambles. As its first important mission, the 415th squadron flew escort missions for the airborne invasion of Sicily in July 1943. The squadron was moved to Sicily in early September, and later to the mainland of Italy in December as the Allies continued gain ground on the Axis powers. In Italy, the squadron continued its patrols, and it flew night cover over the Anzio beachhead during January and February 1944.

In July 1944, the squadron moved again to Corsica to take part in the pending Operation Dragoon, the invasion of Southern France. This invasion occurred in August, and the 415th again flew night patrols covering the beachheads. After the Allied ground forces established beachheads, the squadron moved into Southern France, where it supported the U.S 7th Army and the French 1st Army with night interception and anti-night-intruder sorties. The pilots also patrolled the lines at St. Die, and it dropped flares to light up targets for the artillery. Through April 1945, the squadron flew patrols and intruder missions, concentrating its attacks on enemy installations, supplies, communications, and troops.

The 415th squadron took part in the Allied invasion of Germany, moving to Braunshardt Airfield, Germany, where it moved from the Beaufighter to the new American nightfighter, the Northrop P-61 Black Widow. The squadron only flew a few missions in this new fighter before the war ended. With the Fall of Germany, the squadron became a part of the United States Air Forces in Europe army of occupation. It moved to AAF Station Nordholz, Germany, in October 1945, remaining there until February 1946, when it returned to the United States.

=== Postwar Era ===
When arriving at Bolling Field, DC, the squadron returned without people and equipment, and then moved to Shaw Field, South Carolina. The unit remained unmanned through July 1946, when new pilots with P-61s and North American B-25 Mitchells arrived. It resumed its training in night fighter techniques until May 1947, when the squadron was reassigned to Alaskan Air Command, and was stationed at Adak Army Air Field to defend the Aleutian Islands. The squadron flew training patrols until being inactivated on 1 September 1947, with its personnel and aircraft being transferred to the 449th Fighter Squadron (All Weather), upon inactivation.

=== Special operations training ===
During the final phases of the War in Southeast Asia, the 415th was redesignated the 415th Special Operations Training Squadron, as a component of the 1st Special Operations Wing to replace the 4413th Combat Crew Training Squadron at Hurlburt Field, Florida.

There, the squadron provided special operations combat training for aircrews in the AC-119G Shadow gunship. In early 1971, the unit additionally acquired AC-130H Spectre gunships. It also gave numerous displays and firepower demonstrations of its capabilities. In October 1972, the squadron transferred its AC-119s to the Republic of Vietnam Air Force. However, the 415th squadron continued its training mission until 30 June 1975 when it was inactivated a second time.

=== F-117 operations ===
==== Background ====
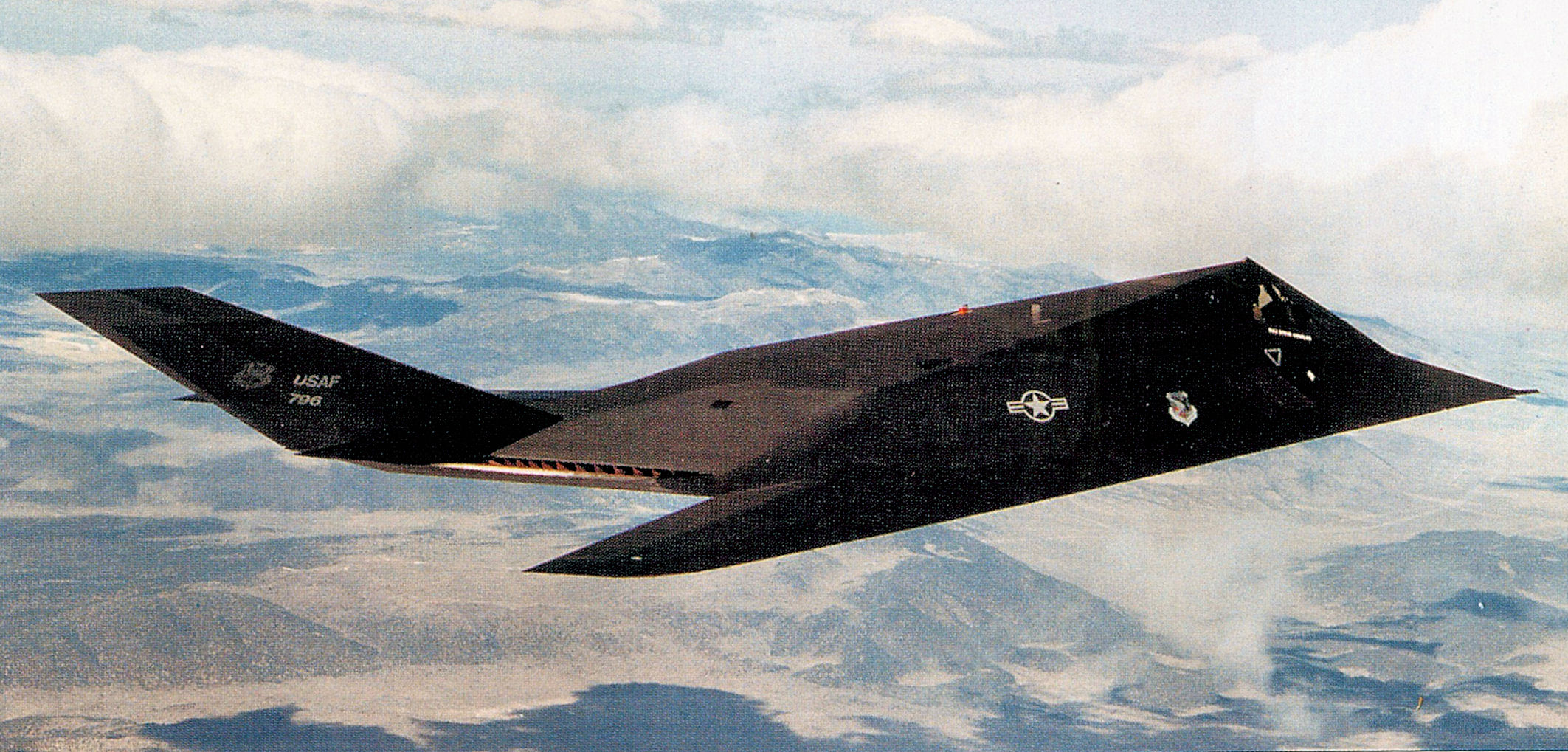
4450th Tactical Squadron Lockheed F-117A Nighthawk 81–10796 in flight, 1990

Tactical Air Command activated the "I-Unit" at Groom Lake, Nevada as a classified unit on 5 October 1979. "I-Unit" was component of Tactical Air Command's A-Unit. It began receiving full-scale development F-117A stealth fighters from Lockheed Aircraft for testing. The unit was redesignated the 4450th Tactical Squadron on 11 July 1981 as part of the 4450th Tactical Group. The squadron moved to Tonopah Test Range Airport on 28 October 1983, performing training missions with the F-117A in a clandestine environment. All Tonopah training flights were conducted at night under the cover of darkness until late 1988. On 10 November 1988, the U.S. Air Force brought the F-117A from behind a "black veil" by publicly acknowledging its existence, but the USAF provided few details about it. The official confirmation of the existence of the F-117A, however, had little impact on Tonopah operations. Pilots began occasionally flying the F-117A during the day, but personnel were still ferried to and from work each Monday and Friday from Nellis Air Force Base. Everyone associated with the project was still forbidden to talk about what they did for a living, and the program remained shrouded in secrecy.

==== Reactivation as a fighter unit ====
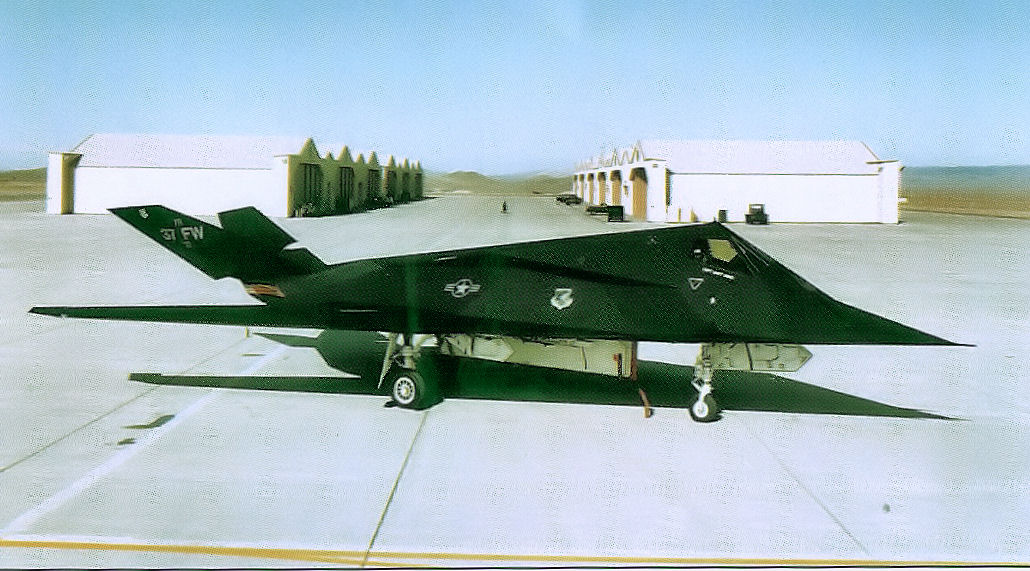
F-117A Nighthawk 84–0827 on the ramp at Tonopah TTR Airport, just before its transfer to Holloman AFB, New Mexico.

The 4450th Tactical Group was inactivated on 5 October 1989, and the 4450th Squadron transferred its mission, personnel and F-117s to the 415th Tactical Fighter Squadron as the 37th Tactical Fighter Wing replaced the 4450th Group, and the 415th became one of two operational F-117A Stealth Fighter squadrons.

On 19 December 1989, just over two months after being reactivated, the F-117 was deployed into combat for the first time. This was in Operation Just Cause, the invasion of Panama intended to dislodge and arrest General Manuel Noriega. At the beginning of the invasion, six F-117As flew to Panama from Tonopah. Their mission was to drop 2000-pound bombs near the Panama Defense Forces barracks at Rio Hato. The purpose of these bomb drops was to stun and disorient the PDF troops living there so that the barracks could be stormed and the troops captured with minimal resistance and casualties. The pilots were instructed to drop their bombs no closer than 50 meters from two separate PDF barracks buildings. On the night of 19 December, two lead F-117As each dropped a conventional 2000-pound bomb on the Rio Hato barracks.

Less than a year later, in response to the Iraqi invasion of Kuwait on 2 August 1990, the 415th deployed to King Khalid Air Base in the south-west of Saudi Arabia, near Khamis Mushait on 19 August 1990. On 17 January 1991, coalition forces began an air offensive to eject Iraqi troops from Kuwait. In the early morning hours, the F-117As of the 37th Wing initiated the air war against Iraq. Mission planners had assigned critical strategic Iraqi command and control installations to the F-117A, counting on the aircraft's ability to hit precisely at well-defended targets without being seen. Other vital targets included key communications centers, research and development facilities for nuclear and chemical weapons, plus hardened aircraft shelters on Iraqi airfields. On the first night of the war, an F-117A dropped a 2000-pound laser-guided GBU-27 Paveway III bomb right through the roof of the general communications building in downtown Baghdad. In another attack on the communications building next to the Tigris River, another GBU-27 Paveway III was dropped through an air shaft in the center of the roof atop the building and blew out all four walls. During the first three weeks of the air offensive, F-117As obliterated many hardened targets with unprecedented precision. The 37th TFW flew 1271 combat sorties and maintained an 85.5 percent mission-capable rate. The 43 F-117As of the 37th Wing dropped more than 2,000 tons of precision ordnance and attacked some 40 percent of the high-value targets that were struck by the Coalition forces. Not one F-117A was hit, shot down, or lost to mechanical failure. There is no evidence that the F-117A was ever detected or tracked by Iraqi radar installations, either ground or airborne. The F-117's concealment, deception, and evasiveness proved that it could survive in the most hostile of environments, and its laser-guided bombs struck with extreme accuracy.

Most of the F-117As deployed to Saudi Arabia returned home to Tonopah in early April 1991, although a few remained as part of the post-Desert Storm task force in Southwest Asia. After Desert Storm, the 415th was assigned to the new 37th Operations Group, being redesignated the 415th Fighter Squadron as part of the wing's adoption of the Air Force Objective Wing organization.

In 1992, the F-117As were moved to Holloman Air Force Base, New Mexico. the 37th Fighter Wing and its subordinate organizations were inactivated and the aircraft, equipment, personnel, and mission of the squadron were transferred to the 7th Fighter Squadron of the 49th Operations Group at Holloman.

=== Return to special operations training ===
Air Education and Training Command had established Detachment 1 of the 58th Special Operations Wing at Kirtland Air Force Base, New Mexico to conduct advanced crew training for the MC-130J Commando II. This operation grew to a squadron sized element and on 22 September 2011, the 415th, now the 415th Special Operations Squadron, was activated to assume its mission, personnel and equipment.

== Lineage ==
- Constituted as the 415th Night Fighter Squadron on 8 February 1943

Activated on 10 February 1943
Inactivated on 1 September 1947

- Redesignated 415th Special Operations Training Squadron on 9 June 1970

Activated on 1 July 1970.
Inactivated on 30 June 1975

- Redesignated: 415th Tactical Fighter Squadron on 15 September 1989

Activated on 5 October 1989
Redesignated 415th Fighter Squadron on 1 November 1991
Inactivated on 1 July 1993

- Redesignated 415th Special Operations Squadron on 12 September 2011

Activated on 22 September 2011

=== Assignments ===
- Army Air Force School of Applied Tactics, 10 February 1943 (Air echelon attached to VIII Fighter Command, 31 March – 2 July 1943)
- Twelfth Air Force ( Attached to Northwest African Coastal Air Force, 12 May 1943
- 1st Air Defense Wing (later 62d Fighter Wing), 20 June 1943
- XII Fighter Command, 7 August 1943 (attached to Tunis Fighter Sector)
- 62d Fighter Wing, 27 September 1943 (attached to 64th Fighter Wing, c. 3 September – 5 December 1943)
- XII Air Support Command, 12 October 1943
- 64th Fighter Wing, 5 December 1943 (attached to 87th Fighter Wing, c. 3 July – c. 5 August 1944

Detachment attached to No. 600 Squadron RAF, 23 July – 5 August 1944

- Continental Air Command, 15 February 1946 (not manned or equipped)
- Strategic Air Command, 21 March 1946 (not manned or equipped)
- Tactical Air Command, 13 July 1946
- Third Air Force, 1 October 1946
- Ninth Air Force, 1 November 1946
- Alaskan Department, 27 June – 1 September 1947
- 1st Special Operations Wing (later 834th Tactical Composite Wing, 1st Special Operations Wing), 1 July 1970 – 30 June 1975
- 37th Tactical Fighter Wing, 5 October 1989
- 37th Operations Group, 1 November 1991
- 49th Operations Group, 8 July 1991 – 1 July 1993
- 58th Operations Group, 22 September 2011 – present

=== Stations ===
- Orlando Army Air Base, Florida, 10 February – 22 April 1943

Air echelon in England, 31 March – 18 June 1943

- La Senia Airfield, Oran, Algeria 12 May 1943
- La Sebala Airfield, Tunisia, 22 June 1943
- Monastir Airfield, Tunisia, 25 June 1943

Detachment operated from Protville Airfield, Tunisia, 23–29 July 1943

- La Sebala Airfield, Tunisia, 29 July 1943
- Cassibile Airfield, Sicily, Italy, 3 September 1943
- Catania Airfield, Sicily, Italy, 5 November 1943

Detachment operated from: Montecorvino Airfield, Italy, 29 November – 26 December 1943
Detachment operated from: Gaudo Airfield, Italy, 6 December 1943 – 30 January 1944

- Montecorvino Airfield, Italy, 26 December 1943
- Marcianise Airfield, Italy, 30 January 1944
- Pomigliano Airfield, Italy, 25 March 1944
- La Banca Airfield, Italy, c. 11 June 1944
- Voltone Airfield, Italy, c. 17 June 1944
- Solonzara Airfield, Corsica, France, c. 9 July 1944

Detachment operated from: Piombino Airfield, Italy, 23 July–c. 5 August 1944

- Le Vallon Airfield (Y-18), France, c. 1 September 1944
- Dijon-Longvic Airfield (Y-9), France, c. 25 September 1944
- Toul-Ochey Airfield (A-96), France, c. 30 November 1944
- Saint Dizier-Robinson Airfield (A-64), France, c. 18 March 1945
- Braunshardt Airfield (Y-72), Germany, c. 17 April 1945
- AAF Station Nordholz, Germany (R-56), c. 2 October 1945 – 15 February 1946
- Bolling Field, District of Columbia, 15 February 1946;
- Shaw Field, South Carolina, 13 July 1946 – 10 May 1947
- Adak Army Air Field, Alaska, 19 May–1 September 1947
- Eglin Auxiliary Field # 9, (Hurlburt Field), Florida, 9 June 1970 – 30 June 1975
- Tonopah Test Range Airport, Nevada, 5 October 1989 – 1 November 1991

Operated from King Khalid International Airport, Saudi Arabia, 19 August 1990 – 1 April 1991

- Holloman Air Force Base, 15 June 1992 – 1 July 1993
- Kirtland Air Force Base, New Mexico, 22 September 2011 – present

=== Aircraft ===
- Douglas A-20 Havoc, 1943
- Douglas P-70 Havoc, 1943
- Bristol Beaufighter, 1943–1945
- Northrop P-61 Black Widow, 1945–1946; 1946–1947
- North American B-25 Mitchell, 1946–1947
- Lockheed AC-130 Spectre, 1970–1975
- Lockheed F-117 Nighthawk, 1979–1993
- Lockheed HC-130J Hercules, 2011–present
- Lockheed MC-130J Hercules, 2011–present

== See also ==
- 481st Night Fighter Operational Training Group
