= List of wings of the United States Army Air Forces =

US Army Air Corps shoulder sleeve insigne

In 1948, the United States Air Force reorganized its wings under the Wing Base Reorganization. In this reorganization, a wing commanded a single combat group, along with the medical, maintenance, and support elements associated with the combat group. Prior to this reorganization, wings were operational headquarters, controlling several groups, while support units reported to a separate headquarters. Support units sometimes came from other Army branches, including quartermaster, ordnance, military police and signal units. (Note: these were usually referred to as ASWAAF units (for Arms and Services with the Army Air Forces).) The following lists numbered wings organized under the Air Service, Air Corps, and Army Air Forces prior to this reorganization. There were also a number of named wings during this period. In 1983 and 1984, several of the wings listed here were consolidated with post 1948 wings.

A handful of wings were organized in the American Expeditionary Forces during World War I. Only the 1st Pursuit Wing was active after that war.

While each wing has its own unique lineage, there are a few common dates that mark major organizational changes in the United States air arm that had major effects on wings.

Most wings prior to World War II were created in the Organized Reserve. Few were active after Air Corps units were reorganized on 1 October 1933. All that had not been disbanded by then were disbanded on 31 May 1942. In 1932 General Headquarters Air Force organized three wings that commanded all operational groups in the United States. (Note: With the exception of observation units, which remained attached to various ground headquarters.) Wings were also organized to control operational units in Hawaii and the Canal Zone.

In the fall of 1940, as the United States expanded its military before World War II, additional wings were organized. Almost all were inactivated in 1941 and their resources used to form numbered commands organized under the Numbered Air Forces in the United States and its possessions. Many of them were reactivated in 1942 as intermediate command elements between the numbered commands and combat groups.

In 1943, Army Air Forces Flying Training Command organized 22 flying training wings and Army Air Forces Technical Training Command activated 39 training wings at its basic training centers. Although the flying training wings were numbered in the single series along with other operational wings, the training wings were numbered separately, with the first digit in their designations duplicating the basic training center to which they were assigned. (Note: Because numbers in the 100s were reserved for National Guard units, the wings assigned to Basic Training Center No. 10 were assigned numbers beginning with 30.)

In April 1948, as the Air Force was reorganizing its wings under the wing/base system, reserve wings were redesignated as air divisions until they were inactivated in 1949, when the reserve converted to the Wing/Base Organizational System. Wings that had been activated in the Air National Guard were inactivated in October 1950, when the Guard adopted the wing/base system.

The list is arranged numerically. When more than one wing had the same number, they are arranged chronologically.

In addition to the training wings organized in 1943, balloon wings of the early 1920s and air defense wings of 1942-1943 were numbered in a separate series, but the air defense wings were later renumbered in the single series of wing numbers.

In addition to the reserve wings, several other AAF wings were later activated as air divisions.

== Unified list of numbered wings ==
Wing designation	Dates active	Subsequent status	Notes
1st Pursuit Wing	6 Jul 18–Dec 18	demobilized, reconstituted 14 Oct 36 and consolidated with 1st Wing	
1st Wing (later, 1st Bombardment Wing, 1st Pursuit Wing, 1st Wing, 1st Bombardment Wing, 1st Combat Bombardment Wing, 1st Bombardment Wing)	16 Aug 19–6 Jan 24; 1 Apr 31-7 Nov 45	disbanded in 1983	
2nd Wing (later, 2nd Bombardment Wing, 2nd Wing, 2nd Bombardment Wing, 2nd Combat Bombardment Wing, 2nd Bombardment Wing)	4 Sep 19–30 Sep 21; 8 May 29-7 Nov 45	disbanded in 1983	
3rd Attack Wing (later, 3rd Wing, 3rd Bombardment Wing)	15 Jun 32–5 Sep 41; 7 Jun 42-Nov 43; 20 Dec 46-16 Apr 48	redesignated 98th Combat Bombardment Wing in 1943, 3rd Air Division in 1948	
4th Airship Wing	Dec 24–1 Oct 33	disbanded	
4th Pursuit Wing	not active	constituted 8 May 29, disbanded 1 Jan 38	
4th Bombardment Wing	18 Dec 40-1 Oct 41; 7 Jun 42-18 Jun 45; 20 Dec 46-16 Apr 48	disbanded 1945, reconstituted 1946, redesignated 4th Air Division	
5th Airship Wing	Jan 25–1 Oct 33	disbanded	
5th Bombardment Wing	18 Dec 40-5 Sep 41; 10 Jul 42-2 Nov 45	redesignated 5th Air Division	
5th Pursuit Wing (later, 5th Attack Wing)	17 Jun 35-31 Oct 36	disbanded in 1938	
6th Wing (later, 6th Attack Wing)	1 Mar 22-3 Dec 26	disbanded in 1942	
6th Pursuit Wing^{1} (Note: This list uses superscripts when more than one wing had had the same designation to distinguish them. These are not part of the wings' official designation.) (later, 6th Transport Wing)	17 Jun 35-31 Oct 36	disbanded in 1942	
6th Pursuit Wing^{2} (later, 6th Fighter Wing)	18 Dec 40-7 Dec 41; 7 Jun 42-13 Sep 43; 5 Aug 46-28 Jul 48	disbanded 1943, reconstituted 1946, redesignated 6th Air Division	
7th Wing (later, 7th Attack Wing)	Jun 22-by Mar 30	disbanded in 1942	
7th Pursuit Wing (later, 7th Fighter Wing)	18 Dec 40-31 Aug 41; 7 Jun 42-25 Feb 43	redesignated 47th Bombardment Wing	
8th Wing (later, 8th Attack Wing)	Feb 22-18 Oct 29	disbanded in 1933	
8th Pursuit Wing (later, 8th Fighter Wing)	6 Nov 40-1 Nov 41; 24 Jul 42-6 Apr 43	redesignated 57th Bombardment Wing	
9th Wing (later, 9th Attack Wing)	4 May 22-1 Dec 29	disbanded in 1933	
9th Pursuit Wing (later, 9th Fighter Wing)	18 Dec 40–1 Oct 41; 24 Jul 42–31 Mar 43	disbanded in 1983, reconstituted 1985 as 348th Tactical Electronic Group	
10th Wing (later, 10th Attack Wing)	not active	constituted 15 Oct 21, disbanded 1 Oct 33	
10th Pursuit Wing (later, 10th Fighter Wing)	18 Dec 40–31 Mar 43	disbanded in 1983, reconstituted 1985 as 547th Tactical Airlift Group	
11th Wing (later, 11th Attack Wing)	17 Oct 22-1 Sep 28	disbanded in 1933	
11th Pursuit Wing (later, 11th Fighter Wing)	18 Dec 40–1 Oct 41; 1 Nov 42-1 May 43	redesignated 1985 as 367th Electronic Warfare Group	
12th Pursuit Wing (later, 12th Bombardment Wing)	20 Nov 40–6 Mar 42; 8 Sep 42-9 Oct 44; 3 Aug 47-16 Apr 48	disbanded 1944, reconstituted 1947, redesignated as 12th Air Division	
13th Wing (later, 13th Bombardment Wing^{1})	Feb 25-23 Jul 29	disbanded 1942	
13th Composite Wing (later, 13th Bombardment Wing^{2}, 13th Combat Bombardment Wing, 13th Bombardment Wing^{2})	10 Oct 40–24 Oct 41; 1 Oct 42-17 Oct 45	redesignated 13th Strategic Missile Division	
14th Bombardment Wing^{1}	not organized	constituted 31 Mar 24, disbanded 31 May 42	(Note: Clay is unclear as to whether the wing was initially organized as the 14th Wing (Bombardment) or 14th Bombardment Wing.)
14th Pursuit Wing (later, 14th Bombardment Wing^{2}, 14th Combat Bombardment Wing, 14th Bombardment Wing^{2})	1 Nov 40–23 Jan 42; 1 Oct 42-7 Nov 45	redesignated 14th Air Division	
15th Bombardment Wing^{1} (later, 15th Transport Wing)	by Apr 30–2 Mar 37	disbanded in 1942	(Note: Clay is unclear as to whether the wing was initially organized as the 15th Wing (Bombardment) or 15th Bombardment Wing.)
15th Bombardment Wing^{2} (later, 15th Bombardment Training Wing, 15th Bombardment Operational Training Wing)	18 Dec 40–3 Sep 41; 23 Jun 42-9 Apr 46	disbanded in 1948, reconstituted in 1985 as 535th Combat Crew Training Wing	
16th Wing (later, 16th Bombardment Wing^{1})	c. Jan 27–by Jun 29	disbanded in 1942	
16th Bombardment Wing^{2} (later, 16th Bombardment Training Wing, 16th Bombardment Operational Training Wing)	18 Dec 40–1 Sep 41; 23 Jun 42-9 Apr 46	disbanded in 1948, reconstituted in 1985 as 540th Combat Crew Training Wing	
17th Wing (later, 17th Pursuit Wing)	Dec 24–by Jun 29	disbanded in 1942	
17th Bombardment Wing (later, 17th Bombardment Training Wing, 17th Bombardment Operational Training Wing)	18 Dec 40–1 Sep 41; 11 Mar 44-9 Apr 46	disbanded in 1948, reconstituted in 1959 as 17th Air Division	
18th Pursuit Wing	not active	constituted 31 Mar 24, disbanded 31 May 1942	(Note: Clay is unclear as to whether the wing was initially organized as the 18th Wing (Pursuit) or 18th Pursuit Wing.)
18th Composite Wing (later, 18th Wing, 18th Bombardment Wing, 18th Replacement Wing)	1 May 31–29 Jan 42; 23 Jun 42-11 Apr 44	disbanded	
19th Composite Wing (later, 19th Wing, 19th Bombardment Wing)	1 Apr 31–25 Oct 41; 24 Jul 42-17 Nov 42; 20 Dec 46-16 Apr 48	redesignated IX Bomber Command in 1942, redesignated 19th Air Division in 1948	
20th Bombardment Wing (later, 20th Combat Bombardment Wing, 20th Bombardment Wing)	18 Dec 40–1 Sep 41; 1 Nov 42-9 Apr 46	redesignated VIII Bomber Command, reconstituted in 1959 as 20th Air Division	
20th Fighter Wing	c. 31 May 46–Dec 47	was VII Bomber Command, redesignated 46th Fighter Wing (Note: The wing was renumbered after another 20th Fighter Wing was formed under the Wing/Base Organization. Ravenstein, pp. 38-40.)	
21st Air Wing (later, 21st Wing)	not active	constituted 23 Mar 24, disbanded 31 May 42	
21st Bombardment Wing^{1}	1 Nov 40–1 Nov 41	disbanded 1942	
21st Bombardment Wing^{2}	22 Dec 42–27 Sep 45; 20 Dec 46-16 Apr 48	redesignated I Staging Command in 1945, redesignated 21st Air Division in 1948	
22nd Air Wing (later, 22nd Wing)	not active	constituted 23 Mar 24, disbanded 31 May 42	
22nd Pursuit Wing	18 Dec 40–1 Oct 41	disbanded 1942	
22d Bombardment Training Wing	5 Dec 42–15 Aug 43	disbanded, reconstituted 1959 as 22nd Air Division	
23rd Air Wing (later, 23rd Wing)	not active	constituted 23 Mar 24, disbanded 31 May 42	
23rd AAF Ferrying Wing	17 Jun 42–5 Jul 42	redesignated North Atlantic Wing, ATC	
23d Bombardment Training Wing	c. 10 Apr 43–c. 6 Aug 43	disbanded	
24th Air Wing (later, 24th Wing, 24th School Wing)	1 Aug 27-1 Oct 31	disbanded	
24th AAF Ferrying Wing	26 Jun 42–5 Jul 42	redesignated South Atlantic Wing, ATC	
24th Composite Wing(later, 24th Air Commando Wing, 24th Special Operations Wing, 24th Special Operations Group, 24th Composite Group, 24th Composite Wing, 24th Wing, 24th Special Operations Wing)	25 Dec 42–15 Jun 44; 5 Aug 46-28 Jul 48; 8 Nov 67-31 Jan 87; 1 Jan 89-15 Feb 91; 11 Feb 92-1 Nov 99; 12 Jun 12-present	disbanded in 1944 and reestablished in 1946	
25th Air Wing (later, 25th Wing)	not active	constituted 23 Mar 24, disbanded 31 May 42	
25th AAF Ferrying Wing	26 Jun 42–5 Jul 42	redesignated South Pacific Wing, ATC	
25th Antisubmarine Wing	20 Nov 42–15 Oct 43	disbanded, reconstituted 1985 as 525th Combat Crew Training Group	
26th Air Wing (later, 26th Wing)	not active	constituted 23 Mar 24, disbanded 31 May 42	
26th AAF Ferrying Wing	27 Jun 42–5 Jul 42	redesignated African-Middle East Wing, ATC	
26th Antisubmarine Wing	20 Nov 42–25 Oct 43	disbanded, reconstituted 1985 as 526th Special Operations Wing	
27th Air Wing (later, 27th Wing)	not active	constituted 23 Mar 24, disbanded 31 May 42	
27th AAF Ferrying Wing	19 Jun 42–5 Jul 42	redesignated Caribbean Wing, ATC	
27th Flying Training Wing	26 Dec 42–16 Jun 46	disbanded	
28th Air Wing (later, 28th Wing)	not active	constituted 23 Mar 24, disbanded 31 May 42	
28th Flying Training Wing	26 Dec 42–c. 1 Sep 45	disbanded	
29th Air Wing (later, 29th Wing)	not active	constituted 23 Mar 24, disbanded 31 May 42	
29th Flying Training Wing	26 Dec 42–16 Jun 46	disbanded	
30th Air Wing (later, 30th Wing)	not active	constituted 23 Mar 24, disbanded 31 May 42	
30th Flying Training Wing	26 Dec 42–13 Oct 46	disbanded	
31st Air Wing (later, 31st Wing)	not active	constituted 23 Mar 24, disbanded 31 May 42	
31st Flying Training Wing	16 Jan 43–c. 30 Dec 45	disbanded	
32nd Air Wing (later, 32nd Wing)	not active	constituted 23 Mar 24, disbanded 31 May 42	
32nd Flying Training Wing	16 Jan 43–13 Oct 46	disbanded	
33rd Airship Wing	not active	constituted 23 Mar 24, disbanded 31 May 42	
33rd Flying Training Wing	16 Jan 43–13 Oct 46	disbanded	
34th Airship Wing	not active	constituted 23 Mar 24, disbanded 31 May 42	
34th Flying Training Wing	16 Jan 43–13 Oct 46	disbanded	
35th Flying Training Wing	8 Jan 43–c. 20 Aug 45	disbanded	
36th Flying Training Wing	8 Jan 43–c. Feb 45	disbanded	
37th Flying Training Wing	8 Jan 43–16 Jun 46	disbanded, reconstituted in 1985 as 537th Flying Training Wing	
38th Flying Training Wing	8 Jan 43–16 Jun 46	disbanded, reconstituted in 1985 as 538th Flying Training Wing	
39th Air Freight Wing	1 Jan 43–31 Mar 44	disbanded	
40th Bombardment Wing (later, 40th Combat Bombardment Wing, 40th Bombardment Wing)	21 Jan 43–25 Dec 46	redesignated 40th Air Division in 1951	
41st Bombardment Wing (later, 41st Combat Bombardment Wing)	16 Feb 43–18 Jun 45	disbanded	
42nd Bombardment Wing	16 Feb 43–25 Oct 45	redesignated 42nd Air Division in 1951	
43rd Weather Wing	20 Sep 45–3 Jun 48	inactivated	
44th Bombardment Wing	1 Mar 43–2 Nov 43; 26 Jun 47-16 Apr 48	redesignated 99th Combat Bombardment Wing in 1943, redesignated 44th Air Division in 1948	
45th Bombardment Wing (later, 45th Combat Bombardment Wing)	1 Apr 43–18 Jun 45	disbanded reconstituted as 45th Air Division in 1954	
46th Bombardment Training Wing (later, 46th Bombardment Operational Training Wing)	21 Feb 43–9 Apr 46	disbanded in 1948, reconstituted as 46th Operations Group in 1993	
46th Fighter Wing	Dec 47-24 Aug 48	was 20th Fighter Wing, disbanded in 1983	
47th Bombardment Wing	25 Feb 43-15 Oct 45	was 7th Fighter Wing, redesignated 47th Air Division in 1951	
48th Bombardment Operational Training Wing (later, 48th Staging Wing)	31 Mar 43–c. 31 Mar 46	disbanded	
49th Bombardment Operational Training Wing (later, 49th Bombardment Wing)	31 Mar 43-16 Oct 45	redesignated 49th Air Division in 1951	
50th Transport Wing (later, 50th Troop Carrier Wing)	8 Jan 41-31 Jul 46	redesignated 50th Air Division in 1959	
51st Transport Wing (later, 51st Troop Carrier Wing)	1 Jun 42-5 Jan 48	disbanded in 1983, reconstituted in 1985 and consolidated with 551st Airborne Early Warning & Control Wing	
52d Transport Wing (later, 52nd Troop Carrier Wing, 52nd Fighter Wing)	15 Jun 42-27 Aug 46; 3 Oct 47-31 Oct 50	disbanded in 1983	
53rd Troop Carrier Wing (later, 53rd Fighter Wing)	1 Aug 42-11 Oct 45; 17 Jan 47-31 Oct 50	disbanded in 1983	
54th Troop Carrier Wing (later, 54th Fighter Wing, 54th Tactical Fighter Wing)	13 Mar 43-31 May 46; 2 Oct 46-11 Oct 50; 15 Jun 70-31 Oct 70		
55th Bombardment Operational Training Wing (later, 55th Bombardment Wing, 55th Fighter Wing)	10 Apr 43–9 Sep 45; 7 Dec 47-31 Oct 50	disbanded in 1983	
56th Bombardment Training Wing (later, 56th Combat Crew Training Wing)	10 Apr 43–c. 31 Oct 45	disbanded	
57th Bombardment Wing	6 Apr 43-12 Sep 45	was 8th Fighter Wing, redesignated 57th Air Division	
58th Bombardment Operational Training Wing (later, 58th Bombardment Wing, 58th Fighter Wing)	1 May 43–12 Oct 44; 8 Feb 45-Apr 48	redesignated 58th Air Division	
59th Weather Wing	23 Nov 45–3 Oct 47	inactivated	
60th Troop Carrier Wing (later, 60th Fighter Wing)	12 Jun 43-8 Oct 45; 19 Apr 48-31 Oct 50	disbanded in 1983	
61st Troop Carrier Wing (later, 61st Fighter Wing)	13 Jun 43-4 Oct 45; 4 Apr 48-31 Oct 50	disbanded in 1983	
62nd Fighter Wing	c. 24 Jul 43–12 Sep 45; 14 Sep 46-31 Oct 50	was 1st Air Defense Wing, disbanded in 1983	
63rd Fighter Wing	c. 24 Jul 43–11 Dec 45; 23 May 48-11 Oct 50	was 2nd Air Defense Wing, disbanded in 1983	
64th Fighter Wing	24 Jul 43–5 Jun 47	was 3rd Air Defense Wing, redesignated 64th Air Division in 1952	
65th Fighter Wing	24 Jul 43–21 Nov 45	was 4th Air Defense Wing, redesignated 65th Air Division in 1952	
66th Fighter Wing	c. 24 Jul 43–21 Nov 45; 26 Nov 45-31 Oct 50	was 5th Air Defense Wing, disbanded in 1983	
67th Fighter Wing	c. 24 Jul 43–21 Nov 45; 15 Oct 46-15 Oct 46	was 6th Air Defense Wing, disbanded in 1983	
68th Fighter Wing (later, 68th Composite Wing)	3 Sep 43–10 Oct 45	disbanded in 1983, reconstituted in 1985 and redesignated 518th Air Refueling Wing	
69th Bombardment Wing (later, 69th Composite Wing, 69th Troop Carrier Wing)	3 Sep 43–26 Dec 45; 23 Mar 47-16 Apr 48	redesignated 69th Air Division	
70th Fighter Wing	15 Aug 43–25 Sep 47	disbanded in 1983	
71st Fighter Wing	15 Aug 43–3 Dec 45	disbanded in 1983	
72d Bombardment Operational Training Wing (later, 72nd Fighter Wing)	20 Aug 43–9 Apr 46	disbanded in 1983	
73d Bombardment Operational Training Wing (later, 73rd Bombardment Wing)	17 Aug 43–15 Oct 43; 20 Nov 43-31 May 46; 12 Jun 47-16 Apr 48	was 5th Heavy Bombardment Processing Headquarters, redesignated 73rd Air Division	
74th Flying Training Wing	25 Aug 43–c. 15 Dec 45	disbanded	
75th Flying Training Wing	25 Aug 43–16 Jun 46	disbanded	
76th Flying Training Wing	25 Aug 43–16 Jun 46	disbanded	
77th Flying Training Wing	25 Aug 43–16 Jun 46	disbanded	
78th Flying Training Wing	25 Aug 43–30 Jun 45	disbanded	
79th Flying Training Wing	25 Aug 43–c. 30 Dec 45	disbanded	
80th Flying Training Wing	25 Aug 43–16 Jun 46	disbanded	
81st Flying Training Wing	25 Aug 43–c. 1 Dec 44	disbanded	
82nd Flying Training Wing	25 Aug 43–16 Jun 46	disbanded	
83rd Flying Training Wing	25 Aug 43–c. 31 Dec 44	disbanded	
84th Fighter Wing	10 Nov 43–12 Aug 45	disbanded	
85th Fighter Wing	10 Nov 43–30 Jun 48	redesignated 85th Air Division in 1955	
86th Fighter Wing	1 Dec 43–15 Mar 46; 3 Jul 46-31 Oct 50	disbanded in 1983	
87th Fighter Wing	25 Oct 43–1 Apr 45	disbanded	
88th Reconnaissance Training Wing	c. 18 Aug 43–20 Dec 43	disbanded	
89th Reconnaissance Training Wing (later, 89th Combat Crew Training Wing)	c. 18 Aug 43–c. 8 Apr 46	disbanded in 1948	
90th Photographic Wing (later, 90th Reconnaissance Wing)	22 Nov 43–23 Oct 45; 20 Dec 46-16 Apr 48	redesignated 90th Air Division	
91st Photographic Wing (later, 91st Reconnaissance Wing)	22 Nov 43–27 Jan 46; 20 Dec 46-16 Apr 48	redesignated 91st Air Division	
92d Combat Bombardment Wing (later, 92nd Bombardment Wing)	22 Nov 43–28 Aug 45	disbanded, reconstituted in 1985 as the 542nd Combat Crew Training Wing	
93rd Combat Bombardment Wing	1 Nov 43–28 Aug 45	disbanded	
94th Combat Bombardment Wing	12 Dec 43–18 Jun 45	disbanded	
95th Combat Bombardment Wing	12 Dec 43–28 Aug 45	disbanded	
96th Combat Bombardment Wing (later, 96th Bombardment Wing)	11 Jan 44–17 Oct 45; 12 Jun 47-16 Apr 48	redesignated 96th Air Division	
97th Combat Bombardment Wing (later, 97th Bombardment Wing)	12 Nov 43–11 Oct 45	disbanded in 1983	
98th Combat Bombardment Wing (later, 98th Bombardment Wing)	Nov 43-27 Nov 45	was 3rd Bombardment Wing, inactivated, reactivated as 3rd Bombardment Wing	
99th Combat Bombardment Wing (later, 99th Bombardment Wing)	2 Nov 43–4 Oct 45	was 44th Bombardment Wing, redesignated 44th Bombardment Wing	
100th Fighter Wing	24 Nov 43–1 Apr 45	disbanded	
301st Fighter Wing (later, 301st Tactical Fighter Wing, 301st Fighter Wing)	15 Oct 44–20 Jan 49; 1 Jul 72-present		
302d Transport Wing (later 302nd Troop Carrier Wing)	5 Dec 43–15 Dec 45; 20 Dec 46-16 Apr 48	redesignated 302nd Air Division	
303rd Fighter Wing	24 Nov 43–12 Aug 45	disbanded, reconstituted in 1985 and consolidated with the 703rd Strategic Missile Wing as the 503rd Tactical Missile Wing	
304th Bombardment Wing	29 Dec 43–13 Oct 45; 19 Apr 47-16 Apr 48	redesignated 304th Air Division	
305th Bombardment Wing	29 Dec 43–9 Sep 45; 12 Jul 47-16 Apr 48	redesignated 305th Air Division	
306th Bombardment Wing (later, 306th Fighter Wing)	15 Jan 44–7 nov 45	disbanded in 1983, reconstituted in 1985 and consolidated with the 656th Special Operations Wing as the 356th Special Operations Wing	
307th Bombardment Wing	15 Jan 44–15 Jun 44; 31 Mar 47-16 Apr 48	disbanded in 1945, reconstituted in 1947, redesignated 307th Air Division	
308th Bombardment Wing	1 Feb 44–30 Jun 48	disbanded in 1983	
309th Bombardment Wing	1 Feb 44–25 Mar 46; 10 Jan 47-16 Apr 48	redesignated 309th Air Division	
310th Bombardment Wing	1 Feb 44–25 Mar 46; 26 Jun 47-16 Apr 48	redesignated 310th Air Division	
311th Photographic Wing (later, 310th Reconnaissance Wing)	1 Feb 44–Apr 48	redesignated 311th Air Division	
312th Fighter Wing	13 Mar 44–5 Nov 45	disbanded in 1983	
313th Bombardment Wing	23 Apr 44–15 Jun 48	redesignated 313th Air Division in 1955	
314th Bombardment Wing (later, 314th Composite Wing)	23 Apr 44–20 Aug 48	redesignated 314th Air Division in 1950	
315th Bombardment Wing (later, 315th Composite Wing)	17 Jul 44–20 Aug 48	redesignated 315th Air Division in 1951	
316th Bombardment Wing (later, 316th Composite Wing)	14 Aug 44–21 Jun 48	redesignated 316th Air Division in 1953	
317th Wing	1 May 44-1 Apr 46	disbanded in 1948	
318th Wing	1 May 44-1 Apr 46	disbanded in 1948	
319th Wing	c. 1 May 44-1 Apr 46	disbanded in 1948	
320th Wing	1 May 44-1 Apr 46	disbanded in 1948	
321st Wing	1 May 44-c. 30 Sep 45	disbanded	
322d Troop Carrier Wing	30 Dec 44–15 Feb 46; 12 Jun 47-16 Apr 48	redesignated 322nd Air Division	
323d Combat Crew Training Wing (later, 323rd Troop Carrier Wing)	13 Feb 45–8 Apr 46; 1 Aug 47-16 Apr 48	was Boston Fighter Wing, redesignated 323rd Air Division	
325th Photographic Wing (later, 325th Reconnaissance Wing)	9 Aug 44–20 Oct 45; 9 Apr 47-16 Apr 48	redesignated 325th Air Division	

== Separately numbered wings ==
=== Balloon Wings ===
Wing designation	Dates active	Subsequent status	Notes
Balloon Wing, First Army	c. Aug 18–c. Apr 19	was 1st Army Balloon Group demobilized	
I Corps Balloon Wing	c. Jul 18–c. 8 Oct 18	demobilized	
1st Balloon Wing	by Dec 22–25 Jan 23	redesignated 10th Balloon Wing	
Balloon Wing, Second Army	c. 1918	demobilized	
2nd Balloon Wing	17 Oct 22–25 Jan 23	redesignated 12th Balloon Wing	
III Corps Balloon Wing	c. 24 Sep 18–c. 8 Oct 18	redesignated Balloon Group, III Corps	
10th Balloon Wing	25 Jan 23-1 Oct 33	was 1st Balloon Wing, disbanded	
12th Balloon Wing	25 Jan 23-1 Sep 28; 28 Jan 30-1 Oct 33	was 2nd Balloon Wing, disbanded	

=== Air Defense Wings ===
Wing designation	Dates active	Subsequent status	Notes
1st Air Defense Wing	12 Dec 42–c. 24 Jul 43	redesignated 62nd Fighter Wing	
2d Air Defense Wing	12 Dec 42–c. 24 Jul 43	redesignated 63rd Fighter Wing	
3rd Air Defense Wing	12 Dec 42–24 Jul 43	redesignated 64th Fighter Wing	
4th Air Defense Wing	27 Mar 43–24 Jul 43	redesignated 65th Fighter Wing	
5th Air Defense Wing	27 Mar 43–c. 24 Jul 43	redesignated 66th Fighter Wing	
6th Air Defense Wing	15 Jun 43–c. 24 Jul 43	redesignated 67th Fighter Wing	

=== Training Wings ===
Wing designation	Dates active	Subsequent status	Notes
11th Training Wing, AAF Technical Training Command	28 Feb 43-30 Apr 44	disbanded	
12th Training Wing, AAF Technical Training Command	28 Feb 43-30 Apr 44	disbanded	
13th Training Wing, AAF Technical Training Command	28 Feb 43-30 Apr 44	disbanded	
14th Training Wing, AAF Technical Training Command	28 Feb 43-30 Apr 44	disbanded	
21st Training Wing, AAF Technical Training Command	28 Feb 43-30 Apr 44	disbanded	
22nd Training Wing, AAF Technical Training Command	28 Feb 43-30 Apr 44	disbanded	
23rd Training Wing, AAF Technical Training Command	28 Feb 43-30 Apr 44	disbanded	
31st Training Wing, AAF Technical Training Command	c. 28 Feb 43-30 Apr 44	disbanded	
32nd Training Wing, AAF Technical Training Command	c. 28 Feb 43-30 Apr 44	disbanded	
41st Training Wing, AAF Technical Training Command	28 Feb 43-c. 30 Apr 44	disbanded	
42nd Training Wing, AAF Technical Training Command	28 Feb 43-c. 31 Dec 43	disbanded	
43rd Training Wing, AAF Technical Training Command	28 Feb 43-c. 30 Apr 44	disbanded	
44th Training Wing, AAF Technical Training Command	28 Feb 43-c. 30 Apr 44	disbanded	
45th Training Wing, AAF Technical Training Command	28 Feb 43-c. 8 Jul 43	disbanded	
46th Training Wing, AAF Technical Training Command	28 Feb 43-c. 31 Dec 43	disbanded	
51st Training Wing, AAF Technical Training Command	28 Feb 43-c. 30 Apr 44	disbanded	
52nd Training Wing, AAF Technical Training Command	28 Feb 43-c. 30 Apr 44	disbanded	
53rd Training Wing, AAF Technical Training Command	28 Feb 43-c. 30 Sep 43	disbanded	
61st Training Wing, AAF Technical Training Command	1 Mar 43-c. 30 Apr 44	disbanded	
62nd Training Wing, AAF Technical Training Command	1 Mar 43-c. 29 Feb 44	disbanded	
63rd Training Wing, AAF Technical Training Command	1 Mar 43-c. 30 Apr 44	disbanded	
64th Training Wing, AAF Technical Training Command	1 Mar 43-c. 30 Apr 44	disbanded	
71st Training Wing, AAF Technical Training Command	28 Feb 43-c. 5 Jan 44	disbanded	
72nd Training Wing, AAF Technical Training Command	28 Feb 43-c. 5 Jan 44	disbanded	
73rd Training Wing, AAF Technical Training Command	28 Feb 43-c. 5 Jan 44	disbanded	
74th Training Wing, AAF Technical Training Command	28 Feb 43-c. 5 Jan 44	disbanded	
75th Training Wing, AAF Technical Training Command	28 Feb 43-c. 30 Apr 44	disbanded	
76th Training Wing, AAF Technical Training Command	28 Feb 43-30 Apr 44	disbanded	
81st Training Wing, AAF Technical Training Command	1 Mar 43-c. 30 Sep 43	disbanded	
82nd Training Wing, AAF Technical Training Command	1 Mar 43-c. 23 Feb 44	disbanded	
91st Training Wing, AAF Technical Training Command	1 Mar 43-c. 30 Apr 44	disbanded	
92nd Training Wing, AAF Technical Training Command	1 Mar 43-c. 20 Aug 43	disbanded	
93rd Training Wing, AAF Technical Training Command	1 Mar 43-c. 20 Aug 43	disbanded	
94th Training Wing, AAF Technical Training Command	1 Mar 43-c. 30 Apr 44	disbanded	
95th Training Wing, AAF Technical Training Command	1 Mar 43-c. 30 Apr 44	disbanded	
301st Training Wing, AAF Technical Training Command	28 Feb 43-c. 30 Apr 44	disbanded	
302nd Training Wing, AAF Technical Training Command	1 Mar 43-c. 30 Apr 44	disbanded	
303rd Training Wing, AAF Technical Training Command	1 Mar 43-c. 30 Apr 44	disbanded	
304th Training Wing, AAF Technical Training Command	1 Mar 43-c. 30 Apr 44	disbanded	

== See also ==
- List of MAJCOM wings of the United States Air Force
- List of Air Force-controlled wings of the United States Air Force

=== References ===
==== Notes ====
Explanatory notes

Citations

==== Bibliography ====
- Clay, Steven E. (2011). US Army Order of Battle 1919-1941 (PDF). Vol. 3 The Services: Air Service, Engineers, and Special Troops 1919-1941. Fort Leavenworth, KS: Combat Studies Institute Press. ISBN 978-0-98419-014-0. LCCN 2010022326. OCLC 637712205.
- Gorrell, Col. Edgar S. (1974). History of the American Expeditionary Forces Air Service, 1917-1919. Washington, DC: National Archives and Records Service, General Services Administration. OCLC 215070705.
- Manning, Thomas A.; Aschcroft, Bruce A.; Emmons, Richard H.; Hussey, Ann K.; Mason, Joseph L. (2005). History of Air Education and Training Command, 1942–2002 (PDF). Randolph AFB, Texas: Office of History and Research, Headquarters, Air Education and Training Command. ASIN B000NYX3PC. ISBN 978-1376984057.
- Markus, Rita M.; Halbersen, MSG Nicholas F.; Fuller, John F. (1987). Matthews, James K.; Gustin, Joylyn I. (eds.). Air Weather Service: Our Heritage 1937-1987 (PDF). Scott AFB, IL: Air Weather Service. OCLC 18406969.
- Maurer, Maurer, ed. (1983) [1961]. Air Force Combat Units of World War II (PDF) (reprint ed.). Washington, DC: Office of Air Force History. ISBN 0-912799-02-1. LCCN 61060979. Archived from the original (PDF) on 15 January 2021.
- Mueller, Robert (1989). Air Force Bases, Vol. I, Active Air Force Bases Within the United States of America on 17 September 1982 (PDF). Washington, DC: Office of Air Force History. ISBN 0-912799-53-6.
- Ravenstein, Charles A. (1984). Air Force Combat Wings, Lineage & Honors Histories 1947-1977 (PDF). Washington, DC: Office of Air Force History. ISBN 0-912799-12-9.
- Historical Branch, Air Transport Command (1960). "Administrative History of the Ferrying Command, 29 May 1941–30 June 1942, USAF Historical Study No. 33" (PDF). Assistant Chief of Air Staff Intelligence, Historical Division.
