= 416th Fighter Squadron =

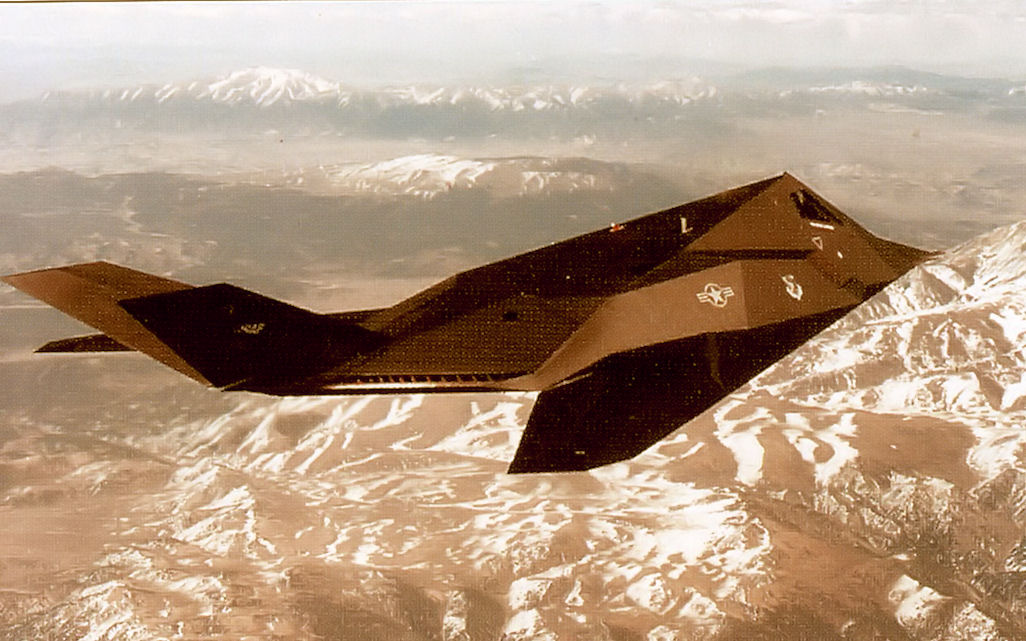
- F-117A Nighthawk flying over the Sierra Mountains (Note: Aircraft is Lockheed F-117A Nighthawk, serial 81-10798.)
- Active: 1943–1946; 1953–1958; 1958–1972; 1979–1983; 1989–1993
- Country: United States
- Branch: United States Air Force
- Role: Fighter
- Nicknames: Silver Knights (1958-1983); Ghostriders (1989-1993)
- Engagements: World War II (EAME Theater) Vietnam War 1991 Gulf War (Defense of Saudi Arabia; Liberation of Kuwait)
- Decorations: Distinguished Unit Citation; Presidential Unit Citation; Air Force Outstanding Unit Award with Combat "V" Device; Air Force Outstanding Unit Award; Republic of Vietnam Gallantry Cross with Palm

Insignia
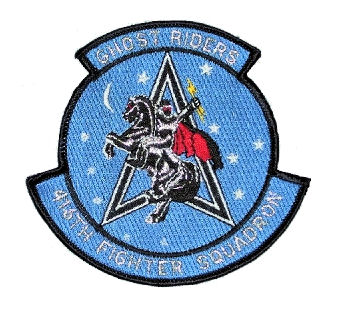
- 416th Fighter Squadron emblem (Note: Breslin, p. 21.)

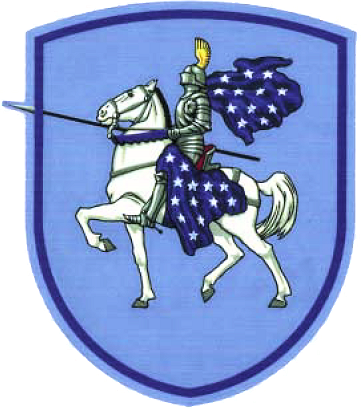
- 416th Tactical Fighter Squadron emblem (Note: Approved 14 December 1958. Maurer, Combat Squadrons, pp. 509–510.)

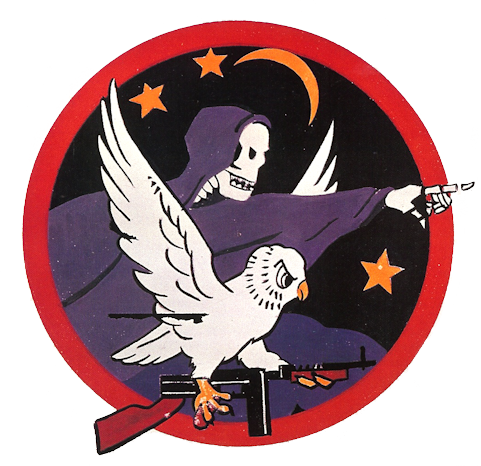
- 416th Night Fighter Squadron emblem (Note: Watkins, p. 51.)

The 416th Fighter Squadron is an inactive United States Air Force unit. Its last assignment was with the 49th Fighter Wing at Holloman Air Force Base, New Mexico. The squadron was inactivated on 1 July 1993.

The squadron was first activated during World War II as the 416th Night Fighter Squadron. After training in the United States, the squadron deployed to England, where it was equipped with British aircraft and conducted advanced night fighter training with the Royal Air Force, which included its introduction to combat. Three months later, it deployed to the Mediterranean Theater of Operations. It flew combat missions until V-E Day, earning a Distinguished Unit Citation. It served as part of the occupation forces until 1946, when it inactivated and transferred its personnel and equipment to another unit. The squadron was again activated as the 416th Fighter-Bomber Squadron, when it replaced an Air National Guard squadron that had been mobilized for the Korean War. After converting to jet fighters, the squadron deployed to France, serving as part of NATO until inactivating in 1958.

The squadron was shortly reactivated in Japan, serving until June 1964, when, as the 416th Tactical Fighter Squadron, it returned to the United States. It deployed to Southeast Asia twice before moving permanently to South Vietnam in 1965. It flew combat missions there until 1970, with one flight serving as Fast FACs. Before returning to the United States in 1970, it earned additional combat awards. After serving as a training unit, it was inactivated in July 1971. As the 416th Tactical Fighter Training Squadron, it again trained fighter pilots from 1979 to 1983.

The squadron's most recent activation began in October 1989, when it replaced a classified unit flying stealth fighters. It continued flying the Lockheed F-117 Nighthawk, including during Desert Storm until 1993, when it transferred its mission to another unit.

== History ==
=== World War II ===
The squadron was first established in February 1943 as the 416th Night Fighter Squadron and assigned to the 481st Night Fighter Operational Training Group at Orlando Army Air Base, Florida for training. The 416th was among the first Army Air Forces dedicated night fighter squadron formed. Trained in the Douglas P-70 Havoc, a modified A-20 bomber using a U.S. version of the British Mk IV radar. At the time the P-70 was the only American night fighter available.

After completing its initial training by April 1943, the squadron crossed the Atlantic on the RMS Queen Elizabeth and landed in the United Kingdom on 11 May. Pausing briefly for training under VIII Fighter Command the Squadron was attached to the Royal Air Force (RAF) for familiarization in theater night fighter techniques. There, it was equipped with RAF Bristol Beaufighters through a Reverse Lend-Lease program until an American aircraft could be produced. Upon arrival in England the squadron received additional training with Royal Air Force night fighter units at several bases in early 1943 achieving the first victory on 24 July. Through the summer, they conducted daytime convoy escort and strike missions, but thereafter flew primarily at night.

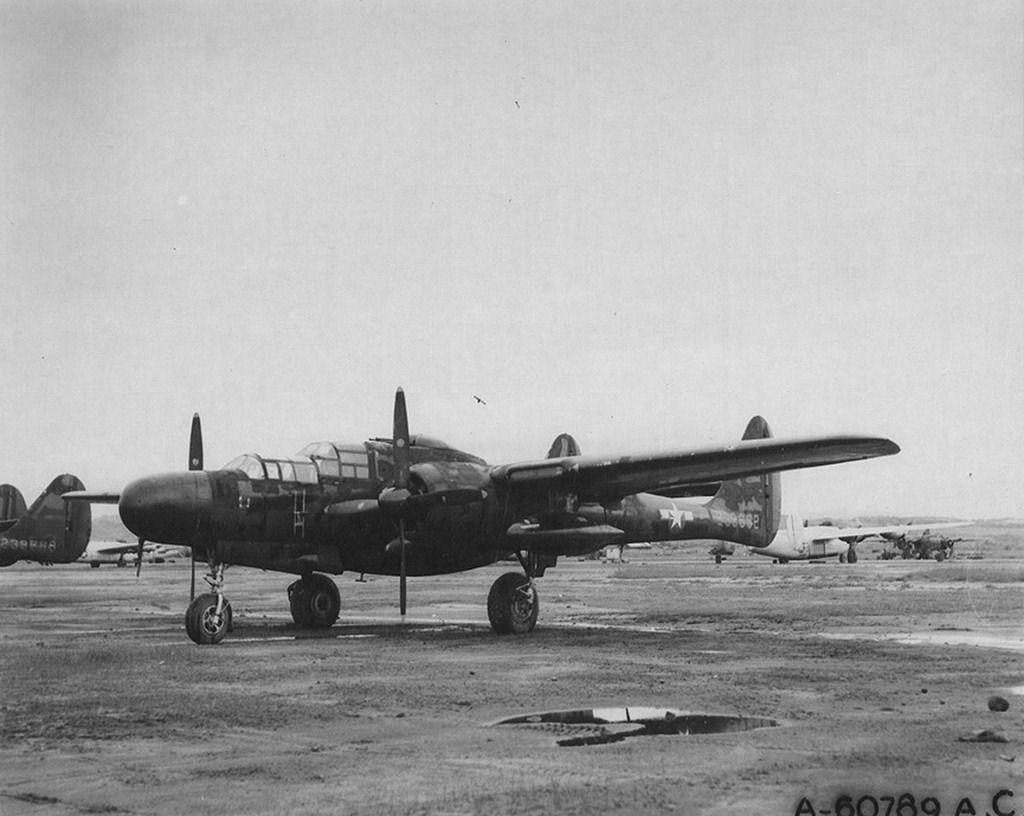
416th Night Fighter Squadron P-61 Black Widow (Note: Aircraft is Northrop P-61B-15-NO Black Widow, serial 42-39682.)

The unit then moved to North Africa for operations with Twelfth Air Force. There, the squadron fell under the operational control of the Northwest African Coastal Air Force, a Combined allied organization with British, Free French, and other American units. It carried out defensive night patrols over Allied held territory during the North African campaign, and also conducted night interdiction raids on German positions in Algeria and Tunisia.

The defeat of German, Italian, and Vichy French forces in North Africa allowed the 416th to move with other allied forces into Italy in September 1943. During its first year there, the squadron patrolled harbors and escorted shipping; however, in September 1944 the 416th shifted to more aggressive activities to provide defensive cover for the American Fifth Army and make intruder sweeps into enemy territory. It also continued defensive patrols and offensive night attacks on Axis positions on Sardinia, Corsica, and in Southern France.

=== Foo fighter incidents ===
On February 17 1945 a foo fighter was seen over La Spezia in Italy. A detachment of the squadron was flying from the 425th Night Fighter Squadron at the Étain Air Base in France, to the squadron base at Pisa, now Pisa International Airport. The detachment of De Havilland Mosquito aircraft had been asked to assist with the Battle of the Bulge, in eastern France. Orange-red lights were seen at 10,000 ft, at 9.30pm. Multiple lights were seen.

Further 'foo fighter' lights were seen by the squadron at 12.45am on February 21 1945 at 5,000 ft over Piacenza. On February 22 1945 at 4,000 ft over Parma, a 'stationary' rotating white light was seen.

=== Post war ===
With the fall of Germany, the unit became part of the United States Air Forces in Europe army of occupation. It moved in August 1945 to AAF Station Hörsching, Austria, for occupation duties. A year later, the 416th relocated to AAF Station Schweinfurt, Germany, where it inactivated on 9 November 1946, when it was inactivated and its personnel, equipment and aircraft transferred to the 2d Fighter Squadron.

=== Cold War ===
The squadron was reactivated on 1 January 1953 at George Air Force Base, California as a fighter bomber squadron. The squadron replaced the 186th Fighter-Bomber Squadron, an Air National Guard unit which had been called to active duty for the Korean War and was being returned to state control. Initially equipped with North American F-51D Mustang aircraft, the 416th quickly converted to North American F-86 Sabre jet aircraft and started participating in air defense operations, exercises, and firepower demonstrations. Then in September 1953, the 416th received Arctic indoctrination at Eielson Air Force Base, Alaska. Next, the squadron joined its parent unit, the 21st Fighter-Bomber Group, in Operation Boxkite at North Field, South Carolina from 17 April to 15 May 1954.

The 416th moved to France in November–December 1954. For this move, the ground echelon left George on 26 November and arrived at Toul-Rosières Air Base on 12 December. The flight echelon left George on 13 December and traveled to France by the northern air route. Bad weather, however, delayed the movement, and the flight element did not reach Toul until 22 February 1955. From then until December 1957, the squadron participated in NATO tactical operations and exercises, stood air defense alert, and periodically deployed aircraft and crews to Wheelus Air Base, Libya, for fighter weapons training. The unit was not operational from 10 January until inactivating on 8 February 1958.

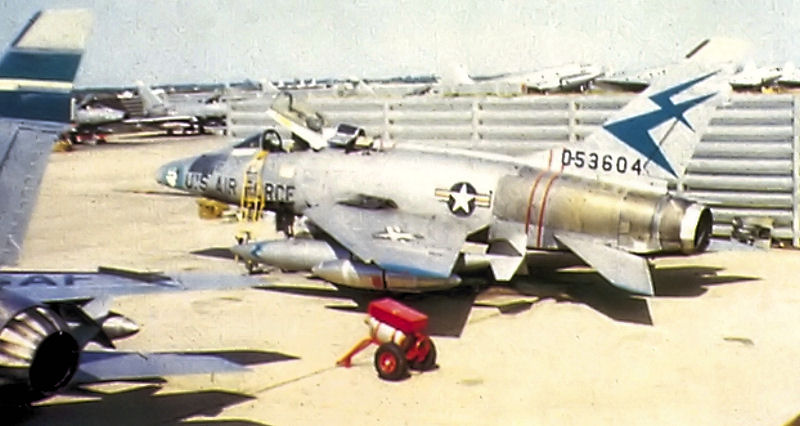
416th F-100 Super Sabre at Kunsan AB, South Korea (Note: Aircraft is North American F-100D, serial 55-3604.)

On 25 March 1958, the 416th activated under Fifth Air Force at Misawa Air Base, Japan, where it started converting from Republic F-84G Thunderjets to North American F-100 Super Sabres. Later in July, the squadron joined the 21st Fighter-Bomber Wing; however, the USAF directed the 416th to transfer its F-100s to another unit. This order temporarily interrupted its conversion and forced the 416th to fly F-84Gs until May 1959, when a full complement of F-100s arrived. During this period in the Far East, the units crews flew tactical operations and exercises in South Korea, Taiwan, Okinawa, Singapore, the Philippines, and other places in the Far East.

=== Vietnam War ===
In June 1964, the 416th moved to England Air Force Base, Louisiana, where it joined the 3d Tactical Fighter Wing. From 17 October through 7 December 1964, the squadron deployed a flight to Takhli Royal Thai Air Force Base, Thailand, where it operated under various higher headquarters. This deployment, however, was just a precursor to even greater involvement in Southeast Asia (SEA) as the entire squadron deployed there in March 1965. It operated in turn from Clark Air Base, Philippines, Da Nang Air Base, South Vietnam, Bien Hoa Air Base, South Vietnam, and again at Clark until July 1965, when it returned to England AFB. While in SEA, the unit flew 1,711 combat sorties between 19 March and 14 July to fly flak suppression, weather reconnaissance, MiG combat air patrol, and air strike missions. During one of these combat air patrol missions, a 416th TFS F-100D piloted by Don Kilgus is presumed to have shot down a MiG-17 during a strike against the Thanh Hóa Bridge on 4 April, 1965.

The 416th deployed with the 3d Wing to SEA in November 1965 to Tan Son Nhut Air Base, South Vietnam. There, the 6250th Combat Support Group controlled the squadron's operations until June 1966, when it rejoined the 3d at Bien Hoa. The 416th remained at Bien Hoa until its April 1967 reassignment to the 37th Tactical Fighter Wing. In May, the squadron moved to Phù Cát Air Base without a break in combat missions.

==== Forward air control assignments ====
On 15 June 1967, Detachment 1 of the squadron became the nucleus of Operation Commando Sabre, a special activity using F-100F two-seat trainers to fly fast Forward Air Control (FAC) operations using the call sign Misty. From the 16th to the 28th, they learned aerial refueling techniques. The unit's participation in Commando Sabre continued after the detachment moved to Tuy Hoa Air Base and they came under the operational control of the 31st Tactical Fighter Wing.

As the U.S. Air Force's original "Fast FAC" effort, they were pioneers. The original 16 Mistys were flight leader qualified with over 100 combat missions to their credit; four of them were already trained as FACs. After this quartet trained the other dozen, planes from this detachment would fly missions into North Vietnam's Route Package 1 or against the defenses of the Ho Chi Minh Trail in Operation Steel Tiger. The Misty pilots committed to serving for either 120 days or 75 FAC sorties, whichever came first. Their standard operating profile of 450 Knots indicated air speed at 4,500 feet altitude above ground level allowed their survival where slow FACs dared not venture.

The Mistys having proved their worth, an attempt to expand the detachment began in August 1967. Only one additional F-100F was located to transfer to the unit. Nevertheless, by April 1968, Misty FACs had flown 565 FAC sorties against the Mu Gia Pass and the Ban Karai Pass and directed 850 air strikes against this northern end of the Ho Chi Minh Trail. The 1 April 1968 cessation of bombing north of the 20th Parallel intensified operations in Route Package 1 and increased the Misty FAC workload.

On 1 June 1968, the Mistys began the loan of their services to the U.S. Navy for Operation Sea Dragon. On 11 June 1968, the Mistys began the first night Fast FAC missions of the war. On the nights of 13 and 14 June, they tested a Starlight Scope for FAC operations. The preliminary results seemed promising, so the Mistys began flying missions with the Scope in the rear seat with the observer on 8 July. As it turned out, the Scope was too bulky for easy use, and did not work in moonless periods. A Misty was lost in action on 16 August 1968, and another the following night. The night FAC mission not having observed anything more than an ordinary fighter pilot, it was cancelled after this second loss.

On 12 August 1968, the Misty FACs began training two aircraft commanders from the 366th Fighter Wing as FACs. On 2 September 1968, the first "Stormy" FACs began controlling in Route Package 1. With 1 November 1968 halt of bombing North Vietnamese targets, the Mistys ceased operations in Route Package 1 and shifted their FAC mission towards the Ho Chi Minh Trail. By that time, the Misty FACs had flown 1,441 combat sorties, directed 3,988 air strikes, and lost nine airplanes.

From 1 November 1968 until June 1969, the Mistys flew 1,530 combat sorties and directed 2,321 air strikes against the Ho Chi Minh Trail. Plagued by shortages of aircraft, the Mistys stood down on 14 May 1970. By that time, about a quarter of the 93 Misty FAC pilots had been shot down, though most had been rescued. The Fast FAC concept having been proven, other Fast FAC units had taken up the fight.

In the meantime, the 416th still flew regular combat missions, logging its 30,000th Southeast Asia combat sortie on 20 April 1970. Most of those missions involved close air support or direct air support. The unit stood down from combat operations on 5 September 1970, and its resources were transferred to other units.

=== Tactical Air Command ===
On 28 September 1970, the squadron returned without personnel to England Air Force Base, Louisiana. Anticipating the 416th's reassignment, the 4403d Tactical Fighter Wing at England had begun forming a new squadron cadre in August 1970. This cadre started training its pilots to instructor status and was immediately available when the Air Force transferred the 416th. After receiving more equipment and people, the 416th achieved combat ready status and began normal participation in exercises and other tactical operations.

Inactivation appeared imminent again as the Air Force phased the last F-100s out of its inventory. By December 1971, the 416th was the only active flying squadron in the 4403d Wing. On 1 April 1972, its operational training commitment ended, and as a result the Air Force transferred its personnel to other units and its aircraft to the Air National Guard. From May 1972 until its 1 July inactivation, the 416th served as a holding unit for a new LTV A-7D Corsair II squadron that would replace it.

Redesignated the 416th Tactical Fighter Training Squadron, the unit activated again on 15 March 1979 under the 479th Tactical Training Wing at Holloman Air Force Base, New Mexico. At Holloman, the squadron used Northrop AT-38 Talon aircraft to provide transitional training to new pilots preparing for assignment to operational fighter wings. The 416th inactivated on 1 September 1983 as the 433d Tactical Fighter Training Squadron assumed its mission.

=== Stealth Operations ===
==== Development Background ====
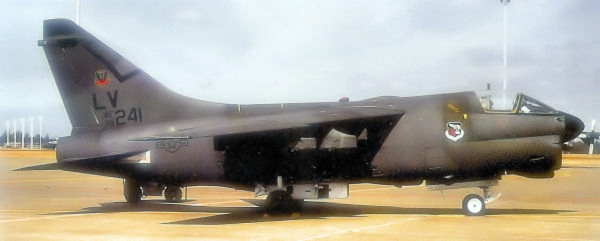
4451st Tactical Sq A-7D Corsair II (Note: Aircraft is LTV A-7D Corsair II, serial 69-6241.)

"P-Unit" was established by Tactical Air Command at Groom Lake, Nevada as a classified unit on 15 October 1979. It received LTV A-7D Corsair II fighters from the 23d Tactical Fighter Wing at England Air Force Base, Louisiana to use as training aircraft for the Lockheed F-117A Nighthawk stealth fighter, then under development. The unit performed training for pilots to transition to the single-seat, subsonic F-117. Was given designation of 4451st Test Squadron on 11 July 1981, and assigned to the 4450th Test Group (later 4450th Tactical Group) which was formed to bring the F-117 from development to operational status.

The squadron moved to Tonopah Test Range Airport on 28 October 1983, performing training missions with the F-117A in a clandestine environment. It performed the dual mission of training F-117 pilots with the A-7Ds as well as providing a cover story for the classified Stealth Fighter project. All Tonopah training flights were conducted at night under the cover of darkness until late 1988. On 10 November 1988, the Air Force brought the F-117A from secrecy by publicly acknowledging its existence, but provided few details about it. The official confirmation of the F-117A's existence, however, had little impact on Tonopah operations. Pilots began occasionally flying the F-117A during the day, but personnel were still ferried to and from work each Monday and Friday from Nellis Air Force Base, Nevada. (Note: The units were officially located at Nellis.) Everyone associated with the project was still forbidden to talk about what they did for a living, and the program remained shrouded in secrecy.

The squadron operated at Tonopah with A-7Ds until late 1989 when F-117 project was revealed to the public. It retired its Corsairs, being the last active duty USAF squadron to operate the A-7, and transitioned to the Northrop T-38 Talon.

==== Stealth Operations ====
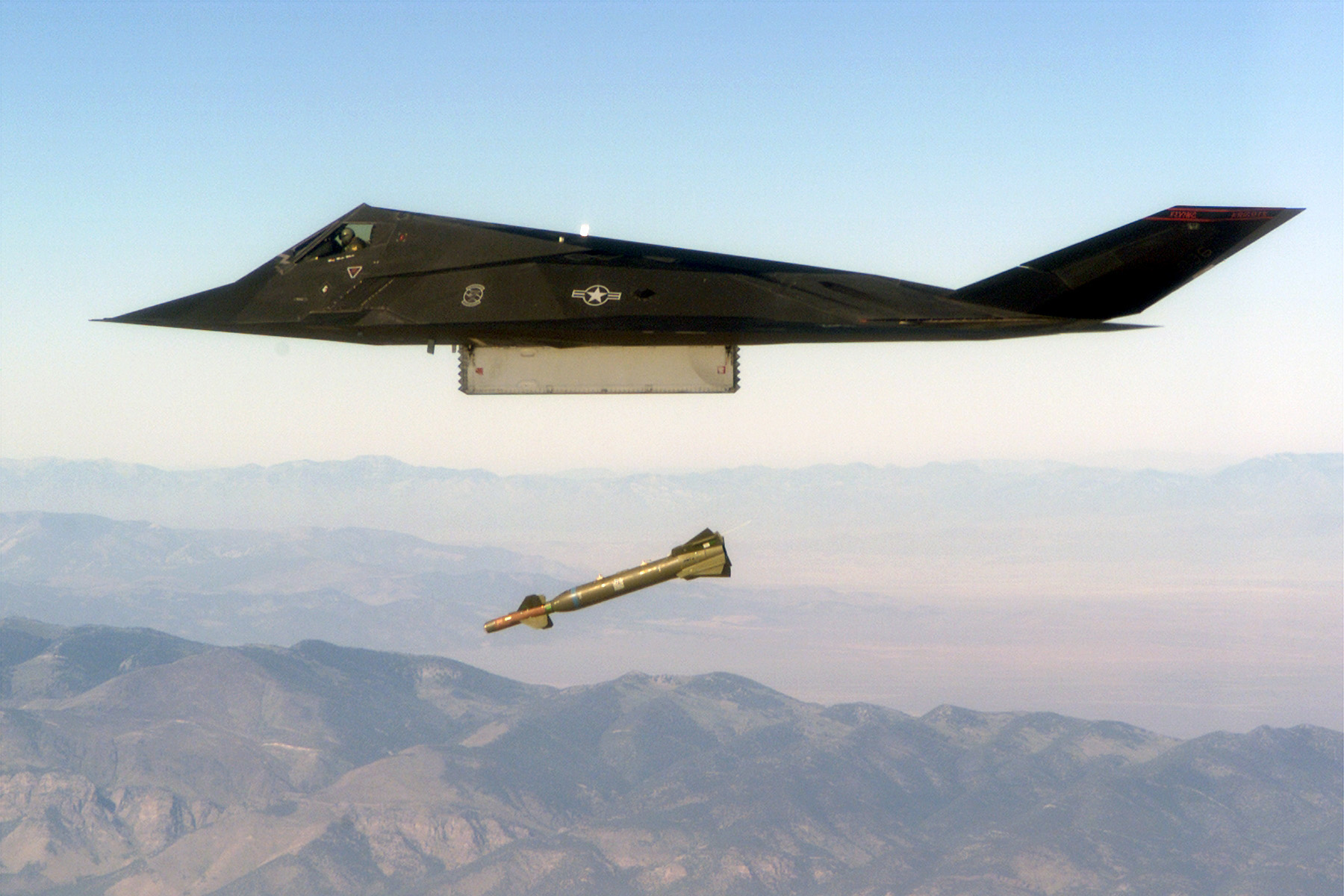
An F-117 Nighthawk drops a GBU-28 guided bomb

The 4451st Squadron was inactivated and replaced by the 416th Tactical Fighter Squadron on 5 October 1989 when the 4450th Tactical Group was inactivated, and F-117A operations came under the 37th Tactical Fighter Wing. It assumed the mission of the 4451st Test Squadron became one of two operational F-117A Stealth Fighter squadrons.

On 19 December 1989, just 13 months after the Pentagon had disclosed the existence of the F-117A, squadron aircraft were first used in combat during Operation Just Cause. In mid-December 1990, it deployed to King Khalid International Airport, Saudi Arabia as part of the buildup of United States forces prior to Operation Desert Storm. It flew combat operations over Iraq against high-priority targets in January and February 1991. After combat operations ceased in February 1991, some personnel and aircraft remained on indefinite alert in Saudi Arabia as a component member of the post-Desert Storm task force in Southwest Asia, although most returned to Tonopah by the end of March.

After Desert Storm, the Air Force redesignated the squadron as the 416th Fighter Squadron on 1 October 1991. The following month, under the Objective Wing reorganization, the squadron realigned from the wing to the 37th Operations Group on 1 November 1991. In 1992, as part of the post Cold War budget cutbacks in the Air Force, the F-117As moved to Holloman Air Force Base, New Mexico. The 37th Fighter Wing and its subordinate squadrons were inactivated in July 1993. The aircraft, equipment, personnel and mission of the squadron were transferred to the 8th Fighter Squadron, which was simultaneously activated.

== Lineage ==
- Constituted as the 416th Night Fighter Squadron on 17 February 1943

Activated on 20 February 1943
Inactivated on 9 November 1946

- Redesignated 416th Fighter-Bomber Squadron on 15 November 1952

Activated on 1 January 1953
Inactivated on 8 February 1958

- Activated on 25 March 1958

Redesignated 416th Tactical Fighter Squadron on 1 July 1958
Inactivated on: 16 June 1964

- Activated 15 April 1967

Discontinued 1 July 1972

- Redesignated 416th Tactical Fighter Training Squadron on 8 March 1979
- Activated on 15 March 1979

Inactivated 1 September 1983

- Redesignated 416th Tactical Fighter Squadron on 15 September 1989

Activated on 5 October 1989
Redesignated 416th Fighter Squadron on 1 November 1991
Inactivated on 1 July 1993

=== Assignments ===
- Air Defense Department, Army Air Forces School of Applied Tactics, 20 February 1943
- VIII Fighter Command (attached to the Royal Air Force), 11 May 1943
- Twelfth Air Force, 8 August 1943 (attached to Northwest African Coastal Air Force, 8 August 1943; Tunis Fighter Sector, 9 August 1943; Bone Fighter Sector, 17 August – 15 September 1943; 286 Wing, RAF, 28 September 1943
- 62d Fighter Wing, 28 January 1944 (Detachments attached to 6505th Fighter Control Area (Provisional), 27 June – 4 September 1944; 63d Fighter Wing, 14–23 August 1944; 6504th Fighter Control Area (Provisional), 1–13 September 1944; 6502d Fighter Control Area (Provisional), 1–14 September 1944; 425th Night Fighter Squadron, 4 January – 20 February 1945)

XXII Tactical Air Command, 1 April 1945

- 70th Fighter Wing, 17 August 1945
- 64th Fighter Wing, 15 August – 9 November 1946 (attached to All-Weather Fighter Group (Provisional), 64th Fighter Wing)
- 21st Fighter-Bomber Group, 1 January 1953 – 8 February 1958
- Fifth Air Force, 25 March 1958
- 21st Tactical Fighter Wing, 1 July 1958
- 39th Air Division, 18 June 1960
- 3d Tactical Fighter Wing, 16 June 1964
- 834th Air Division, 1 November 1965
- 6250th Tactical Fighter Wing, 1 November 1965
- 3d Tactical Fighter Wing, 1 June 1966
- 37th Tactical Fighter Wing, 15 April 1967 – 27 May 1969
- 31st Tactical Fighter Wing, 28 May 1969 – 26 September 1970 (nonoperational after 5 September 1970)
- 49th Tactical Fighter Wing, 17 March 1979 – 1 September 1983
- 37th Tactical Fighter Wing, 5 October 1989 – 1 November 1991
- 37th Operations Group, 1 November 1991 – 1 July 1993

=== Stations ===
- Orlando Army Air Base, Florida, 20 February – 26 April 1943
- RAF Honiley, England, 13 May 1943 (detachments at RAF Cranfield, England; RAF Usworth, England; and Bath, (AAF-380) England, 13 May – 10 June 1943; and Bristol (AAF-473), England, 14 May – 4 June 1943)
- RAF Acklington, England, 11 June – 4 August 1943
- Maison Blanche Airport, Algeria, 8 August 1943
- Bone Airfield, Algeria, 17 August 1943
- Bizerte Airfield, Tunisia, 15 September 1943
- Catania Airport, Sicily, Italy, 21 September 1943
- Lecce Airfield, Italy, 27 September 1943
- Grottaglie Airfield, Italy, 30 September 1943 (detachment at Rerhaia Airfield, Algeria, 27 December 1943 – 25 January 1944
- Pomigliano Airfield, Italy, c. 28 January 1944 (detachments at Tre Cancello Landing Strip, Italy, 14 June – 8 July 1944; Tarquinia Airfield, Italy, 8 July – 4 September 1944; Alghero Airfield, Sardinia, Italy, 14–22 August 1944; Borgo Airfield, Corsica, France, 14–23 August 1944
- Rosignano Airfield, Italy, c. 1 September 1944 (detachment at Pomigliano Airfield, Italy, 1–9 September 1944)
- Pisa Airdrome, Italy, 1 October 1944 (detachment at Verdun-Étain Airfield (A-82) (AAF-393), France, 4 January – 20 February 1945)
- Pontedera Airfield, Italy, 27 March 1945
- AAF Station Hörsching, Austria (R-87), 13 August 1945
- AAF Station Schweinfurt, Germany (R-25), 20 August – 9 November 1946
- George Air Force Base, California, 1 January 1953
- Toul-Rosières Air Base, France, 12 December 1953
- Chambley-Bussieres Air Base, France, 14 June 1955 – 8 February 1958
- Misawa Air Base, Japan, 25 March 1958 – 16 June 1964
- England Air Force Base, Louisiana, 16 June 1964 (deployed to Da Nang Air Base, South Vietnam, 31 March – 15 June 1965; Bien Hoa Air Base, South Vietnam, 15 June – 15 July 1965)
- Tan Son Nhut Airport, South Vietnam, 16 November 1965
- Bien Hoa Air Base, South Vietnam, 1 June 1966
- Phu Cat Air Base, South Vietnam, 29 May 1967
- Tuy Hoa Air Base, South Vietnam, 27 May 1969
- England Air Force Base, Louisiana, 15 September 1970 (Note: Breslin gives arrival at England as 15 September 1979. [sic]) – 1 July 1972
- Holloman Air Force Base, New Mexico, 15 March 1979 – 1 September 1983
- Tonopah Test Range Airport, Nevada, 3 October 1989 – 9 May 1992 (operated from King Khalid International Airport, Saudi Arabia, 19 August 1990 – 1 April 1991)
- Holloman Air Force Base, New Mexico, 9 May 1992 – 1 July 1993

=== Aircraft ===
- Douglas A-20 Havoc, 1943
- Douglas P-70 Havoc, 1943
- Bristol Beaufighter, 1943–1944
- de Havilland Mosquito, 1944–1945
- North American A-36 Apache, 1945
- Northrop P-61 Black Widow, 1945–1946
- Douglas A-26 Invader, 1946
- North American F-51 Mustang, 1953
- North America F-86 Sabre, 1953–1958
- Republic F-84 Thunderjet, 1958–1959
- North American F-100 Super Sabre, 1959–1964, 1967–1969
- Northrop AT-38 Talon, 1970-1983, 1989-1990
- Lockheed F-117 Nighthawk, 1990–1993
