= Cassibile Airfield =

Abandoned World War II military airfield in Italy

Cassibile Airfield
- Part of Twelfth Air Force

Site information
- Type: Military Airfield
- Controlled by: United States Army Air Forces

Location
- Coordinates: 36°58′54.45″N 015°14′23.12″E

Site history
- Built: 1943
- In use: 1943

Location of Cassibile Airfield, Italy

Cassibile Airfield is an abandoned World War II military airfield in Italy, which is located in the vicinity of Syracuse on the island of Sicily. Its precise location was unknown until, in June 2012, Mr. Lorenzo Bovi had identified the precise location in "Torre Cuba", which was 3km west from Cassibile.

It was an all-weather temporary field built by the United States Army Air Force XII Engineer Command using a graded earth compacted surface, with a prefabricated hessian (burlap) surfacing known as PHS. PHS was made of an asphalt-impregnated jute which was rolled out over the compacted surface over a square mesh track (SMT) grid of wire joined in 3-inch squares. Pierced Steel Planking was also used for parking areas, as well as for dispersal sites, when it was available. In addition, tents were used for billeting and also for support facilities; an access road was built to the existing road infrastructure; a dump for supplies, ammunition, and gasoline drums, along with a drinkable water and minimal electrical grid for communications and station lighting.

Once completed, the Cassibile Airfield was turned over for use by the Twelfth Air Force 415th Night Fighter Squadron between September 5-November 5 1943, during which time Bristol Beaufighters flew night interceptor missions against Axis aircraft during the Sicilian and Italian Campaigns.

When the American occupation of the area had withdrawn, the airfield was dismantled by engineers. Today, only the medieval watchtower used as a control tower remains; all the surrounding fields which were used as runways and aprons are used for agricultural purposes.
