= Tre Cancello Landing Strip =

Abandoned military airfield in Italy

Tre Cancello Landing Strip
- Part of Twelfth Air Force

Site information
- Type: Military airfield
- Controlled by: United States Army Air Forces

Location
- Coordinates: 41°29′59.57″N 012°43′36.78″E (Approximate)

Site history
- Built: 1943
- In use: 1943

Location of Tre Cancello Landing Strip, Italy

Tre Cancello Landing Strip is an abandoned World War II military airfield in Italy, which is located approximately 11 km (6.8 mi) east-northeast of Anzio; about 50 km (31 mi) south-southeast of Rome. It was a temporary grass airfield used by the United States Army Air Force Twelfth Air Force 416th Night Fighter Squadron between 14 June and 8 July 1944, flying Bristol Beaufighters on night defensive interceptor patrols during the Anzio landing.

When the Americans pulled out the airfield was dismantled by engineers and returned to agriculture. An outline of the runway remains in an agricultural field in aerial photos today.
