= Solonzara Airfield =

WWII military airfield in Corsica

Solenzara Airfield
- Part of Twelfth Air Force

Site information
- Type: Military airfield
- Controlled by: United States Army Air Forces

Location
- Coordinates: 41°51′08.90″N 009°21′24.05″E (Approximate)

Site history
- Built: 1944
- In use: 1944

Location of Solonzara Airfield, France

Solenzara Airfield is an abandoned World War II military airfield in France, which is located approximately 31 km north-northeast of Porto-Vecchio on Corsica. It was a temporary airfield used by the United States Army Air Force Twelfth Air Force 415th Night Fighter Squadron between 9 July-1 September, flying Bristol Beaufighters.

When the Americans pulled out the airfield was dismantled by engineers. Today the location of the airfield is abandoned and is a grass pasture.
