= Piombino Airfield =

Former military airfield

Piombino Airfield
- Part of Twelfth Air Force

Site information
- Type: Military airfield
- Controlled by: United States Army Air Forces

Location
- Coordinates: 42°56′28.47″N 010°31′40.68″E (Approximate)

Site history
- Built: 1944
- In use: 1944

Location of Piombino Airfield, Italy

Piombino Airfield is an abandoned World War II military airfield in Italy, which is located approximately 3 km north of Piombino (Provincia di Livorno, Tuscany); about 200 km northwest of Rome.

It was an all-weather temporary field built by the United States Army Air Force XII Engineer Command using a graded earth compacted surface, with a prefabricated hessian (burlap) surfacing known as PHS. PHS was made of an asphalt-impregnated jute which was rolled out over the compacted surface over a square mesh track (SMT) grid of wire joined in 3-inch squares. Pierced Steel Planking was also used for parking areas, as well as for dispersal sites, when it was available. In addition, tents were used for billeting and also for support facilities; an access road was built to the existing road infrastructure; a dump for supplies, ammunition, and gasoline drums, along with a drinkable water and minimal electrical grid for communications and station lighting.

Once completed it was turned over for use by the Twelfth Air Force 417th Night Fighter Squadron between 23 July-5 August 1944, flying Bristol Beaufighters.

When the Americans pulled out the airfield was dismantled by engineers. Today the location of the airfield is undetermined due to the large amount of urban growth in the area.
