= XXII Tactical Air Command =

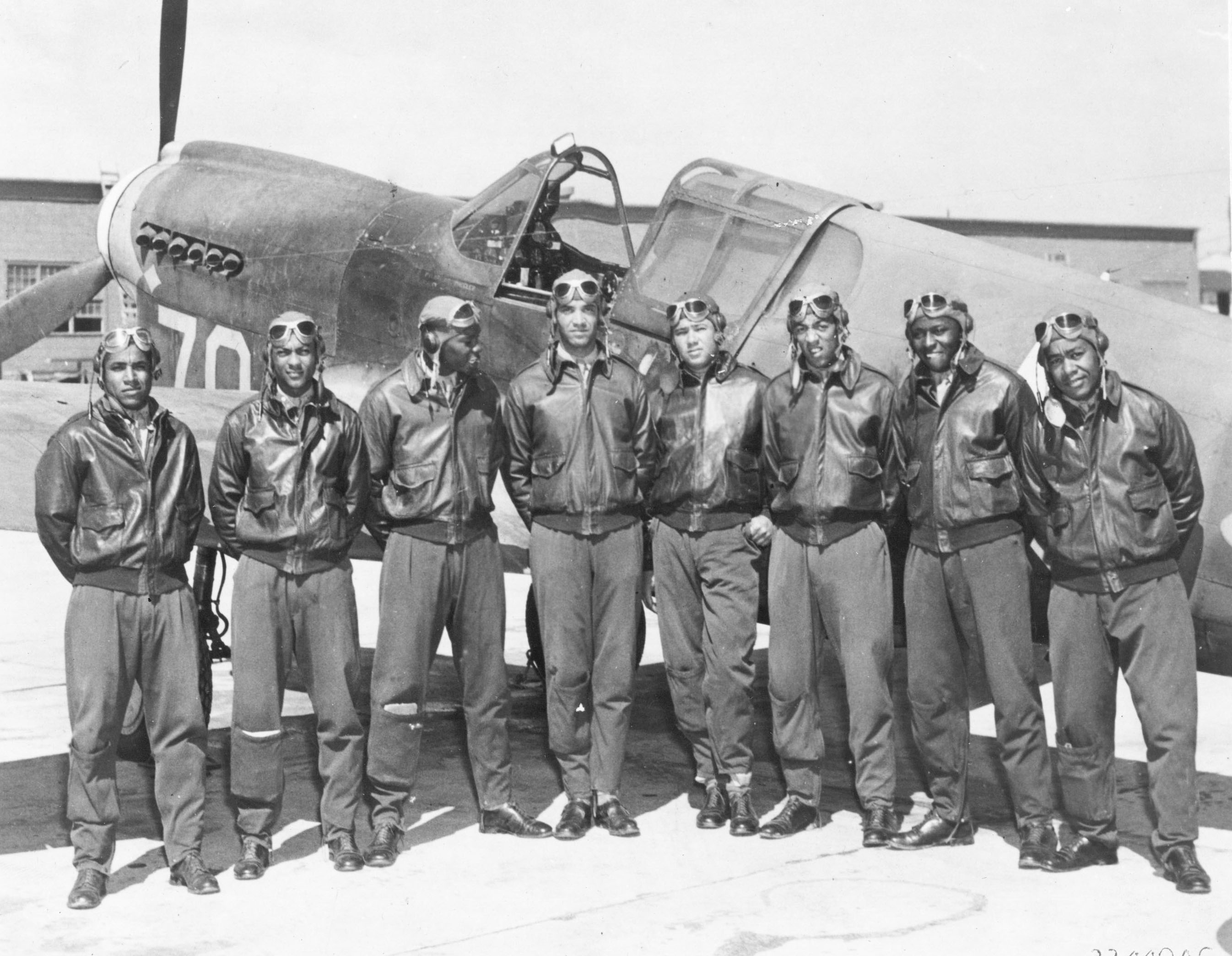
- Members of 332d Fighter Group of XII Fighter Command
- Active: 1942-1945
- Country: United States
- Branch: United States Air Force
- Role: Command of fighter and air support units
- Engagements: Mediterranean Theater of Operations

Commanders
- Notable commanders: Brig Gen Elwood Richard Quesada; Brig Gen Benjamin W. Chidlaw

The XXII Tactical Air Command is an inactive United States Air Force unit. Its last assignment was with Twelfth Air Force, at Pomigliano Airfield, Italy, where it was inactivated on 4 October 1945.

The command was formed in the southeast United States in early 1942. It moved to the United Kingdom in September 1942 and to North Africa during October–November 1942. Served in combat in the Mediterranean theater until the end of the war. Inactivated in Italy

== Lineage ==
- Constituted as the 12th Interceptor Command on 26 February 1942

Activated on 5 March 1942
Redesignated 12th Fighter Command 15 May 1942
Redesignated XII Fighter Command c. 24 September 1942
Redesignated XXII Tactical Air Command in November 1944
Inactivated on 4 October 1945
Disbanded on 8 October 1948

=== Assignments ===
- Third Air Force, 5 March 1942
- Twelfth Air Force, 12 September 1942 – 4 October 1945 (attached to Eighth Air Force, 12 September-26 October 1942)

=== Stations ===
- Drew Field, Florida, 5 March-27 August 1942
- RAF Wattisham, England, 12 September 1942
- RAF Bushey Hall, England, 17 September-26 October 1942
- Oran Tafaraoui Airport, Algeria, 8 November 1942
- La Senia Airfield, Algeria, 12 November 1942
- Tebessa Airfield, Algeria, December 1942
- La Senia Airfield, Algeria, 12 January 1943
- Algiers, Algeria, 20 March 1943
- Caserta, Italy, 14 July 1944
- Florence Airfield, Italy, 15 September 1944
- Pomigliano Airfield, Italy, August-4 October 1945

=== Components ===
Wings

- 1st Air Defense Wing (later 62d Fighter Wing): 30 January 1943 – 12 September 1945
- 2d Air Defense Wing (later 63d Fighter Wing): 27 January 1943 – 14 June 1945
- 3rd Air Defense Wing: 22 February – 9 March 1943
- 87th Fighter Wing: 11 January 1944 – 1 April 1945.

Groups

- 1st Fighter Group: 14 September – 24 December 1942
- 14th Fighter Group: 14 September – 11 December 1942
- 31st Fighter Group: 27 September – November 1942
- 33d Fighter Group: 6 December 1942 – 13 January 1943
- 47th Bombardment Group: 15 September 1944 – 7 June 1945
- 52d Fighter Group: 14 September 1942 – 18 February 1943 (attached to Tunis Fighter Sector after c. 19 January 1943)
- 79th Fighter Group: assigned 20 September 1944 – 1 October 1944 (attached to 64th Fighter Wing to 30 September 1944); attached 12 May – 7 June 1945
- 86th Fighter Group: 15 September 1944 – 20 February 1945
- 332d Fighter Group: 15 September 1944 – 20 February 1945

Squadrons

- 1st Emergency Rescue Squadron, 12 March − 1 October 1944 (attached to Mediterranean Allied Coastal Air Force after 14 September 1944)
- 414th Night Fighter Squadron: 1 April – 7 June 1945
- 417th Night Fighter Squadron: 1 April – 17 August 1945
- 350th Fighter Group:The group operated with Twelfth Air Force from January 1943 until the end of the war with three subordinate Squadrons, the 345th, 346th and 347th; The First Brazilian Fighter Squadron joined the 350th Fighter Group as a fourth squadron in October 1944.
