= 63rd Fighter Wing =

63d Fighter Wing
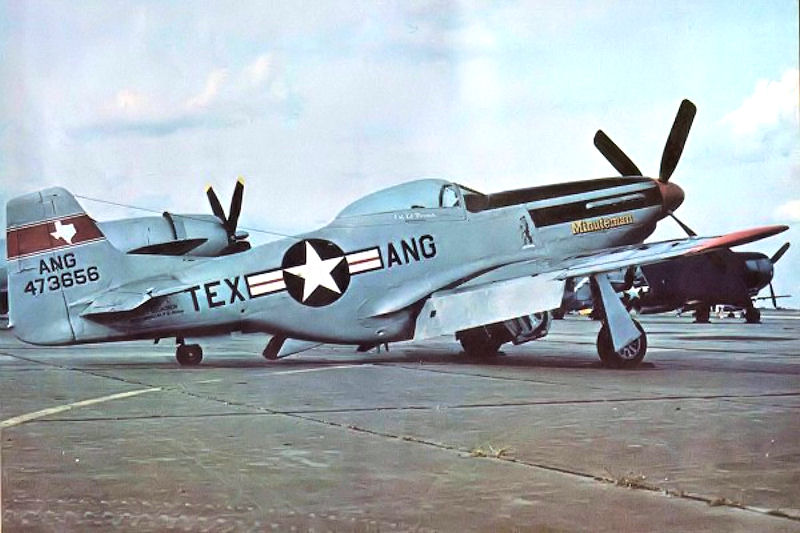
- 111th Fighter Squadron, F-51D Mustang 44-73656, Ellington Field, Houston, Texas, 1948
- Active: 1942–1945; 1946–1950
- Country: United States
- Branch: United States Air Force
- Type: Wing
- Role: Command and Control
- Part of: Texas Air National Guard
- Engagements: World War II

The 63d Fighter Wing (63 FW) is a disbanded unit of the United States Air Force, last stationed at Ellington Field, Houston, Texas. It was withdrawn from the Texas Air National Guard (TX ANG) and inactivated on October 11, 1950.

This wing is not related to the 63d Troop Carrier Wing, Medium, or subsequent units that was constituted on May 10,1949 and activated on June 27,1949.

== History ==
The wing was first organized as a command and control organization for Twelfth Air Force during World War II. It was deployed to Algeria in January 1943, and initially used to organize air defense units. It was transferred to XII Fighter Command and controlled fighter groups engaged in escort, patrol, strafing, and reconnaissance missions against enemy forces in North Africa. Later moved to Italy and a participant in the Italian Campaign, the Rhone Valley Campaign in Southern France, and finally the Western Allied Invasion of Germany in the spring of 1945. The 63d Fighter Wing was finally inactivated in November 1945.

The wing was allocated to the Texas Air National Guard for command and control origination for units in the South Central region (Texas, Oklahoma, Louisiana) of the United States. It was extended federal recognition and activated on May 24,1946.

In October 1950, the Air National Guard converted to the wing-base (Hobson Plan) organization. As a result, the wing was withdrawn from the Texas ANG and was inactivated on October 31,1950. Its assigned units were federalized as a result of the Korean War and assigned to USAF Major Commands.

== Lineage, assignments, and components ==
- Constituted as 2d Air Defense Wing on 12 December 1942 and activated the same day.

Re-designated 63d Fighter Wing in July 1943
Inactivated on 11 December 1945.

- Allotted to the Texas ANG on 24 May 1946

Extended federal recognition and activated on 23 May 1948
Inactivated, and returned to the control of the Department of the Air Force, on 31 October 1950

- Disbanded on 15 June 1983

=== Assignments ===
- First Air Force, 12 December 1942
- XXII Tactical Air Command, 27 January 1943
- XII Tactical Air Command, 7 April 1945
- Army Service Forces, December 1945.
- Texas Air National Guard, 23 May 1949 – 31 October 1950

=== Components ===
==== World War II ====
- 52d Fighter Group: 16 November 1943 – 1 May 1944
- 350th Fighter Group: 6 January 1943 – 14 July 1945

==== Texas Air National Guard ====
- 136th Fighter Group, 23 May 1948 – 10 October 1950
- 137th Fighter Group, 23 May 1948 – 26 October 1950 (Oklahoma ANG)
- 122d Bombardment Group (Light), 23 May 1948 – 30 October 1950 (Louisiana ANG)

=== Stations ===
- Mitchel Field, New York, 12 December 1942 – 13 January 1943
- Oran Es Sénia Airport, Algeria, 27 January 1943
- Maison Blanche Airport, Algiers, Algeria, c. May 1943
- Rerhaia Airfield, Algeria, 8 August 1943
- Bastia, Corsica, c. October 1943
- San Pietro a Patierno (Naples), Italy, c. 15 October 1944
- Vittel, France, 22 November 1944
- Heidelberg, Germany, c. 7 April 1945
- Schwäbisch Hall, Germany, 14 June 1945
- Darmstadt, Germany, 17 July 1945 – unknown
- Camp Kilmer, New Jersey, December – 11 December 1945.
- Ellington Field, Texas, 23 May 1949 – 31 October 1950
