= 87th Fighter Wing =

- Active: 1943–1945
- Country: United States
- Branch: United States Army Air Forces
- Type: Command and Control
- Engagements: World War II

The 87th Fighter Wing is an inactive United States Air Force unit. Its last assignment was with the XXII Tactical Air Command, based at Florence, Italy. It was inactivated on 11 October 1950.

== History ==
=== Lineage ===
- Constituted as 87th Fighter Wing on 14 October 1943

Activated on 25 October 1943
Disbanded in Italy on 1 April 1945

=== Assignments ===
- First Air Force, 25 October – 15 December 1943
- XXII Tactical Air Command, 11 January 1944 – 1 April 1945

=== Stations ===
- Mitchel Field, New York, 25 October – 15 December 1943
- Nouvion Airfield, Algeria, 11 January 1944
- Caserta (Naples), Italy, February 1944
- Bastia, Corsica, 28 March 1944
- Vescovato, Corsica, 9 May 1944
- Furiani, Corsica, 13 July 1944
- Caserta, Italy, 22 September 1944
- Florence Airfield, Italy, 25 December 1944 – 1 April 1945.

=== Components ===
- 57th Fighter Group: 23 April – 10 September 1944
- 79th Fighter Group: June-25 August 1944
- 86th Fighter Group: 9–15 September 1944

=== Operations ===
Formed at Mitchel Field, New York. Moved overseas to Algeria, December 1943 – January 1944, and operated with Twelfth Air Force in the Mediterranean theater, primarily directing tactical fighter groups in Italy from April 1944 until the wing's groups were reassigned in September 1944 to XXII Tactical Air Command. Existed as a paper unit until inactivation in April 1945.
