= 62nd Fighter Wing =

62d Fighter Wing
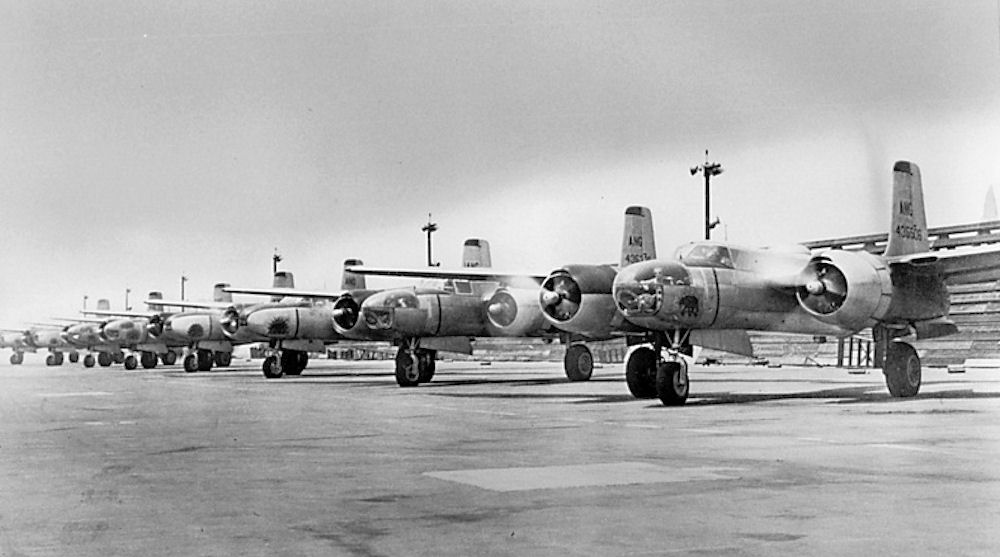
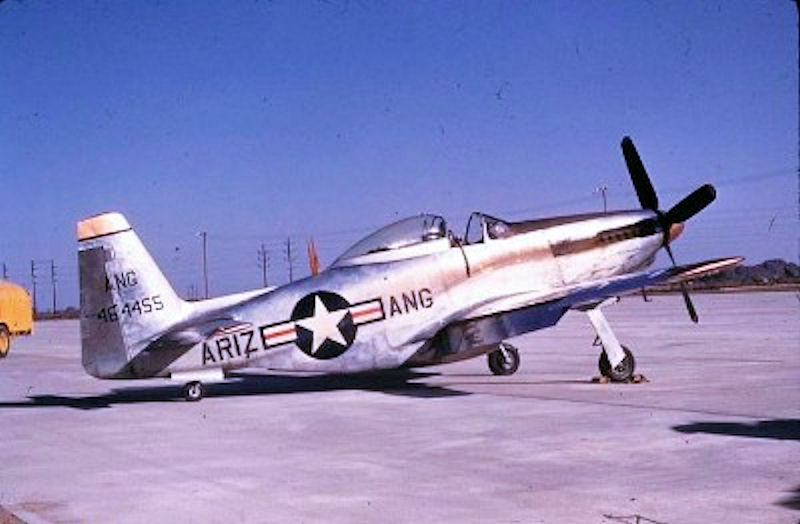
- 115th Bombardment Squadron (Light) Douglas B-26 Invaders, Van Nuys Airport, California, 1948 197th Fighter Squadron F-51H Mustang 44-64455, Luke AFB, Arizona, 1947
- Active: 1942–1945; 1946–1950
- Country: United States
- Branch: United States Air Force
- Type: Wing
- Role: Command and Control
- Part of: California Air National Guard
- Engagements: World War II

The 62d Fighter Wing (62 FW) is a disbanded unit of the United States Air Force, last stationed at Van Nuys Airport, Van Nuys, California. It was withdrawn from the California Air National Guard (CA ANG) and inactivated on 31 October 1950.

This wing is not related to the 62d Troop Carrier Wing or subsequent units that was constituted on 28 July 1947 and activated on 15 August 1947.

== History ==
=== World War II ===
Formed at Mitchel Field, New York in December 1942. Departed New York 13 January 1943 via New York Port of Embarkation. Arrived Casablanca, French Morocco on 30 January 1943 and assigned to Twelfth Air Force. Primary mission was fighter escort; air defense using night fighter units; harbor protection; homing of lost aircraft and air-sea rescue. Inactivated in Italy in September 1945.

=== Air National Guard ===
Allocated to the California Air National Guard for command and control origination for units in the Southwest Region (Southern California, Arizona) of the United States. Extended federal recognition and activated on 14 September 1950.

At the end of October 1950, the Air National Guard converted to the wing-base Hobson Plan organization. As a result, the wing was withdrawn from the California ANG and was inactivated on 31 October 1950. The 146th Composite Wing was established by the National Guard Bureau, allocated to the state of California, recognized and activated 1 November 1950; assuming the personnel, equipment and mission of the inactivated 62d Fighter Wing.

=== Lineage ===
- Constituted as 1st Air Defense Wing on 12 December 1942 and activated the same day.

Redesignated 62d Fighter Wing in July 1943.
Inactivated in Italy on 12 September 1945

- Allotted to the California ANG on 24 May 1946

Extended federal recognition and activated on 14 September 1950
Inactivated, and returned to the control of the Department of the Air Force, on 31 October 1950

- Disbanded on 15 June 1983

=== Assignments ===
- First Air Force, 12 December 1942 – 13 January 1943
- Twelfth Air Force, 30 January 1943 – 12 September 1945
- California Air National Guard, 14 September-31 October 1950

=== Components ===
==== World War II ====
- 414th Night Fighter Squadron, 21 September 1944 – 1 April 1945
- 415th Night Fighter Squadron, 20 June – 7 August 1943; 27 September 1943 – 5 August 1944
- 416th Night Fighter Squadron, 28 January – 27 June 1944

==== California Air National Guard ====
- 146th Fighter Group, 16 September 1946 – 31 October 1950
- 115th Bombardment Squadron, 16 September 1946 – 31 October 1950

=== Stations ===
- Mitchel Field, New York, 12 December 1942 – 13 January 1943
- Casablanca Airfield, French Morocco, 30 January 1943
- Sousse Airfield, Tunisia, 14 May 1943
- Palermo Airfield, Sicily, 25 July 1943
- Naples, Italy, 20 October 1943
- Antignano, Italy, c. 15 September 1944
- Pomigliano Airfield, Italy, August-12 September 1945
- Van Nuys Airport, Van Nuys, California, 14 September-31 October 1950
