= 65th Aggressor Squadron =

US Air Force squadron

65th Aggressor Squadron

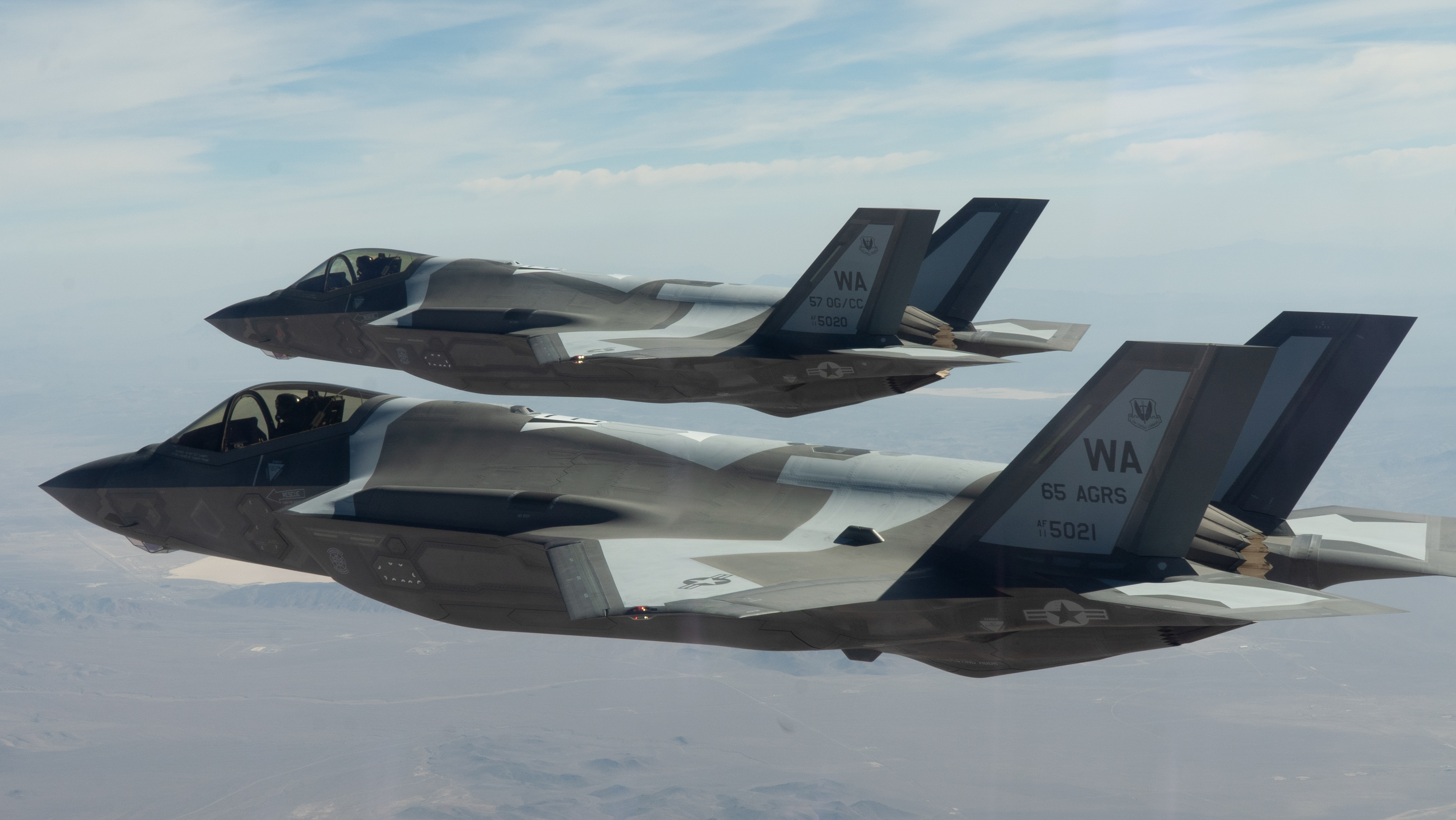
- Lockheed Martin F-35A Lightning II 11-5020 and 11-5021 en route to their inaugural training mission
- Active: 1942–1945; 1946–1958; 1969–1989; 2005–2014; 2022–present
- Country: United States
- Branch: United States Air Force
- Role: Fighter Aggressor
- Part of: Air Combat Command: United States Air Force Warfare Center; 57th Wing; 57th Operations Group
- Garrison/HQ: Nellis Air Force Base, Nevada
- Engagements: World War II – EAME Theater

- Decorations: Distinguished Unit Citation (3x) Air Force Outstanding Unit Award (3x) French Croix de Guerre with Palm

Insignia
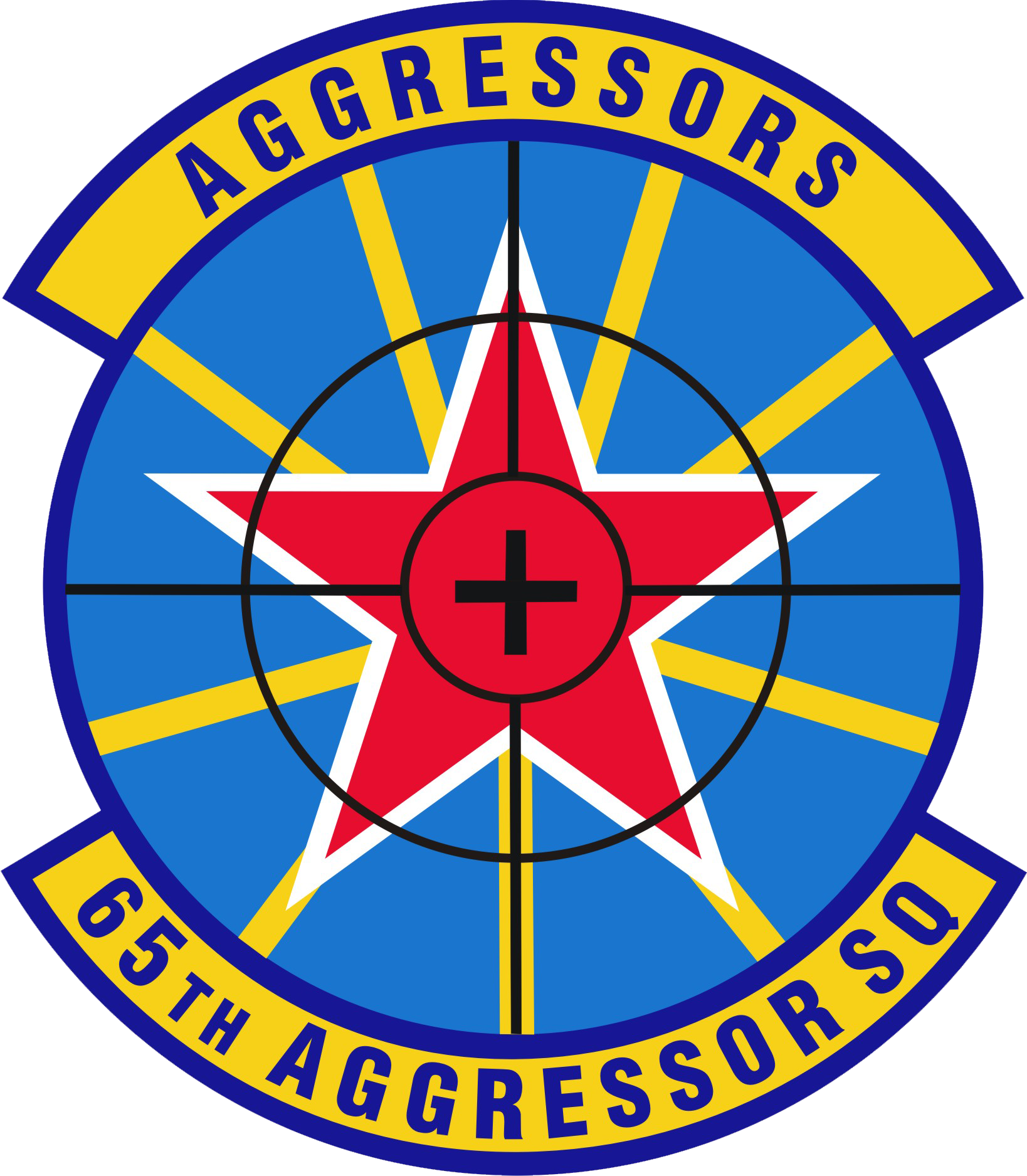
- 65th Aggressor Squadron emblem (approved 14 July 2008)

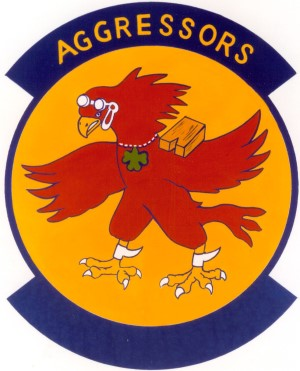
- 65th Aggressor Squadron emblem (approved 16 July 1998)

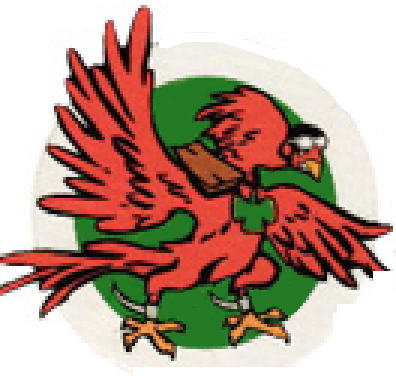
- 65th Pursuit Squadron emblem (approved 18 December 1941)

The 65th Aggressor Squadron is a United States Air Force unit currently operating the F-35A Lightning II. It is assigned to the 57th Operations Group at Nellis Air Force Base, Nevada.

== Overview ==
The 65th Aggressor Squadron currently flies the F-35A, operating as a high-end adversary air to better simulate stealth fighters being inducted in competing nations. As part of the 57th Operations Group, the squadron simulates peer and near-peer stealth threat tactics for Red Flag exercises and provides support for the USAF Weapons School syllabus.

== History ==
=== World War II ===
Formed as a P-40 Warhawk pursuit squadron in January 1941 as part of the Army Air Corps Northeast Defense Sector (later I Fighter Command) at Mitchel Field, New York. Trained in New England and provided air defense of the northeast after the Japanese attack on Pearl Harbor.

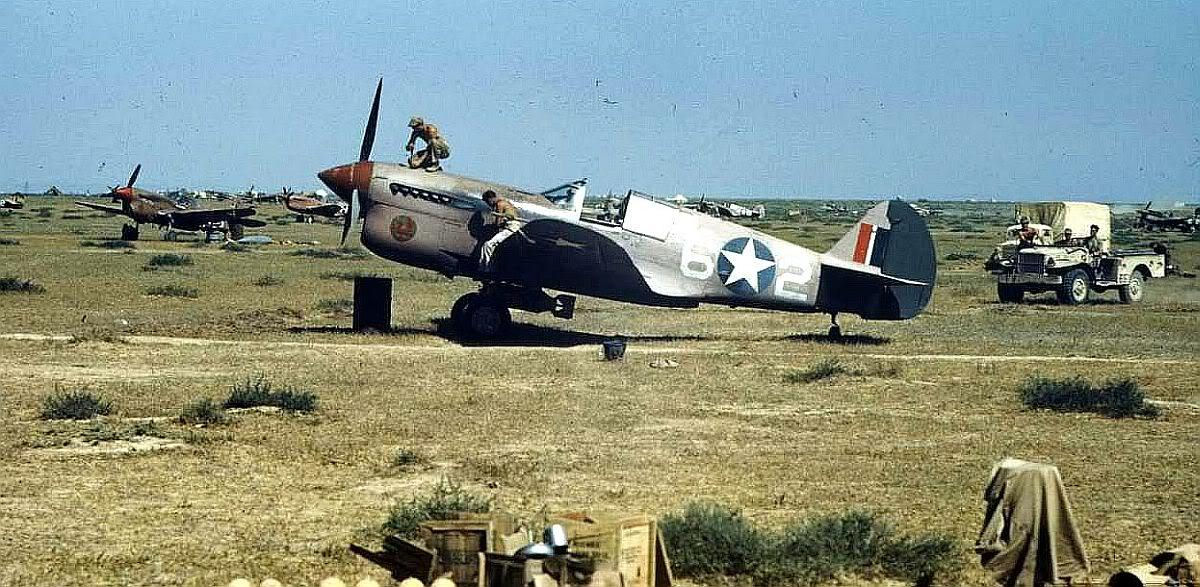
P-40 Warhawk fighters of the 65th Fighter Squadron in North Africa, 1943.

Was reassigned to the U.S. Army Middle East Force in Egypt, July 1942, becoming part of IX Fighter Command. Took part in the British Western Desert campaign, engaged in combat during the Battle of El Alamein and, as part of Ninth Air Force, supported the Commonwealth Eighth Army's drive across Egypt and Libya, escorting bombers and flying strafing and dive-bombing missions against airfields, communications, and troop concentrations until Axis defeat in Tunisia in May 1943. The unit participated in the reduction of Pantelleria (May–June 1943) and the conquest of Sicily (July–August 1943).

The squadron supported the British Eighth Army's landing at Termoli and subsequent operations in Italy, being reassigned to Twelfth Air Force in August 1943. It flew dive-bombing, strafing, patrol, and escort missions.

In 1944, converted to Republic P-47 Thunderbolt aircraft and flew interdiction operations in Italy. They moved to Corsica on 30 March 1944 to operate as a separate task force. It flew interdiction missions against railroads, communication targets, and motor vehicles behind enemy lines, providing a minimum of 48 fighter-bomber sorties per day.

Participated in the French campaign against Elba in June 1944 and in the invasion of Southern France in August. It engaged in interdiction and support operations in northern Italy from September 1944 to May 1945.

The 65th flew its last combat mission on 2 May 1945. Remained in northern Italy after the end of the European War, demobilizing throughout the summer of 1945. It was reassigned to the United States in August 1945 without personnel or equipment and was inactivated at the end of August.

=== Cold War ===
Reactivated in August 1946 as part of Eleventh Air Force (later Alaskan Air Command) as part of the air defense forces in the northwest Pacific. Squadron began training new P-51 pilots at Ladd Field, Alaska. Later, it was equipped with F-80Bs in March–April 1948, F-80Cs in October–December 1948, F-94Bs in the summer of 1951, and F-89Cs in September 1953. With these aircraft, the squadron provided fighter aircraft defense in support of the Alaska Area until late in the 1950s.

In October 1969, the 65th Fighter Weapons Squadron took over the F-100D/F Super Sabre aircraft, personnel, and facilities of the 4536th Fighter Weapons Squadron at Nellis Air Force Base. F-100s tail coded "WB", only to become non-operational early in 1970. On reactivation was equipped with A-7D Corsair II ground attack aircraft, operating from Luke Air Force Base, Arizona, and Davis-Monthan Air Force Base, Arizona. Conducted fighter weapons training with the A-7D until June 1975, when aircraft was sent to Air National Guard units.

=== Aggressor training ===
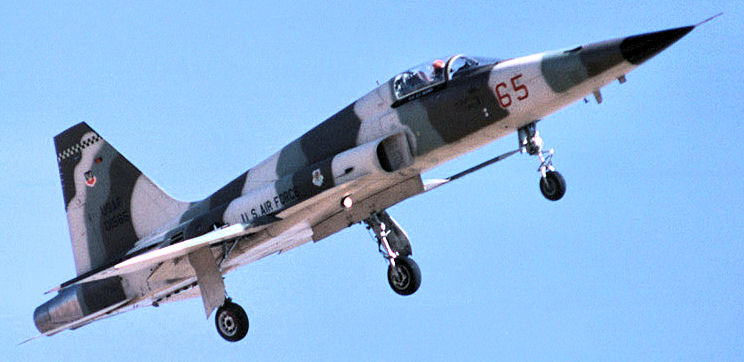
65th Aggressor Squadron F-5E Tiger II "Aggressors" aircraft, about 1980

The squadron was re-equipped in October 1975 with F-5E Tiger IIs, the aircraft having been originally destined for delivery to South Vietnam until that nation collapsed earlier that year and the aircraft subsequently becoming available. Since the F-5E had approximately the size and performance characteristics of a Soviet MiG-21, it was used throughout the US and overseas to teach adversarial tactics and provide dissimilar air combat training to US Air Force flying units, eventually becoming the 65th Aggressor Squadron. The squadron's F-5s carried no tail codes, although they did carry the Nellis black/yellow checkertail stripe and a Tactical Air Command emblem on the tail. The aircraft were painted in Soviet Air Forces motif with subdued USAF markings, with the last two digits of the F-5's tail number painted in the then-Soviet style in red on the front fuselage, highlighted in white.

Deployed throughout US and overseas to teach adversarial tactics and provide dissimilar air combat training to US Air Force flying units. Re-designated 65th Tactical Fighter Aggressor Squadron on 30 December 1981. Added subdued "WA" tail code in early 1987. Redesignated again as 64th Aggressor Squadron on 4 January 1983.

Operated until 1989 when the F-5s began having structural problems with the airframes. As the Cold War ended and military budgets adjusted, the unit flew their last aggressor flight in the F-5 on 7 April 1989.

=== Return to aggressor training ===
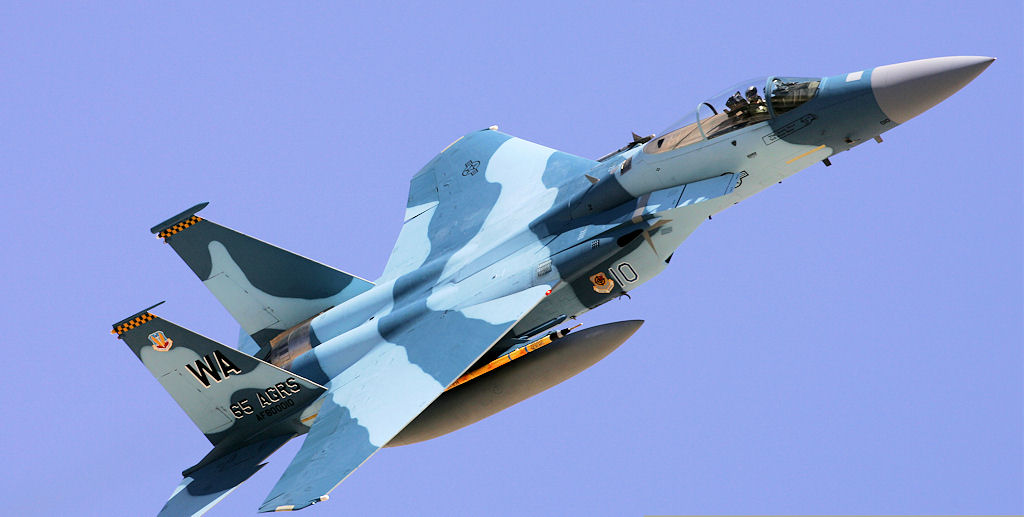
F-15C Eagle 80-0010 of the 65th Aggressor Squadron in 2008

The squadron was reactivated in September 2005, flying F-15Cs and F-15Ds as the 65th Aggressor Squadron with 24 aircraft assigned. The aircraft were painted in camouflage schemes identical to those observed on Russian-manufactured Sukhoi Su-27 fighters and operated in conjunction with the 64th Aggressor Squadron, which performs a similar task using F-16 Fighting Falcons. The 65th annually participated in the USAF Red Flag and Canadian Forces Maple Flag exercises, provided USAF Weapons School syllabus support, priority test mission support, and "road shows" that visited various units throughout the US to support Air Combat Command (ACC) and ACC-gained Air Force Reserve Command and Air National Guard units for training.

On 30 July 2008, one pilot was killed and another injured when their F-15 crashed into the ground during a training mission.

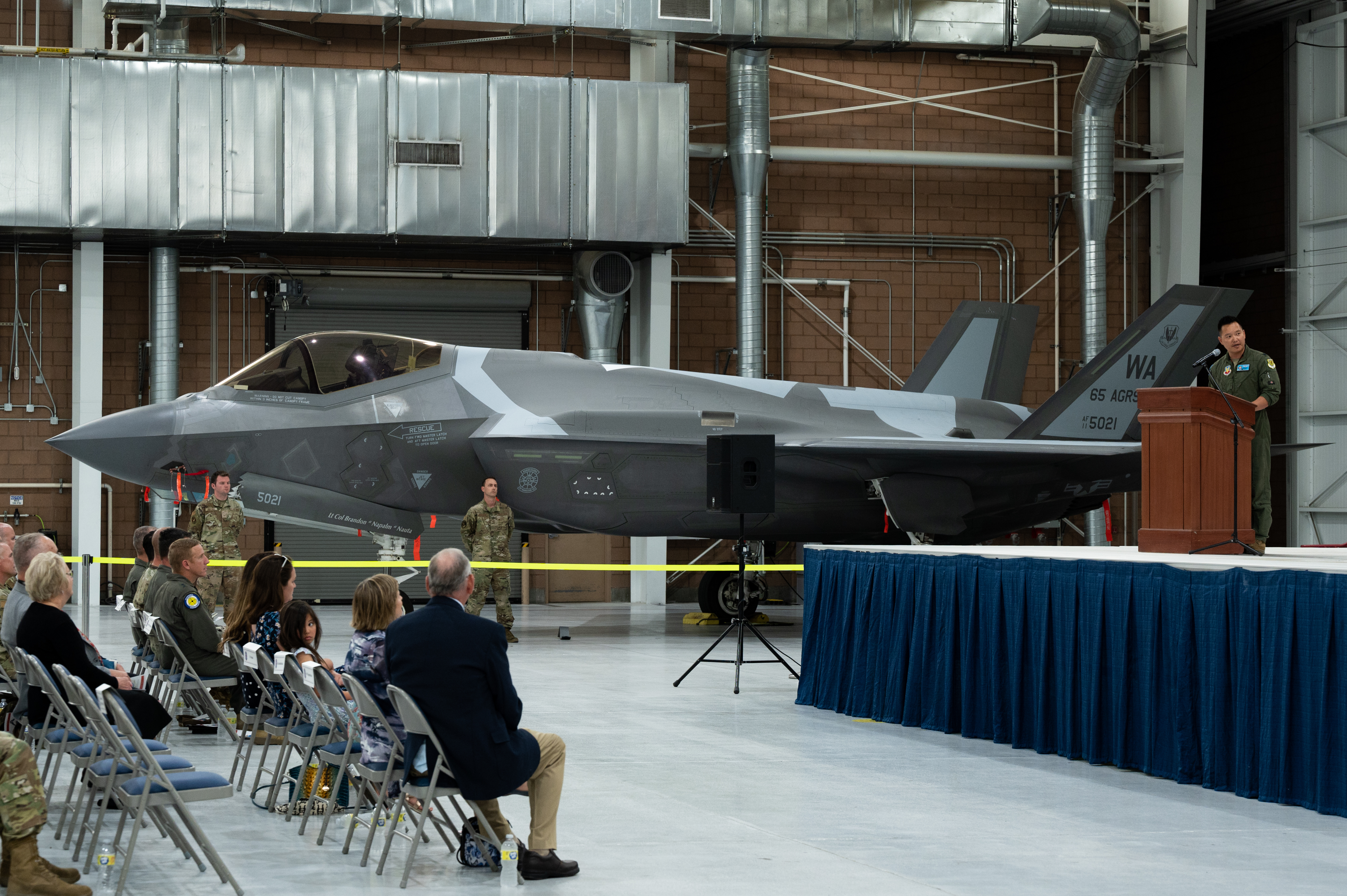
F-35 Lightning II 11-5021 at the squadron's reactivation ceremony in 2022

The Air Force inactivated the unit on 26 September 2014 due to Fiscal Year 2015 budget constraints imposed upon the Air Force that zero-lined the squadron's budget. Its fleet was maintained by Flanker Aircraft Maintenance Unit, a section of the 757th Aircraft Maintenance Squadron. On 9 May 2019 US Air Force announced it planned to reactivate the 65th Aggressor Squadron with new aircraft, F-35A Lightning II. The squadron was formally reactivated on 9 June 2022. Nellis Air Force Base planned to further upgrade its fleet with more F-35s and F-22s to replicate adversaries' capabilities, specifically the Chinese fifth-generation fighters.

== Lineage ==
- Constituted as the 65th Pursuit Squadron (Interceptor) on 20 November 1940

Activated on 15 January 1941
Redesignated 65th Fighter Squadron on 15 May 1942
Inactivated on 7 November 1945

- Activated on 15 August 1946

Redesignated 65th Fighter-Interceptor Squadron on 20 January 1950
Inactivated on 8 January 1958

- Redesignated 65th Fighter Weapons Squadron on 22 August 1969

Activated on 15 October 1969
Redesignated: 65th Tactical Fighter Training Aggressor Squadron on 30 December 1981
Redesignated: 65th Aggressor Squadron on 1 April 1983
Inactivated on 7 April 1989

- Activated on 15 September 2005
- Inactivated on 26 September 2014
- Reactivated on 9 June 2022

=== Assignments ===
- 57th Pursuit Group (later 57th Fighter Group), 15 January 1941 - 7 November 1945
- 57th Fighter Group (later Fighter-Interceptor Group), 15 August 1946
- 10th Air Division, 13 April 1953
- 328th Fighter Group, 1 November 1957 - 8 January 1958
- 57th Fighter Weapons Wing (later 57th Tactical Training Wing, 57th Fighter Weapons Wing), 15 October 1969 - 7 April 1989
- 57th Adversary Tactics Group, 15 September 2005 – 26 September 2014
- 57th Operations Group, 9 June 2022 - present

=== Stations ===
- Mitchel Field, New York, 15 January 1941
- Bradley Field, Connecticut, 19 August 1941
- Trumbull Field, Connecticut, 13 December 1941
- Rentschler Field, Connecticut, 24 June-5 July 1942
- Cairo, Egypt, 9 August 1942
- Cyprus, 15 August 1942
- Landing Ground 174, Egypt, 16 September 1942
- Landing Ground 172, Egypt, 6 November 1942
- Landing Ground 75, Egypt, 9 November 1942
- Martuba Airfield, Libya, 12 November 1942
- Belandah Airfield, Libya, 11 December 1942
- Hamraiet Airfield, Libya, 12 January 1943
- Zuara Airfield, Libya, February 1943
- Ben Gardane Airfield, Tunisia, 10 March 1943
- Soltane Airfield, Tunisia, 21 March 1943
- Hani Airfield, Tunisia, April 1943
- Cape Bon Airfield, Tunisia, c. 6 June 1943
- Takali Airfield, Malta, 13 July 1943
- Pachino Airfield, Sicily, Italy, 19 July 1943
- Scordia Airfield, Sicily, Italy, 30 July 1943
- Rocca Bernardo Airfield, Italy, 18 September 1943
- Rocca Bernardo Airfield, Italy, 25 September 1943
- Foggia Airfield, Italy, 2 October 1943
- Amendola Airfield, Italy, 28 October 1943
- Cercola Airfield, Italy, 1 March 1944
- Alto Airfield, Corsica, France, 28 March 1944
- Grosseto Airfield, Italy, 11 September 1944
- Villafranca di Verona Airfield, Italy, 29 April 1945
- Grosseto Airfield, Italy, 7 May 1945
- Bagnoli Airfield, Italy, 15 July − 5 August 1945
- Drew Field, Florida, 22 August - 7 November 1945
- Ladd Field, Alaska, 15 August 1946
- Mile 26 Field, Alaska, 20 September 1946
- Elmendorf Field, Alaska Territory, 23 June 1947
- Richards-Gebaur Air Force Base, Missouri, 1 November 1957 - 8 January 1958
- Nellis Air Force Base, Nevada, 15 October 1969 - 7 April 1989
- Nellis Air Force Base, Nevada, 15 September 2005 - 26 September 2014, 9 June 2022 - present

=== Aircraft ===
- Curtiss P-40 Warhawk, 1941–1943
- Republic P-47 Thunderbolt, 1943–1945
- Beechcraft C-45 Expeditor, 1946–1947
- North American P-51 Mustang, 1946–1948
- Lockheed F-80 Shooting Star, 1948–1951
- Douglas C-47 Skytrain, 1948
- North American AT-6 Texan (later T-6), 1946, 1948
- Douglas B-26 Invader, 1949
- Lockheed T-33 T-Bird, 1949–1956
- Lockheed F-94 Starfire, 1951–1954
- Northrop F-89 Scorpion, 1953–1957
- North American F-100 Super Sabre, 1969
- LTV A-7D Corsair II, 1972–1975
- Northrop F-5E Tiger II, 1975–1989
- McDonnell F-15C Eagle, 2005–2014
- Lockheed Martin F-35A Lightning II, 2022–present
