= 66th Weapons Squadron =

66th Weapons Squadron

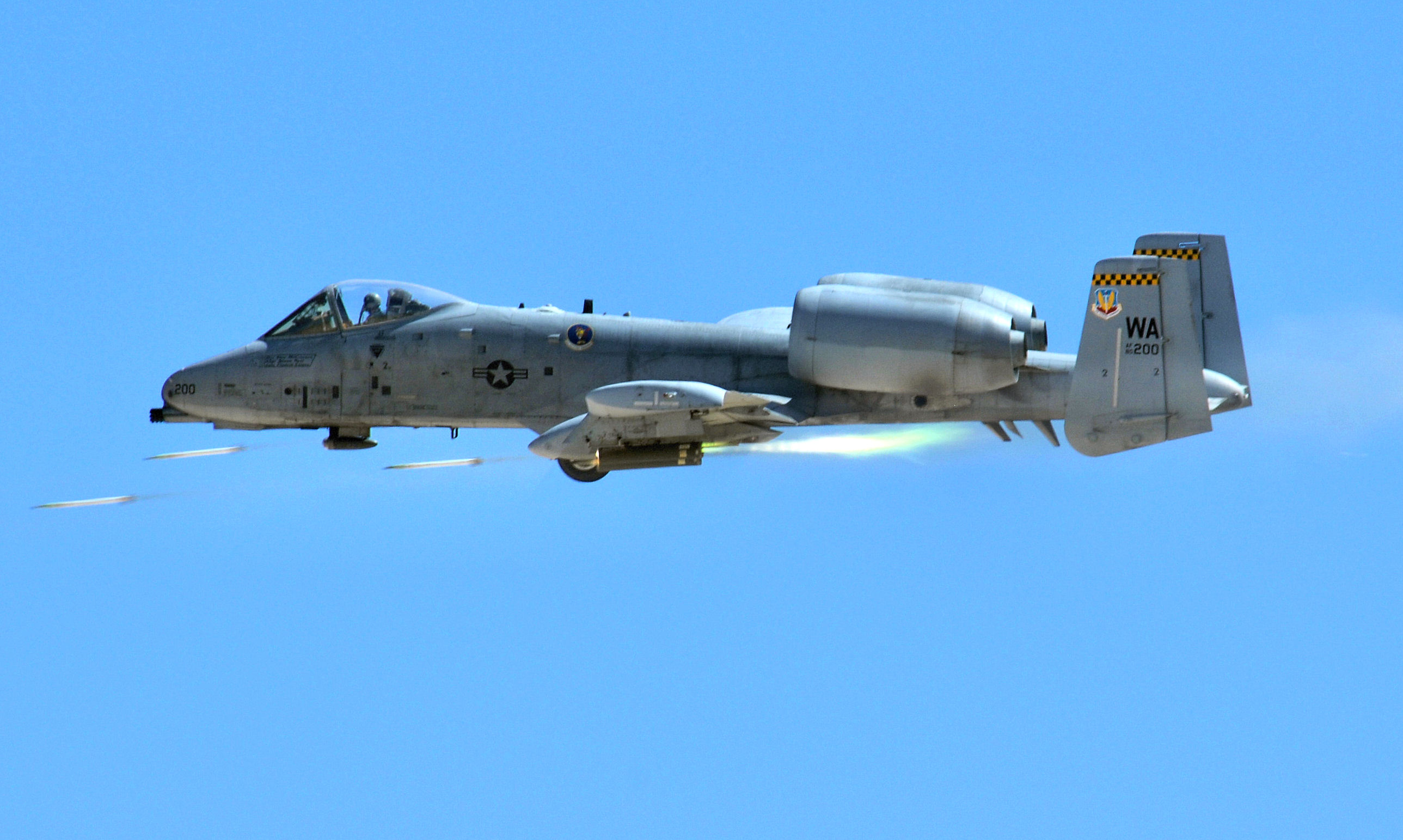
- 66th Weapons Squadron A-10A Thunderbolt II
- Active: 1941–1945; 1946–1958; 1969–1981; 2003–present
- Country: United States
- Branch: United States Air Force
- Role: Advanced Special Warfare Training
- Part of: Air Combat Command
- Garrison/HQ: Nellis Air Force Base, Nevada
- Nickname: Wild Weasel (1969-1981)
- Engagements: Mediterranean Theater of Operations

- Decorations: Distinguished Unit Citation (3x) Air Force Outstanding Unit Award French Croix de Guerre, with Palm

Insignia
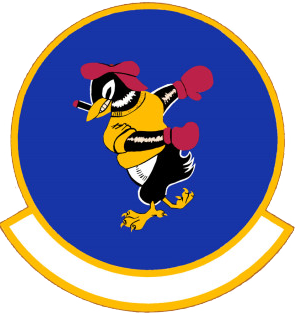
- 66th Weapons Squadron emblem (reinstated and modified 18 January 1978)

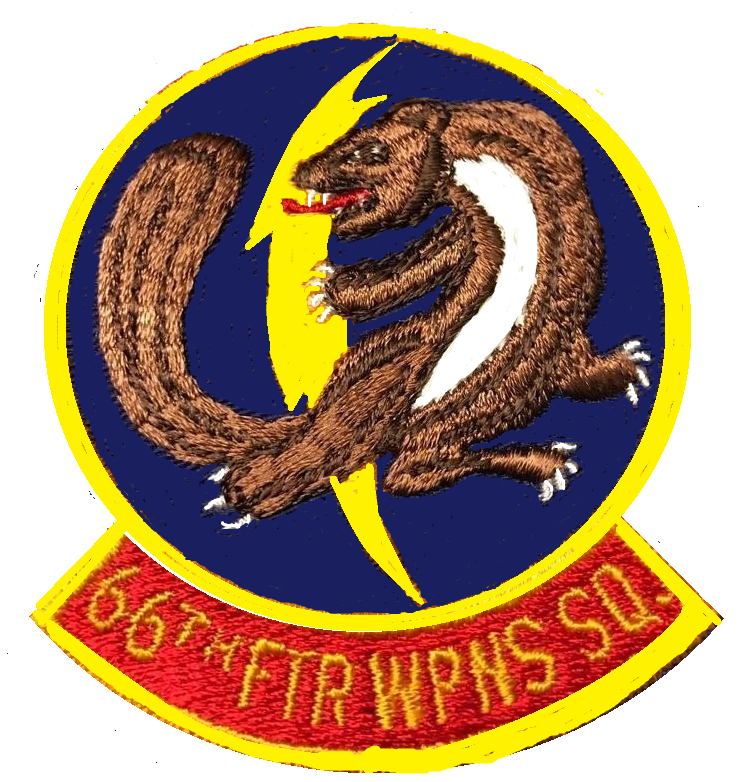
- 66th Fighter Weapons Squadron emblem (approved 20 March 1970)

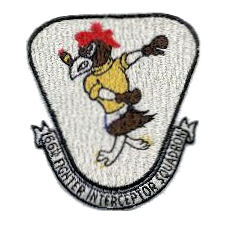
- Patch with 66th Fighter Squadron emblem (approved 2 January 1942)
- Tail Code: WA

The United States Air Force's 66th Weapons Squadron is a United States Air Force Weapons School Air Force Special Warfare training unit, at Nellis Air Force Base, Nevada.

The squadron was first activated in the build up of the American military prior to its entry into World War II as the 66th Pursuit Squadron. After training in the United States, it deployed to North Africa in 1942, and participated in combat in the Mediterranean Theater of Operations. The squadron moved forward through Egypt, Libya, and Tunisia with Allied forces, moving to Italy in 1943. The 66th earned three Distinguished Unit Citations for its combat actions before returning to the United States for inactivation in 1945.

The following year, the squadron was activated for the air defense of Alaska. It served in this role, and briefly in the air defense of California, before inactivating in 1958. It was reactivated in 1969 as the 66th Fighter Weapons Squadron, an advanced training unit for Wild Weasel tactics until inactivating in 1981.

== Overview ==
Active since 2003, the 66th Weapons Squadron teaches graduate-level instructor courses that provide training in weapons and tactics employment to officers of the combat air forces and mobility air forces. The 66th focuses on the A-10 Thunderbolt II, with the climax of the course being the mission employment phase, a two-week staged battle over the Nevada Test and Training Range.

Upon graduation, the new weapons officers return to the field to serve as unit weapons and tactics officers, providing advanced instruction and technical advice to their commanders, operations officers, and personnel.

== History ==
=== World War II ===
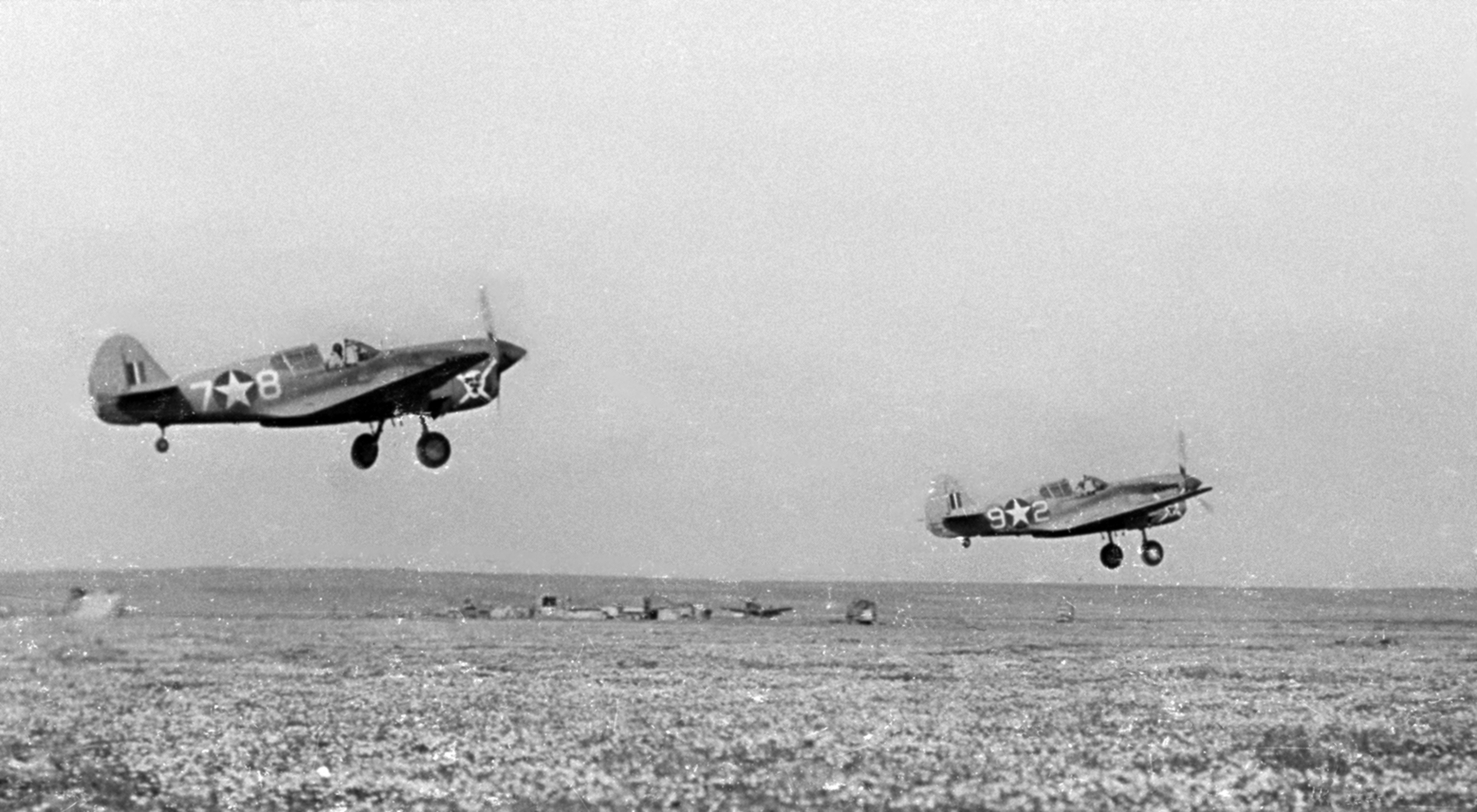
66th FS P-40Fs take off in North Africa, c. 1942.

Formed as a P-40 Warhawk pursuit squadron in January 1941 as part of the Army Air Corps Northeast Defense Sector (later I Fighter Command) at Mitchel Field, New York. Trained in New England and provided air defense of the northeast after the Japanese attack on Pearl Harbor.

Was reassigned to the U.S. Army Middle East Force in Egypt, July 1942, becoming part of IX Fighter Command. Took part in the British Western Desert campaign, engaged in combat during the Battle of El Alamein and, as part of Ninth Air Force, supported the Commonwealth Eighth Army's drive across Egypt and Libya, escorting bombers and flying strafing and dive-bombing missions against airfields, communications, and troop concentrations until Axis defeat in Tunisia in May 1943. The unit participated in the reduction of Pantelleria (May–June 1943) and the conquest of Sicily (July–August 1943).

The squadron supported the British Eighth Army's landing at Termoli and subsequent operations in Italy, being reassigned to Twelfth Air Force in August 1943. It flew dive-bombing, strafing, patrol, and escort missions.

In 1944, converted to P-47 Thunderbolt aircraft and flew interdiction operations in Italy. They moved to Corsica on 30 March 1944 to operate as a separate task force. It flew interdiction missions against railroads, communication targets, and motor vehicles behind enemy lines, providing a minimum of 48 fighter-bomber sorties per day.

Participated in the French campaign against Elba in June 1944 and in the invasion of Southern France in August. It engaged in interdiction and support operations in northern Italy from September 1944 to May 1945.

The 66th flew its last combat mission on 2 May 1945. Remained in northern Italy after the end of the European War, demobilizing throughout the summer of 1945. It was reassigned to the United States in August 1945 without personnel or equipment and was inactivated at the end of August.

=== Cold War ===
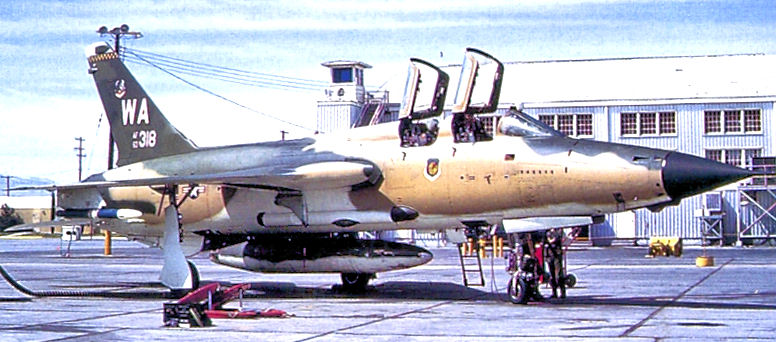
66th FWS F-105F Thunderchief, AF Ser. No. 63-8318

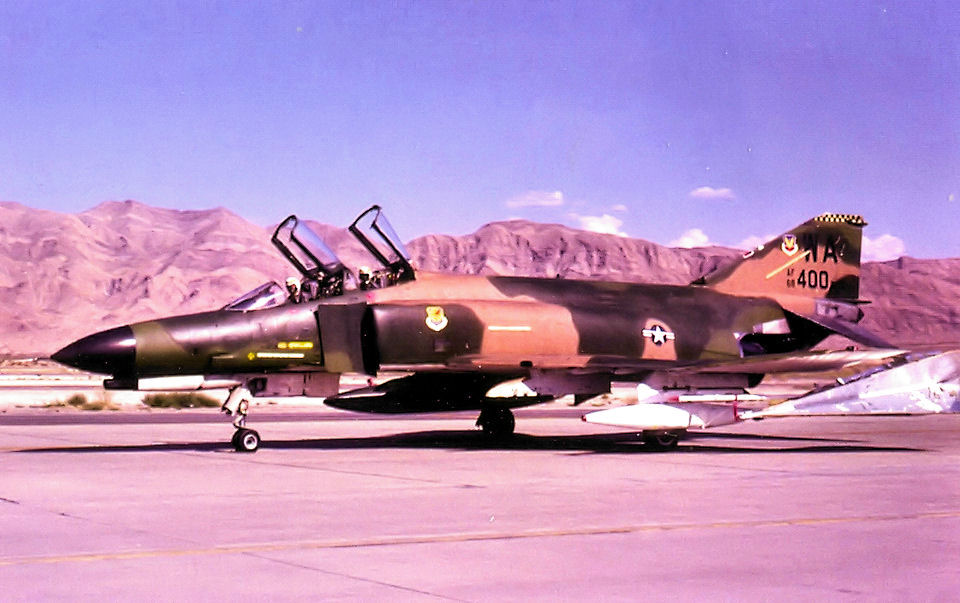
66th FWS F-4E Phantom II, AF Ser. No. 68-0400

Reactivated in August 1946 as part of Eleventh Air Force (Later Alaskan Air Command) as part of the air defense forces in the northwest Pacific. Squadron began training new P-51 pilots at Elmendorf Field, Alaska. Later, it was equipped with F-80Bs in March–April 1948, F-80Cs in October–December 1948, F-94Bs in the summer of 1951, and F-89Cs in September 1953. With these aircraft, the squadron provided fighter aircraft defense in support of the Alaska Area until late in the 1950s.

Was reassigned to Oxnard AFB, California in 1957, but was never equipped or manned due to budgetary constraints, inactivated by Air Defense command, January 1958.

Reactivated by Tactical Air Command at Nellis AFB, Nevada in October 1969 Assumed the F-105C/D Thunderchief assets of the provisional 4537th Fighter Weapons Squadron, tail coded "WC". Mission was to perform "Wild Weasel" training for USAF pilots and electronic warfare officers to be deployed to combat missions in Southeast Asia. Squadron aircraft carried tail code "WA" by October 1971, black/yellow checkered tail stripes. Squadron also assumed F-4C Phantom II assets, tail coded "WD" until October 1971, then changed to same "WA" as the F-105s. Trained with the F-4s and F-105s until July 1975 when Wild Weasel training and aircraft reassigned to George AFB, California.

Remained in non-operational status until October 1977 when reorganized as an A-10 Squadron, tail coded "WA", black/yellow checkered tail stripes. Performed fighter weapons training with the A-10 until the end of 1981, when inactivated and squadron was reassigned to the USAF Fighter Weapons School, being re-designated as "A-10 Division".

=== Modern era ===
Reactivated in February 2003 as 66th Weapons Squadron (66 WPS), replacing USAF Weapons School A-10 division. Provides USAF Weapons School syllabus support, priority test mission support and road shows that visit various units throughout the CONUS to ACC units for training.

== Lineage ==
- Constituted as the 66th Pursuit Squadron (Interceptor) on 20 November 1940

Activated on 15 January 1941
Redesignated 66th Pursuit Squadron (Interceptor) (Twin Engine) on 31 January 1942
Redesignated 66th Fighter Squadron (Twin Engine) on 15 May 1942
Redesignated 66th Fighter Squadron on 1 June 1942
Redesignated 66th Fighter Squadron, Single Engine' on 21 August 1944
Inactivated on 7 November 1945

- Activated on 15 August 1946

Redesignated 66th Fighter Squadron, Jet on 20 July 1948
Redesignated 66th Fighter-Interceptor Squadron on 20 January 1950
Inactivated on 8 January 1958

- Redesignated 66th Fighter Weapons Squadron on 22 August 1969

Activated on 15 October 1969
Inactivated on 30 Dec 1981

- Redesignated 66th Weapons Squadron on 24 January 2003

Activated and organized on 3 February 2003

=== Assignments ===
- 57th Pursuit Group (later 57th Fighter Group), 15 January 1941 – 7 November 1945
- 57th Fighter Group (later 57th Fighter-Interceptor Group), 15 August 1946
- 10th Air Division, 13 April 1953
- 414th Fighter Group, 1 December 1957 – 8 January 1958
- 57th Fighter Weapons Wing (later 57th Tactical Training Wing, 57th Fighter Weapons Wing), 15 October 1969 – 30 December 1981
- USAF Weapons School, 3 February 2003 – present

=== Stations ===
- Mitchel Field, New York, 15 January 1941
- Bradley Field, Connecticut, 18 August 1941
- Farmingdale Army Air Field, New York, 14 December 1941
- Quonset Point Naval Air Station, Rhode Island, 27 February 1942
- Hillsgrove Army Air Field, Rhode Island, 8 June – 5 July 1942
- RAF Beit Daras 31°44′12″N 034°41′54″E, Palestine, 19 August 1942
- Egypt, 16 September 1942
- RAF Gambut, Libya, 13 November 1942
- El Gazala Airfield, Libya, 15 November 1942
- Belandah Airfield, Libya, 11 December 1942
- Hamraiet Airfield, Libya, 12 January 1943
- Darragh Airfield, Libya, 18 January 1943
- Zuara Airfield, Libya, 24 February 1943
- Nefatia Airfield, Tunisia, 5 March 1943
- Ben Gardane Airfield, Tunisia, 7 March 1943
- Soltane Airfield, Tunisia, 20 March 1943
- Medenine Airfield, Tunisia, 4 April 1943
- Chekira Airfield, Tunisia, 11 April 1943
- El Djem Airfield, Tunisia, 14 April 1943
- El Hani Airfield, Tunisia, 21 April 1943
- Bou Grara Airfield, Tunisia, 20 May 1943
- Takali Airfield, Malta, 27 June 1943
- Pachino Airfield, Sicily, Italy, 19 July 1943
- Scordia Airfield, Sicily, Italy, 30 July 1943
- Gioia del Colle, Italy, c. 25 September 1943
- Foggia Airfield, Italy, c. 1 October 1943
- Amendola Airfield, Italy, 27 October 1943
- Cercola Airfield, Italy, c. 1 March 1944
- Alto Airfield, Corsica, 28 March 1944
- Ombrone Airfield, Italy, 11 September 1944
- Grosseto Airfield, Italy, 25 September 1944
- Villafranca di Verona Airfield, Italy, 29 April 1945
- Grosseto Airfield, Italy, 8 May 1945
- Bagnoli Airfield, Italy, 15 July – 5 August 1945
- Drew Field, Florida, 23 August – 7 November 1945
- Shemya Army Air Field, Aleutian Islands, 15 August 1946
- Elmendorf Field (later Elmendorf Air Force Base), Alaska, c. 30 May 1947 – 1 December 1957
- Oxnard Air Force Base, California, 1 December 1957 – 8 January 1958
- Nellis Air Force Base, Nevada, 15 October 1969 – 30 December 1981
- Nellis Air Force Base, Nevada, 3 February 2003 – present

 

=== Aircraft ===
- Curtiss P-40 Warhawk, 1941–1944
- Republic P-47 Thunderbolt, 1944–1945
- Lockheed P-38 Lightning, 1946
- North American P-51 Mustang, 1946–1948
- Lockheed F-80 Shooting Star, 1948–1951
- Lockheed F-94 Starfire, 1951–1953
- Northrop F-89 Scorpion, 1953–1957
- Republic F-105 Thunderchief, 1969–1975
- McDonnell F-4 Phantom II, c. 1971-1975
- Fairchild A-10 Thunderbolt II, 1977–1981, 2003 – present
