= 414th Combat Training Squadron =

414th Combat Training Squadron

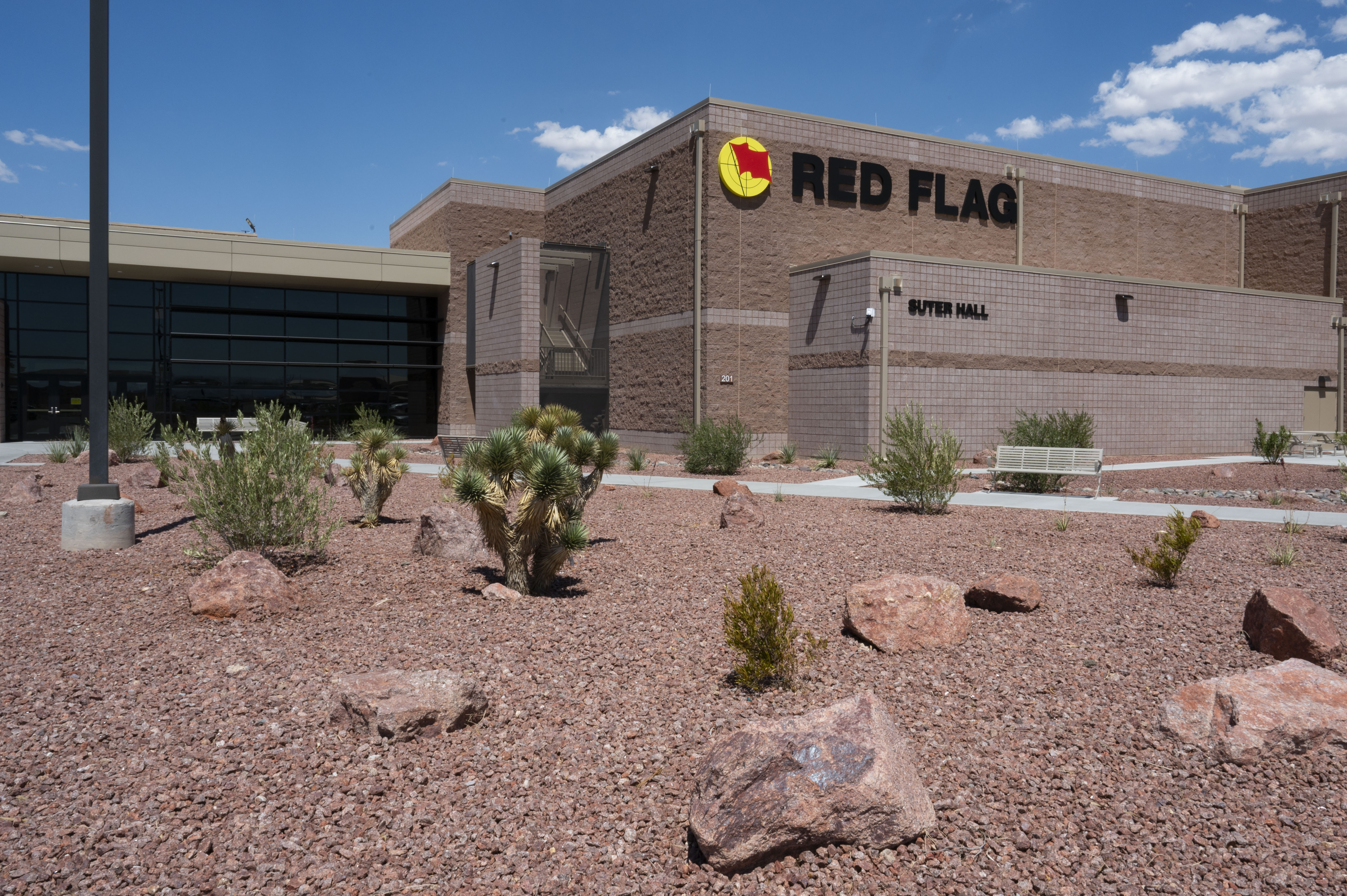
- The building at Nellis AFB where the squadron hosts Red Flag exercises, 2023
- Active: 1943–1947; 1969–1981; 1991–present
- Country: United States
- Branch: United States Air Force
- Role: Combat Training Unit
- Part of: Air Combat Command: United States Air Force Warfare Center; 57th Wing; 57th Operations Group
- Garrison/HQ: Nellis Air Force Base, Nevada
- Engagements: World War II – EAME Theater

- Decorations: Distinguished Unit Citation Air Force Outstanding Unit Award (7x)

Insignia
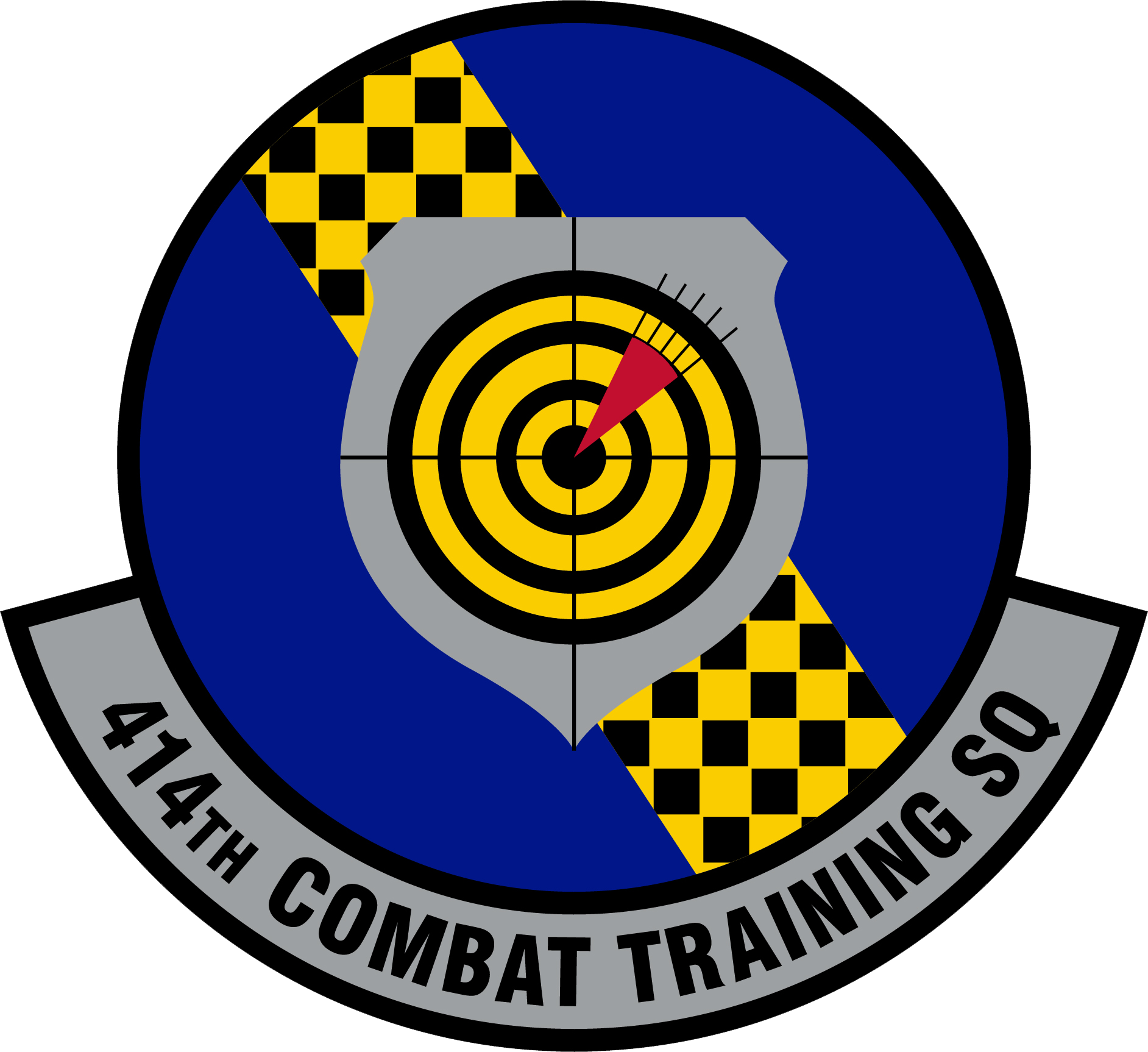
- 414th Combat Training Squadron emblem (approved 22 October 1980)

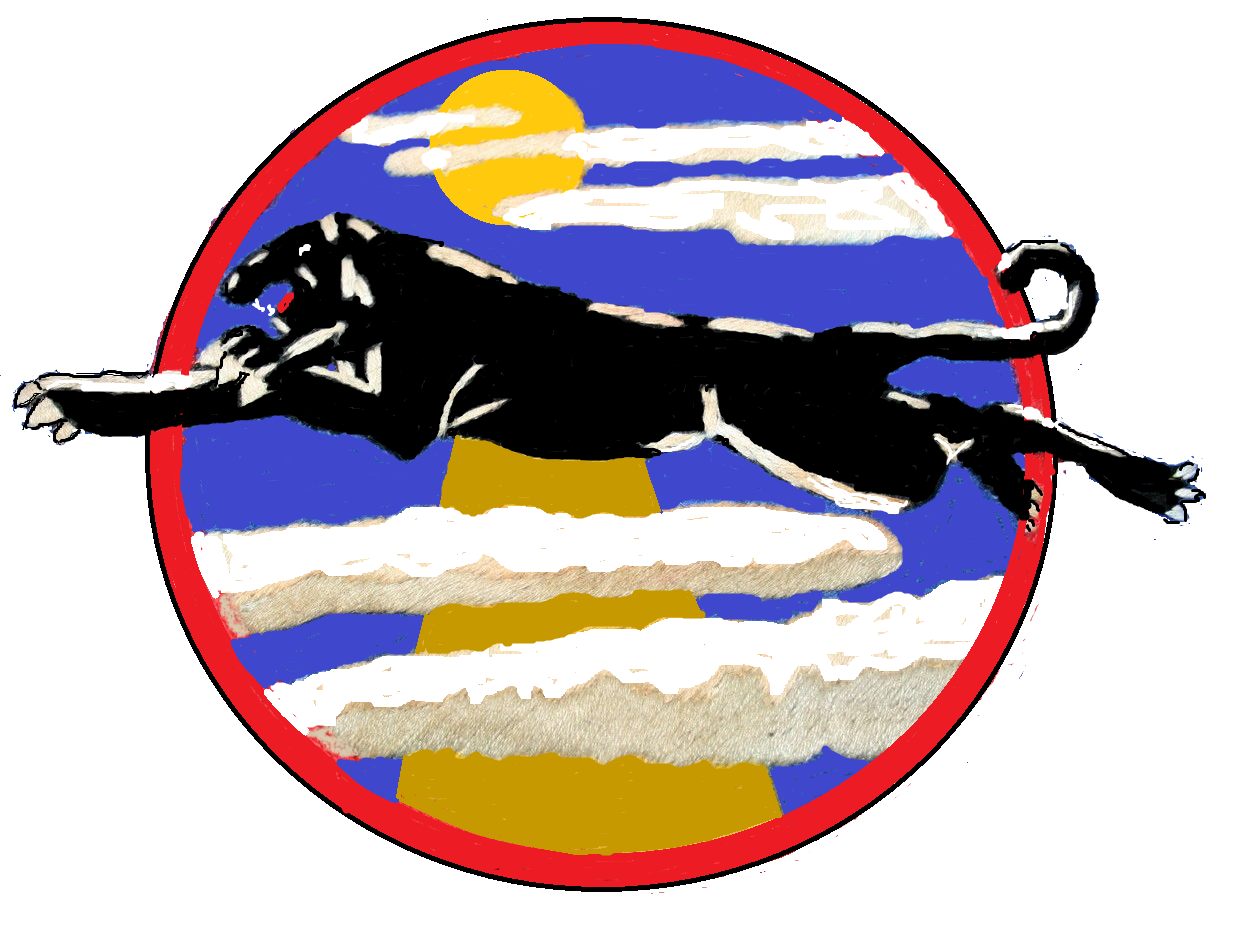
- 414th Night Fighter Squadron emblem

The 414th Combat Training Squadron (414 CTS) is a United States Air Force unit assigned to the 57th Wing, 57th Operations Group at Nellis Air Force Base, Nevada. The 414th is a non-flying organization charged with hosting Red Flag exercises, Air Combat Command's largest Large Force Exercise (LFE).

The unit was originally formed as the 414th Night Fighter Squadron in 1943. After training, it was deployed to Twelfth Air Force during the North African Campaign to provide air defense interceptor protection against Luftwaffe night air raids. It later operated in Sardinia, Corsica, Italy, plus a detachment served in Belgium during the Battle of the Bulge. It returned to the United States and was inactivated in 1947.

It was reactivated as the 414th Fighter Weapons Squadron at Nellis in 1969, serving in that role until inactivated in 1983. It was activated again at Nellis in 1991 as the 414th composite Training Squadron. In 2005, it became a non-flying squadron managing Red Flag exercises.

== Mission ==
Red Flag is a realistic combat training exercise involving the air forces of the United States and its allies. It is conducted on the bombing and gunnery ranges near Nellis Air Force Base, Nevada. It is one of a series of advanced training programs administered by the Air Warfare Center and Nellis.

The 414th coordinates the General Dynamics F-16 Fighting Falcons flown by the 64th Aggressor Squadron and the ground-based air defenses operated by the 507th Air Defense Aggressor Squadron.

== History ==
=== World War II ===
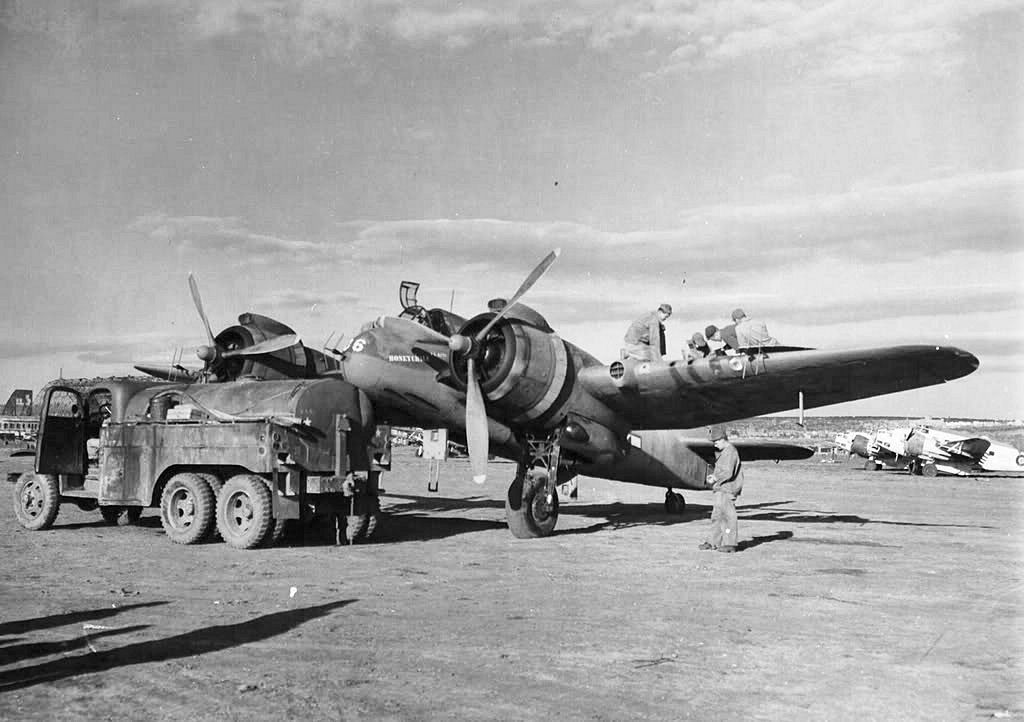
414th Night Fighter Squadron Bristol Beaufighter at a base in Tunisia, 1943

Established as the 414th Night Fighter Squadron in January 1943, trained in Florida with a specialized version of the Douglas A-20 Havoc modified for night combat.

Deployed to Twelfth Air Force in Algeria, May 1943. Equipped with British Bristol Beaufighter, carried out defensive night patrols over Allied-held territory during the North African campaign, also conducted night interdiction raids on German positions in Algeria and Tunisia. After German collapse in North Africa, continued defensive patrols and offensive night attacks on Axis positions on Sardinia, Corsica, and in Italy. Detachment operated with Ninth Air Force in Belgium in late 1944–1945 during the Battle of the Bulge. Re-equipped with P-38Ms (modified Lockheed P-38J Lightnings) for night operations. Fitted with an AN/APS-6 radar in an external radome underneath the nose, relocated radio equipment and anti-flash gun muzzles in early 1945.

=== Foo fighter incidents ===
When flying the Northrop P-61 Black Widow out of (what is now) Pontedera Airport, various crews saw foo fighter objects over Bologna on February 27 1945. The 416th Night Fighter Squadron, at Pisa, had also seen 'foo fighter' objects a week before.

=== Post war ===
The squadron stood down after the end of the European War, May 1945. Designated as not operational, June 1945 – August 1946. Moved on paper to Shaw Field, South Carolina, 15 August 1946 and equipped with returned Northrop P-61 Black Widow night fighters. Squadron was inactivated 16 March 1947, with aircraft being reassigned to the 319th Fighter Squadron (All Weather) and flown to Howard Field, Canal Zone, 1947 for defense of Panama Canal.

=== Cold War ===
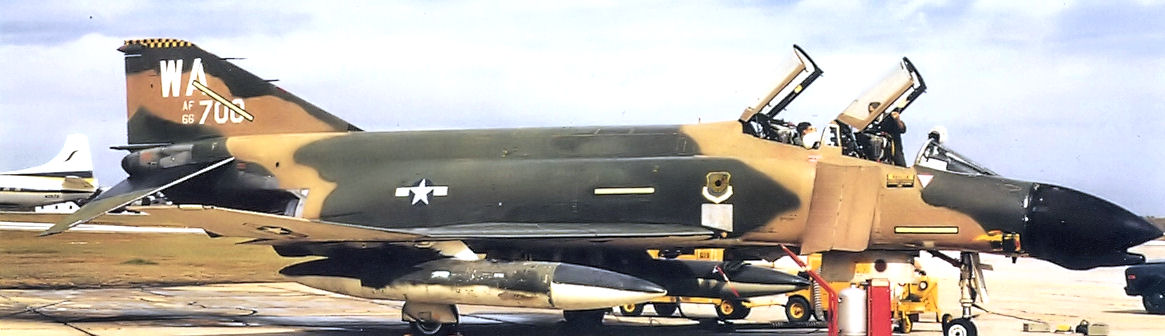
414th FWS F-4D Phantom, AF Ser. No. 66-8700, November 1972

Redesignated as the 414th Fighter Weapons Squadron on 22 August 1969, the squadron reactivated on 15 October 1969 at Nellis Air Force Base, Nevada, replacing the 4538th Combat Crew Training Squadron. Assigned to the 57th Fighter Weapons Wing, the 414th was tasked with combat crew training, using the McDonnell F-4C Phantom II aircraft. Aircraft initially tail coded "WD", wing tail code "WA" was adopted in October 1971. upgrading to the F-4D and last, the F-4E, tail coded "WA" with black/yellow check tail stripe.

The 414th assumed the duties of the 4440th Tactical Fighter Training Group (Red Flag) on 1 March 1976, performing combat fighter weapons training with the F-4 until the end of 1981, when inactivated and squadron replaced by the F-4 Division of the USAF Fighter Weapons School.

=== Modern era ===
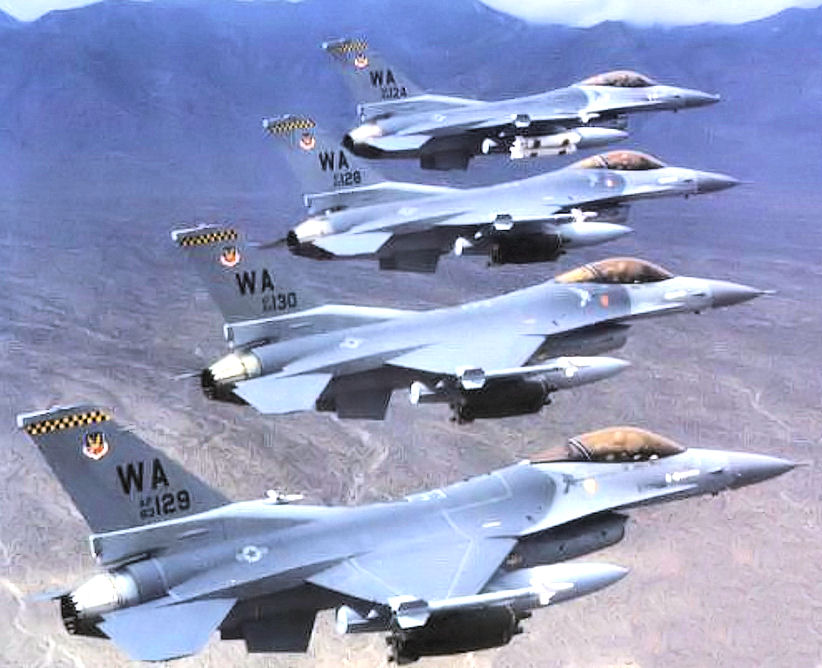
Four F-16 Fighting Falcons of the 414th Composite Training Squadron, 1992

The squadron was redesignated as the 414th Composite Training Squadron and activated, on 1 November 1991, at Nellis. Assigned to the 57th Operations Group, and flying the F-16, the squadron was tasked with conducting Red Flag exercises. In 1993, the unit was renamed the 414th Training Squadron, and in 1994, the 414th Combat Training Squadron. Performed aggressor training with F-16C Fighting Falcons until 2005 when they were reassigned to the 64th Aggressor Squadron, 57th Adversary Tactics Group.

Now a non-flying organization, the 414th, unlike most USAF squadrons which are typically commanded by lieutenant colonels, the present scope of responsibility of the squadron within the United States Air Force Warfare Center (USAFWC) is such that it is now commanded by a full colonel. While the 414th remains technically subordinate to the 57th Operations Group, it is now more analogous to group level-equivalent organization for administration of Red Flag operations.

== Lineage ==
- Constituted as the 414th Night Fighter Squadron on 21 January 1943

Activated on 26 January 1943
Inactivated on 1 September 1947

- Redesignated 414th Fighter Weapons Squadron on 22 August 1969

Activated on 15 October 1969
Inactivated on 30 December 1983

- Redesignated 414th Composite Training Squadron and activated on 1 November 1991

Redesignated 414th Training Squadron on 15 January 1993
Redesignated 414th Combat Training Squadron on 1 July 1994

=== Assignments ===
- Army Air Force School of Applied Tactics, 26 January 1943 (air echelon attached to VIII Fighter Command after 31 March 1943)
- Twelfth Air Force, 10 May 1943 (Attached to Northwest African Coastal Air Force, 11–29 May 1943, air echelon remained attached to VIII Fighter Command)

2d Air Defense Wing (later 63d Fighter Wing), 29 May 1943 (air echelon remained attached to VIII Fighter Command until 2 July 1943)
62d Fighter Wing, 21 September 1944 (detachment attached to 422d Night Fighter Squadron, 27 January 27 – 23 April 1945)
XXII Tactical Air Command, 1 April 1945

- Twelfth Air Force, 7 June 1945 (not operational)
- Fourth Air Force, 26 August 1945
- Air Defense Command, 21 March 1946
- Tactical Air Command, 31 July 1946
- Third Air Force, 1 October 1946
- Ninth Air Force, 1 November 1946
- 6th Fighter Wing, 24 March–1 September 1947
- 57th Fighter Weapons Wing (later 57th Tactical Training Wing, 57th Fighter Weapons Wing), 15 October 1969 – 30 December 1981
- 57th Operations Group, 1 November 1991 – present

=== Stations ===
- Orlando Army Air Base, Florida, 26 January 1943
- Kissimmee Army Air Field, Florida, 8 February–21 April 1943 (air echelon in England after 31 March 1943)
- La Senia Airfield, Oran, Algeria, 10 May 1943 (air echelon in England)
- Rerhaia Airfield, Algeria, c. 11 June 1943 (air echelon in England until 16 July 1943, detachment operated from: Protville Airfield, Tunisia, 23–29 July 1943)
- Elmas Airfield, Sardinia, Italy, c. 11 November 1943

Detachment operated from Ghisonaccia Airfield, Corsica, France, 9 January–4 February 1944 and 20 March–July 1944
Detachment operated from Borgo Airfield, Corsica, France, 5 February–July 1944
Detachment operated from Alghero Airfield, Sardinia, Italy, 11 May–22 June 1944

- Alghero Airfield, Sardinia, Italy, 22 June 1944
- Borgo Airfield, Corsica, France, 5 September 1944
- Pisa Airfield, Italy, 13 October 1944
- Pontedera Airfield, Italy c. 25 November 1944

Detachment operated from Florennes/Juzaine Airfield (A-78), Belgium, 27 January– c. 3 April 1945
Detachment operated from Strassfeld Airfield, Germany (Y-59), c. 3–23 April 1945

- Bagnoli Airfield, Italy, c. 15 July–7 August 1945
- Lemoore Army Air Field, California, 26 August 1945
- Camp Pinedale, California, 19 October 1945
- March Field, California, 8 March 1946
- Shaw Field, South Carolina, 15 August 1946 – 16 March 1947
- Rio Hato Airfield, Panama, 24 March– 1 September 1947
- Nellis Air Force Base, Nevada, 15 October 1969 – 30 December 1981
- Nellis Air Force Base, Nevada, 1 November 1991 – present

=== Aircraft ===
- Douglas A-20 Havoc, 1943
- Douglas P-70 Havoc, 1943
- Bristol Beaufighter, 1943–1945
- Lockheed P-38 Lightning, 1945
- P-51 Mustang, 1945, 1946–1947
- Northrop P-61 Black Widow, 1945, 1946–1947
- McDonnell F-4 Phantom II, 1969–1981
- General Dynamics F-16 Fighting Falcon, 1991–2005

== See also ==
- 481st Night Fighter Operational Training Group
- Exercise Red Flag
- Tactical Air Command
- Twelfth Air Force
