= De Havilland DH.14 Okapi =

DH.14 Okapi
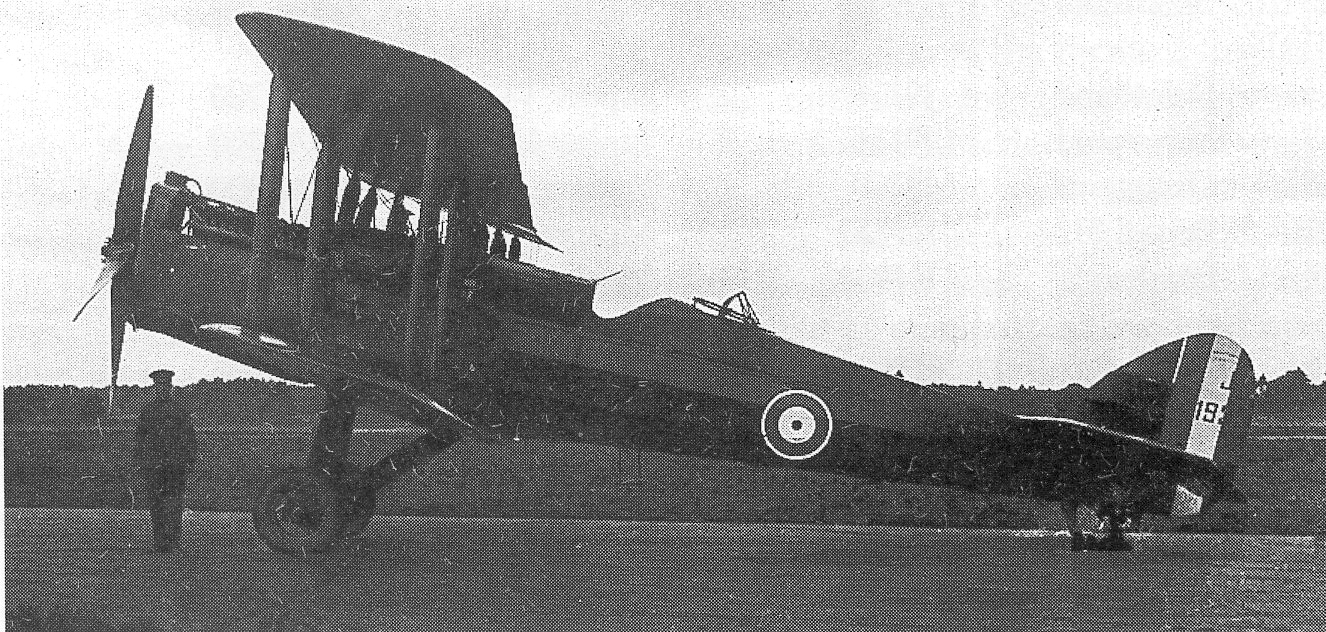

General information
- Type: Day bomber
- National origin: United Kingdom
- Manufacturer: Airco / de Havilland
- Status: abandoned prototype
- Primary users: Royal Air Force (trials only) Sidney Cotton
- Number built: 3

History
- First flight: 1919

The de Havilland DH.14 Okapi was a British two-seat day bomber of the 1910s built by de Havilland. The aircraft was designed as an Airco DH.4 and DH.9 replacement, but it never entered production.

== Design and development ==
The Okapi was a scaled-up Airco DH.9 with a bigger engine, (the Rolls-Royce Condor) intended as a replacement for the DH.4 and DH.9. Three were built, but due to the end of the First World War the Royal Air Force was reluctant to accept them. The third aircraft was the first to fly, and it was completed by Airco as the DH.14A, a two-seat long-range mail plane. The two military aircraft were completed by de Havilland in 1921 and used for trials. One suffered a fatal crash at Burnham Beeches on 10 February 1922 and no production aircraft were ordered.

== G-EAPY ==
The third aircraft was completed as the DH.14A to compete in the Daily Mail transatlantic flight competition. It had a Napier Lion engine and increased 586 imp gal (2,660 L; 704 US gal) fuel capacity. With the winning of the prize by Alcock and Brown the project was abandoned. The aircraft, registered G-EAPY, was then to be used by Sidney Cotton, who intended to try for the Australian government's £10,000 prize for a flight between England and Australia. Keith and Ross Smith won that prize before Cotton was ready.

The aircraft was loaned by Airco to Cotton to attempt the first flight between London and Cape Town. Cotton and an engineer from Napier left Hendon Aerodrome on 4 February 1920, but soon forced landed at Cricklewood with oil problems. Cotton reached Naples on the 21 February but they failed to find the aerodrome at Messina and they force-landed on a nearby beach.

G-EAPY was rebuilt by Airco with an additional third cockpit and sold to Cotton for use in the Aerial Derby. The aircraft was badly damaged when it forced landed following an onboard fire near Hertford on 24 July 1920. When the other two DH.14s were completed by de Havilland at Stag Lane in 1921 the DH.14A was repaired again and joined the test flying with a military serial number.

== Variants ==
- DH.14 – two-seat day bomber with a Rolls-Royce Condor engine, two built.
- DH.14A – two-seat long range mailplane with a Napier Lion Engine, one built.

== Operators ==
United Kingdom

- Royal Air Force

== Specifications (DH.14) ==
Data from The British Bomber since 1914

General characteristics

- Crew: Two
- Length: 33 ft 11 1/2 in (10.351 m)
- Wingspan: 50 ft 5 in (15.37 m)
- Height: 14 ft 0 in (4.27 m)
- Wing area: 617 sq ft (57.3 m^{2})
- Empty weight: 4,484 lb (2,034 kg)
- Max takeoff weight: 7,074 lb (3,209 kg)
- Powerplant: 1 × Rolls-Royce Condor I water-cooled V12 engine, 525 hp (391 kW)
- Propellers: wood fixed pitch propeller

Performance

- Maximum speed: 122 mph (196 km/h, 106 kn) at 10,000 ft (3,000 m)
- Endurance: 5 hours
- Rate of climb: 400 ft/min (2.0 m/s)

Armament

- Guns:
  - 1 × fixed forward-firing synchronised 0.303 in (7.7 mm) Vickers machine gun
  - 1 × 0.303 in (7.7 mm) Lewis gun on Scarff ring
- Bombs: 6 × 112 lb (51 kg) bombs in two fuselage bomb bays

== See also ==
- 1919 in aviation

Related lists

- List of de Havilland aircraft
- List of bomber aircraft
