= 10th Air Division =

10th Air Division (Defense)
- Active: 1950–1951; 1952–1960
- Country: United States
- Branch: United States Air Force

Insignia
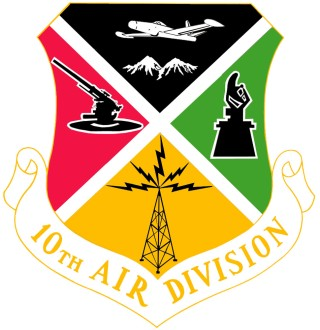
- 10th Air Division emblem (Note: Approved 17 December 1953. Dedcription: Per saltire, sable, gules, vert and or, saltire argent between in chief a jet aircraft in flight above two mountain peaks all of the last, in the flanks an anti aircraft gun and a radar antenna directed outward all of the first fimbriated silver, in base five electric flashes issuing from the apex of radio tower all black.)

"The 10th Air Division assumed responsibility for the air defense of Alaska south of the Alaskan Range on 1 November 1950. Subordinate units flew numerous interception and training missions. Between June 1957 and March 1960, the division operated and maintained Elmendorf Air Force Base, Alaska, plus several smaller installations. It was replaced by the 5070th Air Defense Wing (for air defense), and the 5040th Air Base Wing (for base operations) in August 1960."

== Lineage ==
- Established as the 10 Air Division (Defense) on 24 October 1950

Organized on 1 November 1950
Discontinued on 27 April 1951
Activated on 27 April 1951 (Note: The discontinuation and activation in April 1951 represents a change by the division's headquarters from a Table of Distribution unit to a Table of Organization unit. See List of MAJCOM wings of the United States Air Force.)
Inactivated on 20 July 1951
Activated on 1 November 1952
Discontinued and inactivated on 25 August 1960

=== Assignments ===
- Alaskan Air Command, 1 November 1950 – 27 April 1951
- Alaskan Air Command, 27 April 1951 – 20 July 1951
- Alaskan Air Command, 1 November 1952 – 25 August 1960

=== Components ===
==== Wing ====
- 5040 Air Base Wing: 1 June 57 – 25 August 1960

==== Groups ====
- 57th Fighter-Interceptor Group: attached c. 10 December 1950 – 27 April 1951 and 27 April 1951 – 20 July 1951; assigned 1 November 1952 – 13 April 1953
- 531st Aircraft Control and Warning Group: 17 November 1950 – 20 July 1951; 1 November 1952 - 13 April 1953
- 5039th Aircraft Control and Warning Group (later 5040th Aircraft Control and Warning Group), 1 June 1957 – 1 November 1959

==== Squadrons ====
Interceptor Squadrons

- 31st Fighter-Interceptor Squadron: 20 August 1957 – 8 October 1958
- 64th Fighter-Interceptor Squadron: 13 April 1953 – 15 August 1957
- 65th Fighter-Interceptor Squadron: 13 April 1953 – 1 November 1957
- 66th Fighter-Interceptor Squadron: 13 April 1953 – 1 December 1957
- 317th Fighter-Interceptor Squadron: 15 August 1957 – 25 August 1960

Aircraft Control and Warning Squadrons

- 625th Aircraft Control and Warning Squadron, 1 January 1950 – 1 November 1950
- 626th Aircraft Control and Warning Squadron, 13 April 1953 – 1 June 1957, 1 November 1959 - 1 August 1960
- 705th Aircraft Control and Warning Squadron, 13 April 1953 – 1 June 1957, 1 November 1959 - 1 August 1960
- 709th Aircraft Control and Warning Squadron, c. 1 October 1955 – 1 November 1957
- 712th Aircraft Control and Warning Squadron, c. 1 October 1955 – 1 November 1957
- 713th Aircraft Control and Warning Squadron, 1 November 1959 – 1 August 1960
- 714th Aircraft Control and Warning Squadron, 1 November 1959 – 1 August 1960
- 717th Aircraft Control and Warning Squadron, 13 April 1953 – 1 June 1957, 1 November 1959 - 1 August 1960
- 719th Aircraft Control and Warning Squadron, 13 April 1953 – 1 June 1957, 1 November 1959 - 1 August 1960
- 720th Aircraft Control and Warning Squadron, 8 September 1955 – 1 June 1957, 1 November 1959 - 1 August 1960
- 743d Aircraft Control and Warning Squadron, 1 October 1955 – 1 June 1957
- 794th Aircraft Control and Warning Squadron, 8 September 1955 – 1 June 1957, 1 November 1959 - 1 August 1960
- 795th Aircraft Control and Warning Squadron, 8 September 1955 – 1 June 1957, 1 November 1959 - 1 August 1960

Other Squadrons

- 5015 Radar Evaluation Flight, Electronic Counter Measures (later 5040 Radar Evaluation Flight, Electronic Counter Measures; 5070 Radar Evaluation Squadron (Target Electronic Counter Measures): 1 August 1957 – 1 August 1960.
- 5039 Air Transport Squadron (later 5040 Operations Squadron): 1 June 1957 – 1 October 1957; 1 February 1959 – 1 August 1960

=== Stations ===
- Elmendorf Air Force Base, Alaska, 1 November 1950 – 27 April 1951
- Elmendorf Air Force Base, Alaska, 27 April 1951 – 20 June 1951
- Elmendorf Air Force Base, Alaska, 1 November 1952 – 25 August 1960

== Commanders ==
- None (not crewed), 1 November 1950 – 9 December 1950
- Unknown, 10 December 1950 – 20 July 1951
- Colonel Allen R. Springer, 1 November 1952
- Colonel DeWitt S. Spain, July 1954
- Brigadier General Dolf E. Muehleisen, August 1954
- Colonel Donald W. Graham, July 1955
- Colonel James R. Gunn Jr., c. August 1955
- Colonel Louis E. Coira, 1 June 1957
- Colonel John T. Shields, 22 October 1957
- Colonel Jack A. Gibbs, 14 July 1959 – c.31 July 1960
- Unknown, 1 August 1960–15 August 1960

== Aircraft ==
- Lockheed F-80 Shooting Star, 1950–1951.
- Lockheed F-94 Starfire, 1952–1954
- Northrop F-89 Scorpion, 1953–1957
- Convair F-102 Delta Dagger, 1957–1960
- Fairchild C-119 Flying Boxcar, 1957
- Fairchild C-123 Provider, 1957–1960
- Martin RB-57 Canberra, c. 1957–1960
- Boeing TB-29 Superfortress, 1957–1960
- Douglas C-54 Skymaster, by 1959–1960
- Piasecki H-21 Workhorse, by 1959–1960
- de Havilland Canada L-20 Beaver, by 1959–1960

== See also ==
- List of United States Air Force air divisions
