= 57th Operations Group =

US Air Force unit

57th Operations Group

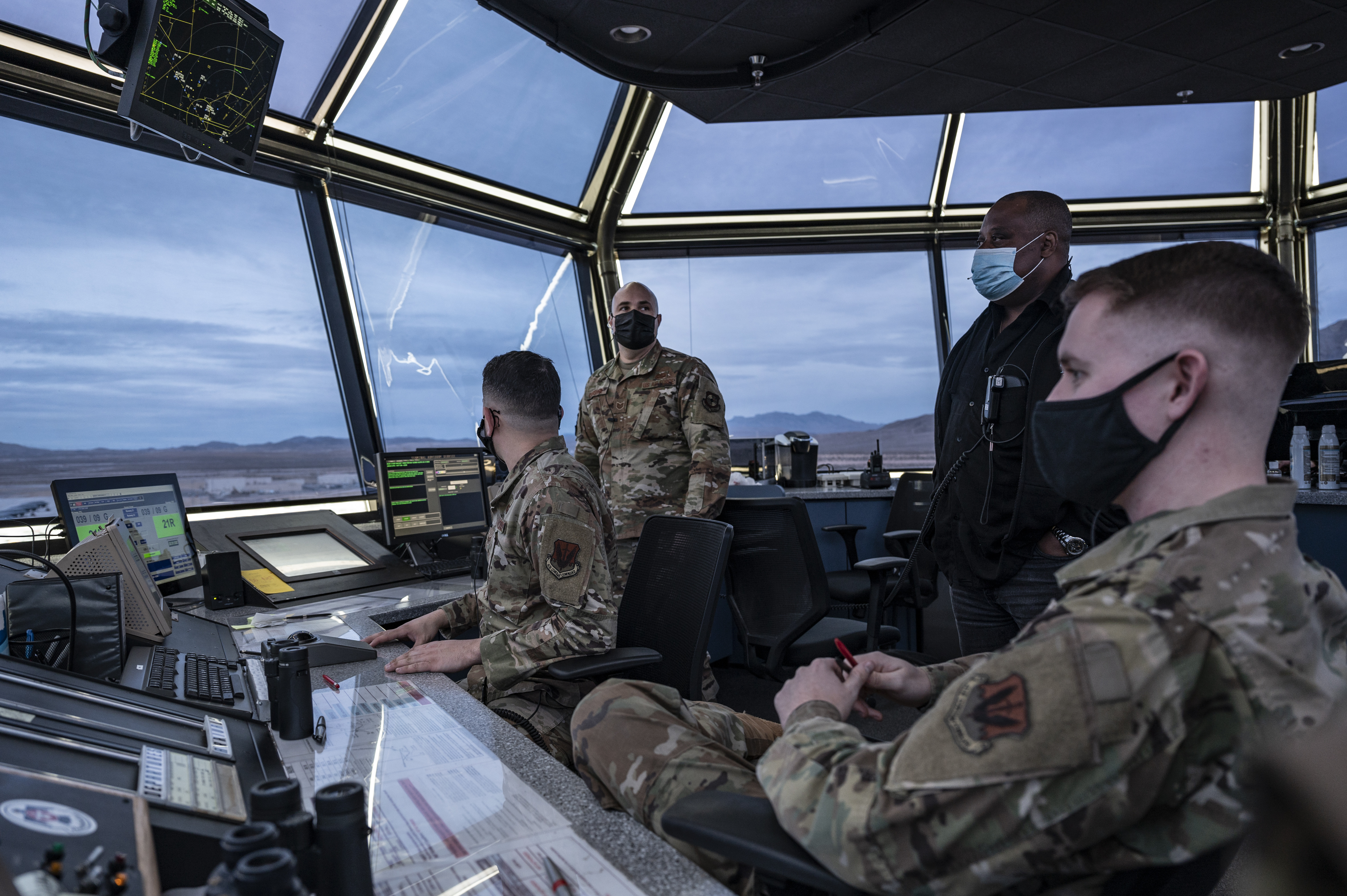
- Air traffic controllers assigned to the group's 57th Operations Support Squadron monitor traffic at Nellis AFB during a Red Flag exercise in 2021
- Active: 1941–1945; 1946–1953; 1961–1968; 1991–present
- Country: United States
- Branch: United States Air Force
- Role: Aggressor training
- Part of: Air Combat Command: United States Air Force Warfare Center; 57th Wing
- Garrison/HQ: Nellis Air Force Base, Nevada
- Motto: First in the Blue
- Engagements: World War II – EAME Theater; See Awards for more detail

- Decorations: Distinguished Unit Citation Air Force Outstanding Unit Award French Croix de Guerre with Palm

Insignia
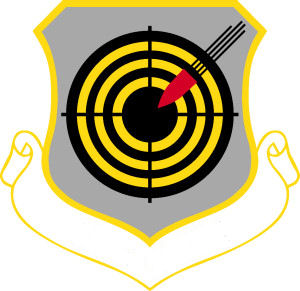
- 57th Operations Group emblem (Note: The 57th Operations Group uses the 57th Wing emblem with the group name on the scroll.)

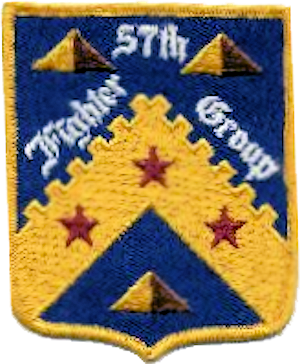
- Patch with 57th Fighter Group emblem (Approved 2 February 1950)

The 57th Operations Group (57 OG) is the operational component of the 57th Wing, assigned to the United States Air Force's Air Combat Command. The group is stationed at Nellis Air Force Base, Nevada.

The Group provides direct oversight of the Nellis flying mission through the 57th Operations Support Squadron. They manage the airfield, operate the air traffic control tower, and the Nellis Air Traffic Control Facility providing radar service to local flying operations and the National Airspace System. It is responsible for scheduling, training, life support, weapons, tactics and planning staff functions. In addition to these functions, it also maintains administrative oversight of the 57th ATG staff and the 57th Wing staff. The 57th OG also directs execution of two of the world's premier combat training exercises, Red Flag and Green Flag.

== Units ==
As of July 2022 the 57th Operations Group is made up of the below units. Unless otherwise stated, the units are based at Nellis AFB, Nevada.

- 6th Combat Training Squadron
- 12th Combat Training Squadron (Fort Irwin, California)
- 57th Information Aggressor Squadron
- 57th Operations Support Squadron
- 64th Aggressor Squadron (F-16 Fighting Falcon)
- 65th Aggressor Squadron (F-35 Lightning II)
- 414th Combat Training Squadron
- 507th Air Defense Aggressor Squadron
- 548th Combat Training Squadron (Green Flag East) (Fort Johnson, Louisiana)
- 549th Combat Training Squadron (Green Flag West)
- United States Air Force Thunderbirds

== History ==
See 57th Wing for associated lineage and timeline information.

=== World War II ===
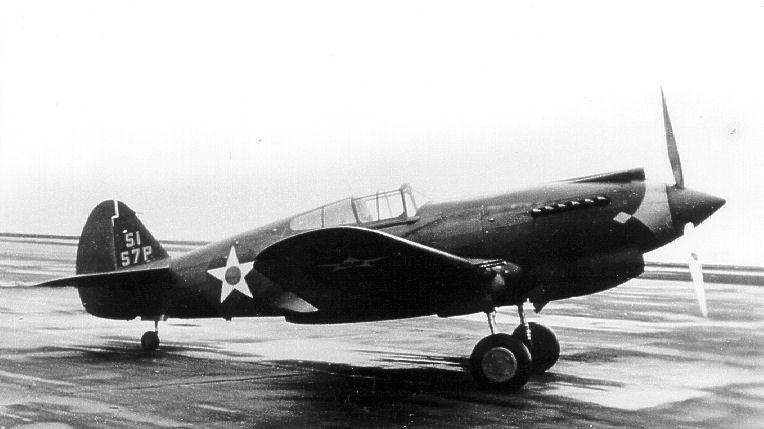
P-40C of the 57th Pursuit Group, probably taken at Windsor Locks, Connecticut, 1941

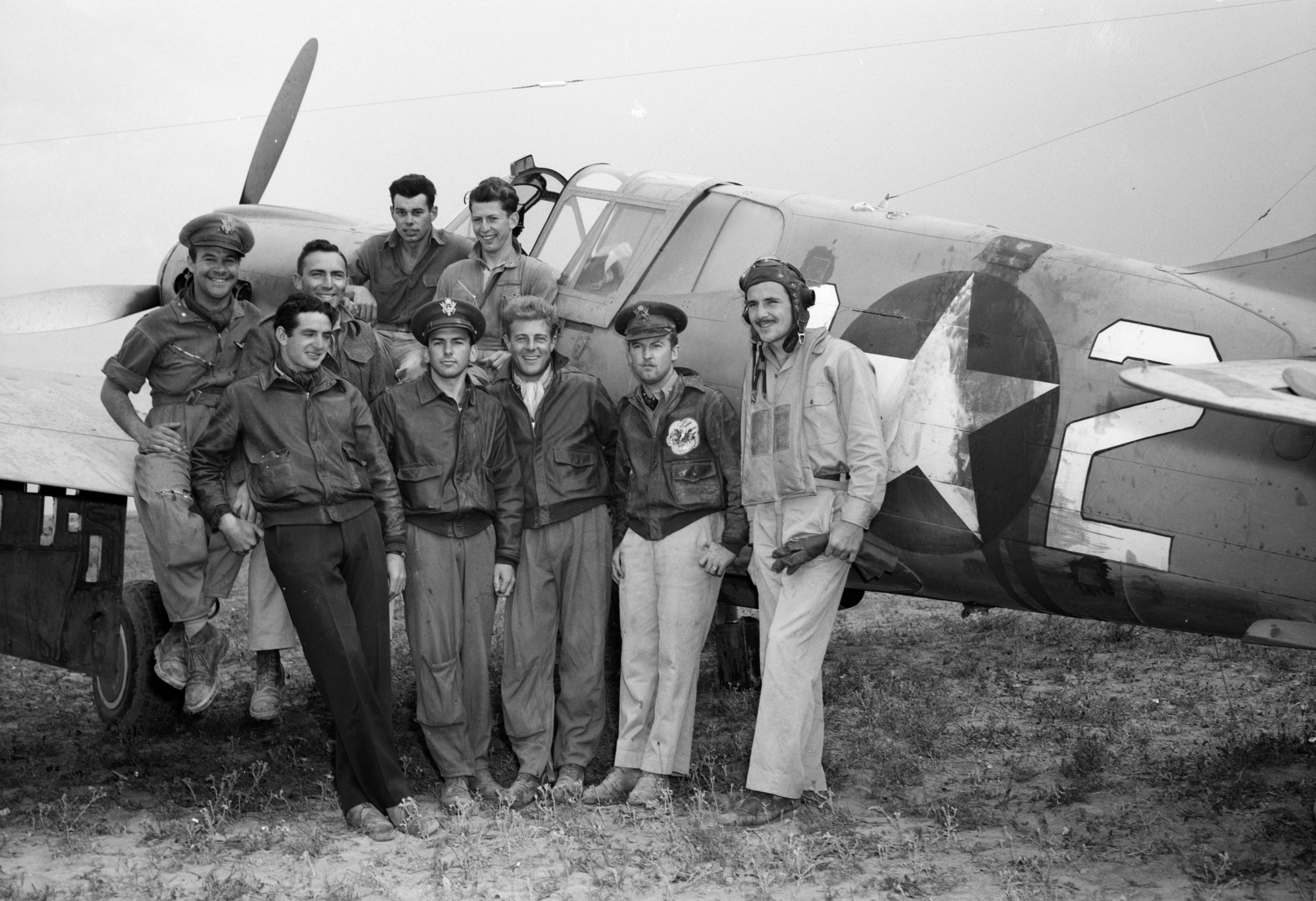
Pilots of the 64th FS, 57th FG, in North Africa, April 1943.

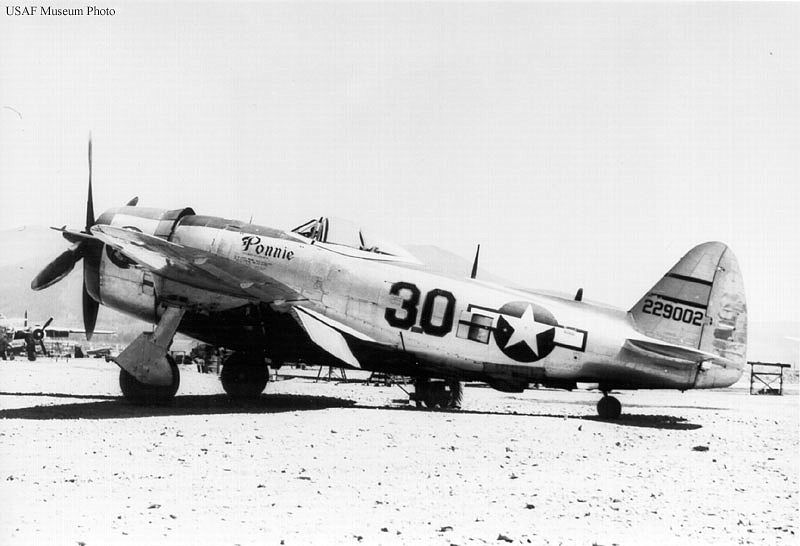
P-47D of the 57th Fighter Group, Italy, 1944

The group was first activated as the 57th Pursuit Group in January 1941, flying P-40 Warhawks as part of the Army Air Corps Northeast Defense Sector (later assigned to the I Fighter Command) at Mitchel Field, New York. It trained in New England and provided air defense of the northeast after the Japanese attack on Pearl Harbor. It was redesignated as the 57th Fighter Group (FG) in May 1942.

The 57th FG was reassigned to the U.S. Army Middle East Force in Egypt. In June 1942 the pilots and 72 new P-40Fs loaded aboard the aircraft carrier Ranger at Quonset Point, Rhode Island, sailing 1 July. On 19 July, off the Gold Coast, they launched in four sections of 18 aircraft and flew to Accra, thence across Equatorial Africa to Palestine, officially becoming part of IX Fighter Command. However, prior to the group officially commencing operations, individual 57th FG pilots were attached to, and flew combat sorties with, P-40 squadrons of the Royal Air Force (RAF), South African Air Force (SAAF) and Royal Australian Air Force (RAAF), belonging to No. 211 Group, Desert Air Force.

In October 1942, the 57th FG officially began combat operations as a formation. The group took part in the Battle of El Alamein and, as part of Ninth Air Force, supported the Commonwealth Eighth Army's drive across Egypt and Libya, escorting bombers and flying strafing and dive-bombing missions against airfields, communications, and troop concentrations until Axis defeat in Tunisia in May 1943. The unit participated in the reduction of Pantelleria (May–June 1943) and the conquest of Sicily (July–August 1943). For front-line operations in direct support of the Eighth Army from the Battle of El Alamein to the capitulation of enemy forces in Sicily, the group received a Distinguished Unit Citation (DUC).

In an aerial battle over the Gulf of Tunis at Cape Bon in April 1943, the group destroyed approximately 74 of the enemy's transport and fighter aircraft while sending an equal number down to the sea and beaches to escape by crash landing. The 57th lost just six aircraft in this melee. Forever known by the 57th as the 18 April 1943 Goose Shoot – "The Palm Sunday Massacre," it received another DUC and it added four newly created aces. This action broke the German's aerial supply line and they surrendered Tunisia thirty days later.

The 57th supported the British Eighth Army's landing at Termoli and subsequent operations in Italy, being reassigned to Twelfth Air Force in August 1943. It flew dive-bombing, strafing, patrol, and escort missions.

Early in 1944, the group converted to P-47 Thunderbolt aircraft and flew interdiction operations in Italy. The group moved to Corsica on 30 March 1944 to operate as a separate task force. It flew interdiction missions against railroads, communication targets, and motor vehicles behind enemy lines, providing a minimum of 48 fighter-bomber sorties per day. During 9 days of combat operations during early April 1944, the 57th exceeded 50 sorties per day. While the group was stationed on Corsica, director William Wyler made a 45-minute long Technicolor documentary film, Thunderbolt!. filming combat missions of the 57th. The film concentrated on Operation Strangle. The film was released for the military in 1945 and for general release in 1947.

The group earned a third DUC c. 14 April 1944 for attacks in the Florence-Arezzo area. The group participated in the French campaign against Elba in June 1944 and in the invasion of Southern France in August. It engaged in interdiction and support operations in northern Italy from September 1944 to May 1945. For its operations in the Mediterranean Theater of Operations, the 57th earned the French Croix de Guerre with Palm (awarded in late 1967). It was inactivated on 13 April 1953.

The group remained in northern Italy after the end of the European War, demobilizing throughout the summer of 1945. It was reassigned to the United States in August 1945 and was inactivated at the end of August.

=== Cold War ===
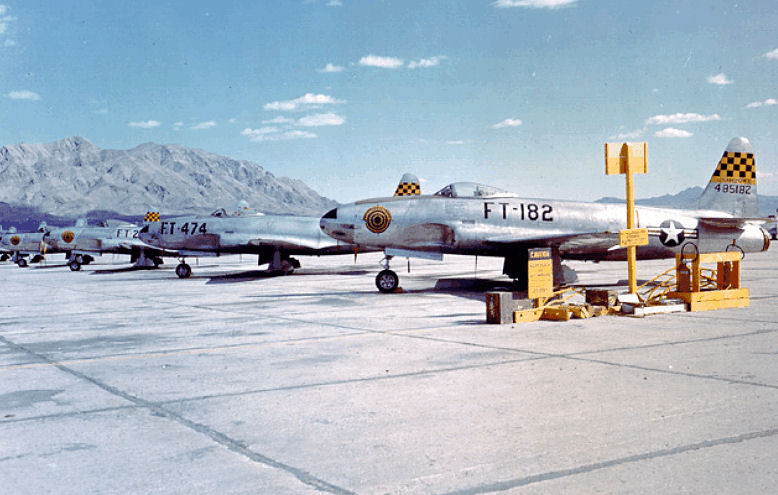
Lockheed P-80 Shooting Stars of the 57th Fighter-interceptor Group, 1950

The group was reactivated in August 1946 and assigned to Alaskan Air Command as part of the air defense forces in the northwest Pacific. The group assumed the mission, personnel and equipment of the 343d Fighter Group, which was simultaneously inactivated at Shemya Army Air Base. It provided air defense initially in the Aleutian Islands, then moved in 1947 to Elmendorf Air Force Base. In 1948, as a result of the wing/base reorganization of the Air Force (Hobson Plan), the group became part of the 57th Fighter Wing, which included three support groups in addition to the group. In January 1950, it was redesignated as the 57th Fighter-Interceptor Group. In January 1951, its parent 57th Fighter-Interceptor Wing inactivated, although the group remained active as part of the AAC air defense until 1 November 1952 when its personnel were reassigned and it became a paper unit. It was inactivated on 13 April 1953.

The group was reactivated at Paine Field, WA as the 57th Fighter Group (Air Defense) and assigned to Air Defense Command's Seattle Air Defense Sector, assuming the equipment and personnel of the 326th Fighter Group, which was simultaneously inactivated. It was assigned the 64th Fighter-Interceptor Squadron, which was already at Paine with the 326th flying Convair F-102 Delta Daggers as its operational element and also several support units as it assumed USAF host unit duties at Paine. It provided air defense over the Pacific Northwest. In June 1966, it briefly became non-operational when its 64th Squadron moved to Southeast Asia and was assigned away from the group. However, after two weeks, the 498th Fighter-Interceptor Squadron, flying Convair F-106 Delta Darts, moved to Paine and became the group's new operational squadron. It was inactivated 30 September 1968 when Air Defense Command closed its facilities at Paine AFB.

=== From 1991 ===
On 1 November 1991, the group was redesignated the 57th Operations Group and activated as a result of the 57th Fighter Wing implementing the USAF objective wing organization. The 57 OG was assigned control of the wing's tactical units.

Upon activation, the 57th OG managed Air Force tactical training through Red Flag and Air Warrior exercises. Between July 1995 and March 2002, the group gained the three MQ-1 Predator reconnaissance squadrons. The Group deployed the Predator elements of the 11th and 15th Squadrons in support of operations in Bosnia (April 2000), Kuwait (October 2000), and Pakistan, September 2001 – January 2002 in support of Operation Enduring Freedom. The 57th Group's 66th Helicopter Squadron also deployed for operations in Northern Watch and Enduring Freedom. While at Nellis, the Group continued to provide air combat units for US and Allies with realistic, large force combat training at Red Flag.

From 1 July 2005 to 1 March 2018 the group was non-flying as the flying squadrons of the 57th were split off into the new 57th Adversary Tactics Group, which consolidated all Aggressor activities under one group to provide the Combat Air Forces with the opportunity to train against a realistic, fully integrated threat array during large- and small-scale exercises such as Red Flag – Nellis, Red Flag – Alaska, Maple Flag, Green Flag and dissimilar air combat training deployments.

On 2 March 2017 the group activated the 24th Tactical Air Support Squadron and once again is flying the F-16.

On 31 March 2020, the 57th Adversary Tactics Group merged back into the 57th Operations Group, bringing the 64th Aggressor Squadron and its F-16s with it.

== Lineage ==
- Constituted as the 57th Pursuit Group (Interceptor) on 20 November 1940

Activated on 15 January 1941
Redesignated as 57th Fighter Group (Single Engine) on 15 May 1942
Inactivated on 7 November 1945

- Activated on 15 August 1946

Redesignated as 57th Fighter-Interceptor Group on 20 January 1950
Inactivated on 13 April 1953

- Redesignated as 57th Fighter Group (Air Defense) and activated on 24 February 1961 (not organized)

Organized on 1 April 1961
Discontinued and inactivated on 30 September 1968
Redesignated as 57th Fighter Weapons Group on 31 July 1985 (remained inactive)

- Redesignated as 57th Operations Group on 1 November 1991 and activated

=== Assignments ===
- 7th Pursuit Wing, 15 January 1941
- I Interceptor Command (later I Fighter Command, 1 September 1941
- IX Fighter Command, c. 16 July 1942
- U.S. Army Middle East Force, July 1942

Attached to Desert Air Task Force, 22 October 1942

- IX Fighter Command, 12 November 1942

Attached to: Western Desert Air Force, 21 February 1943
Attached to: Desert Air Force, c. April 1943
Attached to: 7 South African Air Force No. 7 (South African) Wing?, 21 May 1943
Attached to: XII Air Support Command, 22 August 1943

- Twelfth Air Force, 30 August 1943
- XII Air Support Command, 1 September 1943
- 57th Bombardment Wing, 1 November 1943
- Unknown (probably XII Air Support Command), 2 January – 4 March 1944

Attached to 64th Fighter Wing, 2 March 1944

- XII Air Support Command (later XXII Tactical Air Command), 5 March 1944

Remained attached to 64th Fighter Wing] until 28 March 1944

- 87th Fighter Wing, 23 April 1944
- XII Tactical Air Command, 10 September 1944
- XII Fighter (later, XII Tactical Air) Command, 15 September 1944
- Twelfth Air Force, 7 June – 7 August 1945
- Unknown, 8–22 August 1945
- Third Air Force, 23 August – 7 November 1945
- Alaskan Air Command, 15 August 1946

Attached to Yukon Sector, Alaskan Air Command, 16–21 April 1947

- Headquarters, Fort Richardson, Alaska (later 57th Fighter Wing, Provisional), 20 November 1947 – 19 April 1948)
- 57th Fighter Wing, 20 April 1948

Attached to 10th Air Division [Defense], 10 December 1950

- Alaskan Air Command, 1 January 1951

Remained attached to 10th Air Division [Defense] until 1 March 1951

- 10th Air Division (Defense), 1 November 1952 – 13 April 1953
- Air Defense Command, 24 February 1961
- Seattle Air Defense Sector, 1 April 1961 – 30 September 1968
- 57th Fighter Wing, 1 November 1991–present

=== Components ===
Operational Squadrons

- 11th Reconnaissance Squadron: 29 July 1995 – 1 May 2007
- 12th Combat Training Squadron: ? - present
- 15th Reconnaissance Squadron: 1 August 1997 – 1 May 2007
- 17th Reconnaissance Squadron: 8 March 2002 – 1 May 2007
- 24th Tactical Air Support Squadron: 2 March 2018 – 23 December 2020
- 58th Rescue Squadron: 14 June 2002 – 1 October 2003
- 64th Fighter (later 64th Fighter-Interceptor, 64th Aggressor) Squadron: 15 January 1941 – 7 November 1945; 15 August 1946 – 13 April 1953; 1 April 1961 – 10 June 1966; 3 October 2003 – 15 September 2005; 31 March 2020 - present
- 65th Fighter (later, 65th Fighter-Interceptor, 65th Aggressor) Squadron: 15 January 1941 – 7 November 1945; 15 August 1946 – 13 April 1953; 9 June 2022 - present
- 66th Fighter (later 66th Fighter-Interceptor) Squadron: 15 January 1941 – 7 November 1945; 15 August 1946 – 13 April 1953
- 57th USAF Dispensary: 1 April 1961 – 30 September 1968
- 57th Air Base Squadron (later 57th Combat Support Squadron): 1 April 1961 – 30 September 1968
- 57th Consolidated Aircraft Maintenance Squadron: 1 April 1961 – 30 September 1968
- 57th Materiel Squadron: 1 April 1961 – 1 August 1964
- 57th Operations Support Squadron: 1 November 1991 – present
- 57th Supply Squadron 1 August 1964 – 30 September 1968
- 66th Rescue Squadron: 1 February 1993 – 1 October 2003
- 414th Combat Training Squadron: 4 October 2007 – present
- 498th Fighter-Interceptor Squadron: 25 June 1966 – 30 September 1968
- 547th Intelligence Squadron, 1 November 1991 – 15 September 2005
- 548th Combat Training Squadron: 4 October 2007 – present
- 549th Combat Training Squadron: 4 October 2007 – present
- 561st Fighter Squadron: 1 February 1993 – 1 October 1996.

=== Stations ===
- Mitchel Field, New York, 15 January 1941
- Bradley Field, Connecticut], 19 August 1941
- Boston Airport, Massachusetts, 8 December 1941-c. 1 July 1942
- Fort Dix Army Air Field, New Jersey, 5 July 1942
- New York Port of Embarkation, New York, 15–16 July 1942
- Muqeible Airfield, British Mandate of Palestine, c. 20 July 1942
- Landing Ground 174, Egypt, 16 September 1942
- RAF El Daba, Egypt, 5 November 1942
- Sidi Haneish Airfield, Egypt, 8 November 1942
- Sidi Azeiz Airfield, Libya, 12 November 1942
- RAF Gambut, Libya, 13 November 1942
- Martuba Airfield, Libya, 16 November 1942
- Belandah Airfield, Libya, 3 December 1942
- Hamraiet Airfield, Libya, 3 January 1943
- Darragh Airfield, Libya, 19 January 1943
- Ben Gardane Airfield, Tunisia, 9 March 1943
- Soltane Airfield, Tunisia, 21 March 1943
- Hazbub Airfield, Tunisia, 4 April 1943
- Chekira Airfield, Tunisia, 10 April 1943
- El Djem Airfield, Tunisia, 14 April 1943
- Hani Airfield, Tunisia, 21 April 1943
- Bou Grara Airfield, Tunisia, May 1943
- Malta, 27 June 1943
- Pachino Airfield, Sicily, 19 July 1943
- Scordia Airfield, Sicily, August 1943
- Milazzo Airfield, Sicily, 12 September 1943
- Messina Airfield, Sicily, 15 September 1943
- Reggio Airfield, Italy, 16 September 1943
- Rocca Bernardo Airfield, Italy, 17 September 1943
- Gioia del Colle Air Base, Italy, c. 25 September 1943
- Foggia Airfield, Italy, 30 September 1943
- Amendola Airfield, Italy, c. 27 October 1943
- Cercola Airfield, Italy, 1 March 1944
- Alto Airfield, Corsica, 30 March 1944
- Ombrene Airfield, Italy, 9 September 1944
- Grosseto Airfield, Italy, 24 September 1944
- Villafranca di Verona Airfield, Italy, 29 April 1945
- Grosseto Airfield, Italy, 7 May 1945
- Bagnoli Airfield, Italy, 15 July 1945
- Naples Capodichino Airport, Italy, 5–6 August 1945
- Camp Miles Standish, Massachusetts, 18 August 1945
- Drew Field, Florida, 23 August – 7 November 1945
- Shemya Army Air Base, Aleutian Islands, Alaska, 15 August 1946
- Elmendorf Field, Alaska, 25 March 1947 – 13 April 1953
- Paine Field, Washington, 1 April 1961 – 30 September 1968
- Nellis Air Force Base, Nevada, 1 November 1991 – present

=== Aircraft assigned ===
- Curtiss P-40 Warhawk, 1941–1944
- Republic P-47 Thunderbolt, 1944–1945
- Lockheed P-38 Lightning, 1946
- North American P-51 Mustang, 1946–1948
- Lockheed F-80 Shooting Star, 1948–1951
- Lockheed F-94 Starfire, 1951–1952
- Convair F-102 Delta Dagger, 1961–1966
- Convair F-106 Delta Dart, 1966–1968
- McDonnell F-4 Phantom II, 1993–1996
- Sikorsky HH-60 Pave Hawk, 1993–2003
- General Atomics MQ-1 Predator, 1995–2005
- General Dynamics F-16 Fighting Falcon, 2003–2005, 2018–present
- Lockheed Martin F-35 Lightning II, 2022–present

=== Awards ===

- Distinguished Unit Citation
- North Africa and Sicily, 24 October 1942 – 17 August 1943
- Tunis and Cape Bon Area, 18 April 1943
- Italy, 14 April 1944

- Air Force Outstanding Unit Award
- 1 January 1995 – 31 May 1997
- 1 June 1998 – 31 May 2000
- 1 June 2001 – 31 May 2003
- 1 June 2003 – 31 May 2004
- 1 June 2004 – 31 May 2006

- French Croix de Guerre with Palm, October 1942 – May 1945

- European-African-Middle Eastern Theater
- Campaigns

Air Combat, EAME Theater
Egypt-Libya
Tunisia
Sicily
Naples-Anzio
Rome-Arno
Southern France
Northern Apennines
Po Valley

== See also ==
- Aerospace Defense Command Fighter Squadrons
- SS Sea Owl
