= Messina Airfield =

Italian military airfield during World War II

Messina Airfield
- Part of Twelfth Air Force

Site information
- Type: Military airfield
- Controlled by: United States Army Air Forces

Location
- Coordinates: 38°12′00.00″N 015°33′00.00″E

Site history
- Built: 1943
- In use: 1943
- Battles/wars: World War II

Location of Messina Airfield, Italy

Messina Airfield is an abandoned World War II military airfield in Italy, which was located just to the west of Messina in Sicily. It was a temporary field built by the Army Corps of Engineers used as part of the Allied invasion of Italy.

The airfield was primarily used by the United States Army Air Force Twelfth Air Force 57th Fighter Group during 15–16 September 1943, flying combat operations with P-40 Warhawks.

When the 57th moved out to Reggio on the Itralian mainland the airfield was closed and dismantled. Today, there are no traces of the airfield remaining on the landscape visible from aerial photography, as the area has been developed as part of the urban area over the past 60 years.
