= Hani Airfield =

Abandoned World War II military airfield in Tunisia

Hani Airfield
- Part of Ninth Air Force

Site information
- Type: Military airfield
- Controlled by: United States Army Air Forces

Location
- Coordinates: 35°41′59.26″N 010°12′05.76″E

Site history
- Built: 1943
- In use: 1943

Location of Hani Airfield, Tunisia

Hani Airfield is an abandoned World War II military airfield in Tunisia, which was located near Hani, six miles east of Kairouan (Al Qayrawan) and about 125 km south-southwest of Tunis.

It was a temporary airfield built by the United States Army Corps of Engineers, used by the United States Army Air Force Ninth Air Force during the Tunisian Campaign.

It was used by the 57th Fighter Group, which flew P-40 Warhawks from the airfield between 21 April–May 1943 during the British Eighth Army's advance into Tunisia from Libya, to which the 57th was attached.

On 17 April 1943, Bofors guns of the British 37th (Tyne Electrical Engineers) Light Anti-Aircraft Regiment, Royal Artillery (with 291 Heavy Anti-Aircraft Battery also under command) took over defence of the Hani Landing Grounds. Planes of 79th Pursuit Group, USAAF, arrived at Hani West the following day, with the advanced party of 57th Pursuit Group reaching Hani East on 21 April. Aircraft of the 57th PG began operating from Hani East on 23 April.

When the Americans moved out at the end of April 1943, the airfield was dismantled and abandoned. The runway still remains clearly visible.
