= Pontedera Airport =

Pontedera Airport Aeroporto di Pontedera/Aeroscalo di Pontedera
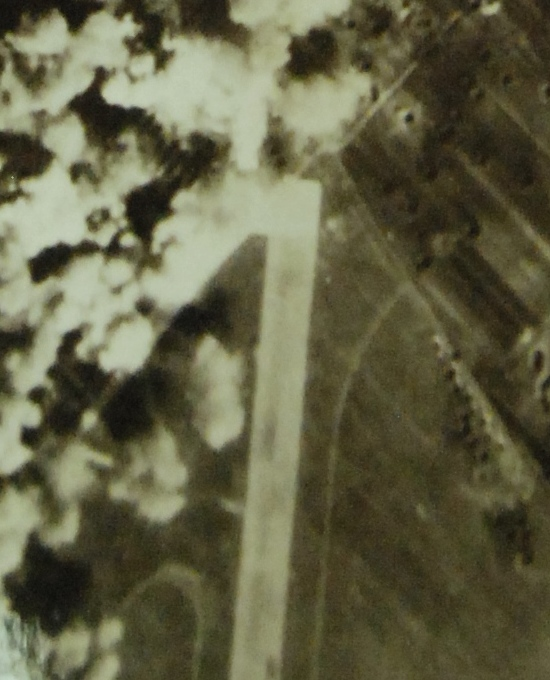
- IATA: none; ICAO: LIAT

Summary
- Airport type: Military and industrial (now dismantled)
- Location: Pontedera
- Elevation AMSL: 39 ft / 12 m
- Coordinates: 43°39′00″N 10°37′00″E
- Interactive map of Pontedera Airport

Runways
Direction	Length		Surface
Direction	ft	m	Surface
			Asphalt

The Pontedera airport (ICAO: LIAT) was an airport located in Pontedera, Italy. It was built south-west of the city centre in 1913.

== History ==
It was built as an airport for airships, by the Royal Italian Navy, just before the beginning of the First World War. Later it became an airport for military planes and used also by Piaggio for testing vehicles. Its importance faded after the Second World War, the hangars were closed and destroyed and the runway was dismantled around the year 2000.

== Bibliography ==
- Quirici, Michele; Gori, Paolo (2000). L'aeroscalo di Pontedera. I dirigibili italiani (in Italian). Pontedera: CLD Libri. p. 191. ISBN 88-87748-15-2.

== See also ==
- Galileo Galilei International Airport
