= Chekira Airfield =

World War II military airfield in Tunisia

Chekira Airfield
- Part of Ninth Air Force

Site information
- Type: Military Airfield
- Controlled by: United States Army Air Forces

Location
- Coordinates: 34°06′29.92″N 010°01′07.16″E

Site history
- Built: 1943
- In use: 1943

Location of Chekira Airfield, Tunisia

Chekira Airfield is an abandoned World War II military airfield in Tunisia, which was located near Wadi al `Akarit (Qabis), about 300 km south of Tunis.

It was a temporary airfield built by the United States Army Corps of Engineers, used by the United States Army Air Force Ninth Air Force during the Tunisian Campaign. It was used by the 57th Fighter Group, which flew P-40 Warhawks from the airfield between 10-14 1943 during the British Eighth Army's advance into Tunisia from Libya, to which the 57th was attached.

When the Americans moved out at the end of April 1943, the airfield was dismantled and abandoned. The airfield's precise location is now undetermined, as agricultural fields have obliterated its existence.
