= Bou Grara Airfield =

World War II airfield in Tunisia

Bou Grara Airfield
- Part of Ninth Air Force

Site information
- Type: Military Airfield
- Controlled by: United States Army Air Forces

Location
- Coordinates: 33°32′35.14″N 010°40′30.04″E

Site history
- Built: 1943
- In use: 1943

Location of Bou Grara Airfield, Tunisia

Bou Grara Airfield is an abandoned World War II military airfield in Tunisia, near Golfe de Bou Grara (Madanin), about 360 km south-southeast of Tunis.

It was a temporary airfield built by the United States Army Corps of Engineers, used by the United States Army Air Force Ninth Air Force during the Tunisian Campaign. It was used by the 57th Fighter Group, which flew P-40 Warhawks from the airfield during May and June 1943.

When the Americans moved out at the end of April 1943, the airfield was dismantled and abandoned. The airfield's precise location has become undetermined, as agricultural fields have obliterated its existence.
