= Nanur Airport =

- IATA: none; ICAO: none; LID: HL83

Summary
- Airport type: Civil
- Operator: Government
- Location: Libya
- Elevation AMSL: 185 ft / 56 m
- Coordinates: 31°42′20″N 14°54′40″E

Map
- Location of the airport in Libya

Runways
Direction	Length		Surface
Direction	m	ft	Surface
13/31	3,898	12,789	Asphalt
- Sources: GCM

Nanur Airport is an airport in the Wadi Maymun Darraj region of Libya, located approximately 200 km south-southeast of Tripoli in the Libyan desert. Although listed as a civil airport, it appears to function as a reserve Libyan Air Force airfield. It comprises a long runway with a parallel taxiway and a parking ramp. There are no permanent structures visible, nor are there any production oilfields in the area.

== World War II ==
During World War II the airfield, then known as Darragh Airfield was used as a military airfield by the United States Army Air Force Ninth Air Force 57th Fighter Group during the North African Campaign against Axis forces. The 57th flew P-40 Warhawks from the airfield between 19 January-3 March 1943 before moving forward with the British Eighth Army.

The current airfield appears to be overlaid on its World War II predecessor facility.

== See also ==
- Transport in Libya
- List of airports in Libya
