= Martuba Airbase =

Martuba Airbase Martuba Airport
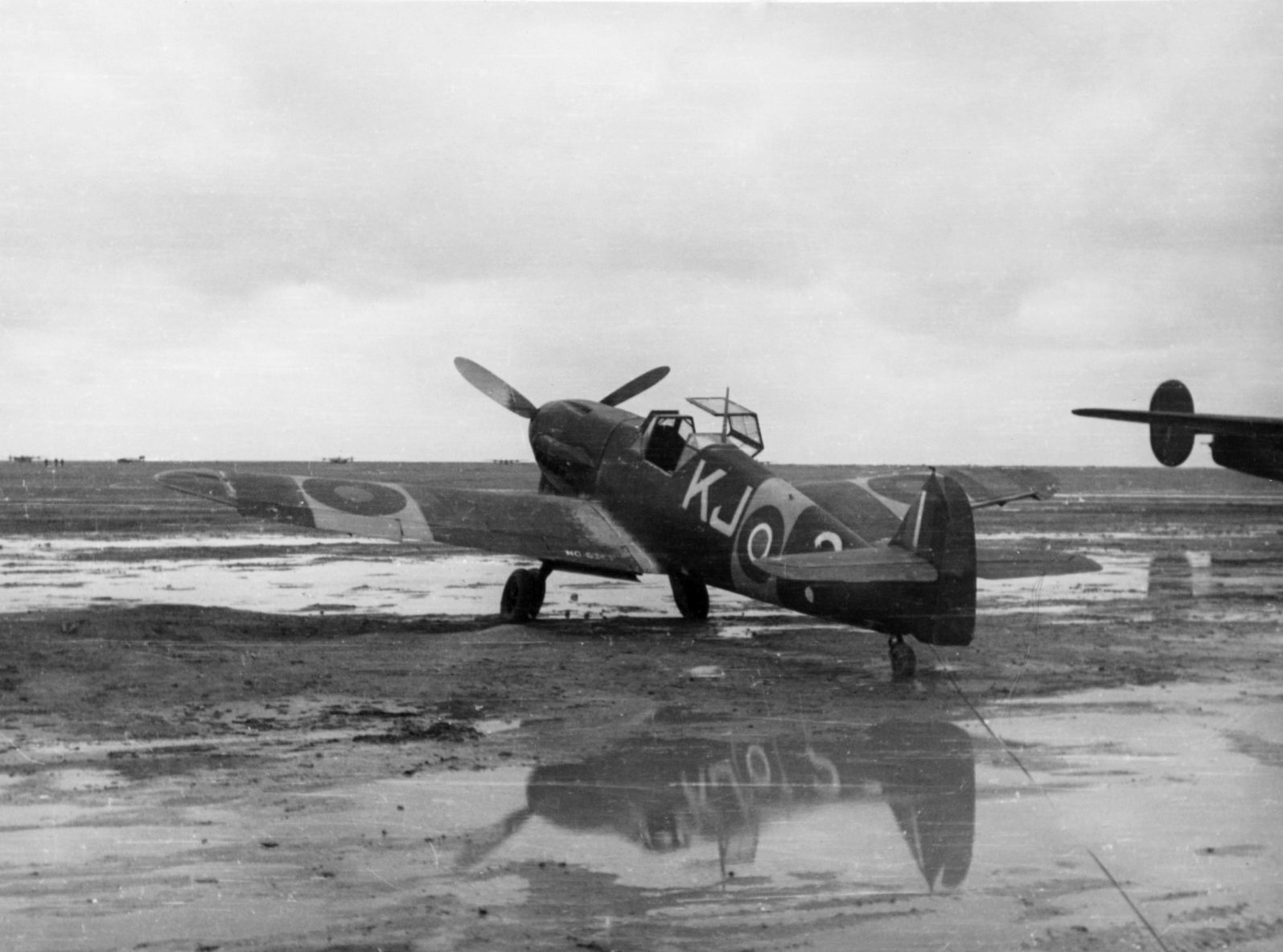
- IATA: DNF; ICAO: none

Summary
- Airport type: Military/Public
- Owner: Libyan National Army
- Operator: Libyan Air Force
- Location: Martuba, Libya
- Elevation AMSL: 1,235 ft / 376 m
- Coordinates: 32°32′30″N 22°44′40″E

Map
- Location in Libya

Runways
Direction	Length		Surface
Direction	m	ft	Surface
14/32	3,620	11,877	Asphalt
- Source: GCM WAC Google Maps

Martuba Airbase is a Libyan Air Force (Arabic: القوات الجوية الليبية, Berber: Adwas Alibyan Ujnna) base in the Derna District of Libya, located approximately 27 kilometres (17 mi) south-southeast of Derna, and 268 kilometres (167 mi) east-northeast of Benghazi.

== History ==
During World War II the airfield, then known as Martuba Airfield, was used as a military airfield by the United States Army Air Force 57th Fighter Group, during the North African Campaign against Axis forces. The 57th flew P-40 Warhawks from the airfield 16 November-3 December 1942.

Following the British victory at El Alamein during the Second World War, the airfield at Maturba saw heavy fighting in 1942, as Rommel's Afrika Korps was pushed back from the Egyptian border.

== Military use ==
The airbase's primary use is by the Libyan Air Force, which has two sections at the base. The first section contains the main buildings and the hangars that house Mil Mi-2 and Mil Mi-8 helicopters. The second section is the flight-line containing taxiways, a ramp, and a single runway. The runway has an additional 300 metres (980 ft) paved overrun on each end.

An Aeritalia G.222 is stored on the ramp, but this section of the base appears to be a reserve facility.

== Civilian use ==
The site is also used for the transportation of oil field workers from production facilities in the area.

== See also ==
- Transport in Libya
- List of airports in Libya
