= Soltane Airfield =

Former military airfield in Tunisia

Soltane Airfield
- Part of Ninth Air Force

Site information
- Type: Military airfield
- Controlled by: United States Army Air Forces

Location
- Coordinates: 33°20′09.20″N 009°51′56.52″E

Site history
- Built: 1943
- In use: 1943

Location of Soltane Airfield, Tunisia

Soltane Airfield is an abandoned World War II military airfield in Tunisia, which was located approximately 5 km southeast of Ain Soltane (Sidi-Nsar-Allah), about 170 km south-southwest of Tunis.

It was a temporary airfield built by the United States Army Corps of Engineers, used by the United States Army Air Force Ninth Air Force during the Tunisian Campaign. It was used by the 57th Fighter Group, which flew P-40 Warhawks from the airfield between 21 March and 4 April 1943.

When the Americans moved out at the end of April 1943, the airfield was dismantled and abandoned. The airfield's precise location is now undetermined, as agricultural fields have obliterated its existence.
