= Grosseto Airport =

Grosseto Airport Aeroporto di Grosseto

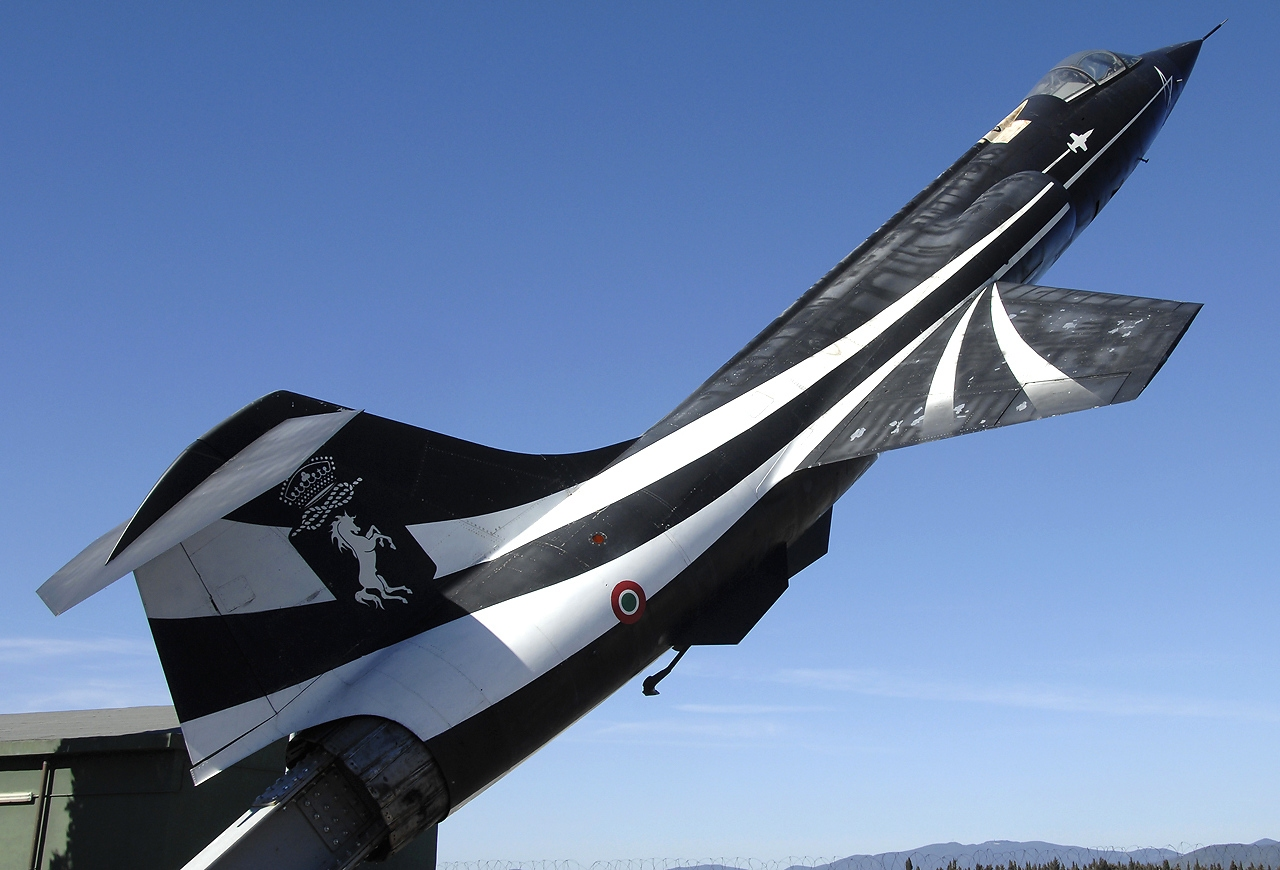
- IATA: GRS; ICAO: LIRS

Summary
- Airport type: Military / Public
- Operator: Aeronautica Militare / Società di Esercizio dell'Aeroporto della Maremma S.p.A. (SEAM)
- Serves: Grosseto, Italy
- Elevation AMSL: 15 ft (4.6 m)
- Coordinates: 42°45′35″N 011°04′18″E

Map
- Location of air base in Italy

Runways
| Direction | Length | | Surface |
| Direction | m | ft | Surface |
|---|---|---|---|
| 03L/21R | 2,994 | 9,823 | Asphalt |
| 03R/21L | 2,356 | 7,729 | Asphalt |

Statistics (2024)
- Passengers: 2,271
- Passenger change 23-24: ▼ -44.2%
- Aircraft movements: 1,279
- Movements change 23-24: ▼ -39.8%
- Source: Statistics from Assaeroporti

Grosseto Airport (Italian: Aeroporto di Grosseto) (IATA: GRS, ICAO: LIRS) is an airport in central Italy, located 3 km (1.9 mi) west of the city center of Grosseto in the Italian region of Tuscany.

Although it is classified as a "joint use" facility, Grosseto Airport is primarily an Italian Air Force (Aeronautica Militare) Base, home of the 4th Stormo, equipped with the Eurofighter Typhoon. However, the facility is used as a commercial airport by civilian charter flights and private aircraft.

== History ==
During World War II the airfield, referred to as "Grosetta Main", was used by the United States Army Air Forces' Twelfth Air Force. The 86th Fighter Group flew P-47 Thunderbolts from the field between 17 September and 6 November 1944. Later, the 57th Fighter Group, used the airfield from 24 September 1944 to 29 April 1945, and later between 7 May and 15 July 1945, also flying combat operations with P-47s. The 47th Bomb Group, and its four squadrons, the 84th, 85th, 86th, and 97th, using A-20 and A-26 Attack aircraft also used the airfield, mostly flying night intruder missions, from 11 December 1944 to 23 June 1945.

In the fifties, expansion and modernization works were carried out on the entire airport infrastructure, which then led to the resumption of military activities and the inauguration of the first civil flights: always in that period, starting from 1959 the airport became the final seat of the 4th Wing (aerobrigata founded in 1931 at the Udine-Campoformido airport), while on 1 June 1961 the 9th Fighter Group of Italian Air Force.

== Facilities ==
The airport resides at an elevation of 15 feet (5 m) above mean sea level. It has two asphalt paved runways: 03L/21R measuring 2,994 by 45 metres (9,823 ft × 148 ft) and 03R/21L measuring 2,356 by 24 metres (7,730 ft × 79 ft).

== Airlines and destinations ==
Effective 30 August 2018, there are no regular passenger flights to/from Grosseto Airport. Before its subsequent bankruptcy, SkyWork Airlines operated flights to Bern, sometimes via Elba, as well as London City Airport via Bern.
