= Ben Gardane Airfield =

World War II military airfield in Tunisia

Ben Gardane Airfield
- Part of Ninth Air Force
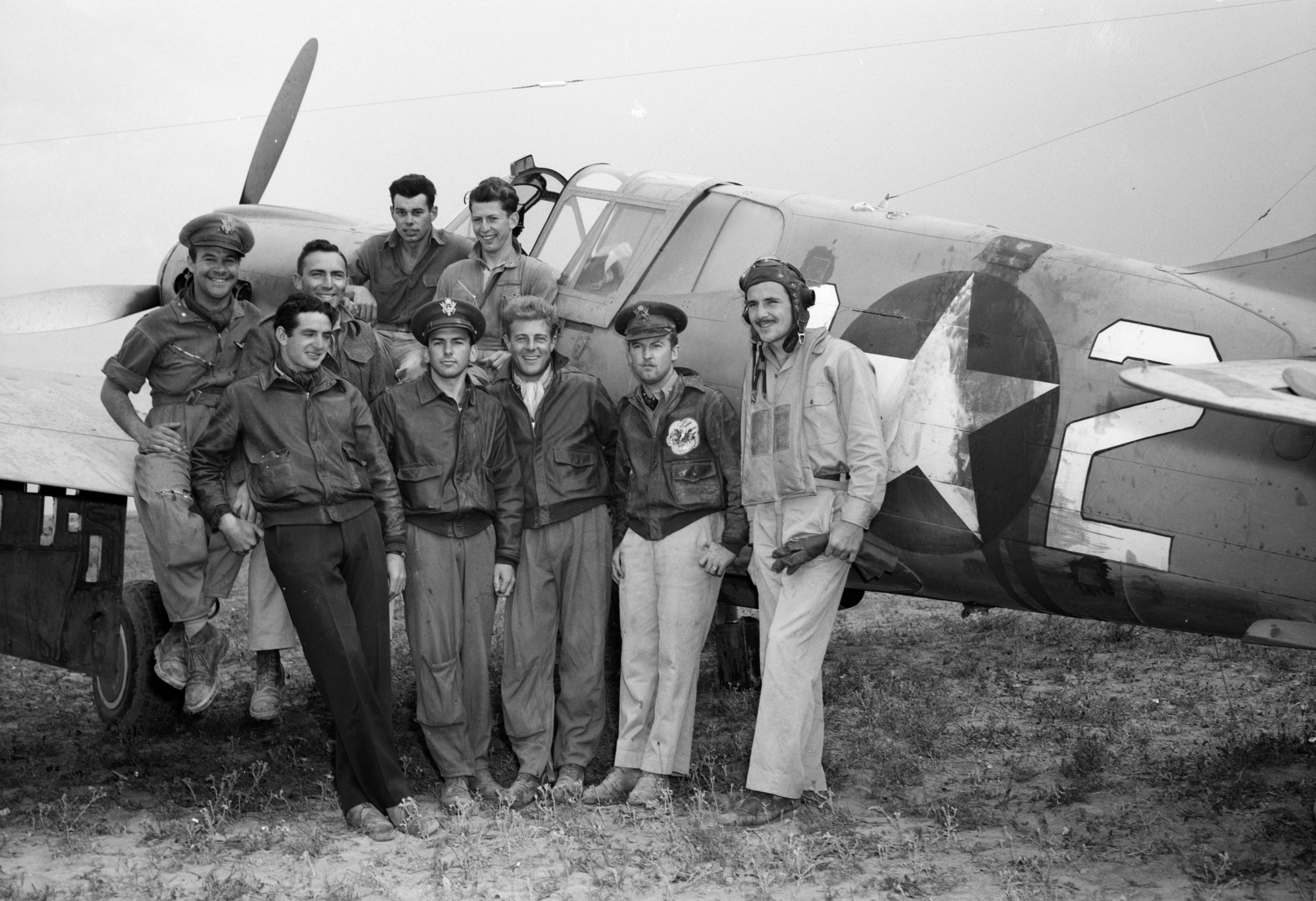
- Pilots of the 57th Fighter Group (April 1943)

Site information
- Type: Military Airfield
- Controlled by: United States Army Air Forces

Location
- Coordinates: 33°08′23.72″N 011°12′50.01″E

Site history
- Built: 1943
- In use: 1943

Location of Ben Gardane Airfield, Tunisia

Ben Gardane Airfield is an abandoned World War II military airfield in Tunisia, near Bin Qirdan (Madanin), about 420 km south-southeast of Tunis.

It was a temporary airfield built by the United States Army Corps of Engineers, used by the United States Army Air Force Ninth Air Force during the Tunisian Campaign. It was used by the 57th Fighter Group, which flew P-40 Warhawks from the airfield between 9 and 21 March 1943 during the British Eighth Army's advance into Tunisia from Libya, to which the 57th was attached. It was also used to land spitfires from the 601st squadron RAF.

When the Americans moved out at the end of April 1943, the airfield was dismantled and abandoned. Today the airfield's precise location is undetermined, as agricultural fields have obliterated its existence.
