= Ras Lanuf Airport =

Libyan airport on the Mediterranean coast

- IATA: none; ICAO: HLNF

Summary
- Airport type: Private
- Serves: Ras Lanuf, Libya
- Elevation AMSL: 42 ft / 13 m
- Coordinates: 30°30′00″N 18°31′35″E

Map
- Location of the airport in Libya

Runways
Direction	Length		Surface
Direction	m	ft	Surface
12/30	1,100	3,609	Asphalt
18/36	1,925	6,316	Asphalt
- Sources: GCM Google Maps

Ras Lanuf Oil Airport (ICAO: HLNF) is an airport in the Sirte District of Libya, located on the Mediterranean coast 227 kilometres (141 mi) south-southwest of Benghazi. Its primary use is the transportation of oilfield workers from production facilities in the area.

The Ras Lanuf V40 non-directional beacon (Ident: VR) is located on the field.

== World War II ==
During World War II the airfield, then known as Hamraiet Airfield was used as a military airfield by the United States Army Air Force Ninth Air Force 57th Fighter Group during the North African Campaign against Axis forces. The 57th flew P-40 Warhawks from the airfield between 3–19 January 1943 before moving forward with the British Eighth Army.

== See also ==
- Transport in Libya
- List of airports in Libya
