= Bagnoli Airfield =

Abandoned World War II military airfield

Bagnoli Airfield
- Part of Twelfth Air Force

Site information
- Type: Military Airfield
- Controlled by: United States Army Air Forces

Location
- Coordinates: 45°11′51.25″N 011°52′10.42″E

Site history
- Built: 1944
- In use: 1944

Location of Bagnoli Airfield, Italy

Bagnoli Airfield is an abandoned World War II military airfield in northeast Italy, which is located approximately 4 km south of Conselve in the Province of Padua in the Italian region of Veneto.

It was an all-weather temporary field built by the United States Army Air Force XII Engineer Command using a graded earth compacted surface, with a prefabricated hessian (burlap) surfacing known as PHS. PHS was made of an asphalt-impregnated jute which was rolled out over the compacted surface over a square mesh track (SMT) grid of wire joined in 3-inch squares. Pierced Steel Planking was also used for parking areas, as well as for dispersal sites, when it was available. In addition, tents were used for billeting and also for support facilities; an access road was built to the existing road infrastructure; a dump for supplies, ammunition, and gasoline drums, along with a drinkable water and minimal electrical grid for communications and station lighting.

Once completed it was turned over for use by the Twelfth Air Force 57th Fighter Group during 15 July-5 August 1945, flying combat operations with P-40 Warhawks.

When the 57th moved out the airfield was closed. Today, the main runway is visible in aerial photography.
