= 547th Intelligence Squadron =

- Active: 1944–1946, 1969-1975; 1991 – present
- Country: United States
- Branch: United States Air Force
- Type: Squadron
- Role: Intelligence
- Part of: Air Combat Command
- Garrison/HQ: Nellis Air Force Base, Nevada
- Motto(s): Hit my Smoke (1969-1975)
- Engagements: World War II Asiatic-Pacific Theatre

- Decorations: Air Force Outstanding Unit Award (6x); Philippines Presidential Unit Citation

Insignia
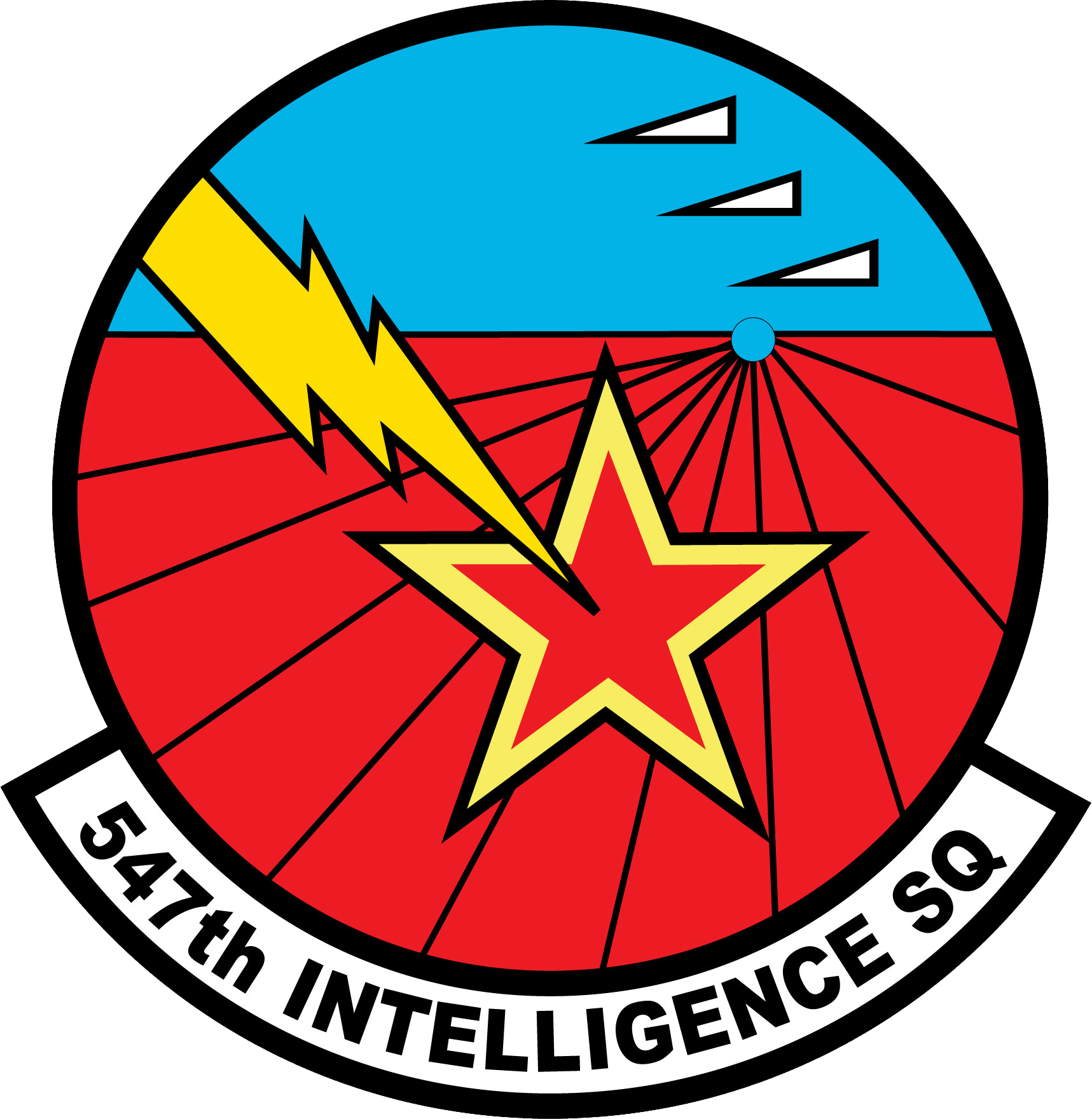
- 547th Intelligence Squadron emblem

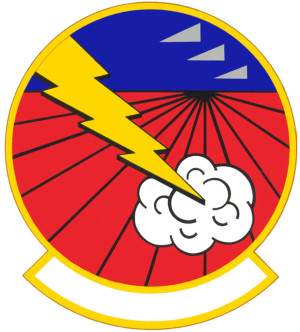
- 547th Intelligence Squadron emblem (approved 14 July 1972)

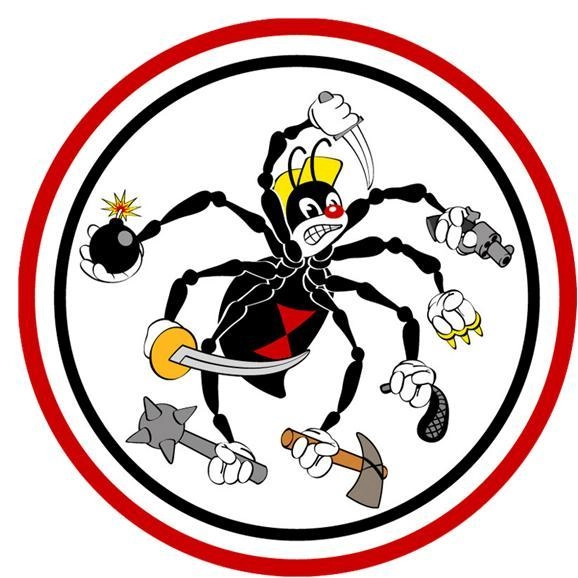
- 547th Night Fighter Squadron emblem

The 547th Intelligence Squadron is an active United States Air Force (USAF) unit. It is assigned to the 365th Intelligence, Surveillance and Reconnaissance Group, stationed at Nellis Air Force Base, Nevada. The squadron serves as the USAFs center for adversary tactics analysis; develops intelligence threat training programs; defines potential threats to the US, provides intelligence support to Air Combat Command's test and evaluation programs and live-fly exercises.

The unit was originally formed as the 547th Night Fighter Squadron in 1944. After training, it was deployed to Fifth Air Force and ordered to New Guinea to provide air defense interceptor protection against Japanese night air raids on Army Air Forces airfields. It later served in the Philippines Campaign where in addition to night interceptor missions it also flew day and night interdiction missions against enemy troop movements, bridges and other targets of opportunity. It later served in Okinawa and Occupied Japan and where it was inactivated in 1946.

The squadron was reactivated during the Vietnam War as a training unit of the 1st Special Operations Wing, providing training in unconventional warfare, counter-insurgency, psychological warfare, and civic actions. It began its current mission in 1991 assuming the activities of the 4513th Adversary Threat Training Group.

== Mission ==
The 547th compiles, writes and edits the Air Force Tactics, Techniques, and Procedures 3-1. Threat Guide, "Threat Reference Guide" and Air Combat Command Threat To Aerospace Operations manuals. It also analyzes, refines and disseminates intelligence products on adversary air, air defense, electronic warfare, cyber and space tactics and weapons employment for customers throughout the Department of Defense.

It is a charter member of the Emerging Threat Tactics Team and hosts the Special Tactics Analysis Team; sponsors and hosts the Nellis Air Tactics Working Group; provides intelligence to Air Combat Command's wings and squadrons; and also provides intelligence support to the 57th Adversary Tactics Group, 57th Wing, 99th Air Base Wing and United States Air Force Warfare Center. In addition, the 547th provides all-source intelligence for Air Combat Command's Exercise Red Flag.

== History ==
=== World War II ===
The squadron was established on 1 March 1944 as the 547th Night Fighter Squadron at Hammer Field, California. It was the first of the final group of dedicated night fighter interceptor squadrons formed by the Army Air Forces, being programmed to deploy to the Southwest Pacific. It was also the first night fighter squadron to be formed in California, as all previous units had been formed in Florida before training was transferred to Fourth Air Force in January 1944. The 547th was also the first night fighter squadron to be fully trained using the Northrop P-61 Black Widow. It trained at various airfields in the San Joaquin Valley and was ready to deploy into combat by August.

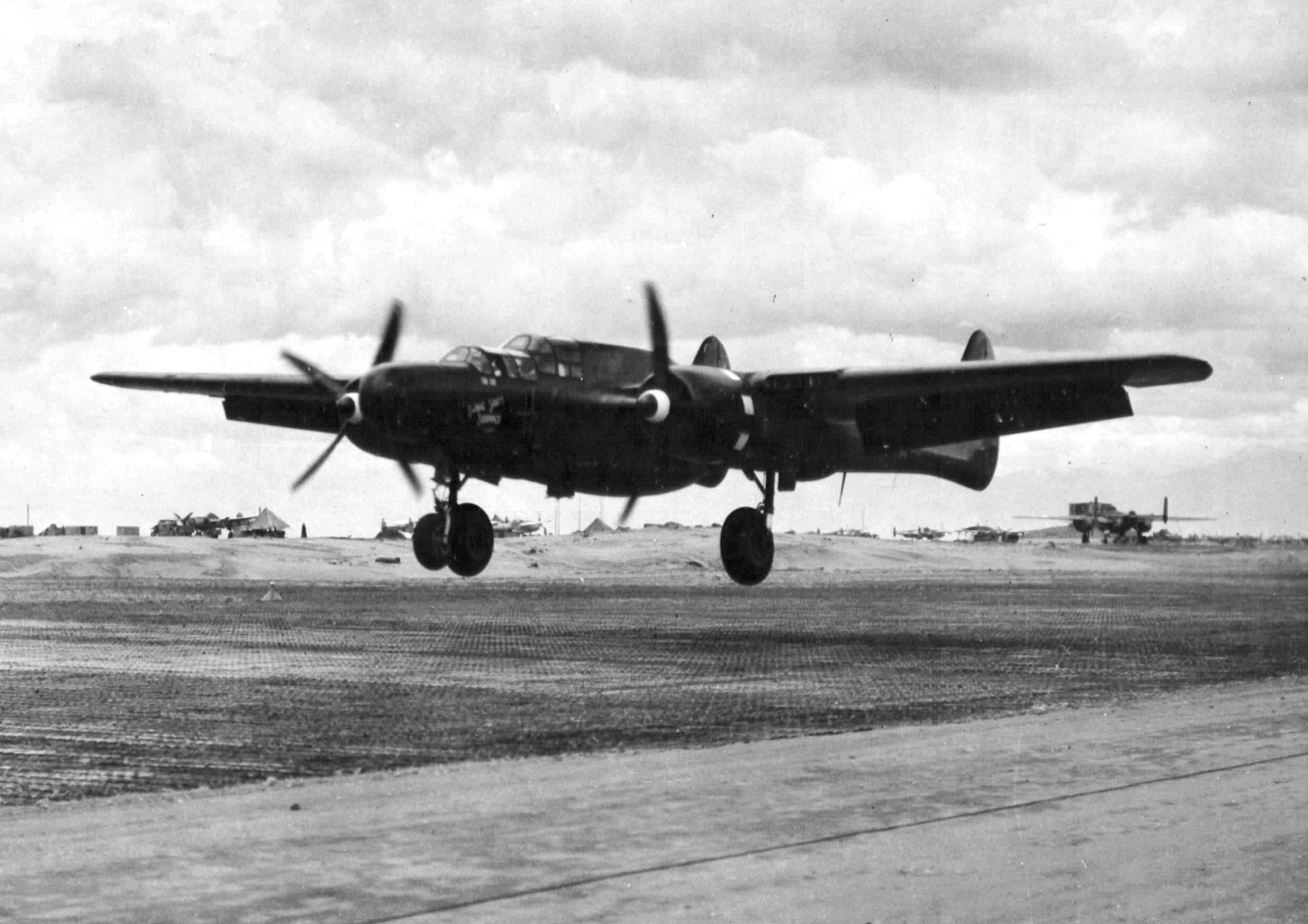
P-61B Black Widow from the 547th Night Fighter Squadron landing on Lingayen airstrip on 17 May 1945

The squadron deployed to Fifth Air Force, and arrived at Owi Airfield in the Netherlands East Indies. Arriving in late August, the squadron was equipped with modified Lockheed P-38 Lightnings used as night fighters without radar. However, the P-38s were replaced when its P-61 aircraft arrived in September. The 547th would be a key player in the battles both prior to and as part of the Philippines Campaign to regain the islands from the Japanese. In order to effectively cover United States airfields from Japanese night attacks over such a large area, the squadron was broken up into several detachments of two or three planes away from the squadron's main headquarters.

The primary target for the squadron was the Mitsubishi G4M "Betty" bomber, which the Japanese used to attack American bases after dark with almost total impunity prior to the introduction of the Black Widow. The Japanese had improved the performance of the Betty in 1943 with new supercharged engines that gave it a speed in excess of over 300 mph and a higher ceiling. Unlike the P-38s, the P-61s of the squadron were able to reach any altitude that the Japanese were operating at, which surprised the enemy aircrews as on many interceptions the Japanese continued to fly straight and level, with no evasive action.

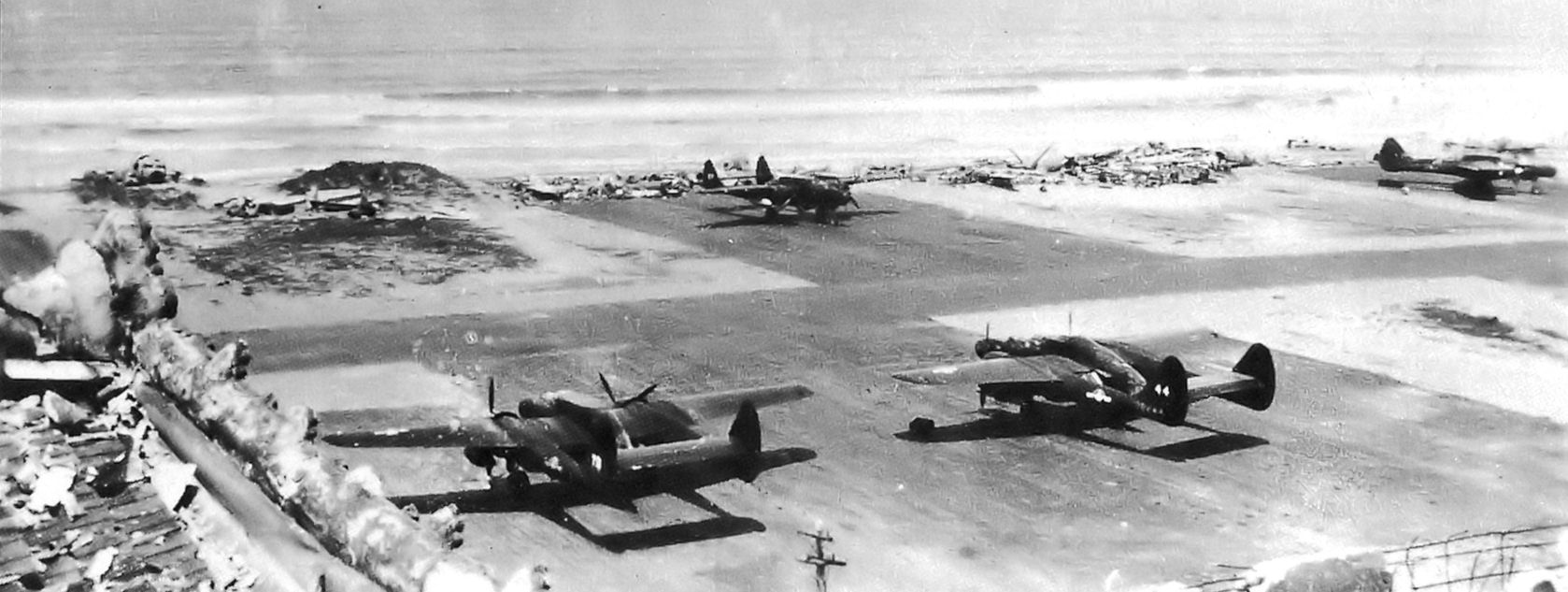
547th Night Fighter Squadron ramp at Lingayen Field.

After operating in the Netherlands East Indies during the balance of 1944, in January 1945 the squadron moved to the new American airfield at Lingayen Gulf on Luzon in the Philippines. Due to the overwhelming superiority of Allied day fighters in the Philippines, the Japanese were forced to conduct operations during the hours of darkness. The squadron, with its radar equipped Black Widow and also ground intercept radar stations, effectively swept the Japanese planes from the night skies. At Lingayen Field, the aircraft were modified in the field to add the capability to carry external ordnance, such as bombs, napalm canisters and ground-to-air rockets. With these modifications, night interdiction raids were carried out on Japanese airfields where it could both strafe the field and also drop ordnance on buildings and other facilities.

The squadron continued operations in the Philippines until the end of operations there, moving to Ie Shima Airfield near Okinawa in preparation for the planned American invasion of Japan in August. However, with the Atomic Bomb attacks on Japan the war ended and it moved to Atsugi Airfield near Tokyo in October as part of the occupation forces on Honshu. It remained there until February 1946 when the squadron was inactivated.

=== Vietnam War ===
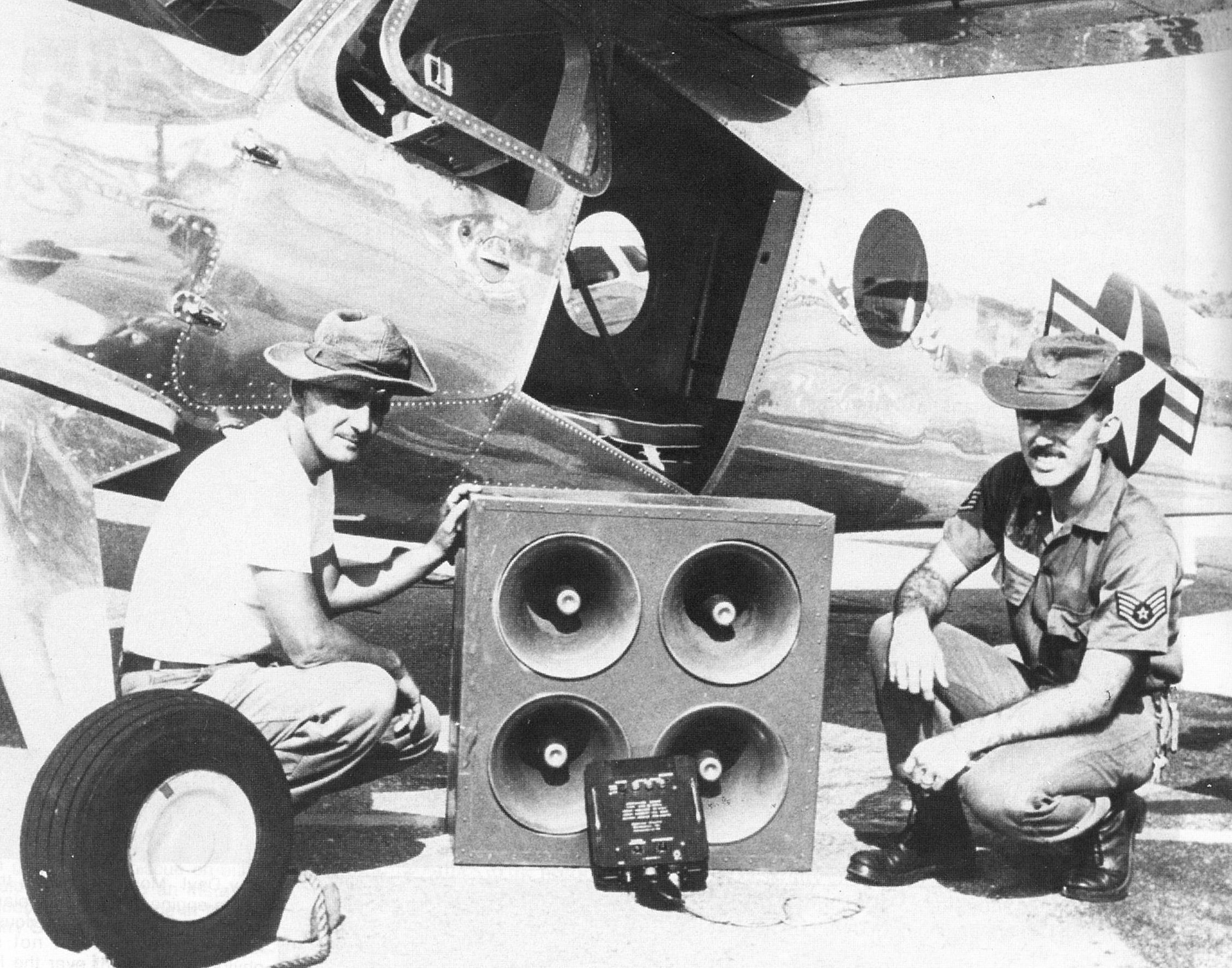
547th Special Operations Training Squadron Air Commandos display a loudspeaker setup for a U-10 Helio Courier aircraft

The squadron was reactivated in 1969 as part of the 1st Special Operations Wing at Hurlburt Field, Florida during the Vietnam War. The squadron was a training unit for USAF and Republic of Vietnam Air Force special operations pilots.

Its initial mission was the training of pilots in psychological warfare against the Vietnamese Communist forces. This would include broadcasting of messages in Vietnamese from observation aircraft equipped with loudspeakers flying at low altitudes over communist controlled areas and leaflet dropping missions.

At Hurlburt Field, the squadron was equipped with several light aircraft, including the Helio U-10 Courier single-engine utility aircraft. The training was for missions that would be difficult and dangerous, as the communists were ultra-sensitive to them, with the aircraft almost always drawing ground fire by flying at low altitudes. From overhead, the aircraft would drop leaflets and broadcast messages through loudspeakers. After each American offensive action, the special operations pilots would fly over the area and broadcast funeral dirges and wailing sounds to play on the communists superstitions. It was not infrequent that the pilots would fly over an area and find themselves in the middle of a battle still in progress.

The effectiveness of the training and subsequent operations could be judged by the fact that the communists frequently shot at the psychological warfare aircraft more than any other, with the exception of the Fairchild UC-123 Provider defoliation aircraft. They would bang pots and pans together in hamlet streets to drown out the speakers, and cut off the hands of villagers reading leaflets.

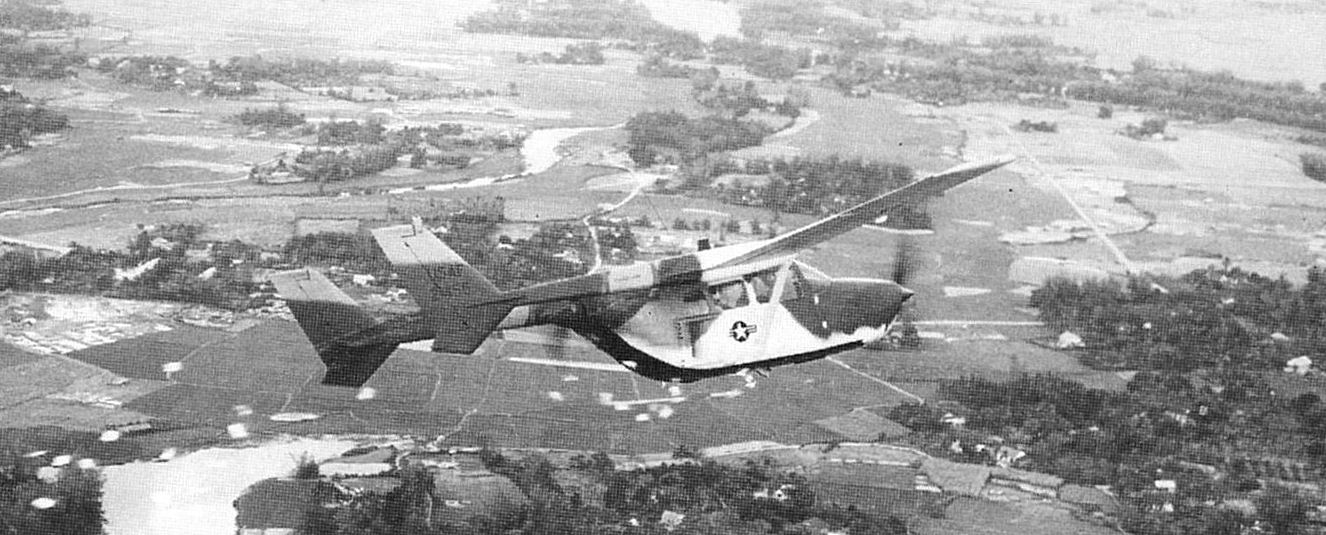
A O-2B Super Skymaster aircraft over South Vietnam dropping surrender leaflets.

Beginning in the summer of 1972, it began training USAF and South Vietnamese forward air controllers (FAC) to direct tactical fighters in attacks on communist forces in addition to the psychological warfare mission. It employed the Cessna O-1 Bird Dog and Cessna O-2 Skymaster aircraft. Visual reconnaissance formed the core FAC mission during the Vietnam War, as the FAC flew light aircraft slowly over the rough terrain at low altitude to maintain constant aerial surveillance. The rugged jungle terrain of South Vietnam readily hid enemy troop movements, and the jet fighter-bombers flew so fast that pilots had great difficulty in distinguishing between enemy troops, friendly troops, and civilians. Forward air controllers directed the air strikes thus became essential in usage of air power. By patrolling the same area constantly, the FACs grew very familiar with the terrain, and they learned to detect any changes that could indicate enemy forces hiding below, and frequently drew ground fire from the communist forces.

The squadron ended its training activities in the spring of 1975 with the end of American involvement in the Vietnam War and as part of the general inactivation of USAF special forces units.

== Lineage ==
- Constituted as the 547th Night Fighter Squadron on 18 February 1944

Activated on 1 March 1944
Inactivated on 20 February 1946

- Redesignated 547th Special Operations Training Squadron on 22 August 1969

Activated on 15 October 1969
Redesignated 547th Tactical Air Support Training Squadron on 15 August 1972
Inactivated on 30 April 1975

- Redesignated 547th Adversary Threat Squadron and activated on 1 November 1991

Redesignated 547th Intelligence Squadron on 1 July 1994

=== Assignments ===
- 481st Night Fighter Operational Training Group, 1 March 1944
- IV Fighter Command, 31 March 1944
- Fifth Air Force, 4 September 1944
- V Fighter Command, 30 September 1944
- 86th Fighter Wing, 10 October 1944 (attached to: V Fighter Command, until November 1944; 310th Bombardment Wing, 5–16 January 1945; 308th Bombardment Wing, 16 January–February 1945
- V Fighter Command, 15 May 1945 – 20 February 1946 (attached to: 310th Bombardment Wing, 22 October-10 November 1945; V Bomber Command, 10 November 1945 – 20 February 1946)
- 1st Special Operations Wing (later 834th Tactical Composite Wing), 15 October 1969 – 30 April 1975
- 57th Operations Group, 1 November 1991
- 57th Adversary Tactics Group, 15 Sep 2005
- 365th Intelligence, Surveillance and Reconnaissance Group, 2014–present

=== Stations ===
- Hammer Field, California, 1 March 1944
- Visalia Army Air Field, California, 31 May–5 August 1944,
- Oro Bay Airfield, New Guinea, 5 September–6 October 1944
- Owi Airfield, Schouten Islands, Netherlands East Indies, 6 October – 31 December 1944

Detachment: Tacloban Airfield, Leyte, Philippines], 9 November 1944 – 11 January 1945
Detachment: McGuire Field, Mindoro, Philippines, December 1944 – 16 January 1945

- Lingayen Airfield, Luzon, Philippines, 18 January – 13 August 1945
- Ie Shima Airfield, 13 August 1945
- Atsugi Airfield, Japan, 7 October 1945 – 20 February 1946
- Holley Field (AF auxiliary field at Hurlburt Fld)], FL, 15 Oct 1969
- Eglin Air Force Auxiliary Field No. 9 (Hurlburt Fld), Florida, 8 Sep 1973 – 30 Apr 1975
- Nellis Air Force Base, Nevada, 1 Nov 1991 – present

=== Aircraft ===
- Lockheed P-38 Lightning, 1944
- Northrop P-61 Black Widow, 1944–1945
- Douglas P-70 Havoc, 1944
- Helio U-10 Courier, 1969-1970
- Cessna O-1 Bird Dog, 1969-1971
- Cessna O-2 Skymaster, 1969-1975

== See also ==
- 481st Night Fighter Operational Training Group
