= 57th Adversary Tactics Group =

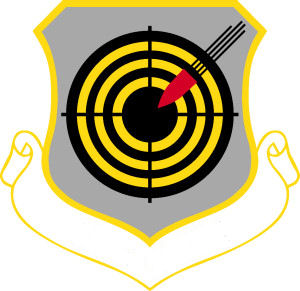
- Active: 2005–31 March 2020
- Country: United States
- Branch: United States Air Force
- Type: Aggressor Training
- Garrison/HQ: Nellis Air Force Base

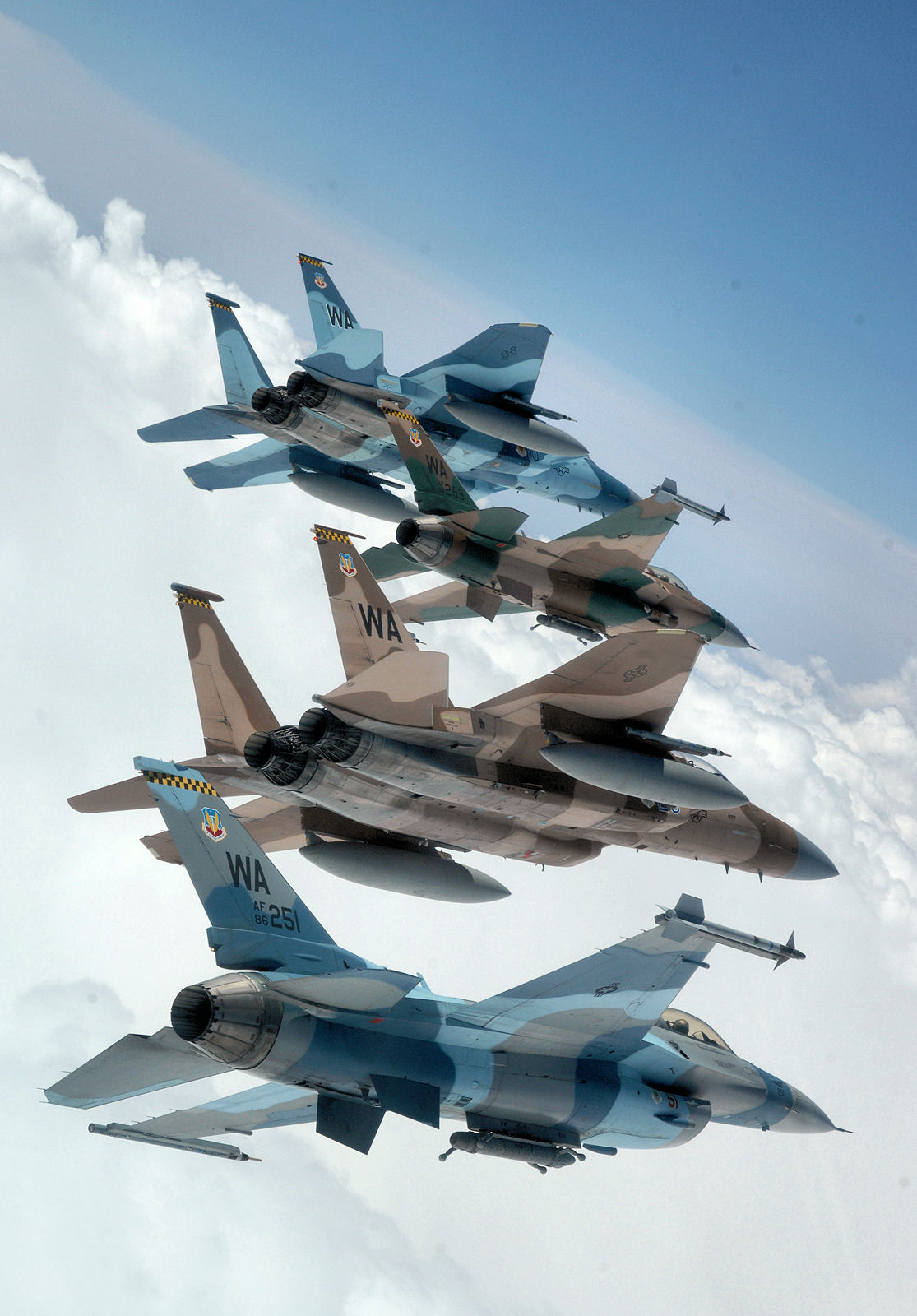
A flight of Aggressor F-15 Eagles and F-16 Fighting Falcons fly in formation over the Nevada Test and Training Ranges on 5 June 2008. The jets are assigned to the 64th and 65th Aggressor Squadrons at Nellis Air Force Base, Nevada

The 57th Adversary Tactics Group (57 ATG) was the flying component of the 57th Wing, assigned to the United States Air Force Air Combat Command. The group was stationed at Nellis Air Force Base, Nevada, prior to being merged with the 57th Operations Group on 31 March 2020.

== Overview ==
The 57th ATG was formed on 1 July 2005 with the objective of consolidating all Aggressor activities under one organization to provide the Combat Air Forces with the opportunity to train against a realistic, fully integrated threat array during large- and small-scale exercises such as Red Flag – Nellis, Red Flag – Alaska, Maple Flag, Green Flag and dissimilar air combat training deployments.

The official USAF Aggressor program was born in 1972 as a response to the poor aerial combat performance of U.S. Air Force aircrews in Vietnam. The Aggressors' charter remains to this day to improve combat performance through realistic, challenging training and education. They accomplish this as the USAF's professional adversaries, flying F-15 and F-16 aircraft for Red Flag and Maple Flag exercises, USAF Weapons School syllabus support, priority test mission support and road shows that visit various units throughout the CAF.

The group was merged with the 57th Operations Group on 31 March 2020.

== Units ==
Established in July 2005, the 57th ATG (tail code: WA) consisted of Aggressor squadrons that replicate adversary threat tactics while training combat air forces aircrews.

- 57th Adversary Tactics Support Squadron
- 57th Information Aggressor Squadron
- 64th Aggressor Squadron
- 65th Aggressor Squadron
- 177th Information Aggressor Squadron
- 507th Air Defense Aggressor Squadron
- 547th Intelligence Squadron

== History ==
See Also 4477th Tactical Evaluation Flight

Replaced the Aggressor flying components of the 57th Operations Group, placing them all under a single organization. Has trained combat aircrews in adversary threat tactics since its inception.

=== Lineage ===
- Established as 57th Adversary Tactics Group on 31 Aug 2005

Activated on 15 Sep 2005
Inactivated on 31 March 2020.

=== Assignments ===
- 57th Wing, 15 Sep 2005 – 31 March 2020

=== Components ===
- 64th Aggressor Squadron: 15 Sep 2005 – 31 March 2020
- 65th Aggressor Squadron: 15 Sep 2005 – 26 September 2014
- 527th Space Aggressor Squadron: 14 Apr 2006 – 31 March 2020
- 547th Intelligence Squadron, 15 Sep 2005–2014
- 57th Adversary Tactics Support Squadron, 15 Sep 2005 – 31 March 2020

=== Stations ===
- Nellis AFB, NV, 15 Sep 2005 – 31 March 2020

=== Aircraft ===
- F-15 Eagle, 2005–2014
- F-16 Fighting Falcon, 2006–31 March 2020
