= Nellis Air Force Base =

USAF base in Clark County, Nevada

- Las Vegas, Nevada in the United States of America
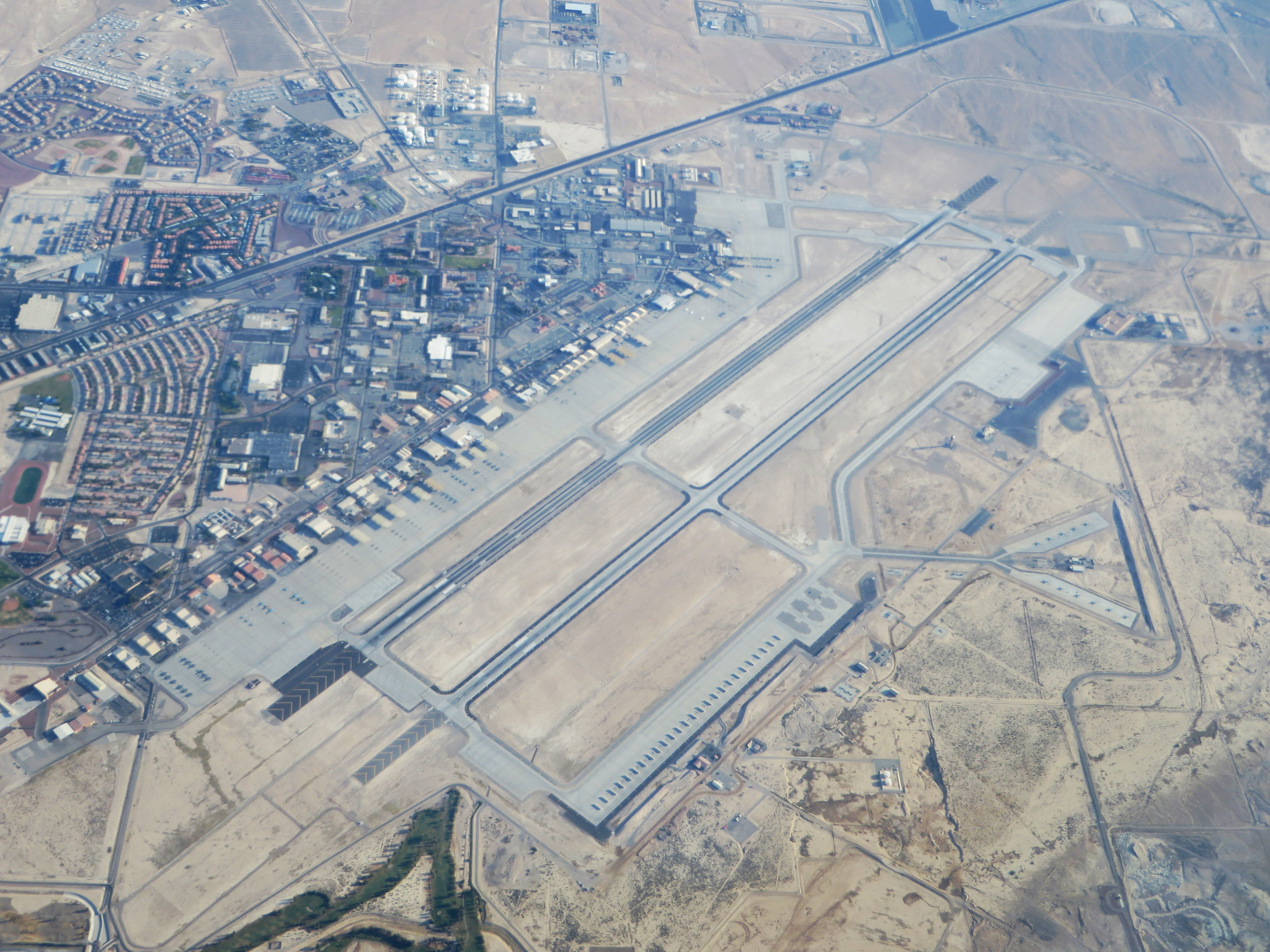
- An aerial view of Nellis AFB taken in 2014

Site information
- Type: US Air Force base
- Owner: Department of Defense
- Operator: United States Air Force
- Controlled by: Air Combat Command (ACC)
- Open to the public: Yes, with restrictions (Thunderbirds Museum and tours)
- Condition: Operational
- Website: Official website

Location
- Location in the United States
- Coordinates: 36°14′57″N 114°59′46″W
- Area: 4,600 ha (11,300 acres)

Site history
- Built: 1941 (as Las Vegas Army Airfield)
- In use: 1941 – present

Garrison information
- Current commander: Colonel Joshua DeMotts
- Garrison: 99th Air Base Wing (Host)
- Occupants: United States Air Force Warfare Center; 53rd Test and Evaluation Group; 57th Wing; 365th Intelligence, Surveillance and Reconnaissance Group; 505th Command and Control Wing; 563rd Rescue Group; 926th Wing; 820th RED HORSE Squadron; Joint Center for Electromagnetic Readiness; Nevada Test and Training Range; United States Air Force Thunderbirds

Airfield information
- Identifiers: IATA: LSV, ICAO: KLSV, FAA LID: LSV, WMO: 723865
- Elevation: 569.6 metres (1,869 ft) AMSL
Runways
Direction	Length and surface
03L/21R	3,084.5 metres (10,120 ft) concrete
03R/21L	3,063.5 metres (10,051 ft) concrete

Nellis Air Force Base ("Nellis" colloq.) is a United States Air Force installation in southern Nevada. Nellis hosts air combat exercises such as Exercise Red Flag and close air support exercises such as Green Flag-West flown in "Military Operations Area (MOA) airspace", associated with the nearby Nevada Test and Training Range (NTTR). The base also has the Combined Air and Space Operations Center-Nellis.

== History ==
After World War I, Nevada and other western inland states were surveyed by Capt. Lowell H. Smith and Sgt. William B. Whitefield for landing sites, and by "mid-1925 the Air Service possessed information on nearly thirty-five hundred landing places, including more than twenty-eight hundred emergency landing areas, in the United States." The 1929 airfield (dirt runway, water well, and small operations shack) north of Las Vegas—operated by the 1925 Western Air Express for Contract Air Mail (CAM) Route #4, LA-to-SLC—was used by the Army Air Corps in the 1930s for training flights. After the Invasion of Poland in 1939, the "western site board" had located a southern Nevada area "near Tonopah, Nev" by April 1940 for a military range, and in October 1940, Air Corps Major David Schlatter surveyed the southwest United States for a military airfield. "The 60 × 90 mile area at Tonopah was transferred to the War Department on 29 October 1940" by Executive Order 8578.

=== Western Air Express Field / McCarran Field ===
Following "difficulties in securing the use" of the airfield north of Las Vegas for a Nevada World War II Army Airfield., the City of Las Vegas purchased Western Air Express Field, unofficially "Las Vegas Airport," on 2 January 1941, splitting it for Army and civilian use. Part of the field was renamed McCarran Field, becoming the city's municipal airport, and the other portion of the field was leased to the Army on 5 January. It was "signed over" to the Quartermaster Corps on 25 January, and Army construction began in March 1941. The city's Federal Building became the May 1941 location of the 79th Air Base Group detachment (5 staff officers commanded by Lt. Col. Martinus Stenseth), and a month later 5 administrative NCOs plus other support personnel arrived. WPA barracks in Las Vegas were used for enlisted men, and the motor pool with 6 vintage trucks and a semi-trailer was next to the WPA barracks. Vehicle parts were from local service stations and gasoline and oil from the Civilian Conservation Corps (the Block 16 brothels in Las Vegas were closed). Permanent construction for barracks to house 3,000 people began in mid-1941, and by 7 December, 10 AT-6 Texan advanced flight trainers and 17 Martin B-10 bombers were at the airfield.

=== Las Vegas Army Airfield ===
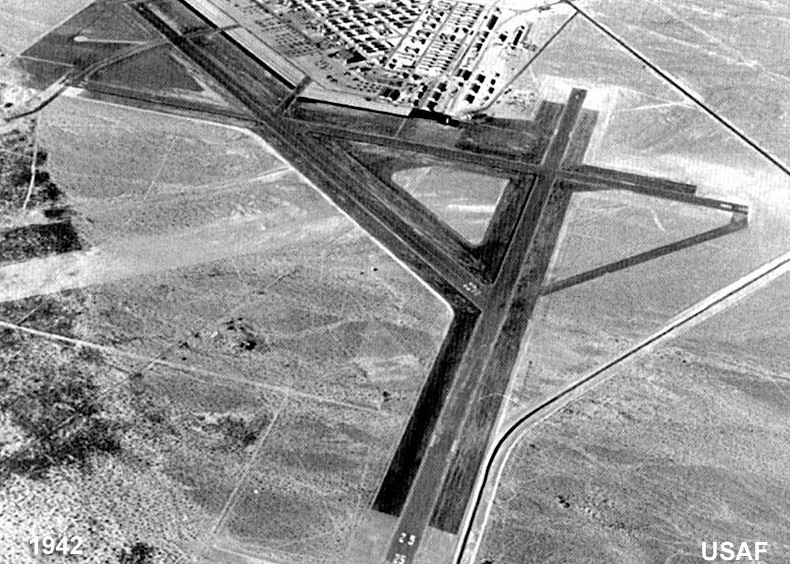
The Las Vegas Army Airfield had three runways in 1942, the year Tonopah Army Airfield opened in August (the Tonopah Bombing Range had been divided in 1941 into the Tonopah and Las Vegas General Ranges).

Las Vegas Army Airfield was both activated and began flying training on 20 December 1941. Gunnery training began in January 1942, with guntruck platforms being used in January and February. Many pieces of the destroyed aerial drone targets litter the hillside north of the gunnery range, and can be seen in town when the sun reflects off them.

The first B-17 Flying Fortresses arrived in 1942 and allowed training of 600 gunnery students and 215 co-pilots from the field every five weeks at the height of the war. More than 45,000 B-17 gunners were trained; the USAAF training movie The Rear Gunner was filmed at the airfield in 1943. The 82d Flying Training Wing (Flexible Gunnery) was activated at the base as one of ten Army Air Forces Flying Training Command wings on 23 August 1943. By 1944, gunnery students utilized B-17, B-24 Liberator and B-40 Flying Fortress gunship aircraft (for example by firing at aircraft-towed targets).

In March 1945, the base switched to B-29 gunnery training which included the manipulation trainer on the ground with camera guns. The subsequent population peaked with nearly 11,000 officers and enlisted personnel including more than 4,700 students. Flexible gunnery training ended in September 1945, and the base became a demobilization center for soldiers' separation physicals and final pay. A course of navigator, bombardier, and radar operator training planned for LVAAF was instead begun at Mather Army Airfield in June 1946. AAF Training Command closed LVAAF which went on caretaker status 28 August 1946 ("officially deactivated in January 1947"). During the planning for a separate air force, the Las Vegas AAF was reactivated "30 Aug 47 as a subinstallation of Mather", and it transferred to the USAF after the branch was created in September.

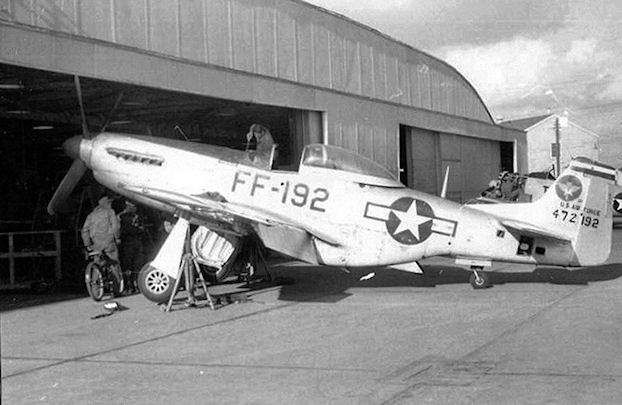
3595th PTW F-51D c. 1950 at a Nellis hangar

=== Las Vegas Air Force Base ===
Renamed Las Vegas Air Force Base on 13 January 1948 and assigned as a subinstallation of Williams AFB on 1 April, the 3595th Pilot Training Wing (Advanced Single-Engine) was established on 22 December 1948. Training began at Las Vegas AFB on 1 March 1949 with 5 squadrons using P-51 Mustangs for a 6-month course, with 3,000 USAF pilots trained by 1950. The 3525th Aircraft Gunnery Squadron activated on 11 February 1949, the base hosted the 1st USAF Gunnery Meet on 2 May, and ATC (air traffic control) opened its LVAFB Aircraft Gunnery School on 15 May 1949.

=== Nellis AFB ===
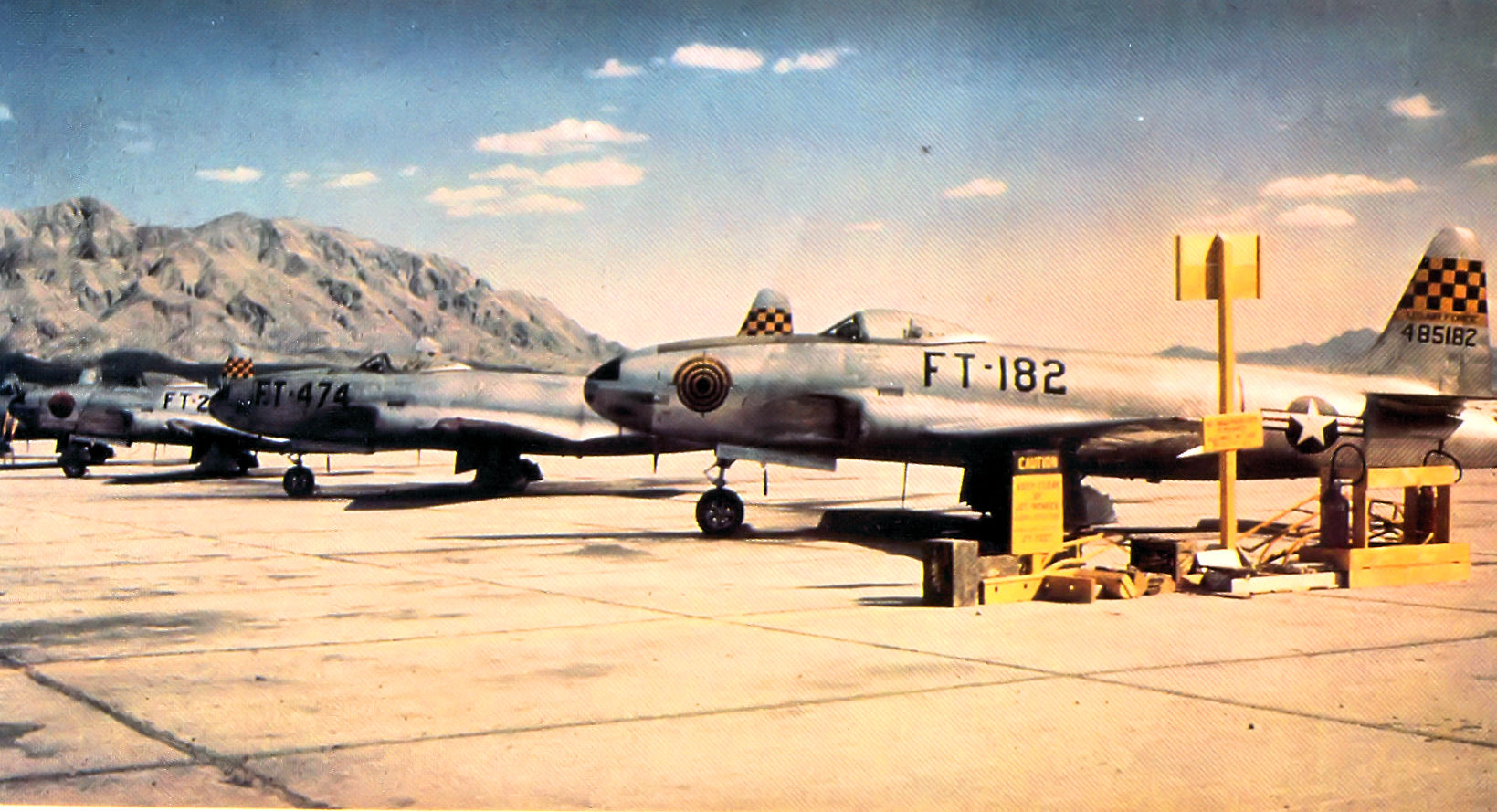
Fighter Weapons School F-80As c. 1950 in front of Frenchman Mountain, which is east of the valley

Nellis Air Force Base was named on 30 April 1950, and the 20 May 1950 dedication was attended by William Harrell Nellis's family. By 1 July the Air Force had directed ATC to accelerate Korean War training for a new 95-wing Air Force. The first school opened at Nellis, and ATC redesignated the 3595th Pilot Training Wing (Advanced Single-Engine) as the 3595th Training Wing (Combat Crew). On 17 July 1950, Nellis began a replacement pilot training program to provide 115 FEAF F-51 Mustang pilots and 92 combat-ready F-80 Shooting Star pilots. Nellis' advanced single-engine pilot training transferred to Alabama on 1 September 1950. Nellis assumed fighter-bomber training, and ATC established its USAF Air Crew School (Fighter) on 14 November 1950, equipped with F-80s and early-model F-84C Thunderjets. On 1 October, Nellis AFB base management functions transferred from Williams AFB. In early 1951, ATC assigned recently graduated airplane and engine mechanics to Nellis to learn jet aircraft maintenance. The airfield was expanded 1951–1954 with longer jet-capable runways, reconfigured taxiways and a larger aircraft parking ramp; and World War II wooden structures were replaced with concrete and steel structures (e.g., barracks and base housing for married personnel). The first Wherry houses were completed in 1954, with updated Capehart houses being completed in February 1960.

==== USAF Fighter Weapons School ====
The USAF Fighter Weapons School was designated on 1 January 1954 from the squadron when the Air Crew School graduated its last Combat Crew Training Class (the primary Weapons School mission was gunnery instructor training). In the mid-1950s for Operation Teapot nuclear testing, 1 of the 12 Zone Commanders was based at Nellis AFB for community liaison/public relations (weapons for other atomic tests were stored at Nellis). Air Training Command suspended training at the Nellis fighter weapons school in late 1956 because of the almost total failure of the F-86 Sabre aircraft used at Nellis, and during 1958 ATC discontinued its Flying Training and Technical Training.

==== Tactical Air Command ====
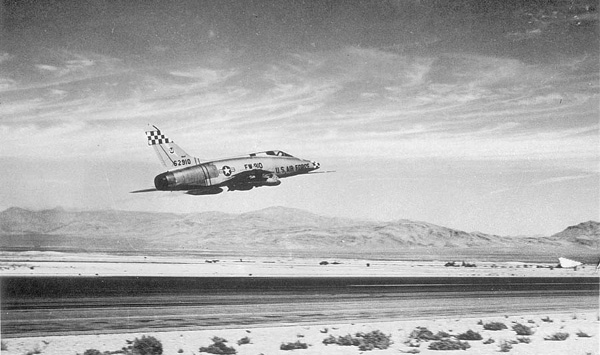
An F-100D Super Sabre fighter jet (s/n 56-2910) taking off from Nellis, circa 1959

Nellis AFB transferred to Tactical Air Command on 1 February 1958, and the Nellis mission transitioned from initial aircraft qualification and gunnery training to advanced, graduate-level weapons training. Soon after the transfer to TAC, the F-100C, F-100D, and tandem cockpit F-100F entered the school inventory. On 21 April 1958 an F-100F on a training flight out of Nellis was involved in a mid-air collision with United Airlines Flight 736. All 47 aboard the airliner and both Air Force pilots in the fighter jet were killed. The 3595th wing assets were redesignated as the 4520th Combat Crew Training Group by TAC on 1 July 1958.

===== 4520th Combat Crew Training Wing =====
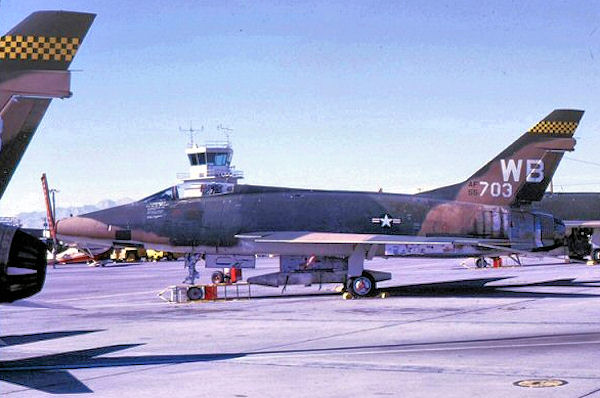
The Nellis control tower behind a 4536th F-100D ("WB" tail code). In July 1968 the first tail codes appeared on Nellis-based aircraft: "WC" (4537th F-105), "WD" (4538th F-4C), & "WF" (4539th F-111).

The 4520th Combat Crew Training Wing was designated from the 4520th CCTG on 1 May 1961, and the Combat Crew training squadrons were renumbered. The 4537th Fighter Weapons Squadron had been assigned F-105D Thunderchiefs in March 1961, and the wing taught veteran pilots in all phases of fighter weapon employment: air-to-air gunnery, rocketry, conventional and nuclear bombing, aerial refueling, and combat navigation. The F-4 Phantom II Instructor Course began in mid-1965 and during the Vietnam War, experienced combat pilots were used as Fighter Weapons instructors at Nellis. On 1 January 1966 the USAF Fighter Weapons School was activated at Nellis with F-100, F-4, and F-105 divisions and on 1 September 1966, Fighter Weapons School elements and the 4520th CCTW merged to activate the 4525th Fighter Weapons Wing.

===== USAF Tactical Fighter Weapons Center =====
The USAF Tactical Fighter Weapons Center activated at Nellis AFB on 1 January 1966 (USAF Warfare Center after 15 November 2005) is the USAF authority for employment of tactical fighter weapons. The center has developed, refined, coordinated, validated and tested fighter concepts, doctrine, tactics, and procedures. The FWC also performed operational test and evaluation and prepared or monitored Air Force publications on employment tactics, aircrew training, and aircrew weapons delivery. It has supervised courses of the US Air Force Fighter Weapons School, adversary tactics training, and Wild Weasel training, and other combat and tactical schools.

The FWC supervised Red Flag operational training and other continuing air exercises, such as Green Flag and Silver Flag Alpha. The center also directed operations of the US Air Force Bomber and Tanker, Employment School since 1992 and the Air Rescue Center since 1993. The USAF Air Demonstration Squadron with the United States Air Force Thunderbirds moved from Arizona to Nellis AFB in June 1956.

===== 474th Tactical Fighter Wing =====
The 474th Tactical Fighter Wing was reassigned from New Mexico to Nellis AFB on 20 January 1968 and was the first USAF operational wing equipped with the General Dynamics F-111—6 of the F-111As departed Nellis for Vietnam on 15 March 1968 (Combat Lancer). Nellis provided replacements for 2 lost F-111s, and the F-111s returned to the USA in November 1968. The wing's 428th Tactical Fighter Squadron reached IOC in spring 1968 with F-111s, and the TFW was fully operational in July 1971. The Lake Mead Base, a 1953–6 United States Navy's weapons storage area of 2,832 ha (6,999 acres), became Area II of the Nellis AFB complex in September 1969.

The 430th TFS returned to the 474th TFW Nellis on 22 March 1973 assuming a replacement training unit mission, while the 428th and 429th were transferred to Mountain Home AFB on 30 July 1973. Post-war the 474th's mission was to train combat-ready force of aircrews and maintained a rapid-reaction capability to execute fighter attacks against enemy forces and facilities in time of crisis. In 1975, the 428th and 429th Tactical Fighter Squadrons were reassigned to the wing with F-111As (transferred to Mountain Home AFB, Idaho, in August 1977) and the 474th Wing absorbed the F-4D Phantom II aircraft, crews, and resources of the inactivating provisional 474th Tactical Fighter Wing at Nellis in April 1977. The wing was inactivated in September 1989, and its F-16As transferred to Air National Guard and Air Force Reserve squadrons.

===== 57th Fighter Weapons Wing =====
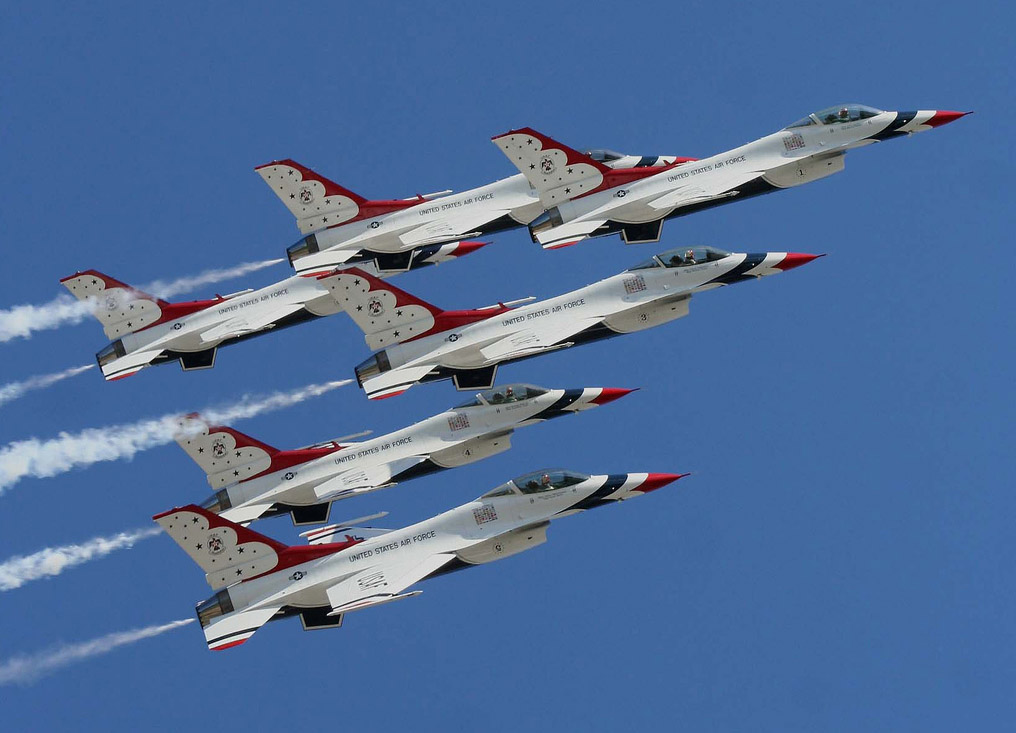
The United States Air Force Thunderbirds

The 57th Fighter Weapons Wing was activated at Nellis on 15 October 1969 to replace the 4525th FWW (its Fighter Weapons Squadrons transferred to the 57th). The USAF Air Demonstration Squadron (the "Thunderbirds") was assigned to the 57th in February 1974, and the wing incorporated intelligence training after March 1980. Redesignated the 57th Tactical Training Wing in 1977, the wing trained tactical fighter aircrews, conducted operational tests and evaluations, demonstrated tactical fighter weapon systems, and developed fighter tactics. The 57th's 4440th Tactical Fighter Training Group (Red Flag) assumed operational control of Red Flag exercises in October 1979; and the 57th developing realistic combat training operations featuring adversary tactics, dissimilar air combat training, and electronic warfare.

Nellis' 4477th Tactical Evaluation Flight ("Red Eagles") operated MiG-17s, MiG-21s and MiG-23s at the Tonopah Test Range Airport (late 1960s-c. 1990) to simulate combat against U.S. combat aircraft. Named Constant Peg in 1980, the operation assessed the Soviet technology and developed adversary tactics for dissimilar air combat training. After completion of training, the Aggressor pilots were assigned to the DACT squadrons, one of which was assigned to Nellis. During the 1970s, a site northwest of Nellis evaluated a Soviet "Barlock" search radar to develop techniques for countering Soviet air defense systems.

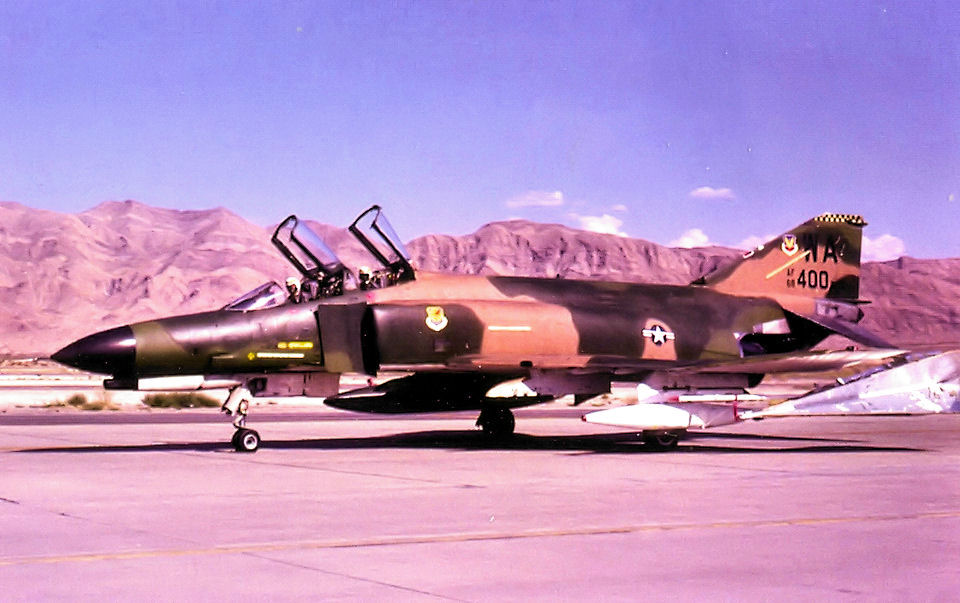
The Las Vegas Range of mountains is visible beyond a 66th FWS F-4E on the Nellis tarmac.

The USAF Fighter Weapons School reactivated 30 December 1981 in the 57th wing and the 66th, 414th and 433d Fighter Weapons Squadrons became its "A-10", "F-4E" and "F-15A" divisions (the 414th was the "Red Flag Training Squadron" in 1996). The 422d FWS aircraft and personnel became the "F-16 Division" and the squadron heraldry transferred to the 422d Test and Evaluation Squadron. The FWS mission expanded on 15 June 1993 to include all Air Combat Command weapons (B-52 & B-1 Divisions) and in 1995, rescue helicopters (HH-60 Division). RC-135 Rivet Joint and EC-130 Compass Call courses were also added to the CCO Division in 1995, as well as a Space Division in 1996 (UAVs in 2008).

In 1981, the Gunsmoke gunnery meet was first held and the 57th Fighter Weapons Wing was reorganized as part of the establishment of the Fighter Weapons School, e.g., the 422d Test and Evaluation Squadron for aircraft modifications was established on 30 December 1981 from the 422d Fighter Weapons Squadron. In 1990, the 64th and 65th Tactical Fighter Training Aggressor Squadrons and the 4440th TFTG were inactivated in 1990 at the end of the Cold War. In November 1991, the 57th implemented the USAF Objective Wing organization which was the most comprehensive USAF reorganization plan since 1947, activating the 57th Operations Group for Nellis airfield operations and establishing the 57th Test Group.

==== Air Combat Command ====
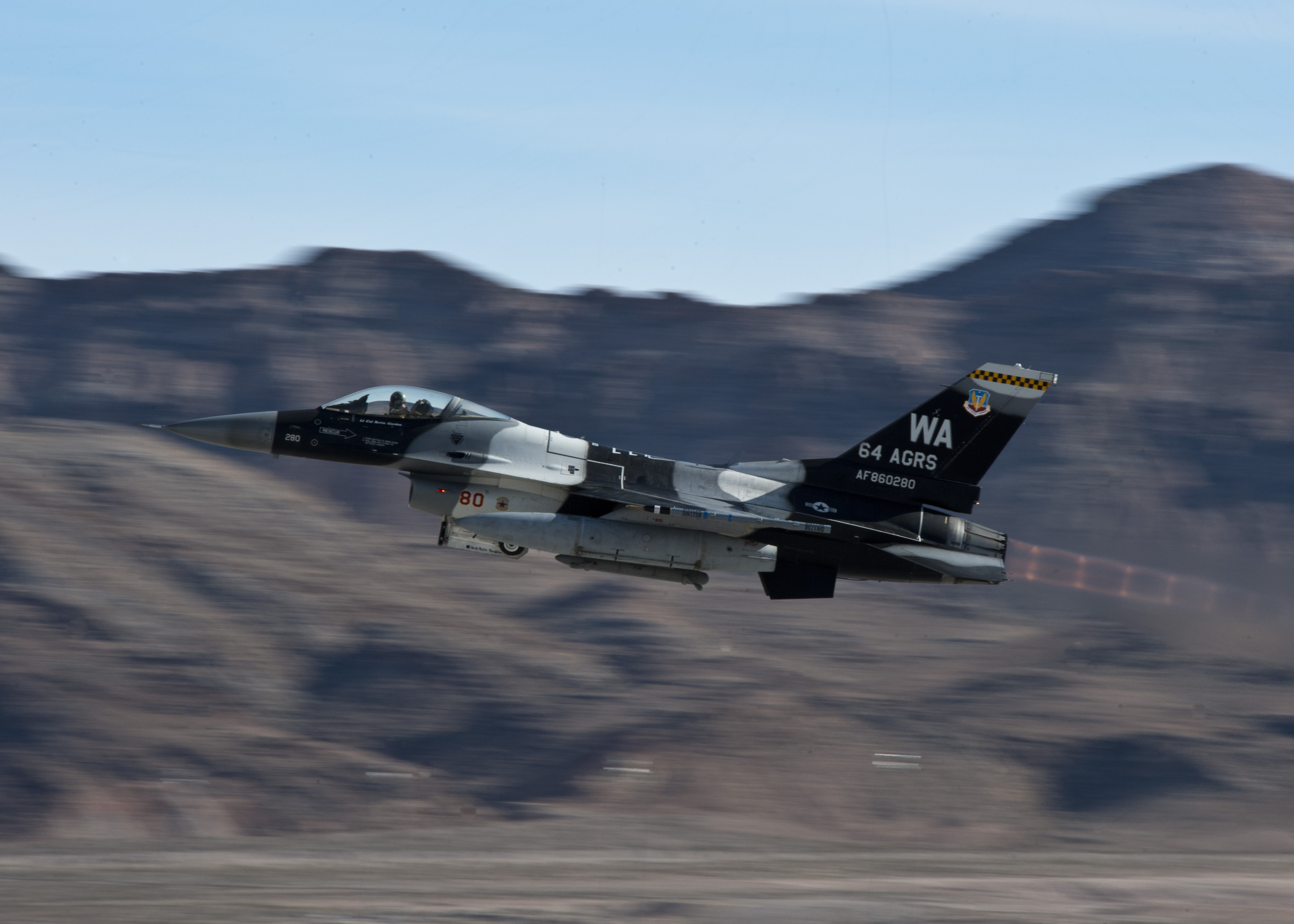
64th Aggressor Squadron F-16 takes off from Nellis AFB during Red Flag 14-1

Nellis transferred to Air Combat Command on 1 June 1992, at the end of the Cold War when Tactical Air Command was inactivated. The 57th Wing was designated on 15 June 1993 from the 57th Operations Group in conjunction with the introduction of the RQ-1 Predator and MQ-9 Reaper unmanned aerial vehicles (UAV). The USAF Combat Rescue School was also established in 1993 for HH-60 Pave Hawk instructional flying. "In 1996, AETC moved the PJ Advanced Weapons Course from Nellis AFB to Kirtland AFB". The 98th Range Wing was activated at Nellis on 29 October 2001 for Nellis Air Force Range control (previous range control was by the FWC). After Detachment 13, 372d Training Squadron opened its F/A-22 maintenance training facility on 29 November 2001, on 14 January 2003 Nellis received the first production F-22A Raptor for the F-22 Force Development Evaluation program and Weapons School (12 Raptors had been assigned to the 422d Test and Evaluation Squadron by July 2008).

"Aggressor" training was reactivated under the 57th Operations Group in 2003 and in 2006 Nellis had the Air Ground Operations School. On 1 May 2007, the UAV reconnaissance elements assigned to the 57th Operations Group transferred to the 432nd Wing. Detachment 1 of the Space Warfare Center was established at Nellis in 1996 after the "Nellis Combined Air Operations Center", the Warfare Center transferred Nellis Air Force Range control to the 98th Range Wing in 2001, and the annual Aviation Nation airshow began at Nellis in 2002. The Nellis Solar Power Plant constructed 23 April–December 2007 on Nellis' west side was visited by president Barack Obama on 27 May 2009. In 2010, the 505th Operations Squadron operated the Combined Air and Space Operations Center-Nellis.

The 57th Adversary Tactics Group merged into the 57th Operations Group on 31 March 2020. On 1 June 2020 the 800th Rapid Engineer Deployable, Heavy Operational Repair Squadron, Engineer (RED HORSE) Group activated at Nellis, with the 820th Red Horse Squadron as a subordinate unit.

=== Major commands to which assigned ===
- West Coast Air Corps Training Center, April 1941
- Air Corps Flying Training Command, 23 January 1942 and various subsequent designations through Air Training Command, 1 July – 31 December 1946, 30 August 1947
- Tactical Air Command, 1 July 1958
- Air Combat Command, 1 June 1992 – present

=== Major units assigned ===
- 79th Air Base Group, 7 July 1941

70th Base HQ and Air Base Squadron, c. 14 August 1942
82d Flying Training Wing (Flexible Gunnery) 8 January 1943 – 16 June 1946

- 3595th Pilot Training Wing, 1 April 1948 – 1 July 1958
- 4520th Combat Crew Training Wing, 1 July 1958 – 1 September 1966
- 4525th Fighter Weapons Wing, 1 September 1966 – 15 October 1969
- 474th Tactical Fighter Wing, 20 January 1968 – 15 October 1989
- 57th Wing (Various Designations), 22 August 1969 – present
- 554th Operations Support Wing, 1 March 1980 – 1 November 1995
- USAF Fighter Weapons School, 1 January – 1 September 1966; 30 December 1981 (USAF Weapons School on 15 June 1993)
- 4477th Tactical Evaluation Flight ("Red Eagles"), 1 April 1975 – 1990
- USAF Tactical Fighter Weapons Center, 1 September 1966 (USAF Warfare Center on 15 November 2005)

== Role and operations ==
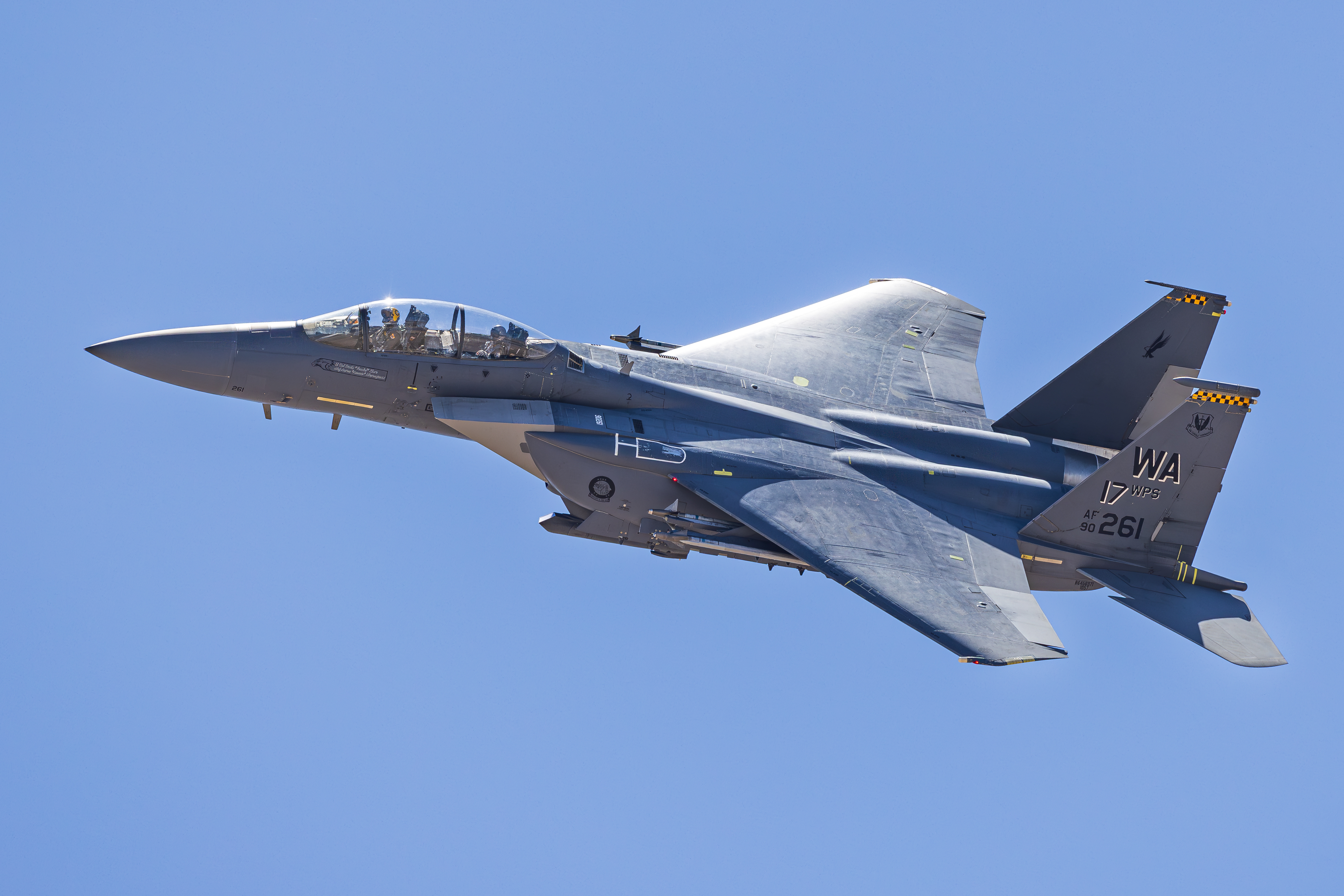
An F-15E Strike Eagle taking part in a Red Flag exercise, departing Nellis in July 2023

Nellis Air Force Base is known by the USAF as the "Home of the Fighter Pilot" and is the Air Force's focus for advanced combat training. The main unit at Nellis is the USAF Warfare Center, which coordinates training for composite strike forces involving aircraft types from across the USAF inventory, accompanied by air and ground units of the US Army, US Navy, US Marines, and aircraft from other NATO and allied nations. Training is delivered through a series of exercises which typically take place at the Nevada Test and Training Range (NTTR), the primary examples being Exercise Red Flag and Exercise Green Flag (West).

As of October 2019, Nellis employed 9,500 military and civilian personnel. The total military population is more than 40,000, including family members and retired military personnel in the area.

The base also supports operations at nearby Creech Air Force Base, Tonopah Test Range, and the Nevada National Security Site. Nellis ground systems for range operations (e.g., by callsign "Nellis Control") include the Computer and Computed Subsystem used to receive microwave signals from the NTTR Ground-Based per Station the Tracking and Communications Subsystem (TCS) for presentation on Nellis' Display and Debrief SubSystem (DDS).

Nellis Area I has the airfield (2 runways and ramp space for up to 300 aircraft), recreation and shopping facilities, dormitories/temporary lodging, some family housing, "and most of the command and support structures", e.g., Suter Hall for Red Flag. Nellis Area II northeast of the main base "at the foot of Sunrise Mountain" (formerly the U.S. Navy's Lake Mead Base) has Nellis Gun Club and the 820th Red Horse Squadron. Nellis Area III is west of the main base with family housing, administration and industrial areas, and the Mike O'Callaghan Military Medical Center. Area III also includes a 9.5-hectare (23.4-acre) munitions response area (MRA XU741) which had World War II storage for small arms ammunition, pyrotechnics, and chemical bombs and that now includes 2 remaining World War II buildings (numbers 1039 & 1047), 5 modern igloos, and RV storage.

== Based units ==
Time-lapse of the ramp at Nellis AFB during Red Flag 21–1 in February 2021

Flying and notable non-flying units based at Nellis Air Force Base.

Units marked GSU are Geographically Separate Units, which although based at Nellis, are subordinate to a parent unit based at another location.

=== United States Air Force ===
Air Combat Command

- US Air Force Warfare Center
  - 99th Air Base Wing (Host wing)
    - 99th Comptroller Squadron
    - 99th Mission Support Group
      - 99th Civil Engineer Squadron
      - 99th Communications Squadron
      - 99th Contracting Squadron
      - 99th Logistics Readiness Squadron
      - 99th Force Support Squadron
      - 99th Security Forces Squadron
    - 99th Medical Group
      - 99th Aerospace Medical Squadron
      - 99th Dental Squadron
      - 99th Medical Operations Squadron
      - 99th Medical Support Squadron
  - 53rd Wing
    - 53rd Test and Evaluation Group (GSU)
      - 88th Test and Evaluation Squadron – HC-130J Combat King II and HH-60G Pave Hawk
      - 422nd Test and Evaluation Squadron – A-10C Thunderbolt II, F-15C/D Eagle, F-15E Strike Eagle, F-16C/D Fighting Falcon, F-22A Raptor, F-35A Lightning II
      - Combat Search and Rescue Combined Test Force
      - Detachment 3
    - 53rd Test Management Group (GSU)
      - 59th Test and Evaluation Squadron
  - 57th Wing
    - 561st Joint Tactics Squadron
    - US Air Force Weapons School
      - 6th Weapons Squadron – F-35A Lightning II
      - 8th Weapons Squadron - EC-130 and RC-135
      - 16th Weapons Squadron – F-16C/D Fighting Falcon
      - 17th Weapons Squadron – F-15E Strike Eagle
      - 19th Weapons Squadron - RQ-4 Global Hawk and U-2 Dragonlady
      - 26th Weapons Squadron – MQ-9A Reaper
      - 32nd Weapons Squadron
      - 34th Weapons Squadron – HC-130J Combat King II and HH-60G Pave Hawk
      - 57th Weapons Support Squadron
      - 66th Weapons Squadron – A-10C Thunderbolt II / Joint Terminal Attack Control
      - 315th Weapons Squadron – LGM-30 Minuteman III
      - 328th Weapons Squadron
      - 433rd Weapons Squadron – F-22A Raptor
    - 57th Operations Group
      - 6th Combat Training Squadron
      - 57th Adversary Tactics Support Squadron
      - 57th Information Aggressor Squadron
      - 57th Operations Support Squadron
      - 64th Aggressor Squadron – F-16C/D Fighting Falcon
      - 65th Aggressor Squadron – F-35A Lightning II
      - 414th Combat Training Squadron
      - 507th Air Defense Aggressor Squadron
      - 547th Intelligence Squadron
      - 549th Combat Training Squadron
    - 57th Maintenance Group
      - 57th Aircraft Maintenance Squadron
      - 57th Munitions Squadron
      - 757th Aircraft Maintenance Squadron
    - US Air Force Air Demonstration Squadron (Thunderbirds) – F-16C/D Fighting Falcon
    - US Air Force Advanced Maintenance and Munitions Operations School
  - 505th Command and Control Wing
    - 505th Test and Evaluation Group (GSU)
      - 505th Test Squadron
      - Combined Air Operations Center – Nellis
  - Nevada Test and Training Range
    - 31st Combat Training Squadron
    - Virtual Test and Training Center

- Fifteenth Air Force
  - 355th Wing
    - Detachment 1 (GSU)
    - 563rd Rescue Group (Operating Location-Alpha (OL-A)) (GSU)
      - 58th Rescue Squadron
      - 66th Rescue Squadron – HH-60G Pave Hawk
      - 855th Aircraft Maintenance Squadron
  - 800th RED HORSE Group
    - 820th RED HORSE Squadron
- Sixteenth Air Force
  - 363rd Intelligence, Surveillance, and Reconnaissance Wing
    - 365th Intelligence, Surveillance and Reconnaissance Group (GSU)
      - 526th Intelligence Squadron
      - 547th Intelligence Squadron

Air Force Materiel Command (AFMC)

- Air Force Test Center
  - 96th Test Wing
    - 96th Operations Group
      - 413th Flight Test Squadron
        - Detachment 1 (GSU) – HH-60G Pave Hawk

Air Force Reserve Command (AFRC)

- Tenth Air Force
  - 926th Wing
    - 926th Operation Group
      - 706th Aggressor Squadron – F-16C/D Fighting Falcon
      - 926th Aerospace Medicine Squadron
      - 926th Aircraft Maintenance Squadron
      - 926th Force Support Squadron
      - 926th Security Forces Squadron

Air National Guard (ANG)

- Nevada Air National Guard
  - 152nd Airlift Wing
    - 232nd Combat Training Squadron (GSU)

=== Department of Defense ===
United States Strategic Command

- Global Operations (J3) Directorate
  - Joint Electromagnetic Preparedness for Advanced Combat

== Geography ==
Nellis AFB covers about 4,600 ha (11,300 acres) in the northeast corner of the Las Vegas Valley, an alluvial basin in the Basin and Range Province. Since World War II, Nellis has had areas added, such as Area II in 1969, but still has about 2,800 ha (7,000 acres) of undeveloped space. One World War II runway has been removed. The base has 3 areas (I, II, III). The United States Geological Survey names five different locations for the base: "Nellis Air Force Base", the airfield, the post office, a Community College of Southern Nevada campus, and the census-designated place (CDP).

Historical population
Census	Pop.	Note	%±
1970	6,449		—
1980	6,205		−3.8%
1990	8,377		35.0%
2000	8,896		6.2%
2010	3,187		−64.2%

=== Census-designated place ===
The Nellis Air Force Base CDP is an 8.0 km^{2} (3.1 sq mi) region defined by the United States Census Bureau as of the 2010 United States census. The CDP area includes military family housing (e.g., in Nellis Areas I & III), dormitories, and lodging as for aircrew temporary quarters during Red Flag exercises.

=== Nellis AFB complex ===
The Nellis Air Force Base Complex is a group of southern Nevada military areas that are predominantly USAF and Bureau of Land Management areas outside of the base (e.g., controlled by military units at Nellis). The complex's land areas include Nellis AFB, the USAF Nevada Test and Training Range, the active portion of the Small Arms Range Annex north of the base, the annex's Formerly Used Defense Site of 2,337 hectares (5,775 acres) (cleared in March 1972, returned to the DoI), 13 BLM areas of 2.3 ha (5.7 acres) each leased for Patriot Radar/Communications Exercises, and other BLM sites "under Military Operations Area (MOA) airspace". Nellis AFB also leases space at the former Las Vegas AFS, and environmental sites of the Tonopah Bombing Range (FUDS) are monitored by the EPA. Additional Formerly Used Defense Sites associated with the area's military operations are the Nye County Areas A, G, H, & I; the "Delamar Dry Lake Test Annex" and the "Sunrise Mountain Machine Gun Range".

== Education ==
There is a charter school on post, Coral Academy of Science Nellis Campus, which covers grades Kindergarten through 8.

The area school district is the Clark County School District. The zoned public schools for the base are as follows: Lomie G. Heard Elementary School, Carroll M. Johnston Middle School, and Mojave High School.

== In popular culture ==
- A scaled-down version of Nellis Air Force Base appears in the 2010 video game Fallout: New Vegas. The base is home to the Boomers, a reclusive tribe of former Vault 34 dwellers with access to artillery and explosives.
- The base is briefly shown in the 2007 film Transformers, where Captain William Lennox and Sergeant Robert Epps are contacted by Sector 7.
- The base is briefly mentioned at the end of Terminator 3: Rise of the Machines (2003). It is said to be under attack from the machines.
- In the television series Stargate SG-1, Nellis Air Force Base is home to the top secret facility Area 51, where alien technologies are studied.
- The base is mentioned and features as the base from which the drone pilots operate from in the 2024 film Land Of Bad.
- In the X-Files Season 1 Episode 2 Nellis Air Force Base is talked about for UFO's.

== See also ==
- List of United States Air Force installations
- Nevada World War II Army Airfields
