= 64th Aggressor Squadron =

US Air Force squadron

64th Aggressor Squadron

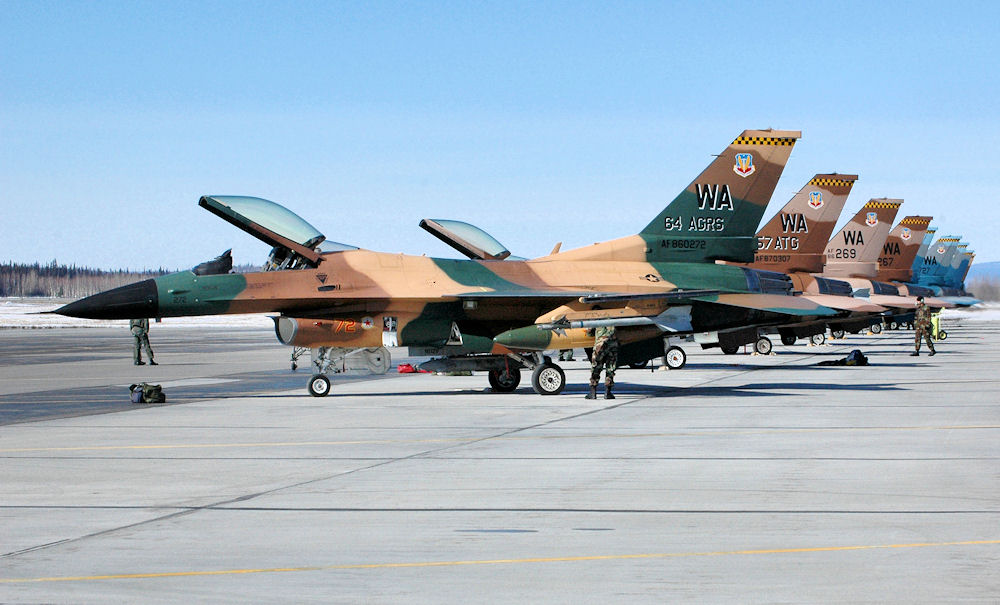
- F-16s of the 64th Aggressor Squadron in 2006
- Active: 1941–1945; 1946–1969; 1972–1990; 2003–present
- Country: United States
- Branch: United States Air Force
- Role: Fighter Aggressor
- Part of: Air Combat Command: United States Air Force Warfare Center; 57th Wing; 57th Operations Group
- Garrison/HQ: Nellis Air Force Base, Nevada
- Nickname(s): Gomers
- Engagements: World War II – EAME Theater

- Decorations: Distinguished Unit Citation (3x) Air Force Outstanding Unit Award (5x) French Croix de Guerre with Palm

Insignia
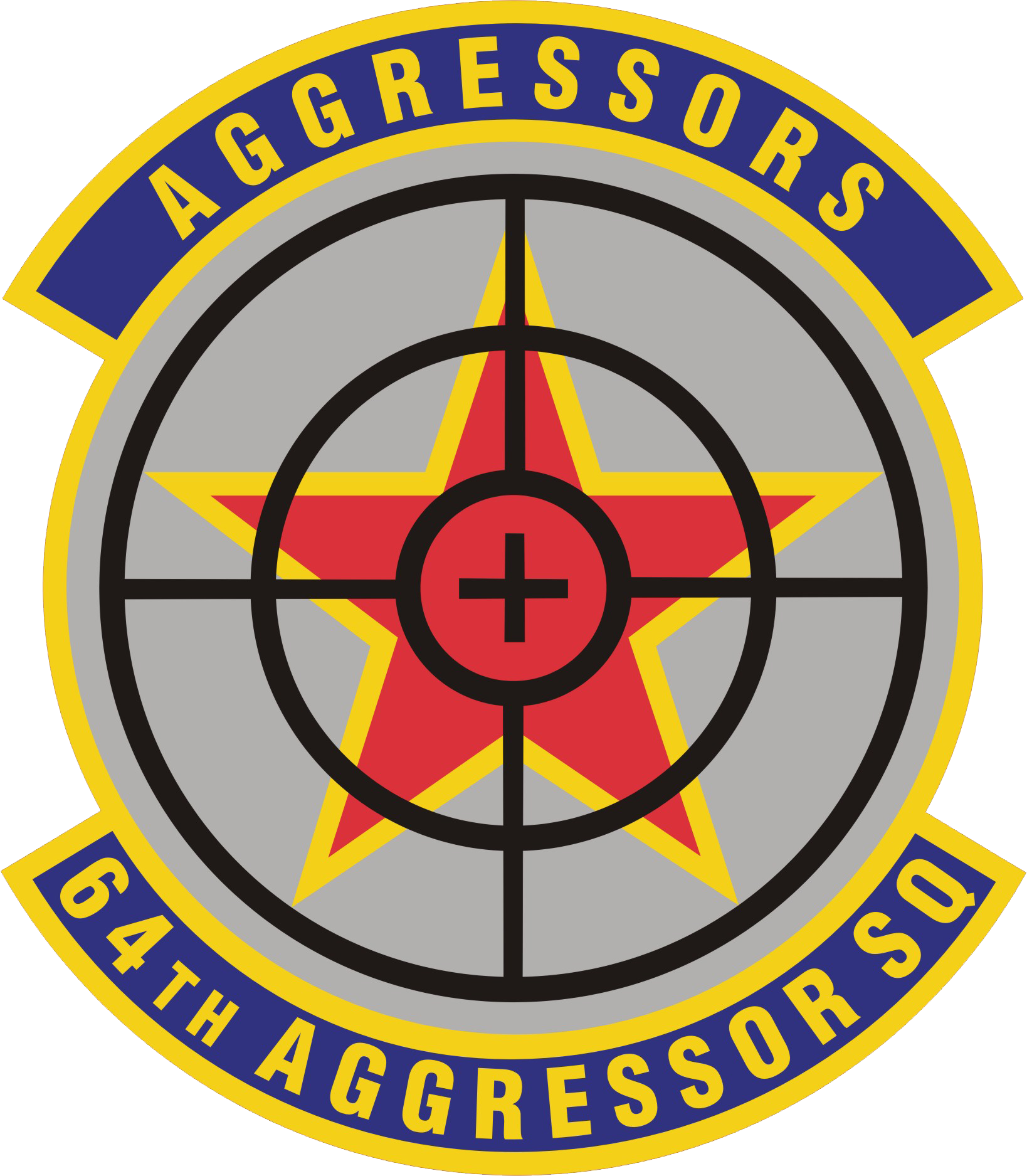
- 64th Aggressor Squadron emblem (approved 13 September 2007)

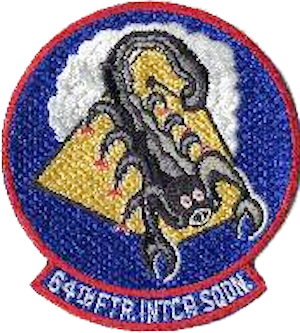
- Patch with 64th Fighter-Interceptor Squadron emblem (approved 7 July 1956)

The 64th Aggressor Squadron is a United States Air Force unit. It is assigned to the 57th Adversary Tactics Group at Nellis Air Force Base, Nevada.

The 64th AGRS is assigned 24 F-16C Fighting Falcon aircraft, painted in camouflage schemes identical to those observed on Russian-manufactured aircraft providing Air Combat Maneuvering training to USAF and other aviation forces in conjunction with Red Flag exercises. The unit operates in conjunction with the 65th Aggressor Squadron, using F-15C Eagles which had been disbanded on 26 September 2014 due to budget constraints but reactivated on 9 May 2019. The purpose of the squadron is to teach adversarial tactics and provide dissimilar air combat training to US Air Force flying units.

== History ==
=== World War II ===
The squadron was first formed as a P-40 Warhawk pursuit squadron in January 1941 as part of the Army Air Corps Northeast Defense Sector (later I Fighter Command) at Mitchel Field, New York. It trained in New England and provided air defense of the northeast after the Japanese attack on Pearl Harbor.

It was reassigned to the U.S. Army Middle East Force in Egypt, July 1942, becoming part of IX Fighter Command. It took part in the British Western Desert Campaign, engaged in combat during the Battle of El Alamein and, as part of Ninth Air Force, supported the Commonwealth Eighth Army's drive across Egypt and Libya, escorting bombers and flying strafing and dive-bombing missions against airfields, communications, and troop concentrations until Axis defeat in Tunisia in May 1943. The unit participated in the reduction of Pantelleria (May–June 1943) and the conquest of Sicily (July–August 1943).

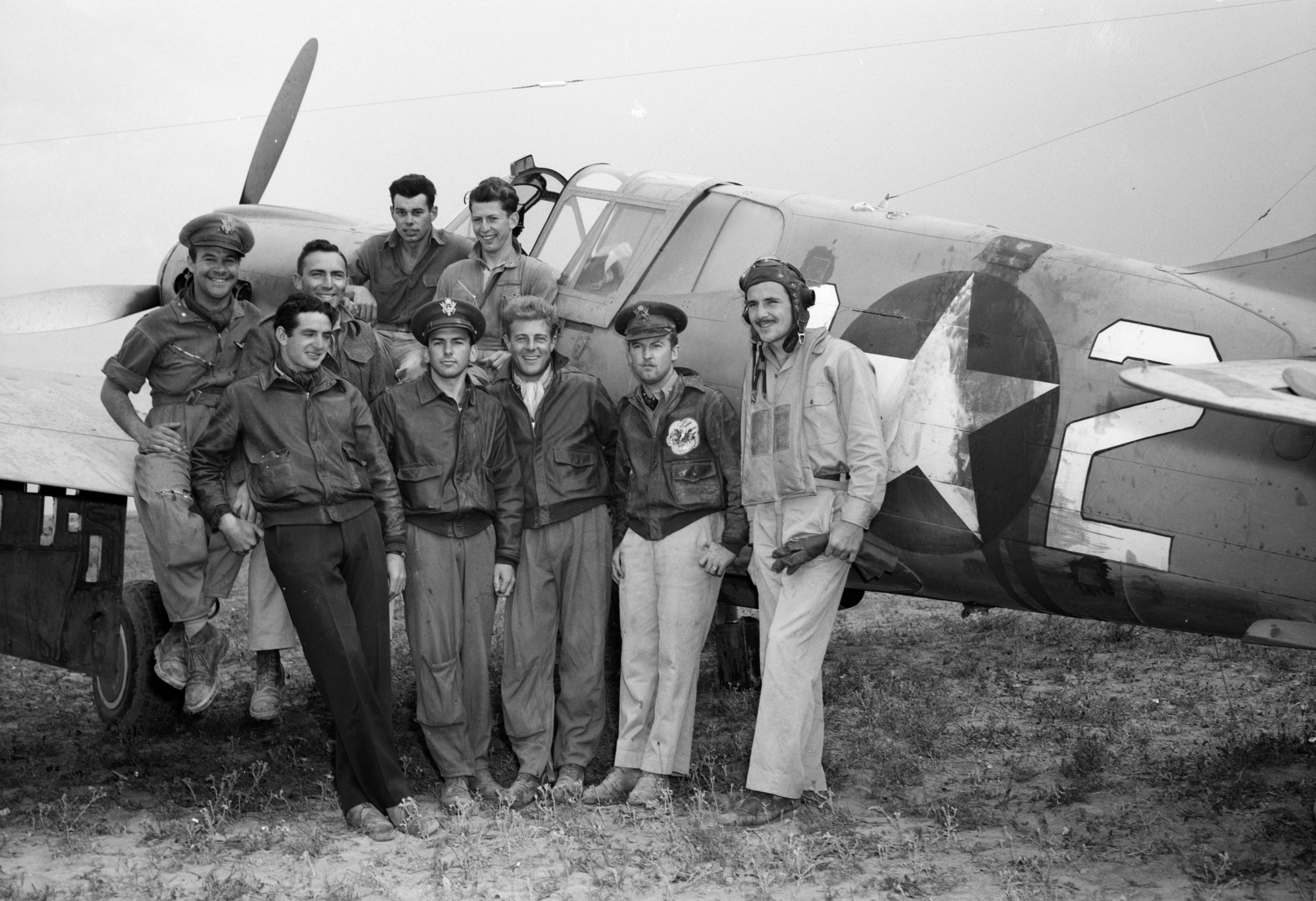
Pilots of the 64th FS, 57th FG, in North Africa, April 1943.

The squadron supported the British Eighth Army's landing at Termoli and subsequent operations in Italy, being reassigned to Twelfth Air Force in August 1943. It flew dive-bombing, strafing, patrol, and escort missions.

In 1944, the squadron converted to P-47 Thunderbolt aircraft and flew interdiction operations in Italy. It moved to Corsica on 30 March 1944 to operate as a separate task force, and flew interdiction missions against railroads, communication targets, and motor vehicles behind enemy lines, providing a minimum of 48 fighter-bomber sorties per day.

The squadron participated in the French campaign against Elba in June 1944 and in the invasion of Southern France in August. It engaged in interdiction and support operations in northern Italy from September 1944 to May 1945.

The 64th flew its last combat mission on 2 May 1945. It remained in northern Italy after the end of the European War, demobilizing throughout the summer of 1945. It was reassigned to the United States in August 1945 without personnel or equipment and was inactivated at the end of August.

=== Cold War ===
Reactivated in August 1946 as part of Eleventh Air Force (Later Alaskan Air Command) as part of the air defense forces in the northwest Pacific. It provided air defense initially in the Aleutian Islands, then moved to Nome in early 1947 and to Elmendorf Air Force Base in the fall of 1947. Initially flew P-51 Mustangs, then became equipped with F-80 Shooting Star jet aircraft in 1948. Reassigned to Alaskan Air Command 10th Air Division and became a permanent part of the Alaskan Defense Forces throughout the 1950s, upgrading to the F-94 and F-89 dedicated interceptors.

Was reassigned to McChord Field, Washington in 1957, upgraded to F-102A Delta Dagger as part of the 25th Air Division, 325th Fighter Group. Provided air defense of the Seattle area and the Pacific Northwest until 1966.

=== Vietnam war ===
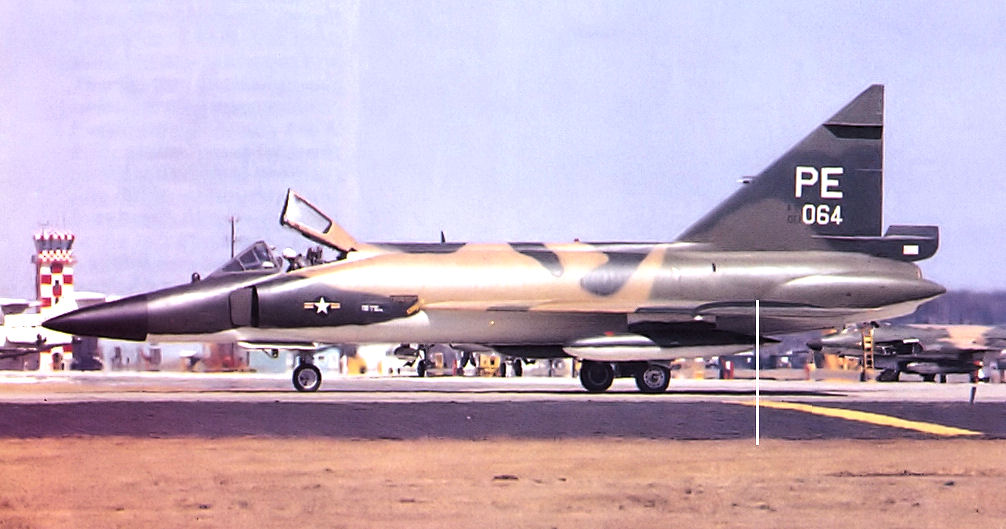
64th FIS Convair F-102A-60-CO Delta Dagger 56–1064, Clark AB PI 1967

Was deployed by Air Defense Command to Clark Air Base, Philippines in 1966 as part of Pacific Air Forces to provide air defense of Luzon and northern Philippines. Flew F-102s from Clark, and rotated flights to bases in South Vietnam (including Da Nang Air Base) and Thailand to provide air defense against the unlikely event that North Vietnamese aircraft would attack, July 1966 – December 1969. Deployed temporarily to South Korea during the Pueblo crisis in January–June 1968. Inactivated in 1969 as part of the retirement of the F-102.

=== Aggressor training ===
Activated within the 57th Fighter Weapons Wing on 15 October 1972. Initially equipped with T-38A Talons, upgraded in April 1976 with Northrop F-5E Tiger II export fighters having been originally destined for delivery to South Vietnam and became available when the South collapsed. Since the F-5E had approximately the size and performance characteristics of a Soviet MiG-21, it was used throughout US and overseas to teach adversarial tactics and provide dissimilar air combat training to US Air Force flying units, eventually becoming the 64th Aggressor Squadron. F-5s carried no tail codes, although they did carry Nellis black/yellow check tail stripe and TAC emblem on tail. Aircraft were painted in Soviet Air Forces motif, with subdued USAF markings. The last two digits of the F-5's tail number were painted in red on front fuselage, highlighted in white.

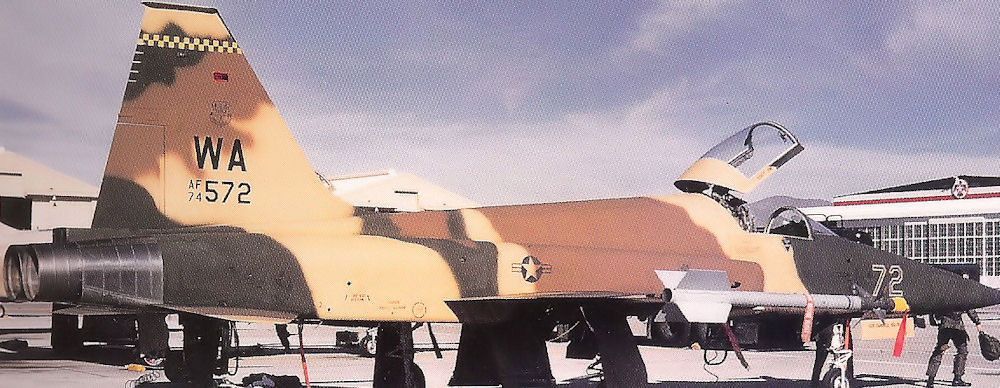
First generation aggressor F-5E 74-1572 from the 64th Aggressor Squadron, 1980

From October 1972 to June 1990, deployed throughout US and overseas to teach adversarial tactics and provide dissimilar air combat training to US Air Force flying units. Re-designated 64th Tactical Fighter Aggressor Squadron on 30 December 1981; re-designated again as 65th Aggressor Squadron on 4 January 1983. Added subdued "WA" tail code in early 1987.

Transitioned to the F-16A Fighting Falcon on 1 April 1988 when the F-5Es began having structural problems with the airframes. F-16As initially borrowed from the 474th TFW at Nellis, tail coded "NA" before receiving production F-16C/Ds from General Dynamics in July 1989. F-16s were tail coded "WA", painted in a similar motif as the F-5Es with a black/yellow check tail stripe.

The squadron was replaced by the 4440th Tactical Fighter Training Group, (Advisory Tactics Division) and assigned to the USAF Weapons School. The squadron was subsequently inactivated on 5 October 1990.

=== Modern era ===
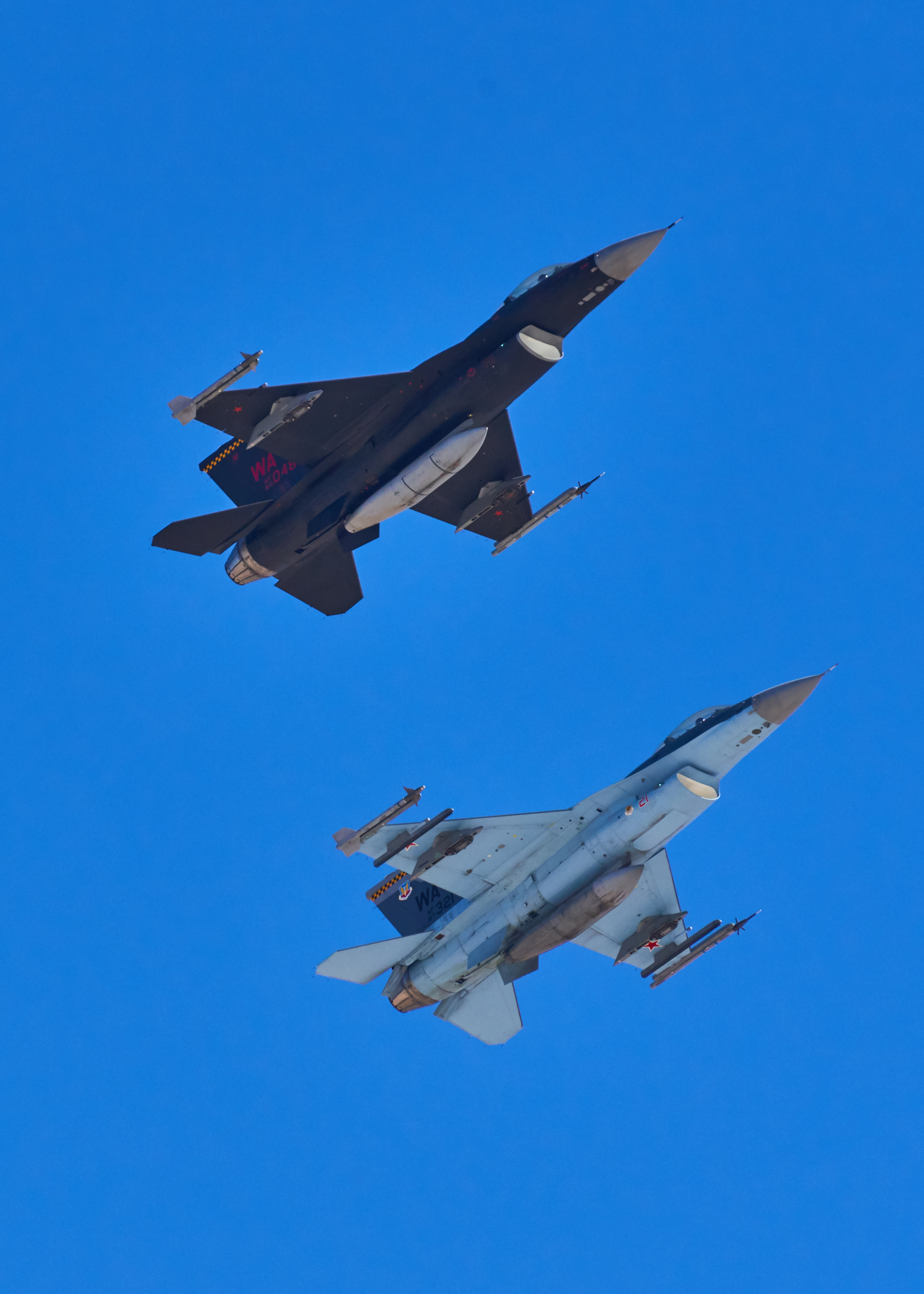
F-16A Fighting Falcon's from the 64th Aggressor Squadron

The squadron was reactivated on 3 October 2003, again flying the F-16 as an Aggressor Squadron. Participates in USAF Red Flag and Canadian Forces Maple Flag exercises, provides USAF Weapons School syllabus support, priority test mission support, and road shows that visit various units throughout the CONUS to ACC units for training. In 2020, Aggressor F-16s were painted in camouflage similar to that of Sukhoi Su-57 to simulate the latter in opposing force training.

== Lineage ==
- Constituted as the 64th Pursuit Squadron (Interceptor) on 20 November 1940

Activated on 15 January 1941
Redesignated 64th Pursuit Squadron (Interceptor) (Twin Engine) on 31 January 1942
Redesignated 64th Fighter Squadron (Twin Engine) on 15 May 1942
Redesignated 64th Fighter Squadron on 1 June 1942
Redesignated 64th Fighter Squadron, Single Engine on 21 August 1944
Inactivated on 7 November 1945

- Activated on 15 August 1946

Redesignated 64th Fighter Squadron, Jet on 20 July 1948
Redesignated 64th Fighter-Interceptor Squadron on 20 January 1950
Inactivated on 15 December 1969

- Redesignated 64th Fighter Weapons Squadron on 7 September 1972

Activated on 15 October 1972
Redesignated 64th Tactical Fighter Training Aggressor Squadron on 30 December 1981
Redesignated 64th Aggressor Squadron on 1 April 1983
Inactivated on 5 October 1990

- Activated on 3 October 2003

=== Assignments ===
- 57th Pursuit Group (later 57th Fighter Group), 15 January 1941 – 7 November 1945
- 57th Fighter Group (later 57th Fighter-Interceptor Group), 15 August 1946
- 10th Air Division, 13 April 1953
- 325th Fighter Group, 15 August 1957
- 326th Fighter Group, 15 March 1960
- 57th Fighter Group, 1 April 1961
- 405th Fighter Wing, 10 June 1966 – 15 December 1969
- 57th Fighter Weapons Wing (later 57th Tactical Training Wing, 57th Fighter Weapons Wing), 15 October 1972– 5 October 1990
- 57th Operations Group, 3 October 2003
- 57th Adversary Tactics Group, 1 July 2005 – 31 March 2020
- 57th Operations Group, 31 March 2020 – present

=== Stations ===
- Mitchel Field, New York, 15 January 1941
- Bradley Field, Connecticut, 19 August 1941
- Revere Airport 42°25′40″N 071°00′47″W, Massachusetts, 12 December 1941
- Boston Airport, Massachusetts, 9 February– 5 July 1942
- Muqeible Airfield, Palestine, 19 August 1942
- RAF El Amiriya, Egypt, 16 September 1942
- Landing Ground 37, Egypt, 5 November 1942
- RAF Gambut, Libya, 13 November 1942
- Martuba Airfield, Libya, 20 November 1942
- Belandah Airfield, Libya, 11 December 1942
- Hamraiet Airfield, Libya, 12 January 1943
- Zuara Airfield, Libya, 24 February 1943
- Ben Gardane Airfield, Tunisia, 10 March 1943
- Soltane Airfield, Tunisia, 20 March 1943
- Hazbub Airfield, Tunisia, 4 April 1943
- Skhirra Airfield, Tunisia, 11 April 1943
- El Djem Airfield, Tunisia, 14 April 1943
- Hani Airfield, Tunisia, 21 April 1943
- Bou Grara Airfield, Tunisia, 19 May 1943
- Takali Airfield, Malta, 27 June 1943
- Pachino Airfield, Sicily, Italy, 19 July 1943
- Scordia Airfield, Sicily, Italy, 29 July 1943
- Milazzo Airfield, Sicily, Italy, 12 September 1943
- Rocca Bernardo Airfield, Italy, 17 September 1943
- Rocca Bernardo Airfield, Italy, 25 September 1943
- Foggia Airfield, Italy, 2 October 1943
- Amendola Airfield, Italy, 25 October 1943
- Cercola Airfield, Italy, 3 March 1944
- Alto Airfield, Corsica, France, 30 March 1944
- Ombrene Airfield, Italy, 12 September 1944
- Grosseto Airfield, Italy, 24 September 1944
- Villafranca di Verona Airfield, Italy, 29 April 1945
- Grosseto Airfield, Italy, 8 May 1945
- Bagnoli Airfield, Italy, 15 July – 6 August 1945
- Drew Field, Florida, 23 August – 7 November 1945
- Shemya Army Air Field, Alaska, 15 August 1946
- Marks Field, Alaska, 8 May 1947
- Elmendorf Air Force Base, Alaska, 8 September 1947
- McChord Field, Washington, 15 August 1957
- Paine Field, Washington, 15 March 1960 – 2 June 1966
- Clark Air Base, Philippines, 10 June 1966 – 15 December 1969
- Nellis Air Force Base, Nevada, 15 October 1972 – 5 October 1990
- Nellis Air Force Base, Nevada, 3 October 2003 – present

=== Aircraft ===
- Curtiss P-40 Warhawk, 1941–1944
- Republic P-47 Thunderbolt, 1944–1945
- Lockheed P-38 Lightning, 1946
- North American P-51 Mustang, 1946, 1947–1948
- Lockheed F-80 Shooting Star, 1948–1951
- Lockheed F-94 Starfire, 1951–1954
- Northrop F-89 Scorpion, 1954–1957
- Convair F-102 Delta Dagger, 1957–1969
- Convair TF-102 Delta Dagger, 1957–1969
- Northrop T-38 Talon, 1972–1976
- Northrop F-5E Tiger II, 1976–1988
- General Dynamics F-16 Fighting Falcon, 1988–1990, 2003–Present
