= 57th Wing =

US Air Force training formation

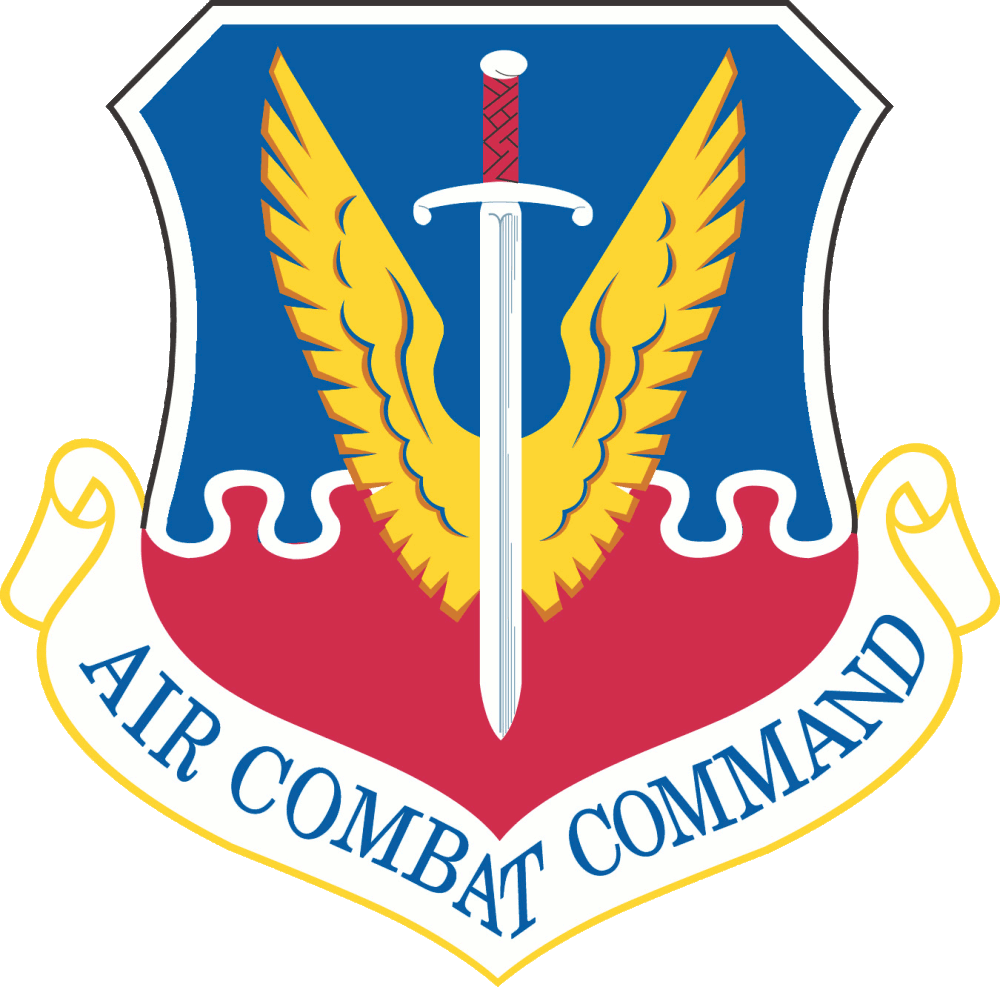
57th Wing

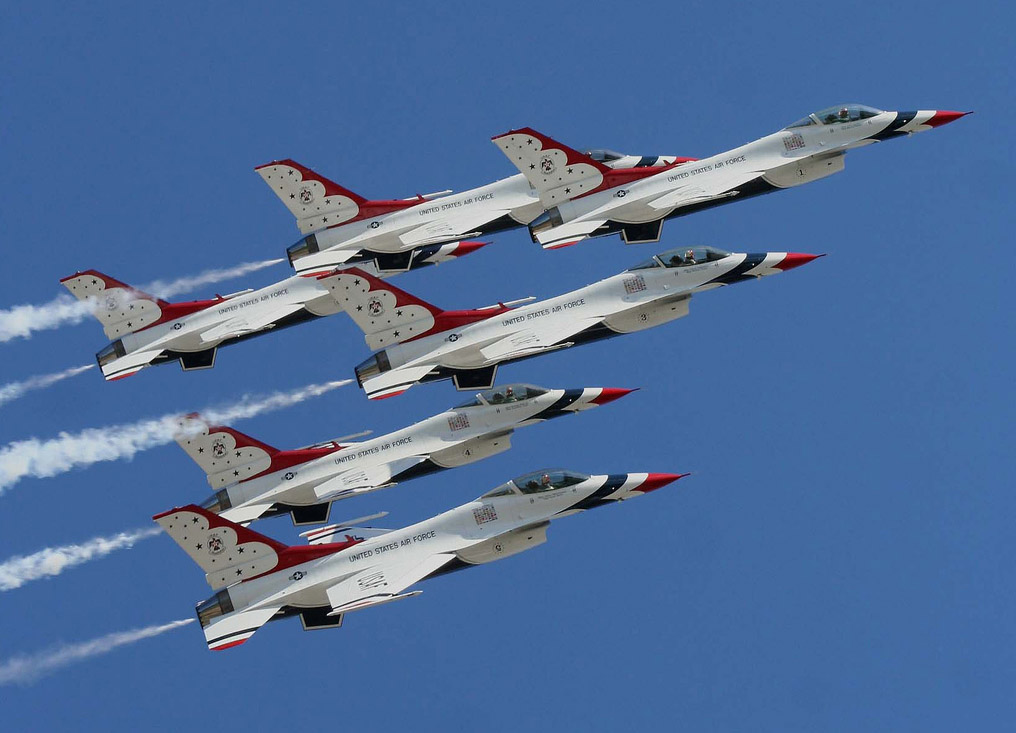
- The USAF Thunderbirds at the dedication of the United States Air Force Memorial 14 October 2006
- Active: 1947–1951; 1969–present
- Country: United States
- Branch: United States Air Force
- Role: Operational Test and Evaluation
- Part of: Air Combat Command
- Garrison/HQ: Nellis Air Force Base
- Decorations: DUC AFOUA

Commanders
- Current commander: Brig Gen Scott C. Mills
- Notable commanders: John P. Jumper; T. Michael Moseley; Joseph Ashy; Jeannie Leavitt

Insignia
- 57th Wing emblem (Note: Approved 2 September 1970.)

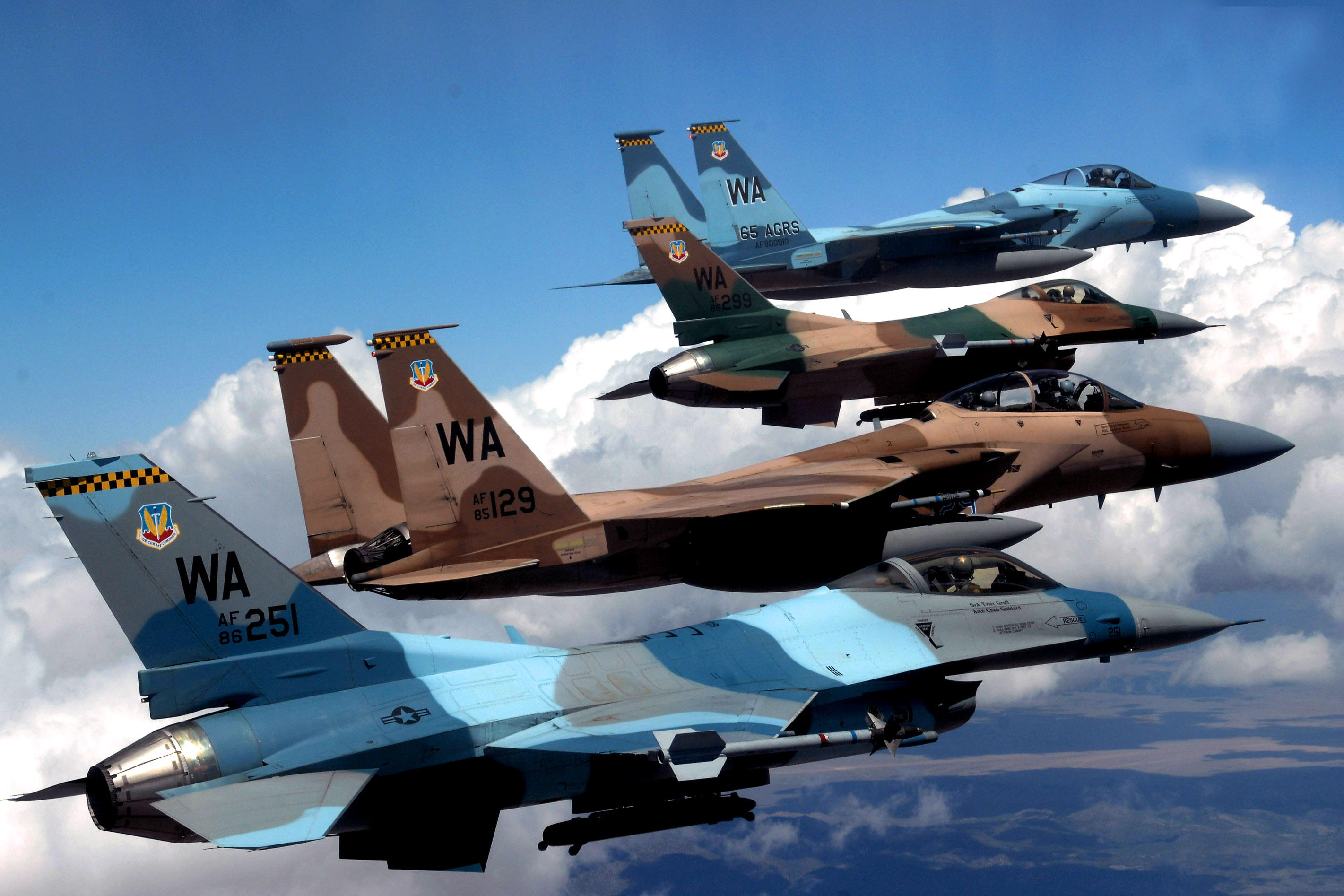
A flight of Aggressor F-15 Eagles and F-16 Fighting Falcons fly in formation. The jets are assigned to the 64th and 65th Aggressor squadrons at Nellis Air Force Base. Identified aircraft are F-16C Block 32C 86-251; Block 25E 84-1299; F-15C-27-MC 80-0010 and F-15D-39-MC 85-129.

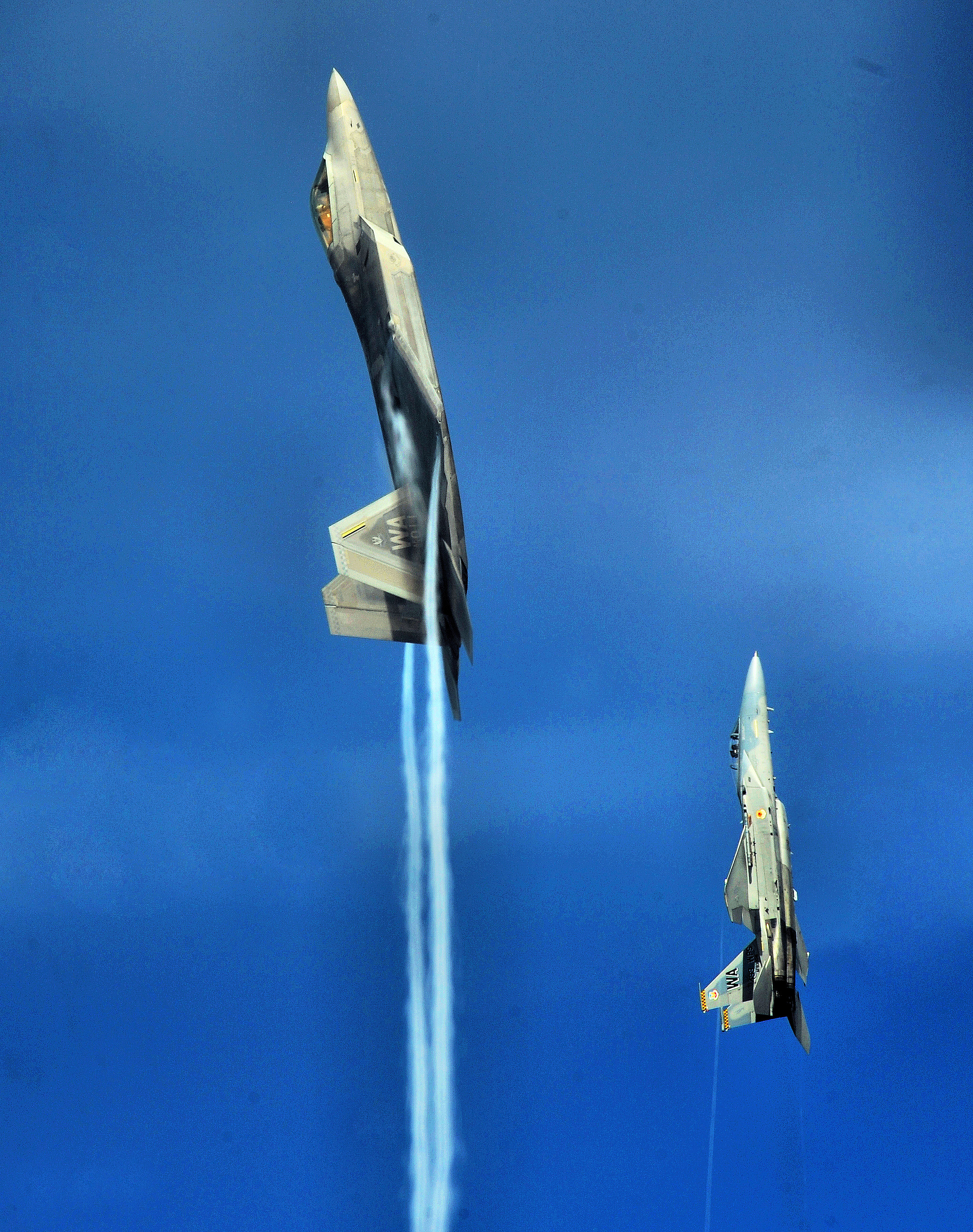
An F-22A Raptor and F-15C Eagle from the U.S. Air Force Weapons School's 433rd Weapons Squadron pull into a vertical climb over the Nevada Test and Training Range 16 July 2010.

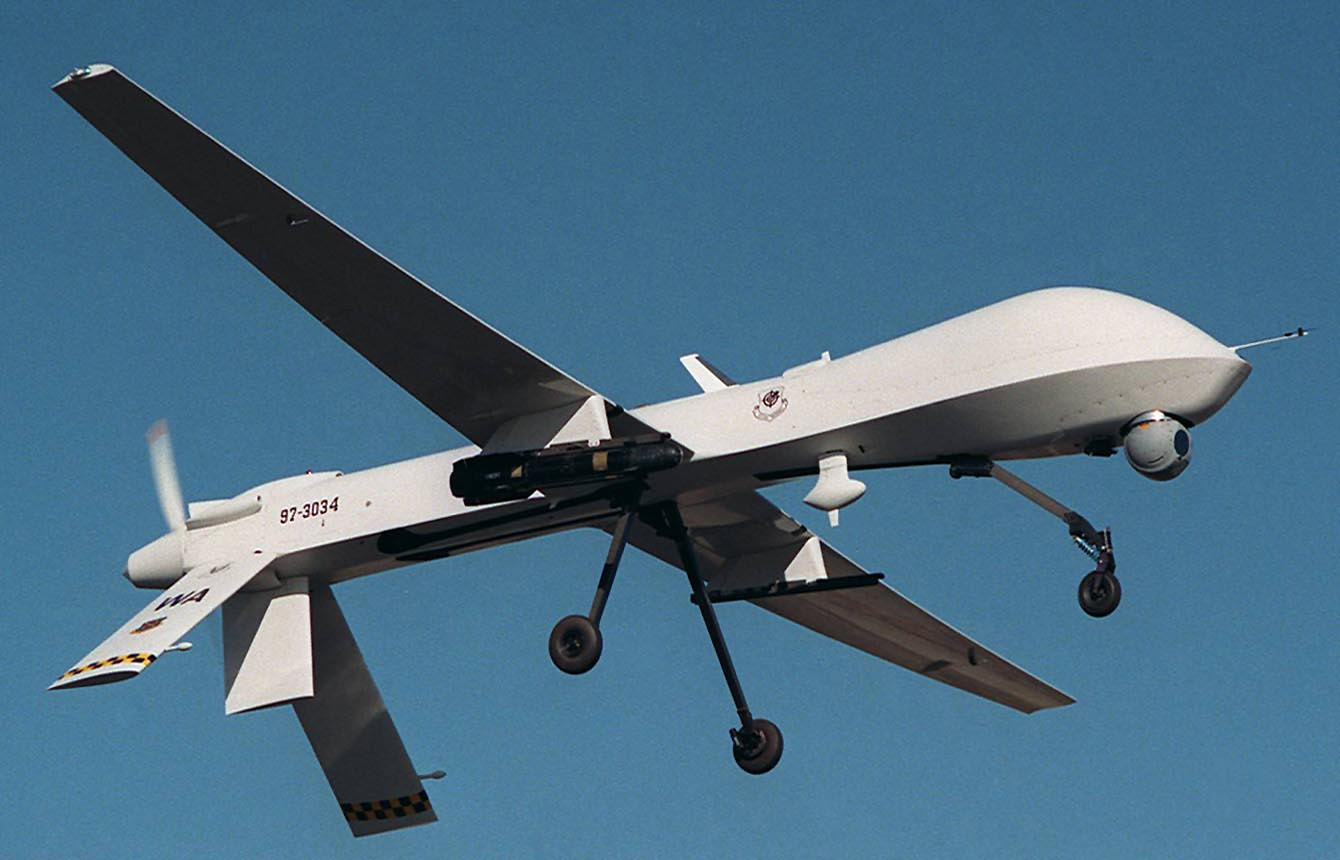
26th Weapons Squadron MQ-1 Predator

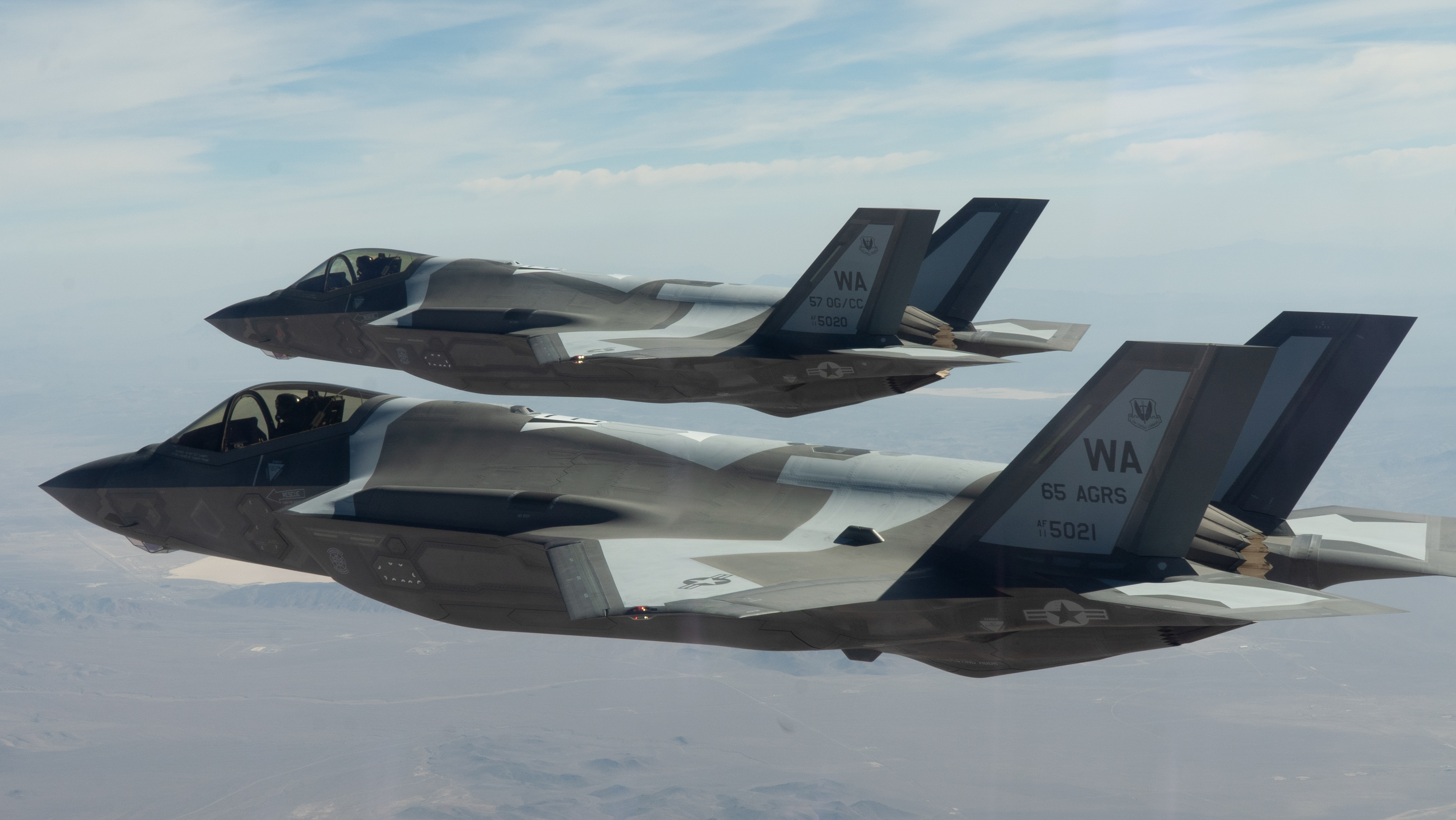
65th Aggressor Squadron F-35A on their way to their inaugural training mission

The 57th Wing (57 WG) is an operational unit of the United States Air Force (USAF) Warfare Center, stationed at Nellis Air Force Base, Nevada.

The 57 WG's mission is to provide well trained and well equipped combat forces ready to deploy into a combat arena to conduct integrated combat operations.

== Mission ==
The 57 WG is home to advanced air combat training. The wing provides training for composite strike forces which include every type of aircraft in the USAF inventory. Training is conducted in conjunction with air and ground units of the U.S. Army, U.S. Navy, U.S. Marine Corps and air forces from US allied nations. The crews do not come to learn how to fly, but instead learn how to be combat aviators.

== Units ==
The wing was reorganized in 2005 to reflect its current structure.

- 57th Operations Group (57 OG) (tail code: WA [the code for the 57th Wing])

The 57th OG consists of Aggressor squadrons that replicate adversary threat tactics while training combat air forces aircrews.
64th Aggressor Squadron: 15 Sep 2005 – present
65th Aggressor Squadron: 9 June 2022 – present
57th Adversary Tactics Support Squadron
57th Information Aggressor Squadron
507th Air Defense Aggressor Squadron
547th Intelligence Squadron

- USAF Weapons School

Composed of 16 squadrons, the U.S. Air Force Weapons School teaches graduate-level instructor courses that provide advanced training in weapons and tactics employment to officers of the combat air forces.

- USAF Air Demonstration Squadron - The Thunderbirds

"America's Ambassadors in Blue," the Thunderbirds have performed for more than 300 million people in all 50 states and 60 countries around the world.

- 57th Maintenance Group

USAF's most diverse maintenance group with over 2,200 Airmen, civilians and contractors in 3 squadrons, 8 Aircraft Maintenance Units, 13 flying hour programs and Air Combat Command's largest A-76 backshop service provider contract worth over $230M. Provides sortie generation, munitions and on- and off-equipment maintenance for 132 assigned A-10 Thunderbolt II, F-15 Eagle, F-15E Strike Eagle, F-16 Fighting Falcon, F-35A Lightning II and F-22A Raptor aircraft to support the test, tactics and training missions.

- United States Air Force Advanced Maintenance and Munitions Operations School

Provides graduate-level instruction to maintenance and munitions officers and senior non-commissioned officers to perform as expert field level logistics leaders.

The Thunderbirds and the USAF Advanced Maintenance and Munitions Operations School report directly to the 57th Wing commander.

== History ==
See 57th Operations Group for complete lineage and timeline information.
See 57th Adversary Tactics Group and USAF Weapons School for the flying components of the 57th Wing.
See USAF Air Demonstration Squadron for the United States Air Force Thunderbirds.

Established on 15 March 1948, the 57th Fighter Wing replaced 57th Fighter Wing (Provisional) in April 1948. It operated Elmendorf AFB, Alaska, and several satellite bases, and provided air defense of Alaska, April 1948-December 1950. In addition, the wing provided intra-theater troop carrier and airlift support, 1948–1950, using several attached troop carrier squadrons. In January 1951, it was replaced by 39th Air Depot Wing.

The 57th moved to Nevada and replaced the 4525th Fighter Weapons Wing at Nellis Air Force Base, in October 1969. At Nellis, it trained tactical fighter aircrews, conducted operational tests and evaluations, demonstrated tactical fighter weapon systems, and developed fighter tactics and from February 1970 to October 1979 and operated Nellis AFB for all base tenants. The USAF Air Demonstration Squadron (the "Thunderbirds") was assigned to the wing in February 1974 and has remained an integral part of the wing to present. The 57th assumed operational control of "Red Flag" exercises in October 1979; developing realistic combat training operations featuring adversary tactics, dissimilar air combat training, and electronic warfare. It incorporated intelligence training after March 1980. In 1990 the aggressor mission transferred to 4440th TFTG and later to the 414th CTS. The wing added instruction in hunter/killer counter electronic warfare tactics until 1996.

=== Modern era ===
From 1992–1999, the wing operated detachments at Cannon AFB, New Mexico, Ellsworth AFB, South Dakota, and Barksdale AFB, Louisiana, that flew and tested the F-111 Aardvark, Rockwell B-1B Lancer and B-52 Stratofortress respectively. It added the 66th Rescue Squadron, equipped with HH-60 helicopters, on 1 February 1993, while the squadron was deployed in Southwest Asia. From 1991 to present, the 57th provided combat aircrew capabilities, operating the USAF Weapons and the USAF Combat Rescue Schools, developing techniques and procedures and conducting operational test and evaluation on all major aircraft in the AF inventory.

With the reactivation of the 432d Wing at Creech Air Force Base on 1 May 2007, the elements that comprised the 57th Operations Group, were transferred to the 432nd Wing.

The 57th Adversary Tactics Group, which was established in 2005, merged into the 57th Operations Group on 31 March 2020.

=== Lineage ===
- Established as 57th Fighter Wing c. 15 March 1948 (Note: The 57th Fighter Wing (Provisional) was organized on 16 April 1947 at Fort Richardson, Alaska, as one of the Wing Base organizations. The provisional wing was discontinued and replaced by the 57th Fighter Wing in March 1948.)

Organized on 20 April 1948
Redesignated 57th Fighter-Interceptor Wing on 20 January 1950
Inactivated on 1 January 1951
Redesignated 57th Fighter Weapons Wing on 22 August 1969
Activated on 15 October 1969 by redesignation of 4525th Fighter Weapons Wing
Redesignated: 57th Tactical Training Wing on 1 April 1977
Redesignated: 57th Fighter Weapons Wing on 1 March 1980
Redesignated: 57th Fighter Wing on 1 October 1991
Redesignated: 57th Wing on 15 June 1993.

=== Assignments ===
- Alaskan Air Command, 20 April 1948 – 1 January 1951
- USAF Tactical Fighter Weapons (later, USAF Fighter Weapons; USAF Weapons and Tactics; Air Warfare) Center, 15 October 1969–present

=== Components ===
Groups

- 57th Fighter (later, 57th Fighter-Interceptor; 57th Operations)

20 April 1948 – 1 January 1951 (detached 10 December 1950 – 1 January 1951)
1 November 1991 –

- 57th Adversary Tactics Group, 1 July 2005–present
- 57th Test Group: 1 November 1991 – 1 October 1996
- 4440th Tactical Fighter Training Group (Red Flag)

Attached 1 October 1979 – 28 February 1980
Assigned 1 March 1980 – 1 November 1991

- 4443d Tactical Training Group: 26 January 1990 – 1 November 1991.

Squadrons

- 4th Troop Carrier Squadron: attached 2 Dec 1948-28 Feb 1949 and 14 Aug-14 Nov 1949
- 7th Troop Carrier Squadron: attached 28 Feb-1 Jun 1949
- 8th Troop Carrier Squadron: attached 1 Sep-2 Dec 1948 and 1 Jun-15 Aug 1949
- 37th Troop Carrier Squadron: attached 4 Jul-1 Sep 1948
- 54th Troop Carrier Squadron: attached c. 20 Apr-c. 1 Jul 1948 and 20 Sep 1949 – 31 Dec 1950
- 64th Fighter Weapons (later, 64th Tactical Fighter Training Aggressor; 64th Aggressor) Squadron: 15 Oct 1972 – 5 Oct 1990.
- 65th Fighter Weapons (later, 65th Tactical Fighter Training Aggressor; 65th Aggressor) Squadron: 15 Oct 1969 – 7 Apr 1989
- 66th Fighter Weapons Squadron: 15 Oct 1969 – 30 Dec 1981
- 414th Fighter Weapons Squadron: 15 Oct 1969 – 30 Dec 1981
- 422d Fighter Weapons (later, 422d Test and Evaluation) Squadron: 15 Oct 1969 – 1 Nov 1991
- 431st Fighter Weapons (later, 431st Test and Evaluation) Squadron: 1 Oct 1980 – 1 Nov 1991
- 433d Fighter Weapons Squadron: 1 Oct 1976 – 30 Dec 1981
- 509th Weapons Squadron: 2006 – present. Located at Fairchild AFB WA.
- 4460th Helicopter Squadron: 1 Nov 1983 – 1 Jun 1985
- 4477th Test and Evaluation Flight (later, 4477 Test and Evaluation Squadron) Squadron: 1 Apr 1977 – 15 Jul 1990.
- USAF Air Demonstration Squadron: 15 Feb 1974 – present

Schools

- USAF Fighter Weapons (later, USAF Weapons) School: 30 December 1981 – present
- USAF Combat Rescue School: 2 July 1993 – 15 July 1995.

=== Stations ===
- Elmendorf Air Force Base, Alaska, 20 April 1948 – 1 January 1951
- Nellis Air Force Base, Nevada, 15 October 1969–present

=== Aircraft operated ===
- P-51 Mustang (1948)
- P-80 Shooting Star (1948–1950)
- C-47 Skytrain (1948)
- C-54 Skymaster (1948–1950)
- A-7 Corsair II (1969–1975)
- F-4 Phantom II (1969–1985, 1993–1995)
- F-100 Super Sabre (1969)
- F-105 Thunderchief (1969–1975)
- F-111 Aardvark (1969–1995)
- T-39 Sabreliner (1969–1972)
- T-38 Talon (1972–1990)
- F-5 Freedom Fighter (1975–1989)
- F-15 Eagle (1976 – present)
- A-10 Thunderbolt II (1977 – present)
- F-16 Falcon (1980 – present)
- UH-1 Iroquois (1981–1985)
- B-1 Lancer (1993–1999)
- B-52 Stratofortress (1993–1999)
- HH-60 Pave Hawk (1993 – present)
- MQ-1 Predator (1995–2007)
- KC-135R Stratotanker (2006-)
- MQ-9 Reaper (2007-)
- F-22 Raptor (2010-)
- F-35 (2013-)

== List of commanders ==
Brig Gen Joel T. Hall

- Brig Gen Joseph W. Ashy, May 1984
- Brig Gen Stephen L. Hoog
- Brig Gen Russell J. Handy, 18 January 2008
- Brig Gen Terrence J. O'Shaughnessy, 16 July 2010
- Brig Gen Charles L. Moore Jr., 26 March 2012
- Brig Gen Christopher M. Short, 28 February 2014
- Brig Gen Jeannie Leavitt, 15 April 2016
- Brig Gen Robert Novotny, 8 June 2018
- Brig Gen Michael Drowley, 7 August 2020
- Brig Gen Richard Goodman, 30 June 2022
- Brig Gen Lawrence Sullivan, June 2024
- Brig Gen Scott Mills, 15 June 2026 — present
