= Lonnie R. Moore =

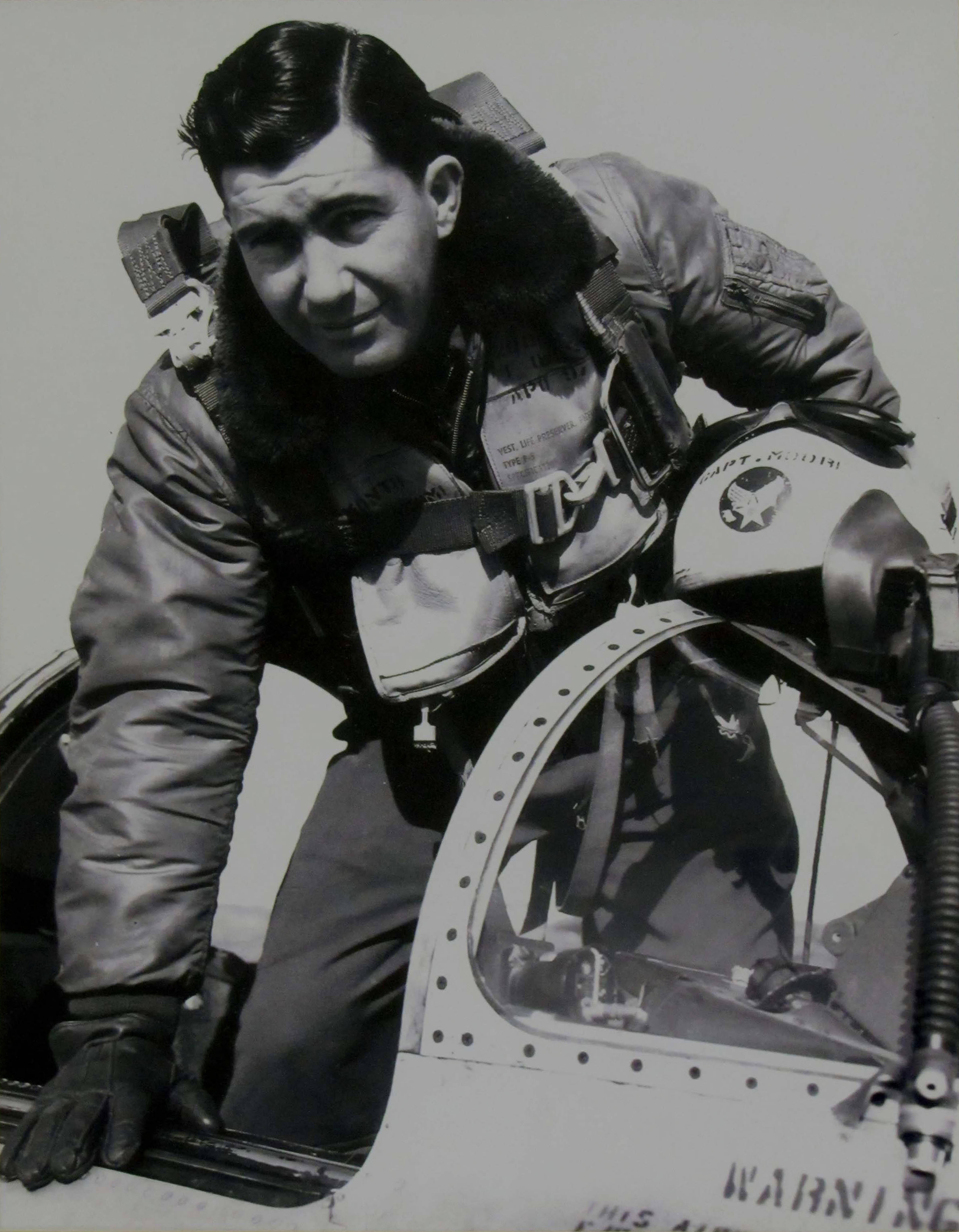
- Lonnie R. Moore in the early 1950s
- Born: July 13, 1920; Groesbeck, Texas, US
- Died: January 10, 1956 (aged 35); Eglin Air Force Base, Florida, US
- Burial place: Fort Sam Houston National Cemetery
- Military career
- Allegiance: United States
- Branch: United States Army Air Forces; United States Air Force
- Rank: Major
- Conflicts: World War II; Korean War
- Awards: Distinguished Service Cross; Silver Star; Distinguished Flying Cross (3); Bronze Star Medal; Air Medal (15)

Lonnie R. Moore (13 July 1920 – 10 January 1956) was a United States military aviator who flew 54 combat missions in Martin B-26 Marauders during World War II, and whom became a double jet ace during the Korean War, downing ten MiG-15s and one probable while flying North American F-86 Sabres. He was killed in the crash of a new fighter type at Eglin AFB, Florida, at age 35.

== Biography ==
Lonnie Raymond Moore was a native of Groesbeck and San Antonio, Texas, the son of Joseph Benjamin (J. B.) and Lillie Toten Moore of that city.

During World War II, Moore piloted Martin B-26 Marauder medium bombers of the 596th Bomb Squadron (Medium), 397th Bomb Group (Medium), in the European Theatre of Operations, flying 54 missions, and being downed twice. In both cases, he evaded capture to return to duty. On 2 December 1944, Moore and his crew bailed out of B-26G-5-MA, 43-34290, over Nogent sur Vernisson, France, after an engine caught fire.

In the post-war era, he transitioned to fighter aircraft. As a captain, he was assigned to the Air Proving Ground Command at Eglin AFB, Florida, in 1951, where he served as a project officer during the Korean War, deploying TDY to Korea to perform a test under combat conditions with the 335th Fighter-Interceptor Squadron, 4th Fighter-Interceptor Wing in the modified F-86F-2 Sabre, upgunned with the M39 cannon. During the test mission he downed two MiG-15s with the new weapon. Remaining in Korea after the test was completed, he flew 100 combat missions, destroying ten MiGs, plus one probable. On 30 April 1953, on his 54th mission, Moore was forced to bail out of disabled F-86F-2, 51–2803, due to an engine stall following cannon-firing, approximately 20 miles north of Ch'o Do Island, coming down in the Yellow Sea. He was plucked from the water as soon as he got out of his parachute harness by a YH-19 helicopter of the 3d Air Rescue Squadron that had monitored his descent.

Moore scored his fifth aerial victory on 18 June 1953.

Returning to Eglin by the last quarter of 1953, Moore was one of seven fighter pilots "who made exceptional records in Korea" profiled by Collier's Magazine in the October issue. Moore served as the Air Force Operational Test Center's chief project officer for operational suitability tests of the Air Force's first supersonic jet fighter, the F-100A Super Sabre, in 1954, and the F-100C, from October 1955, on which test program Moore served as senior project officer, from April 1955.

== Death ==
On 10 January 1956, Moore was killed in the take-off crash of an F-101A-15-MC Voodoo, 53-2443, from Eglin AFB. Moore was making his first flight in the new fighter design but the jet pitched up and crashed in the center of the airfield just after becoming airborne, appearing to explode on impact. Although the crash site was only 200 yards (180 m) from the fire station, and the blaze extinguished within three minutes, the pilot had no chance to escape and was killed. He was survived by his widow, the former Billie Geneva Hall, (also reported as Billie Geneeva Hall) of Dallas, Texas, and five children, Robert Barnes, 15; Barbara W., 13; Lonnie R. Jr., 7; Tina Gail, 3 1/2 and Steven Scott, 20 months old. Moore had been a resident of Fort Walton Beach, Florida for five years. He is buried at Fort Sam Houston National Cemetery.

At the time of his death, Moore had more than 1,500 hours in single-engine jet aircraft and 3,570 total flight hours, 328 of them in combat.

== Honors and awards ==
Moore held 14 decorations, including the Nation's second highest award, the Distinguished Service Cross, plus the Silver Star, the Distinguished Flying Cross with two oak clusters, the Bronze Star and the Air Medal with 14 clusters.

'

Senior Pilot Badge
Distinguished Service Cross		Silver Star
Distinguished Flying Cross with two bronze oak leaf clusters	Bronze Star Medal	Air Medal with two silver and two bronze oak leaf clusters
Air Medal with bronze oak leaf cluster (second ribbon required for accouterment spacing)	Air Force Presidential Unit Citation	Air Force Outstanding Unit Award
American Campaign Medal	European-African-Middle Eastern Campaign Medal with four bronze campaign stars	World War II Victory Medal
National Defense Service Medal	Korean Service Medal with three bronze campaign stars	Air Force Longevity Service Award with two bronze oak leaf clusters
Republic of Korea Presidential Unit Citation	United Nations Service Medal for Korea	Korean War Service Medal

=== Distinguished Service Cross citation ===
The President of the United States of America, under the provisions of the Act of Congress approved July 9, 1918, takes pleasure in presenting the Distinguished Service Cross (Air Force) to Captain Lonnie Raymond Moore, United States Air Force, for extraordinary heroism in connection with military operations against an armed enemy of the United Nations while serving as Pilot of an F-86 aircraft, 335th Fighter-Interceptor Squadron, 4th Fighter-Interceptor Wing, Fifth Air Force, in action against enemy forces in the Republic of Korea on 12 July 1953. On that date, Captain Moore led a flight of four F-86s screening for friendly fighter bombers operating immediately south of the Yalu River. Because of fuel shortage his second element had to return to base. Continuing the escort, Captain Moore and his wingman, although dangerously low on fuel, sighted a formation of twenty enemy aircraft positioning to attack the friendly fighter bombers. With utter disregard for his personal safety, Captain Moore dived upon the lead MIG of the enemy formation and leveled out in firing range of eighteen enemy aircraft, thereby exposing himself to their concentrated fire. With heroic disregard for the hail of enemy cannon fire from behind, Captain Moore closed upon the enemy formation leader, and after a violent engagement, shot down the lead enemy aircraft. Captain Moore and his wingman, although under vicious attack and surrounded by numerous enemy aircraft, fought with great courage and tenacity. In the course of this engagement, while under continuous enemy fire, Captain Moore again maneuvered into position and destroyed a second MIG-15, as his wingman was destroying a third enemy aircraft. The enemy's formation was so disrupted and the enemy pilots so demoralized by Captain Moore's daring and aggressive destruction of their leader and another MIG that the tide of battle was turned and the enemy retreated in confusion across the Yalu River. Through his extraordinary heroism and flying skill in the face of great personal risk, Captain Moore was instrumental in enabling the friendly fighter bombers to complete a mission vital to the success of the United Nations war effort. Having overstayed his maximum time during this encounter, Captain Moore had insufficient fuel remaining to return to his base and was forced to land on an emergency strip at Paengnyong-do. Through his extraordinary heroism, his peerless leadership, courage and unselfish devotion to duty, Captain Moore reflected great credit upon himself, the Far East Air Forces and the United States Air Force.
