= 58th Rescue Squadron =

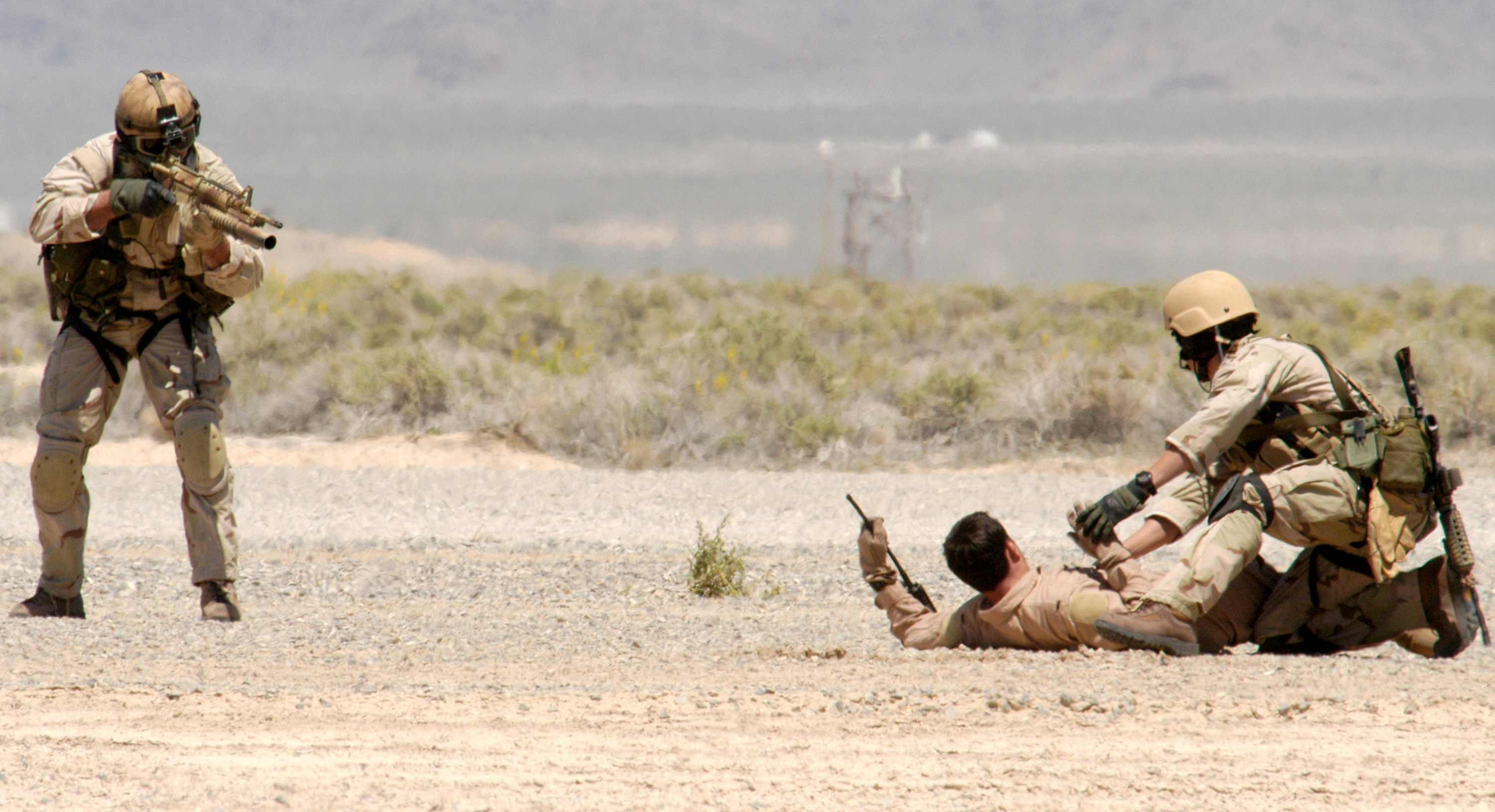
- Pararescuemen from the 58th exercise recovering a downed pilot
- Active: 1952–1960; 1961–1970; 2002–2025
- Country: United States
- Branch: United States Air Force
- Role: Search and Rescue
- Mottos: Courage and Honor
- Decorations: Presidential Unit Citation; Navy Meritorious Unit Commendation; Air Force Outstanding Unit Award

Insignia
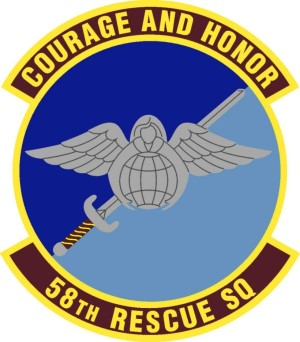
- 58th Rescue Squadron emblem (Note: Approved c. 2007.)

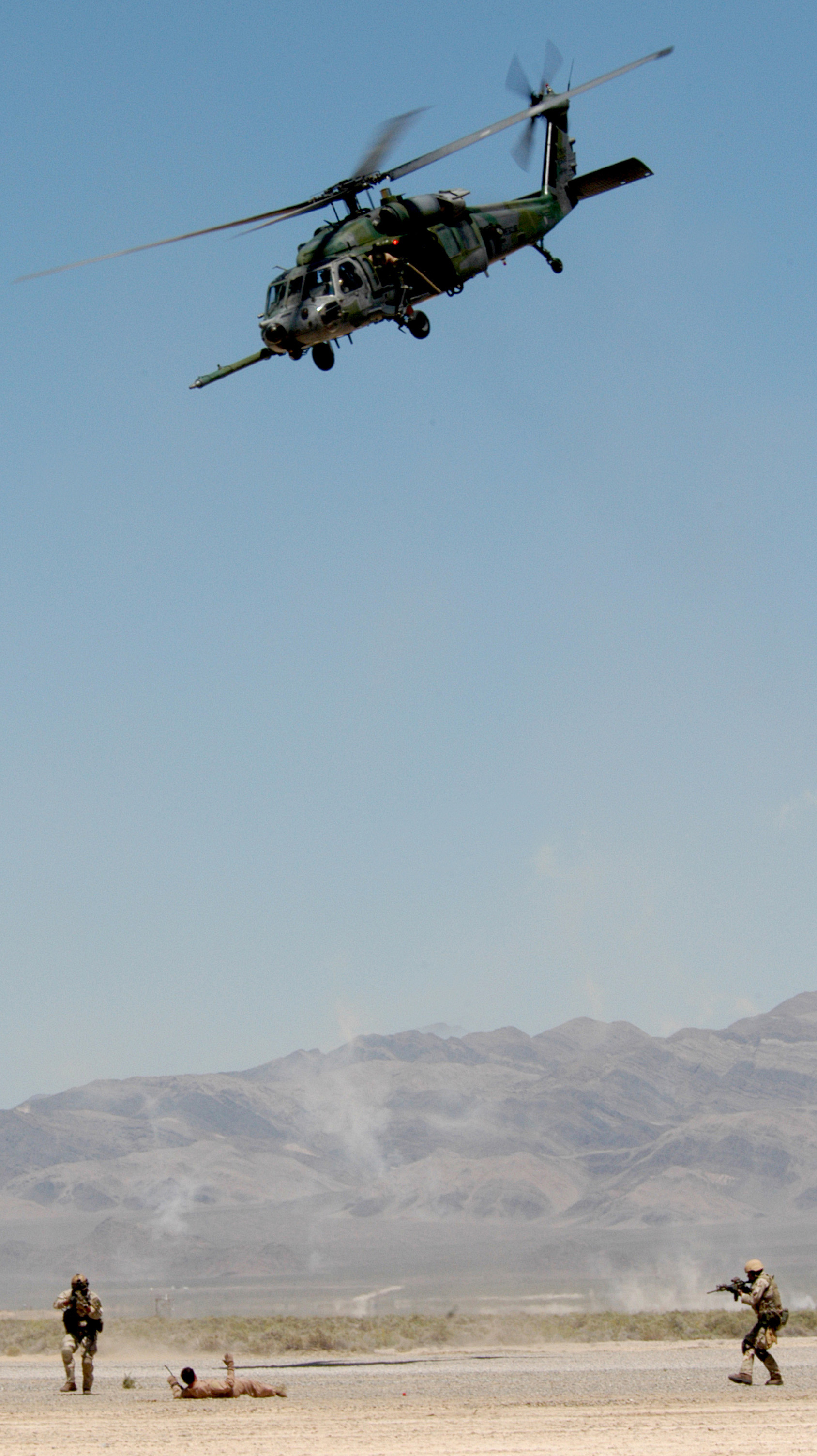
Pararescuemen from the 58 RQS participate in an exercise at Nellis AFB.

The 58th Rescue Squadron was one of five active-duty squadrons under the command of the 563rd Rescue Group at Davis-Monthan Air Force Base, Arizona but located at Operating Site Alpha, Nellis Air Force Base, Nevada. The squadron was inactivated c. 18 June 2025 at Nellis Air Force Base, Nevada.

== History ==
=== Rescue in North Africa ===
In the fall of 1952, Air Rescue Service, expanded its existing squadrons to groups. Its 7th Air Rescue Squadron, which had responsibility for rescue support in an area stretching from the middle Atlantic and across North Africa to the Middle East, became the 7th Air Rescue Group. Air Rescue Service formed new squadrons, which replaced existing flights of the old squadrons. The 58th Air Rescue Squadron was activated at Wheelus Air Base, Libya, where it assumed the mission and took over the resources of Flight E, 6th Air Rescue Squadron.

The 58th flew search and rescue in parts of the Middle East, Africa, and Southern Europe, especially at the El Uotia Gunnery Range in Libya. It was briefly inactive from September 1960 until June 1961. It also stood downrange alert during crewed space missions, performed some overwater escort, and provided humanitarian aid during natural disasters. In September 1969, a coup led by Muammar Gaddafi replaced the Kingdom of Libya with the Libyan Arab Republic. The new republic terminated American base rights in Libya and the squadron was inactivated.

=== Guardian Angel ===
Until about 2000, Air Force rescue units were frequently composite units (as shown by the number of fixed- and rotary-wing aircraft flown by the squadron at Wheelus). At that time, rescue units were organized as fixed-wing, helicopter, or pararescue units. The squadron, now the 58th Rescue Squadron, was activated at Nellis Air Force Base, Nevada, in June 2002 as a pararescue squadron, often called a "Guardian Angel" squadron. The squadron possesses no aircraft; its rescue personnel fly on the helicopters of the 66th Rescue Squadron. Its inactivation was marked by ceremonies at Nellis on 18 June 2025.

In April 2026, the squadron was awarded a Presidential Unit Citation for its actions between 16 July and 1 August 2021, when it was part of the Personnel Recovery Task Force that evacuated U.S. and Afghan noncombatants following the collapse of the Afghan government. Operating from Hamid Karzai International Airport, the task force saved more than 1,900 Americans and Afghans and established a safe evacuation path for more than 12,000 additional Afghan refugees. It assisted in locating and tracking American citizens, Afghan refugees, and other country nationals being evacuated aboard C-17s.

== Lineage ==
- Constituted as the 58th Air Rescue Squadron on 17 October 1952

Activated on 14 November 1952
Discontinued on 18 September 1960
Organized on 18 June 1961
Redesignated 58th Aerospace Rescue and Recovery Squadron on 8 January 1966
Inactivated on 15 February 1970
Redesignated 58th Rescue Squadron on 30 May 2002
Activated on 14 June 2002
Inactivated c. 18 June 2025

=== Assignments ===
- 7th Air Rescue Group, 14 November 1952 (attached for operational control to Headquarters United States Air Forces Europe (USAFE), until 15 November 1953, to Seventeenth Air Force until 1 August 1954, USAFE, until unknown date)
- 12th Air Rescue Group, 8 December 1956
- Air Rescue Service, 18 Feb 1958 – 18 September 1960
- Air Rescue Service (later Aerospace Rescue and Recovery Service), 18 June 1961
- Atlantic Rescue and Recovery Center (later 40 Aerospace Rescue and Recovery Wing), 1 April 1967 – 15 February 1970
- 57th Operations Group, 14 June 2002
- 563rd Rescue Group, 1 October 2003 – c. 18 June 2025

=== Stations ===
- Wheelus Air Base, Libya, 14 November 1952 – 18 September 1960
- Wheelus Air Base, Libya, 18 June 1961 – 15 February 1970
- Nellis Air Force Base, Nevada, 14 June 2002 – c. 18 June 2025

=== Aircraft ===
- Sikorsky H-5 Dragonfly (1952–1953)
- Grumman SA-16 Albatross (later HU-16) (1952–1960, 1961–1968)
- Fairchild C-82 Packet (1952–1953)
- Douglas SC-47 Skytrain (1953–1956)
- Sikorsky H-19 (also SH-19 (later HH-19)) (1953–1960, 1961–1963)
- Douglas SC-54 Skymaster (later HC-54) (1957–1960, 1961–1964)
- Kaman HH-43 Huskie (1963–1970)
- Boeing KC-97 Stratofreighter (1964)
- Boeing HC-97 Stratofreighter (1964–1966, 1968)
- Lockheed HC-130 Hercules (1966–1967)
- Sikorsky HH-3 Jolly Green Giant (1968–1969)

== See also ==
- History of Libya under Muammar Gaddafi
