= Wheelus Air Base =

Former US airbase in Libya

- IATA: MJI; ICAO: HLLM

Summary
- Airport type: Military
- Operator: United States Air Force
- Location: Tripoli, Libya
- Elevation AMSL: 36 ft (11 m)
- Coordinates: 32°53′42″N 13°16′49″E

Map
- Location within Libya

Runways
Direction	Length		Surface
Direction	ft	m	Surface
03/21	6,000	1,829	Asphalt
11/29	11,076	3,376	Asphalt

Wheelus Air Base was a United States Air Force base located in British-occupied Libya and the Kingdom of Libya from 1943 to 1970. Wheelus Air Base was originally built by the Italian Royal Air Force in 1923 and was known as Mellaha Air Base.

At one time Wheelus AB was the largest US military facility outside the US. It had an area of 52 km^{2} (20 sq mi) on the coast of Tripoli. It had a beach club, the largest military hospital outside the US, a multiplex cinema, a bowling alley and a high school for 500 students. The base had a radio and TV station, a shopping mall and fast food outlets. At its height, over 15,000 military personnel and their dependents lived at the base.

Today the facility is known as Mitiga International Airport.

== World War II ==
The airfield was constructed in 1923 and used by the Regia Aeronautica (Royal Italian Air Force). In 1933 the roads around the airfield and the neighbouring Mellaha Lake became the home for the Tripoli Grand Prix motor race.

Mellaha was used by the German Luftwaffe during the North African Campaign for short-range reconnaissance units, and coastal and naval reconnaissance units. Special weather reconnaissance units were also based at Mehalla. The main Luftwaffe unit stationed at the base was the 2nd Staffel of the Aufklärungsgruppe (H) 14 or 2.(H)/14.

The squadron was equipped with 12 single-engine Henschel Hs 126, an aircraft with 2-man crews, which could cover approx 710 km, with a maximum speed of 360 km/h, as well as three Fieseler Fi 156 Storch liaison aircraft, and a Junkers Ju 52 for transport of men and materiel.

The airfield was captured by the British Eighth Army in January 1943. The United States Army Air Forces began using Mellaha the same month. It was used by the 376th Bombardment Group (Heavy) of the 12th Air Force to launch Consolidated B-24 Liberators to bomb Italy and southern parts of Germany.

In addition, Mellaha Field was used by Air Transport Command. It functioned as a stopover en route to Benina Airport near Benghazi or to Tunis Airport, Tunisia on the North African Cairo-Dakar transport route for cargo, transiting aircraft and personnel.

On 15 April 1945, Mellaha AAF was taken over by USAAF’s Air Training Command. It was renamed Wheelus Army Air Field (AAF) on 17 May 1945 in honor of USAAF Lieutenant Richard Wheelus who had died earlier that year in a plane crash in Iran.

== Cold War usage by the USAF ==
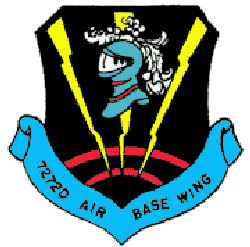

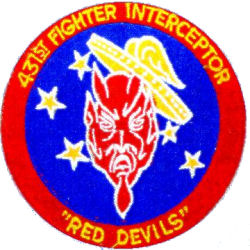

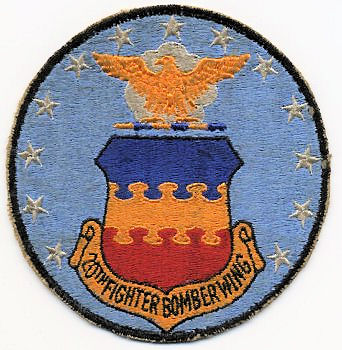

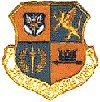

Wheelus AAF was closed on 15 May 1947, then reopened as Wheelus Air Base (Wheelus AB) on 1 June 1948 and transferred to the USAF Military Air Transportation Service (MATS). Its host unit under MATS was the 1603rd Air Transport Wing.

With the crowning of Idris I in 1951, United States Air Forces in Europe (USAFE)-based fighter-bomber units also began using Wheelus AB and its nearby El Uotia Gunnery Range for gunnery and bombing training. A further agreement between the United States and Libya, signed in 1954, granted the US the use of Wheelus and its gunnery range until December 1971.

With its 4,600 Americans, the US Ambassador to Libya once called it "a Little America...on the sparkling shores of the Mediterranean," although temperatures at the base frequently reached 110 to 120 degrees Fahrenheit (43 to 50 degrees Celsius).

=== Military Air Transport Service use ===
MATS activated the 1603rd Air Transport Wing at Wheelus on 1 June 1948. The wing flew Douglas C-47 Skytrain and C-54s to Egypt, Saudi Arabia, and Cyprus, and operated the base transport control center until 1952.

Headquarters, 7th Air Rescue Group, was assigned to Wheelus along with the 58th Air Rescue Squadron at about this time. They flew SA-16s and H-19s. The 56th Air Rescue Squadron, stationed at Sidi Slimane, Morocco, the 57th Air Rescue Squadron stationed at Lajes Field, Azores, and the 59th Air Rescue Squadron, stationed at Dhahran Air Base, Saudi Arabia, were also part of the group.

The 58th Aerospace Rescue and Recovery Squadron operated out of Wheelus until 1970 when they were relocated to the 67th ARRSQ in the UK. The 58 ARRS flew three HH-3E Jolly Green Giant helicopters, and three HC-130 refueling tankers.

MATS aircraft and personnel from Wheelus participated in Operation Hajji Baba in 1952. Also in 1952 the MATS 580th Air Resupply and Communications Wing was reassigned to Wheelus from Mountain Home Air Force Base, Idaho. The Wing (later Group) flew special operations in the Mediterranean, Middle East and Southwest Asia until being inactivated in 1956.

The MATS presence was withdrawn and relocated to Rhein-Main Air Base, West Germany in January 1953. MATS and later Military Airlift Command aircraft were frequent visitors at Wheelus and maintained a small detachment there until the base's closure in 1970.

=== Strategic Air Command use ===
As the Cold War overtook post-Second World War international politics, on 16 November 1950 USAF's Strategic Air Command began deploying B-50s, B-36s, B-47s and support aircraft (KB-29, KB-50, and KC-97 tankers) from US air bases to Wheelus. The base became one of several SAC forward operating locations in North Africa, becoming a vital link in SAC war plans for use as a bomber, tanker refueling and reconnaissance-fighter base.

Wheelus hosted SAC bomber deployments in 45-day rotational deployments, using Wheelus as a staging area for planned strikes against the Soviet Union.

SAC's use of Wheelus continued until 1970, when as part of the USAF withdrawal from the base, its rotational deployments ended.

=== USAFE use ===
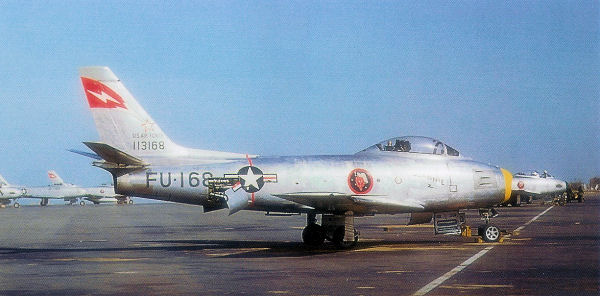
North American F-86F-20-NH Sabre AF Serial No. 51-13168 of the 431st FIS.

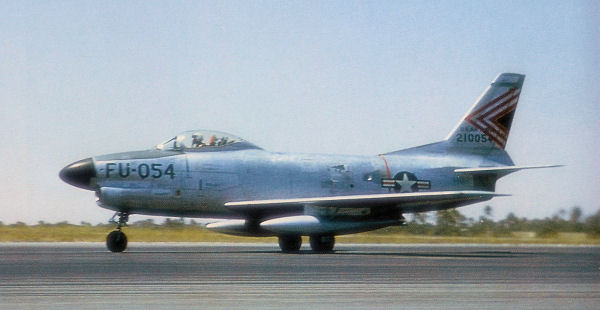
North American F-86D-50-NA Sabre AF Serial No. 52-10054 of the 431st FIS.

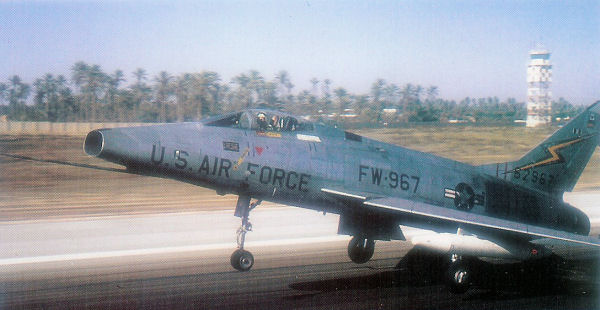
North American F-100D-65-NA Super Sabre AF Serial No. 56-2967 of the 20th FBW at Wheelus AB.

Wheelus AB was reassigned from MATS to United States Air Forces in Europe (USAFE) on 16 October 1951, under USAFE's 7272nd Air Base Wing. The 7272nd was later designated the 7272nd Fighter Training Wing and became the host unit at Wheelus AB until the base's closure on 11 June 1970.

The 431st Fighter-Interceptor Squadron was activated when the 107th Fighter Squadron of the Michigan Air National Guard was ordered to active duty in June 1953. The squadron was reassigned from Selfridge Air Force Base and deployed to Wheelus, where it was equipped with 25 F-86Fs, two T-33s, and one Douglas C-47. The squadron insignia adorned each side of the center fuselage, over the wing. The tail markings consisted of a red-and-white comet design on the vertical tail. A white lightning flash decorated the red portion of the comet's tail.

In January 1955 the F-86D began to replace the F-86Fs, which were sent to smaller NATO air forces. The squadron's tail markings changed with the F-86Ds having two or three horizontal red chevrons starting at the base of the rudder, with the chevron point touching the vertical fin's leading edge and angling towards the upper trailing edge of the rudder. Inside the rearmost chevron was a solid blue triangle. In September 1958, the 431st FIS moved to Zaragoza Air Base, Spain, and was transferred from USAFE to SAC's 16th Air Force.

On 1 August 1956, the Headquarters of 17th Air Force moved to Wheelus Air Base, Libya, from Rabat, Morocco, where it remained until relocating to Ramstein Air Base, Germany, on 15 November 1959.

=== Annual Missile Launch Operation (AMLO) ===
The expanse of Libyan desert was used first by the 701st TMW, then later its successor, the 38th Tactical Missile Wing, United States Air Forces in Europe (USAFE), beginning in October 1954, with three separate live launch operations for all of the operational squadrons using the TM-61 Matador. Operations Suntan (October 1954), Sunburst (June 1955), and Sunflash (March 1956) became annual qualification firings for all Matador squadrons based in Europe. There were 36 Matador launches from Wheelus in 1957, while there were only 13 launches at Cape Canaveral and only 25 from Holloman AFB in Alamogordo, New Mexico during the same time.

The 1958 exercise from 6 October through 19 November, called "Operation Marblehead," took 19 C-130 Hercules and seven C-124 Globemasters just to move the 339 personnel and equipment of the 71st TMS from Bitburg to Wheelus and back. C-47 twin engined transports carried personnel back and forth as well. Not only did the 71st take 13 missiles and the required launchers and checkout vans, but also two complete MSQ units, plus personnel to back up the two Shanicle base units that were permanently installed at Wheelus. The exercise was followed by similar deployments from Hahn Air Base, and later Sembach Air Base, all units of the newly formed 38th TMW. The exercises were moved to Patrick AFB, FL, in 1959 for launches at Cape Canaveral.

The missile launch area was located 24 km (15 mi) east of Tripoli, the remote southern section of the base, away from flight operations.

=== Detachment 1, 20th Fighter-Bomber Wing ===
The 20th Fighter-Bomber Wing, based at RAF Wethersfield UK, established an operational detachment at Wheelus AB, in February 1958. This detachment managed the USAFE Weapons Training Center for month-long squadron rotations by the Europe-based USAFE tactical fighter wings.

USAFE units from Europe such as the 36th and 49th TFW's with their F-84 "Thunderjets"; the 32nd (Soesterberg, the Netherlands); 431st (Zaragoza, Spain) and 497th (Torrejón, Spain) fighter-interceptor (FIS) squadrons with F-102 Delta Daggers and the 50th TFW with F-100 Super Sabres practiced weapons delivery and use at Wheelus. In addition, the United Kingdom based 20th and 48th TFWs with F-100Ds, and the 81st TFW trained in air-to-air and air-to-ground gunnery and delivery of conventional ordnance and nuclear "shapes" at the weapons range about 10 nautical miles (19 km) further east of the air base.

As the McDonnell Douglas F-4 Phantom II replaced most USAFE fighters in the 1960s, Phantom detachments became the predominant activity at Wheelus. USAFE's use of Wheelus continued until 1970, when as part of the USAF withdrawal from the base, desert weapons range training ended.

=== United States withdrawal ===
Oil was discovered in Libya in 1959, and what had been one of the world's poorest countries became comparatively wealthy. The US continued a generally warm relationship with Libya and pursued policies centered on interests in operations at Wheelus Air Base and the considerable US oil interests. During the early 1960s, many children of US oil personnel sent to develop the oil field installations and pipelines were allowed to attend the high school at Wheelus, typically riding buses from residential areas in or near Tripoli. Classes often had to pause briefly while large aircraft were taking off.

The value of the installation had declined with the development of long-range nuclear missiles that had effectively replaced many bombers. Thus Wheelus served primarily as a tactical fighter training facility through the 1960s.

In September 1969 King Idris I was overthrown by a group of military officers centered around Muammar Gaddafi. Before the revolution, the US and Libya had already reached an agreement on US withdrawal from Wheelus. This proceeded according to plan, and the facility was turned over to the new Libyan authorities on 11 June 1970.

== After 1970 ==
Following the US withdrawal, the base was renamed Okba Ben Nafi Airfield (seemingly after the legendary hero Uqba ibn Nafi) and was used by the Soviet Union, as well as served as the headquarters for the Libyan Air Force. The base was bombed by the US in 1986 during Operation El Dorado Canyon.

The airfield was subsequently renamed Mitiga International Airport.
