= Chodo Airport =

Airport in North Korea

Ch'o do Airport
- IATA: none; ICAO: none

Summary
- Airport type: Military
- Serves: Ch'odo, North Korea
- Elevation AMSL: 0 ft (0 m)
- Coordinates: 38°33′07.30″N 124°49′57.20″E

Map
- Location within North Korea Location within Asia Location within North Pacific Location within Earth

Runways
Direction	Length		Surface
Direction	ft	m	Surface
11/29	3,020	920	Grass

- Chodo Airport
- Hangul: 초도기지
- Hanja: 椒島基地
- RR: Chodo giji
- MR: Ch'odo kiji

Ch'o do Airport is an airport in Ch'odo island, Hanggu-guyok, Nampo, South Pyongan Province, North Korea.

== Facilities ==
The airfield has a single grass runway 11/29 measuring 3020 x 141 feet (920 x 43 m). However, other sources state the airfield is 3500 feet long. It is sited on Ch'o do island off the west coast of North Korea in the Korea Bay.

== History ==
=== Korean War ===
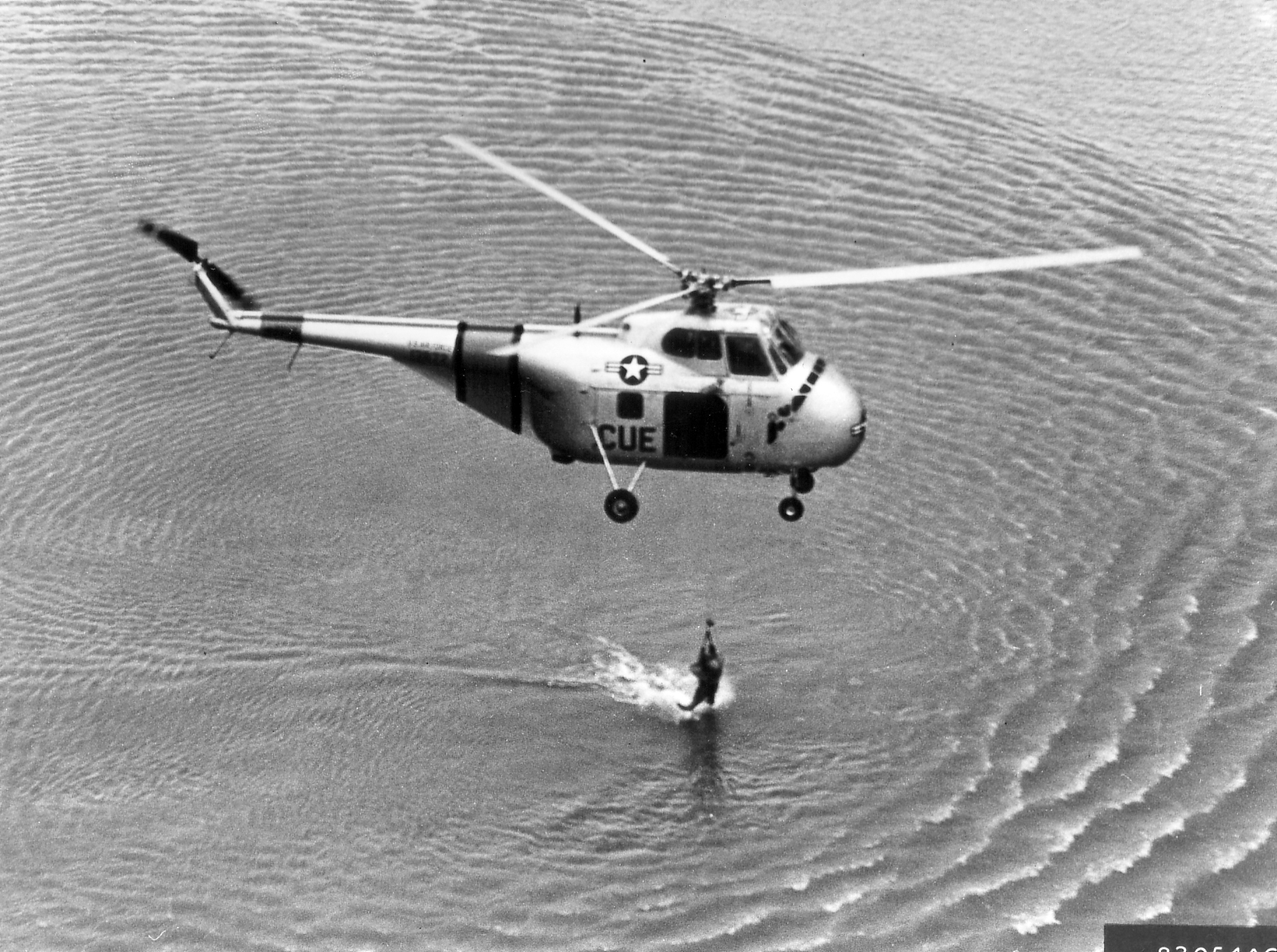
A 3d Air Rescue Squadron H-19 from Chodo rescues ace Captain Joseph C. McConnell on 12 April 1953.

During the Korean War, the USAF designated the airfield as K-54, but it was often listed as incomplete or not built.

An element of the USAF 3rd Air Rescue Squadron operating Sikorsky H-5s and later Sikorsky H-19s was based on the island from January 1952. Cho-do was regarded as an ideal forward operating base particularly for the rescue of pilots of F-86s damaged over MiG Alley as the F-86 could usually glide to an ejection location near Chodo, often the rescue forces would have to wait for the damaged F-86 to arrive at the rescue location. On 4 April 1953, an H-19 rescued Captain Joseph C. McConnell the future top-scoring US ace in Korea after he ejected from his F-86 just north of Chodo. On 30 April 1953 an H-19 rescued future double-ace Captain Lonnie R. Moore after his F-86F crashed at sea north of Cho-do.

In mid-February 1952 the USAF installed early-warning radar on Cho-do which could detect aircraft taking off and landing at Chinese airfields along the Yalu River. In May a tactical control center was added and this was used vector F-86s against MiG-15s The base was later used for communications interception duties including providing advance warning of an air attack on Taehwa-do on 30 November leading to a USAF ambush that resulted in the destruction of 12 communist aircraft.

On 5 September 1952 communist artillery shelled the base, injuring six civilians. On 13 October the radar on Cho-do detected six aircraft heading towards the base; these aircraft, believed to be Po-2s, dropped 14 bombs, which killed four civilians. Similar attacks occurred on 26 November and 5 and 10 December causing minimal damage. Another attack took place on 15 April 1953, killing two gunners and destroying one anti-aircraft gun.

UN forces withdrew from Cho-do under the terms of the Korean Armistice Agreement that ended the Korean War on 27 July 1953.
