= 66th Rescue Squadron =

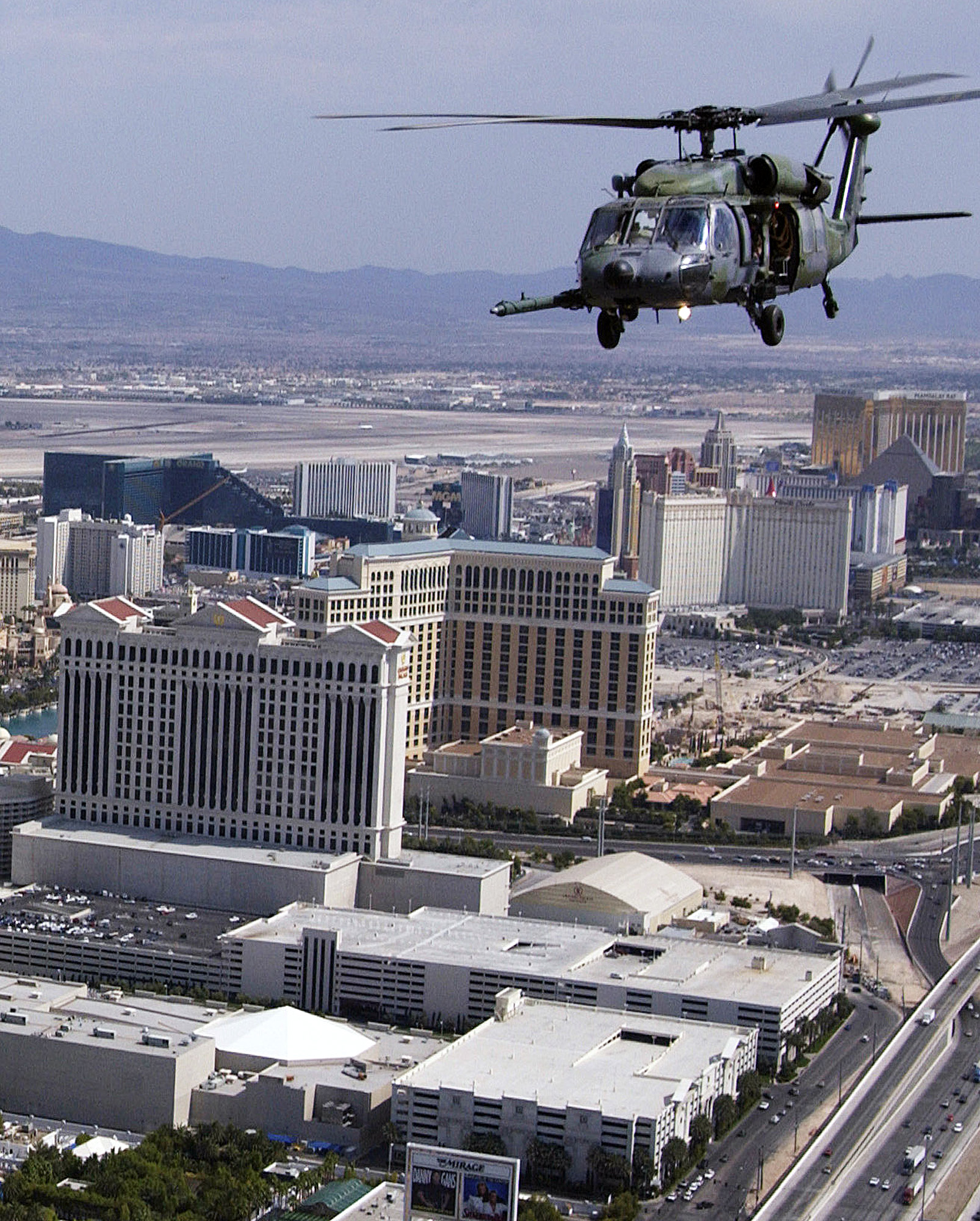
- Squadron HH-60G flying over the Las Vegas Strip in 2003
- Active: 1952–1958; 1991–2023
- Country: United States
- Branch: United States Air Force
- Role: Search and Rescue
- Part of: Air Combat Command
- Motto: Haec Ago Ut Alii Vivant (Latin for 'This I Do That Others May Live')
- Engagements: Iraq War; Global War on Terror
- Decorations: Presidential Unit Citation; Air Force Outstanding Unit Award with Combat "V" Device; Air Force Meritorious Unit Award; Air Force Outstanding Unit Award

Insignia
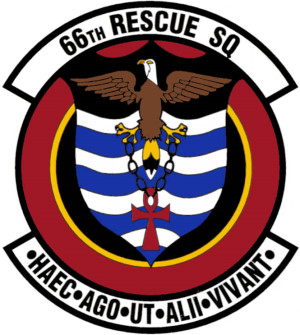
- 66th Rescue Squadron emblem (Note: Approved 21 February 1958.)

The 66th Rescue Squadron is an inactive squadron of the United States Air Force that was last stationed at Nellis Air Force Base, Nevada, where it operated HH-60 Pave Hawk helicopters conducting search and rescue and combat search and rescue missions. At the time of its inactivation in 2023, it was a geographically separated unit of the 563rd Rescue Group, 355th Wing, at Davis–Monthan Air Force Base, Arizona.

== History ==
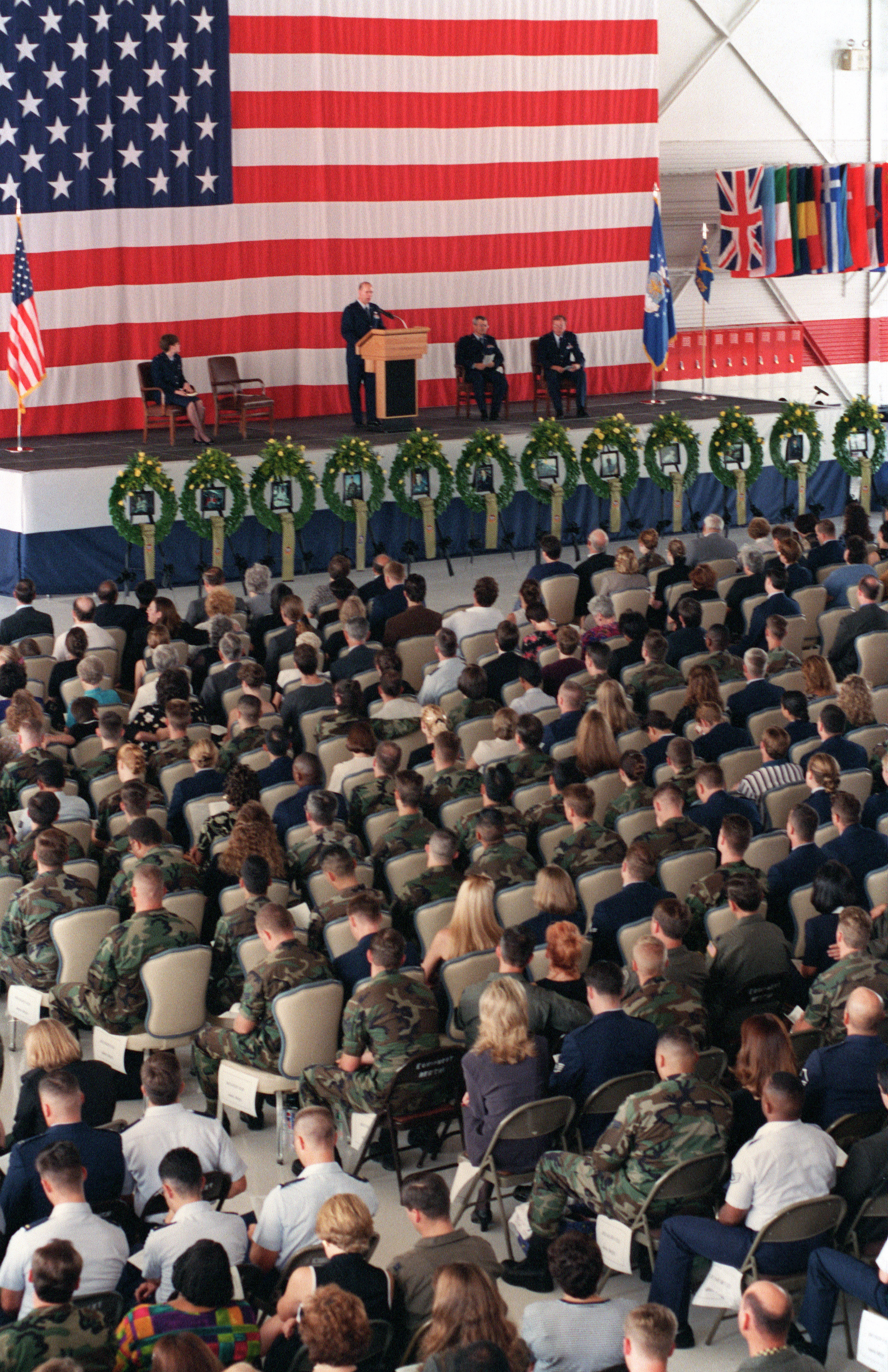
Memorial service for twelve killed from USAF 66th Rescue Squadron during mid-air collision of 3 September 1998

The 66th flew search and rescue, aeromedical evacuation, and disaster relief from 1952 to 1958 and since 1991. The squadron deployed to Southwest Asia to ensure Iraq’s compliance with United Nations treaty terms from, January–July 1993.

The squadron was plagued by aviation accidents in recent years. Twelve USAF airmen were killed when two HH-60G Pavehawk helicopters, call signs Jolly 38 and Jolly 39, were involved in a mid-air collision on 3 September 1998 over the Nevada Test and Training Range during a routine night training exercise. An investigation of the crash cited inadequate training, and constant combat deployments without adequate rest, as contributing factors.

The unit was in Afghanistan in the summer of 2010. Media reported four aircrew deaths in June when a Pave Hawk helicopter was shot down during a rescue mission on 9 June. Flight engineer David Smith was lost on impact. On 2 July a fifth death was added to the list of four when Captain David Wisniewski died from injuries received in the 9 June crash. Captain Wisniewski is credited with saving more than 240 soldiers during his seven tours of duty in Iraq and Afghanistan, 40 of which were saved in his final rescue mission in June. The only two survivors Captain Anthony Simone and Master Sergeant Christopher Aguilera are still in recovery as of 25 September 2010.

The squadron was inactivated on 1 June 2023 during a ceremony at Nellis AFB.

In April 2026, the squadron was awarded a Presidential Unit Citation for its actions between 16 July and 1 August 2021, when it was part of the Personnel Recovery Task Force that evacuated U.S. and Afghan noncombatants following the collapse of the Afghan government. Operating from Hamid Karzai International Airport, the task force saved more than 1,900 Americans and Afghans and established a safe evacuation path for more than 12,000 additional Afghan refugees. The 66th assisted locating, while tracking American citizens, Afghan refugees, and other country nationals being evacuated aboard C-17s.

=== Mission in early 2020s ===
The primary mission of the 66th Rescue Squadron was worldwide combat rescue in support of combat air forces. The 66 RQS was one of six Air Force active-duty HH-60 combat rescue units, geared for worldwide deployment.

The squadron's secondary mission was to rescue downed personnel in the Nellis Range Complex and backup rescue for civilian agencies in the local area and the greater Southwestern United States.

Depending on the mission, a typical rescue crew might have included a pilot, co-pilot, flight engineer, aerial gunner and two pararescuemen. These Pararescue Jumpers, or "PJs," are qualified as combat paramedics, scuba divers, parachutists, mountain climbers and survivalists.

The unit provided rapidly deployable combat search and rescue (CSAR) forces to Unified combatant commands and conducts peacetime search and rescue in support of the National Search and Rescue Plan and the U.S. Air Force Warfare Center.

The 66th also directly supports HH-60G logistical and maintenance support requirements for the U.S. Air Force Weapons School and Air Combat Command-directed operational test missions.

The first Sikorsky HH-60W Jolly Green II arrived during September 2022 beginning the replacement of the HH-60G.

== Lineage ==
- Constituted as the 66th Air Rescue Squadron on 17 October 1952

Activated on 14 November 1952
Inactivated on 18 January 1958
Activated on 1 January 1991
Redesignated 66th Rescue Squadron on 1 February 1993
Inactivated 1 June 2023

=== Assignments ===
- 9th Air Rescue Group, 14 November 1952 – 18 January 1958 (attached to United States Air Forces in Europe until 15 November 1953, Third Air Force until 1 August 1954, United States Air Forces in Europe until c. 18 January 1958)
- Air Rescue Service, 18 January 1991 (attached to 4404th Operations Group (Provisional) 25 January - 5 July 1993)
- 57th Operations Group, 1 February 1993
- 563rd Rescue Group, 1 October 2003

=== Stations ===
- RAF Manston, England, 14 November 1952 – 18 January 1958
- Nellis Air Force Base, Nevada, 18 January 1991 – 1 June 2023

(Deployed to Kuwait City, Kuwait 25 January – 5 July 1993)

=== Aircraft ===
- Grumman SA-16 Albatross (1952–1958)
- Sikorsky SH-19 (1952–1958)
- Fairchild C-82 Packet (1952–1953)
- Sikorsky HH-60G Pave Hawk (1991–2023)
- Sikorsky HH-60W Jolly Green II (2022–2023)
