= 563rd Rescue Group =

US Air Force unit

563rd Rescue Group

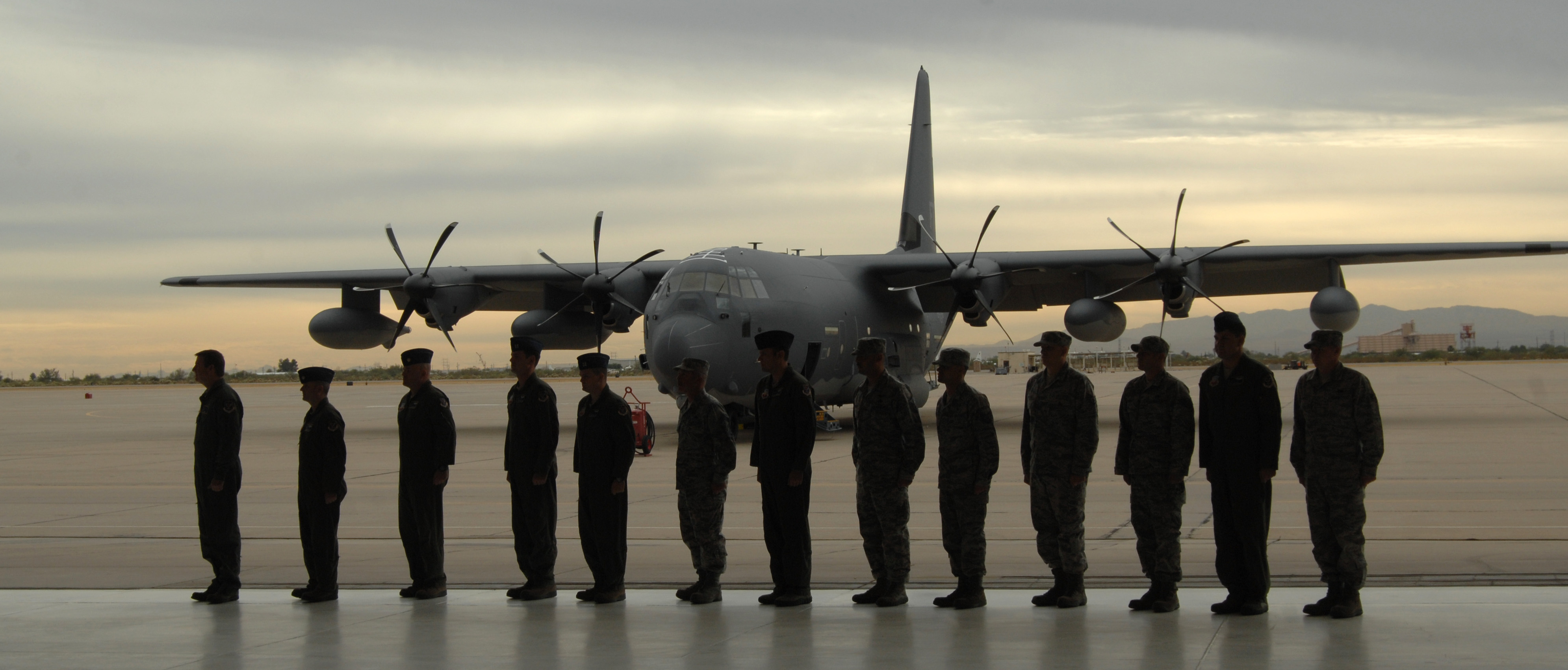
- The crew of the first HC-130J in front of their plane on Davis-Monthan AFB
- Active: 1944–1957, 1966–1976, 2003 – present
- Country: United States
- Branch: United States Air Force
- Role: Combat search and rescue
- Part of: Air Combat Command
- Garrison/HQ: Davis-Monthan Air Force Base, Arizona
- Motto: Per Adversa ad Ereptionem (Latin for 'Through Adversity to the Rescue')
- Engagements: Southwest Pacific Theater Korean War Vietnam War
- Decorations: Distinguished Unit Citation; Presidential Unit Citation; Air Force Meritorious Unit Award; Air Force Outstanding Unit Award with Combat "V" Device; Air Force Outstanding Unit Award; Philippine Republic Presidential Unit Citation; Korean Presidential Unit Citation; Vietnamese Gallantry Cross with Palm

Insignia
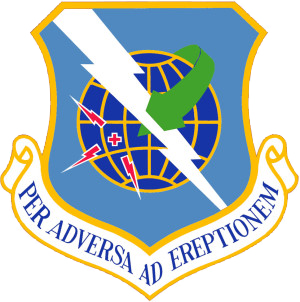
- 563rd Rescue Group emblem (Note: Approved 18 March 1968 for 3rd Aerospace Rescue & Recovery Group.)

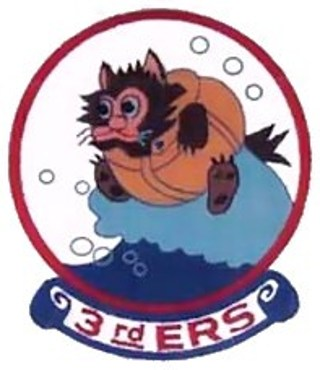
- 3rd Emergency Rescue Squadron emblem during World War II

The 563rd Rescue Group (officially 563d Rescue Group) is a United States Air Force unit stationed at Davis-Monthan Air Force Base, Arizona. The group also controls the rescue squadrons at Nellis Air Force Base, Nevada. It is assigned to the 355th Wing. The group directs flying operations dedicated to personnel recovery and is part of Air Combat Command. The group was activated under its current designation at Davis-Monthan in 2003 to command rescue units in the western United States.

The group was first activated during World War II as the 3rd Emergency Rescue Squadron at Keesler Field, Mississippi. After training on the Gulf Coast, the squadron moved to the Southwest Pacific Theater in the fall of 1944, and served in combat until the surrender of Japan, earning a Philippine Presidential Unit Citation. After the war, the squadron moved to Japan, where it became part of the occupation forces, and was located there when the Korean War began. It again served in combat, expanding to become the 3rd Air Rescue Group in 1952, and earning two Distinguished Unit Citations and two Korean Presidential Unit Citations during the war. The group was inactivated in 1957, when Air Rescue Service eliminated its groups and assigned its squadrons directly to its regional rescue centers.

The group was organized again at Tan Son Nhut Airport in 1966 as the 3rd Aerospace Rescue and Recovery Group, to command United States Air Force rescue units engaged in the War in Vietnam. It participated in every campaign after 1966, winning an additional four Presidential Unit Citations, an Air Force Outstanding Unit Award with Combat "V" Device and two Vietnamese Gallantry Cross with Palm during combat in Southeast Asia. When the United States withdrew from Vietnam, the group moved its headquarters to Thailand and, after participating in the evacuations of Phnom Penh and Saigon, was inactivated there in 1976.

== Mission ==
The 563rd Rescue Group directs flying operations dedicated to personnel recovery and is part of Air Combat Command. The group is responsible for training, readiness, and operations of one Lockheed HC-130J Combat King squadron, two Sikorsky HH-60G Pave Hawk squadrons, two "Guardian Angel" squadrons, and an operations support squadron.

== Units ==
- The 48th Rescue Squadron at Davis-Monthan, and the 58th Rescue Squadron at Nellis Air Force Base, Nevada, are "Guardian Angel" squadrons that train, equip and employ pararescuemen (commonly known as "PJs"), combat rescue officers, and supporting personnel worldwide. During combat rescue operations, they use various fixed and rotary wing aircraft for insertion and extraction. The squadrons provide survivor contact, treatment, and extraction during combat rescue operations. They provide combat and humanitarian search, rescue, and medical assistance.
- The 55th Rescue Squadron operates the Sikorsky HH-60G Pave Hawk and deploys combat rescue forces worldwide. It employs its helicopter and aircrews in hostile environments to recover downed aircrew and isolated personnel during day, night, or marginal weather conditions. The squadron also conducts civil search and rescue, disaster relief, international aid, emergency medical evacuation, and counter-drug activities.
- The 66th Rescue Squadron is a geographically separated unit of the group located at Nellis Air Force Base, Nevada and also operates the HH-60G Pave Hawk. Its mission is similar to the 55th Rescue Squadron. The squadron also meets HH-60G logistical and maintenance support requirements for the USAF Weapons School and Air Combat Command directed operational test missions.
- The 79th Rescue Squadron operates the HC-130J Combat King II and provides combat rescue forces to theater commanders worldwide. It conducts helicopter air refueling, airdrop, and landing of pararescue personnel on unimproved runways, and equipment to recover combat personnel. Its crews fly low-level operations and perform these missions day or night.
- The 563rd Operations Support Squadron supports the training and employment of the 563rd Rescue Group's six combat and support squadrons. It provides support functions, including weapons and tactics, current operations, intelligence, training, life support, and mobility. It manages programmed flying hours to insure that operational and training requirements are met within parameters set by higher headquarters. It is also responsible for implementing contingency and theater war plans.

== History ==
=== World War II and occupation of Japan ===
==== World War II ====
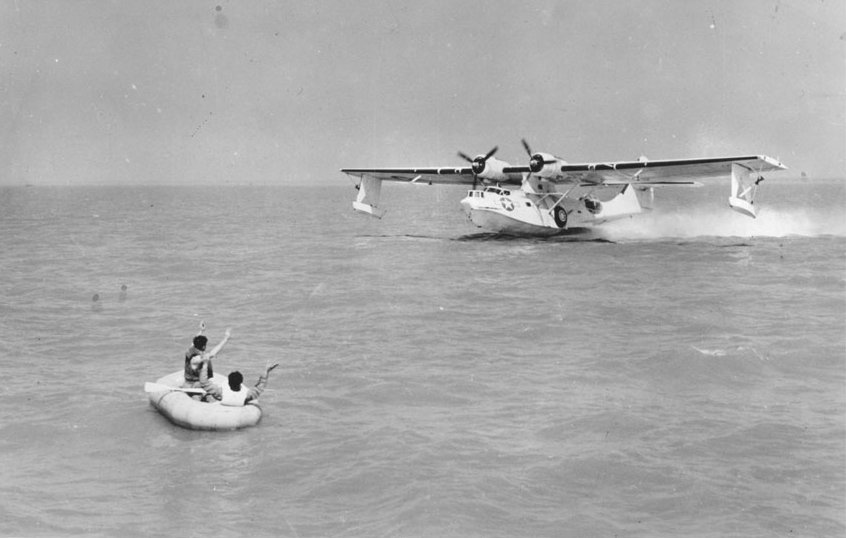
OA-10 Catalina

The unit was first activated at Gulfport Army Air Field, Mississippi in February 1944 as the 3rd Emergancy Rescue Squadron, a Consolidated OA-10 Catalina unit. As with most Army Air Forces rescue units, especially those deploying to the Pacific, the unit was organized primarily for water recovery of downed aircrews. A number of the squadron's cadre had already received training from the United States Navy with the Catalina at Naval Air Station Pensacola. The unit continued its training at Keesler Field, Mississippi in April. On 18 May the ground echelon departed for the Southwest Pacific Theater, while the air echelon continued training at Keesler. The ground echelon arrived at Oakland Army Base, California on 20 May 1944 to ship out for Australia on the SS Boschfontein, arriving at Archerfield Airport near Brisbane, Australia on 17 June. It moved to Oro Bay Airfield, New Guinea three days later, and moved forward to Mokmer Airfield on Biak in the Netherlands East Indies on 2 September 1944.

The squadron's air echelon continued training at Keesler until 5 July 1944, when it flew to the Sacramento Air Depot, California, arriving the following day. It moved to Fairfield-Suisun Army Air Field, California on 15 August, and arrived at Archerfield Airport on 1 September 1944. It was finally reunited with the ground echelon at Mokmer on 29 September 1944.

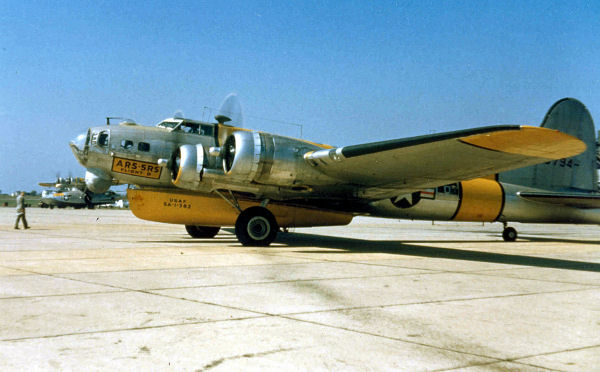
SB-17 showing the droppable life boat

The squadron's first combat mission was flown on 21 September 1944, when it picked up two downed Navy fliers. In November 1944, the squadron began operating from the Philippines. Initially the Army was unable to support its OA-10s, and for several months, they were supported by the Navy's seaplane tenders, USS Orca (AVP-49) and USS Half Moon (AVP-26). This support continued even after the arrival of the squadron's ground echelon. During the last four months of the war, the squadron began to operate Boeing SB-17 Dumbos, which were equipped with a 27-foot long life boat with survival equipment that could be dropped to downed aircrews, in addition to its Catalinas. This permitted the rescue of crews who were downed in seas that were too high for the Catalinas to land and pick them up. The Dumbos would frequently accompany strike aircraft, orbiting off the coast during the attack, so as to be in position to accompany distressed aircraft on the return flight. If needed, the life boat, whose engines gave it a range of 500 miles, could be dropped to crews that ditched or bailed out of their aircraft. The squadron also provided courier service, carried supplies and messages, evacuated allied prisoners and wounded personnel, and occasionally provided reconnaissance.

The squadron's flights frequently operated at bases separated from the squadron headquarters. For example, in the last month of the war, August 1945, squadron flights or detachments were located at Mindoro, Floridablanca Airfield and Laoag on Luzon, and on Ie Shima near Okinawa. During its eleven months of operating in the Pacific, it was credited with rescuing 325 persons.

==== Occupation of Japan ====
The squadron was one of the first American military units to move to Japan after VJ Day. Elements of the unit were at Atsugi Airfield in September 1945, and the squadron headquarters joined them in October. Although the squadron became part of the occupation forces, its personnel did not, and by early 1946, only one qualified Catalina pilot was assigned to the unit. It was not until the summer of 1946 that regular Army Air Forces officers and soldiers were assigned in sufficient strength for the squadron to resume operations. Squadron flights were located at Atsugi, Chitose Air Base, Itazuke Air Base and Itami Air Base in Japan and at Kimpo Air Base in Korea.

From 1946 through 1950, the squadron, called the 3rd Rescue Squadron after 1948, provided rescue capabilities in Japan. Its primary mission was to intercept distressed aircraft and escort them over the Japanese Home Islands and the adjacent waters. Experience in the China Burma India Theater had demonstrated the need for land rescue capabilities using helicopters and light planes. In response, the squadron added Sikorsky R-6 helicopters and Stinson L-5 Sentinels to its inventory in 1947. In 1949, Air Rescue Service, which had been formed and assigned to Air Transport Command in 1946 to control rescue units in the United States and along that command's overseas routes, took over command of rescue units in the Pacific, although they remained attached to Far East Air Forces units for operational control.

=== Korean War ===
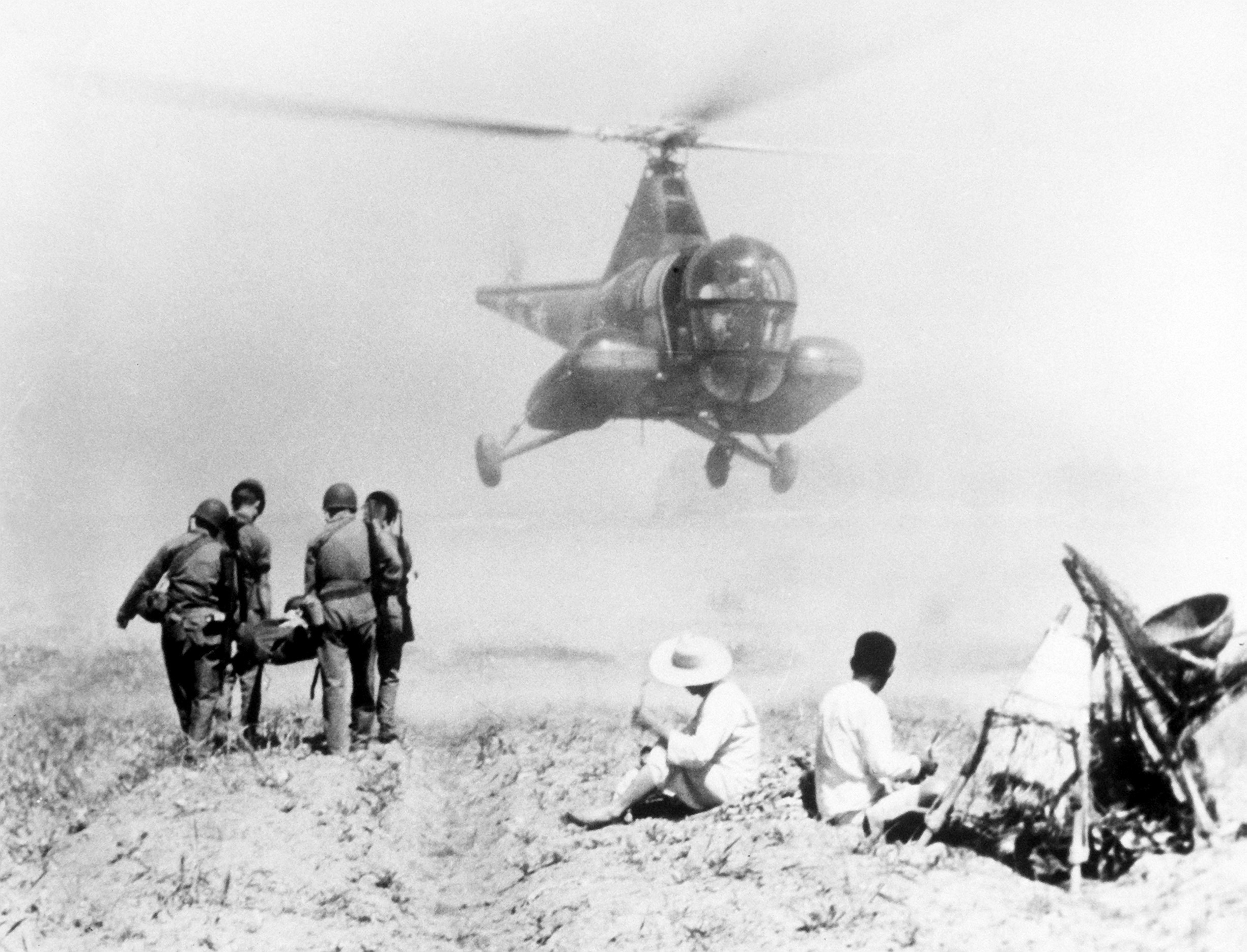
Squadron H-5 preparing to evacuate soldier to a MASH

==== Deployment of elements to Korea ====
Following the North Korean invasion of South Korea on 25 June 1950, the squadron deployed two L-5 Sentinels and one Douglas SC-47 Skytrain to Pusan West Air Base to perform search and rescue missions. These were replaced a week later by Sikorsky H-5 helicopters. By late August, a squadron representative was stationed with the Joint Operations Center to coordinate rescue operations. Three months later, this single officer expanded into a Rescue Control Center, under the command of the squadron's deputy commander, and was also known as "3rd Air Rescue Squadron in Korea."

==== Operations in Korea ====
Combat operations in Korea, and the changing tactical situation there, soon added the missions of rescuing aircrew downed behind enemy lines, and evacuating wounded personnel with the squadron's helicopters. The squadron's first rescue of a downed pilot behind enemy lines occurred on 4 September, when a North American F-51 Mustang pilot of the 35th Fighter-Bomber Squadron was rescued by a squadron helicopter. Initially, because of the aircraft available to the unit, now called the 3rd Air Rescue Squadron, efforts were limited to short range missions. The squadron's H-5 helicopters could operate from Korea's many rice paddies, sometimes escorted by the unit's L-5 Sentinels, which also flew aeromedical evacuation missions from small unprepared fields. Because of the limited resources of the squadron, it was augmented by crews and aircraft of the 2nd Air Rescue Squadron at Clark Air Base in the Philippines. The augmentation by the 2nd was particularly in the form of Boeing SB-29 Superdumbos, which operated offshore from strike areas, much as the SB-17 Dumbos had during World War II.

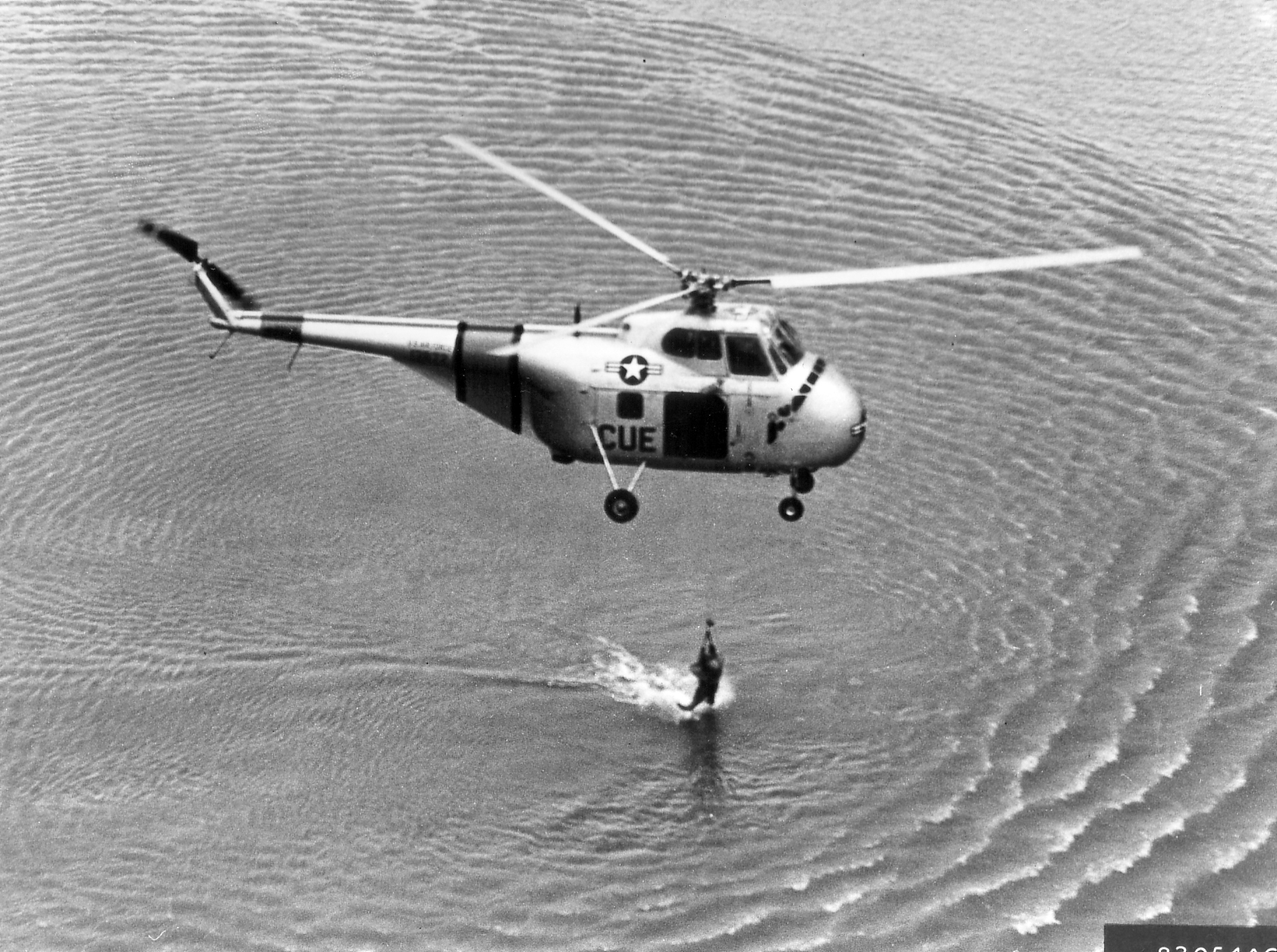
Group H-19 water rescue (Note: The helicopter is hoisting USAF Capt. Joseph C. McConnell out of the Yellow Sea off Korea on 12 April 1953. McConnell was shot down by a Mikoyan-Gurevich MiG-15 in his North American F-86E Sabre serial 51-2753. Although the helicopter is marked as an Air Rescue Service aircraft, it was actually being operated by the 581st Air Resupply and Communications Wing, which operated a helicopter detachment alongside the 3rd's detachment on Cho do. Marion, p. 19.)

The squadron's Boeing SB-17 Dumbos and SC-47 Skytrains were used in the search role, with the C-47 "Gooneybirds" being commandeered on occasion to fly critical supply missions. Early in the war, both these planes began to be replaced by SB-29 Superdumbos. When the war began, Air Rescue Service's newest plane, the Grumman SA-16 Albatross amphibian, was not on the strength of any unit in the Pacific. To remedy this, a detachment of four Albatrosses from the 5th Rescue Squadron at Lowry Air Force Base, Colorado was dispatched in July 1950 to augment the 3rd Squadron. By November, the squadron began to receive its own SA-16s, and it was fully equipped by the following March. In March 1951, the squadron received a YH-19 test model of the Sikorsky helicopter to evaluate in combat. Replacement of the H-5s by the Sikorsky H-19 greatly extended the range of the squadron's rotary wing elements.

The squadron's helicopters frequently flew wounded soldiers to Army Mobile Army Surgical Hospital (MASH) units, typically stationing one H-5 and one L-5 with each MASH. (Note: Eventually, the Army began using its own Bell H-13 Sioux in this mission as well. By the war's end, approximately 25,000 wounded had been evacuated to MASH units, with almost 8,400 of them by helicopters of the 3rd. Marion, p. 17.) In December 1951, the squadron successfully evacuated troops to a Navy hospital ship sailing off the Korean coast. Dr. Elmer Henderson, a former chairman of the American Medical Association, credited the drop in the mortality rate for wounded soldiers to half that experienced during World War II to their quick evacuation by rescue helicopters. Over 7,000 casualties were evacuated by the 3rd during the war. Squadron elements operated out of Paengnyong-do and Cho-do islands off the coast of North Korea, enabling its limited range helicopters to rescue aircrew far behind enemy lines.

Associated in part with these forward locations, the squadron assumed a secondary mission of special operations. Shortly after the arrival of the YH-19, it was used to extract "United Nations personnel" (most likely Korean guerillas) from behind enemy lines. During November 1950, squadron SB-17s dropped a number of agents near the Chinese border, along with radio equipment, to provide intelligence data on enemy components. In April 1951, the unit recovered components of a MiG-15 that had crashed near Sinanju for study by military intelligence.

==== Squadron to group ====
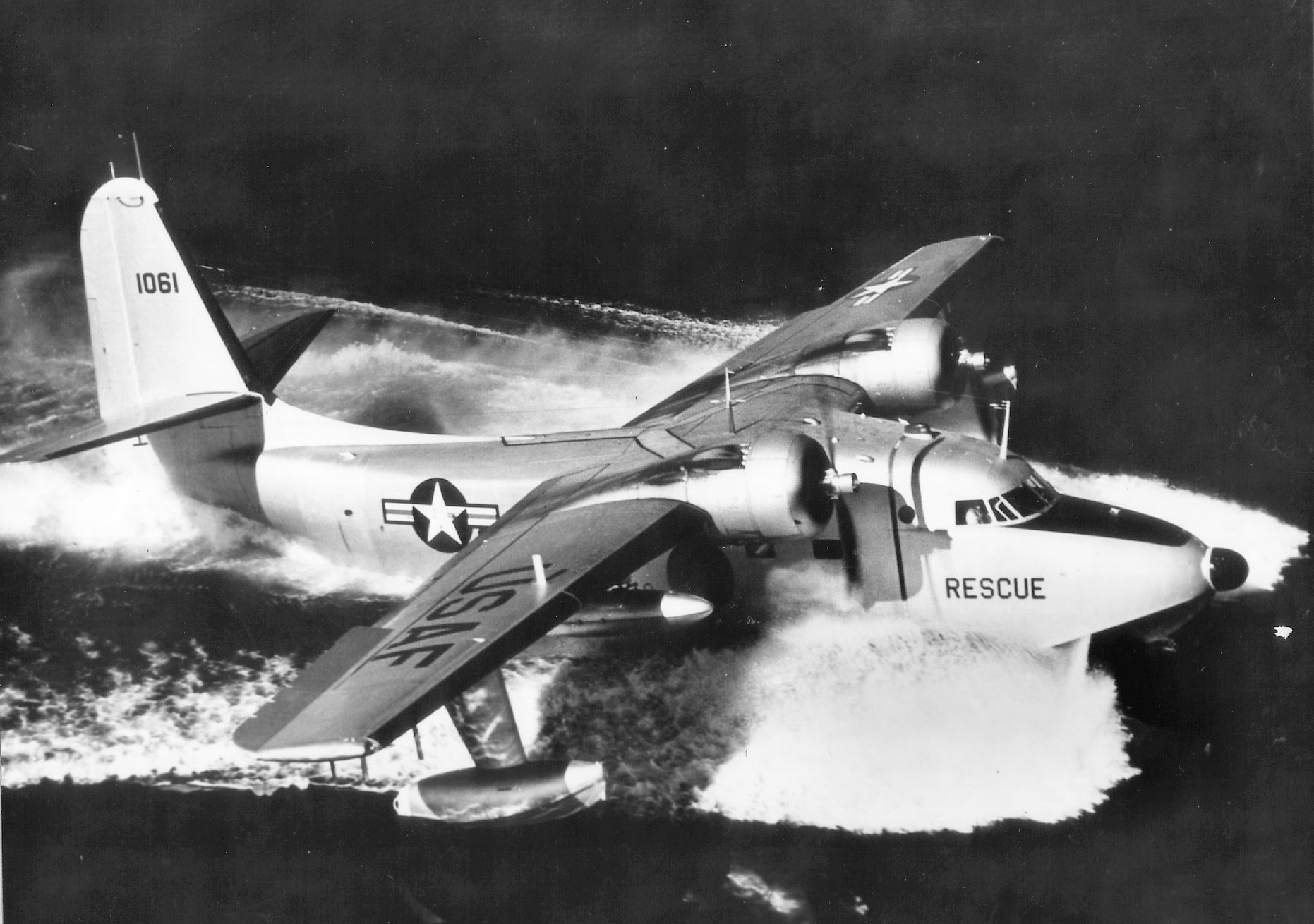
38th Squadron Albatross taking off (Note: Aircraft is Grumman SA-16A Albatross serial 51-006.)

While still flying combat missions, in November 1952, the squadron was expanded, becoming the 3rd Air Rescue Group. Each of the squadron's flights was replaced by a newly-activated squadron, assigned to the new group:

A Flight at Johnson Air Base, Japan was replaced by the 36th Air Rescue Squadron
B Flight at Komaki Air Base, Japan was replaced by the 37th Air Rescue Squadron
C Flight at Misawa Air Base, Japan was replaced by the 38th Air Rescue Squadron
D Flight at Ashiya Air Base, Japan was replaced by the 39th Air Rescue Squadron

At the same time, Detachment 1 of the squadron at Seoul, Korea was expanded into the 2157th Air Rescue Squadron

The group was credited with rescuing almost 10,000 United Nations personnel during the Korean War, including almost 1,000 combat saves from behind enemy lines, and 200 water rescues. Its actions earned the unit a Distinguished Unit Citation and two Korean Presidential Unit Citations. (Note: The squadron was the first United States Air Force unit to earn a Distinguished Unit Citation. Tilford, p. 14.)

Following the war, the group returned to providing rescue capability in Japan. As Air Rescue Service shrank from a peak of 50 squadrons in 1954, the 37th Squadron was inactivated in May 1955. During 1955, the group replaced its SB-29s with Douglas SC-54 Skymasters. The SC-54 carried four 40-man inflatable rafts that were safer to drop than the single wooden boat carried by the SB-29. In 1957, group headquarters and the 38th Squadron were inactivated, and the 36th and 39th Squadrons were transferred to the 2nd Air Rescue Group. By 1961 Air Rescue Service would have only eleven squadrons assigned.

=== Vietnam War ===
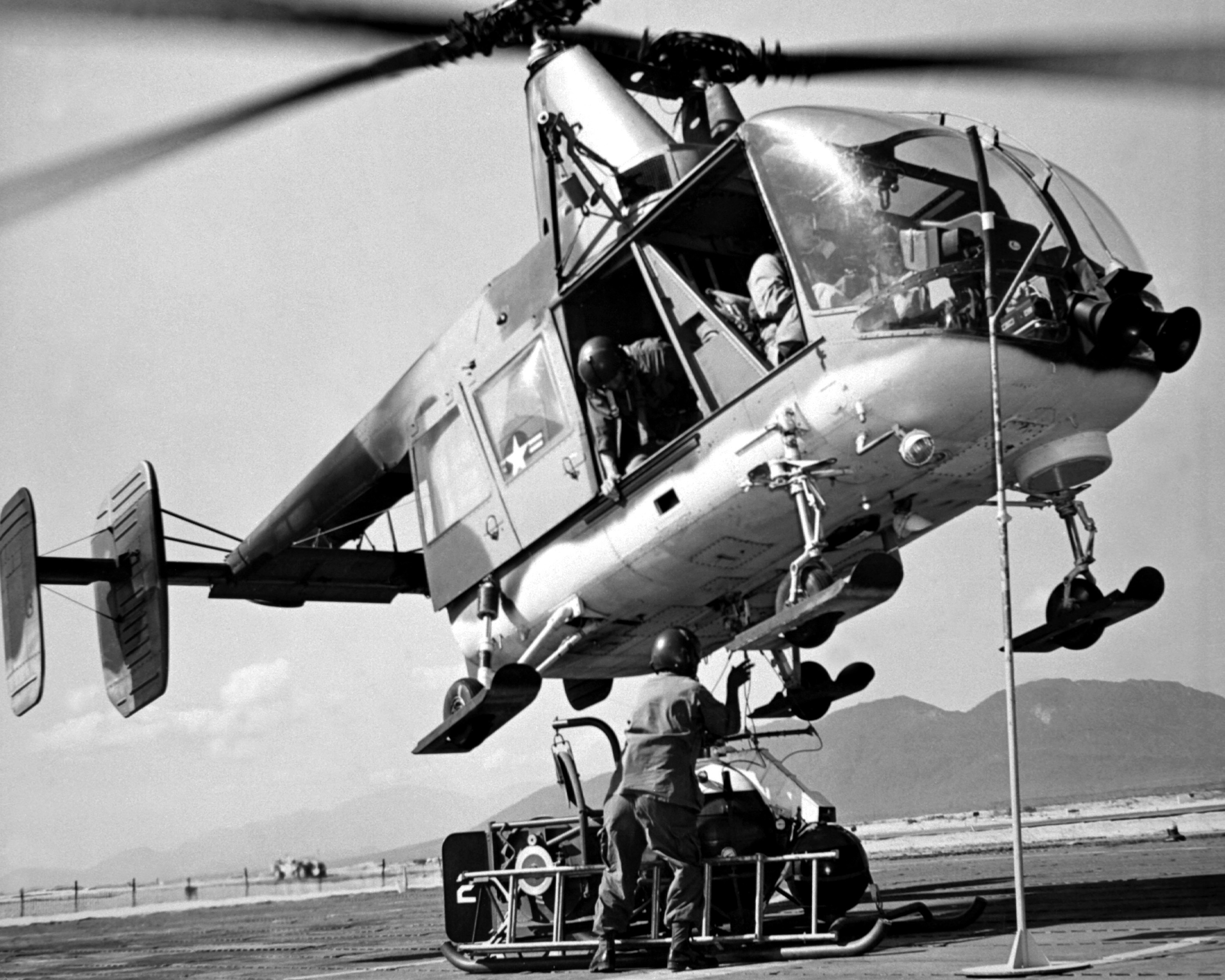
HH-43 Huskie picking up fire suppression kit at Cam Ranh Bay

==== Buildup of rescue forces ====
Coordination of USAF rescue operations in Southeast Asia had begun with the establishment of Detachment 3, Pacific Air Rescue Center, which was replaced in July 1965 by the 38th Air Rescue Squadron, (Note: After 8 January 1966, this squadron was the 38th Aerospace Rescue and Recovery Squadron.) with rescue detachments at several bases in South Vietnam and Thailand. The squadron also manned the Joint Search and Rescue Center at Tan Son Nhut Airport, which operated through regional rescue coordination centers at Da Nang Air Base, South Vietnam and Udorn Royal Thai Air Force Base. The Joint Center also directed Seventh Fleet rescue operations in the Gulf of Tonkin.

Rising aircraft losses in late 1965 led to the expansion of Air Force rescue assets in Southeast Asia. The group was reactivated as the 3rd Aerospace Rescue and Recovery Group, with Detachment 1 at Da Nang, and Detachment 2 at Udorn, manning the regional rescue centers. The 38th Squadron became responsible for local base rescue detachments at bases in Vietnam and Thailand, using Kaman HH-43 Huskies. (Note: These helicopters were more commonly referred to as "Pedros", after their radio call sign.) The 37th Aerospace Rescue and Recovery Squadron was established at Da Nang, and was responsible for rescue missions in North Vietnam, Laos and for Air Force rescue efforts in the Gulf of Tonkin. It used Sikorsky HH-3 Jolly Green Giants for combat rescue, and Lockheed HC-130s as command and control aircraft to coordinate rescue operations. It was also assigned HU-16s (Note: When the Department of Defense adopted a single aircraft designation system, the SA-16 became the HU-16.) for long range water rescue over the Gulf of Tonkin. Later, the HC-130s at Da Nang and Udorn were combined to form the group's third squadron, the 39th Aerospace Rescue and Recovery Squadron.

==== Improved equipment ====
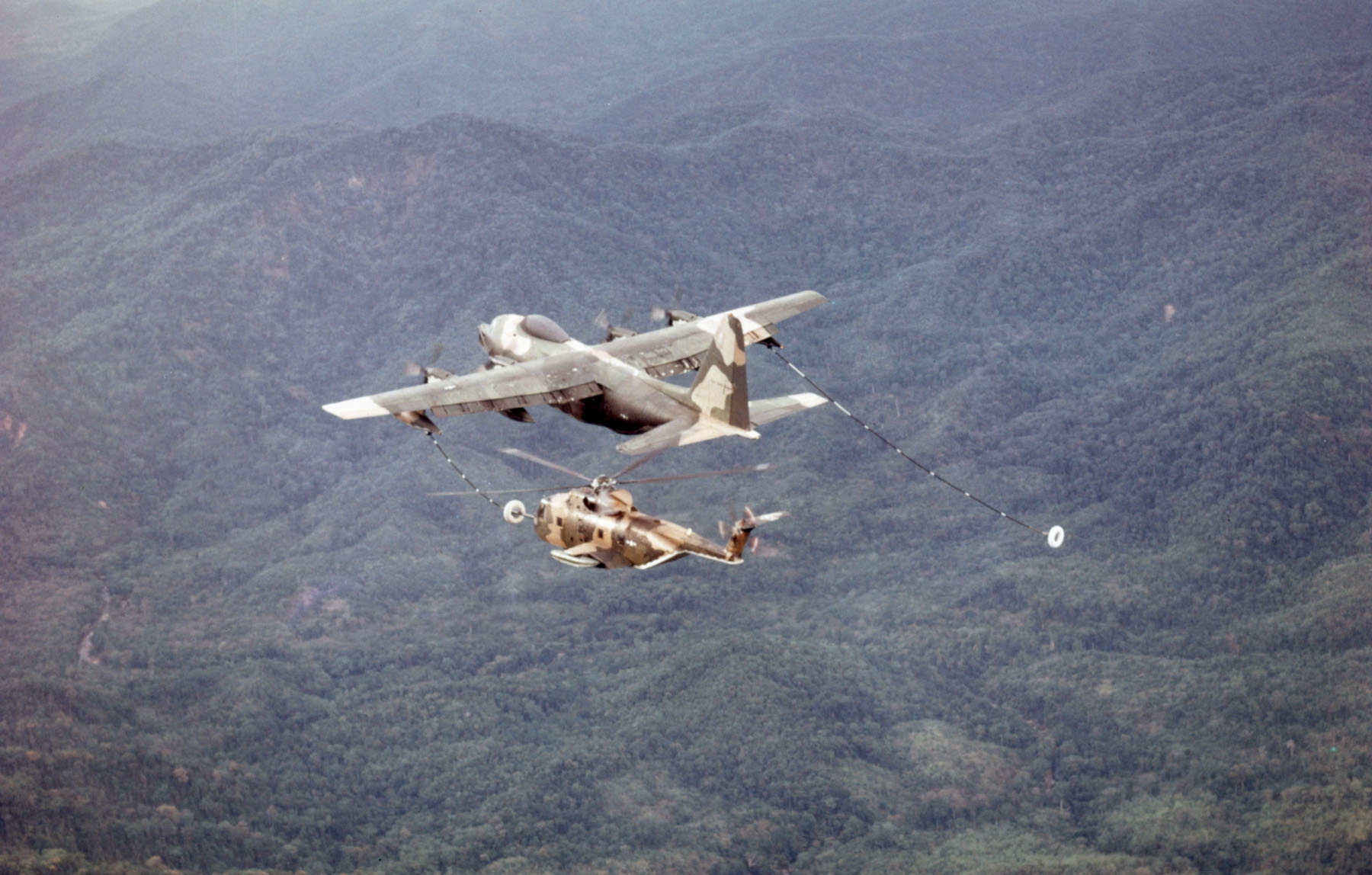
HC-130 refuels HH-3 over Southeast Asia

The capabilities of the "off the shelf" rescue helicopters assigned to it limited the group's effectiveness. The HH-43 could not hover at higher altitudes, and the HH-3 needed to stage from forward bases in Laos to provide rescue coverage for North Vietnam. This deficiency was partially remedied by the addition of air refueling capability to the HH-3s. Within a few months after the first combat refueling in June 1967, in flight refueling became standard, but staging bases in Laos continued to be used. In addition to extending the range of the group's refuelable helicopters, air refueling permitted them to dump fuel when needed to lighten the aircraft, and to enable it to hover for rescues at high altitudes, knowing that it would be able to connect with a tanker after the rescue attempt and on-load sufficient fuel to return to its home base.

In parallel with the introduction of the HC-130H air refueling aircraft, in the spring of 1967, the group implemented Operation High Drink, which enabled the HH-3s to take on fuel from virtually any Navy ship operating in the Gulf of Tonkin, either landing on larger ships, or hovering alongside smaller ones. Combined with the Jolly Green Giant's ability to land on water, this permitted the withdrawal of the HU-16 amphibians, which flew their last combat rescue sortie on 30 September 1967.

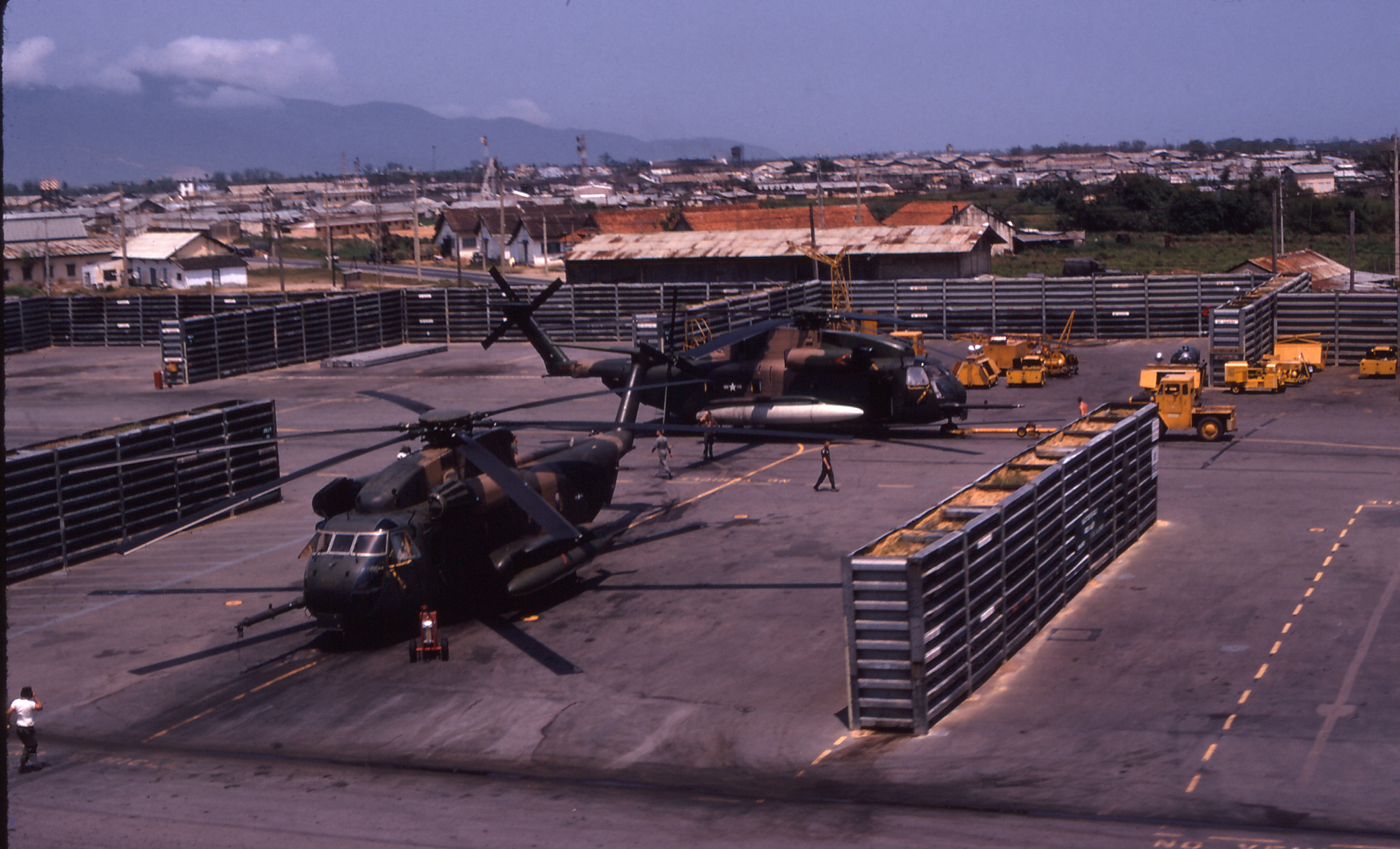
37th Squadron HH-53s in revetments at Da Nang Air Base

In the fall of 1967, the group received its first Sikorsky HH-53 Super Jolly Green Giant, which were stationed at Udorn Royal Thai Air Force Base. These helicopters improved capabilities over Laos and North Vietnam, since they were faster, could hover at altitudes up to 6,500 ft pressure altitude and were armed with three GAU-28/A 7.62mm miniguns. Because of their larger size, HH-53s also carried a second pararescue specialist. However, despite the improved capability provided by the BUFF (as it was called by crewmembers), the unit's night rescue capability remained very limited and night rescue attempts were rarely successful. In March 1968, expanded rescue missions over Laos and North Vietnam led to the formation of a second squadron at Udorn, the 40th Aerospace Rescue and Recovery Squadron.

==== Reductions in rescue operations ====
Reductions in the size of the group began in December 1969, when the local base rescue detachment at Binh Thuy Air Base was discontinued. Closure of these detachments continued through 1970 as bases were closed or transferred to the Army or the Vietnamese Air Force. The closure of Tuy Hoa Air Base required the group's 39th Squadron to move to Cam Ranh Bay Air Base in the fall of 1970. By July 1971 reductions in local base rescue reached the point where the 38th Squadron was inactivated and the few remaining detachments were transferred directly to the group. That same month, the 40th Squadron moved to Nakhon Phanom Royal Thai Air Force Base, to better support the campaign against the Ho Chi Minh Trail in Laos, where air strikes had been concentrated since the bombing halt above the 20th parallel.

Although the group did not directly participate in the Son Tay Raid in November 1970, when the Joint Contingency Task Force arrived in theater, it used seven HH-53s from the group's 40th Squadron, and two HH-3s from the 37th Squadron.

In March 1972, the HC-130Ps of the 39th Squadron left Vietnam for Korat Royal Thai Air Force Base. Shortly after its arrival there, the squadron was inactivated, and its planes were temporarily absorbed by the Korat local base rescue detachment. However, in July, the 56th Aerospace Rescue and Recovery Squadron was activated to manage these aircraft. By late in the year, withdrawals in connection with the cease fire had resulted in the withdrawal of almost all rescue forces from Vietnam. The 37th Squadron at Da Nang Air Base was inactivated in November, and its remaining assets were absorbed by the 40th Squadron. The group moved with Seventh Air Force to Nakhon Phanom, and the existing Joint Rescue Centers were replaced by a single one located with group headquarters. Rescue operations continued in Laos and Cambodia, but the group also began to participate in training exercises.

==== 1975: Eagle Pull, Frequent Wind and the Mayaguez incident ====
On 3 April 1975, group forces were placed on alert for the possible implementation of Operation Eagle Pull, the evacuation of Americans from Phnom Penh, as Khmer Rouge forces surrounded Cambodia's capital. A group helicopter flew a United States Marine Corps command element into Phnom Penh to assume control of the evacuation. On 12 April, the group's helicopters positioned for evacuation, and flew a combat control team to the beleaguered city. After Marine helicopters had evacuated civilians, two group helicopters returned to the landing zone to extract the combat control team and remaining security forces. One HH-53 was hit by ground fire and badly damaged, but was able to return to base for an emergency landing.

As conditions in Southeast Asia continued to deteriorate, Operation Frequent Wind, the evacuation of Saigon, was implemented at the end of the month. The group placed rescue helicopters on alert at bases in Thailand and aboard USS Midway (CV-41). On 29 April, the two helicopters aboard Midway accompanied Marine CH-53s on three missions to evacuate people at the Defense Attaché Compound. The last flight carried as many as 97 refugees aboard one of the aircraft. By the end of the last mission, both Super Jollys were out of commission, having flown the group's last mission in Vietnam.

On 12 May, Khmer Rouge forces seized the SS Mayaguez, a U.S. merchant ship. The group initially flew two of its HH-53s to transport Security Policemen from Nakhon Phanom for use as a possible rescue force. On 15 May, group HH-53s again joined CH-53s of other units in transporting a Marine assault force from U-Tapao Royal Thai Navy Airfield to the island where the Mayaguez had been run aground. After offloading their Marines on the USS Harold E. Holt, the Jolly Greens headed for one of the CH-53s, Knife 21, which had been shot down after offloading its Marines. Although the crew was rescued, one of the pararescuemen on the Jolly was lost in the effort. The Jollys then escorted another CH-53, which had been struck while attempting to land its Marines. As the attempt to extract the Marines from Koh Tang Island began, additional HH-53s transported a relief force of Marines for additional security. Evacuation efforts continued under heavy enemy fire throughout the afternoon and evening in the Air Force's last combat operation in Southeast Asia.

In October 1975, the 56th Squadron was inactivated, and its remaining HC-130s absorbed by the 40th Squadron. As the United States continued its withdrawal from Southeast Asia, the Rescue Coordination Center was shut down on 15 December 1975, and the group and the 40th Squadron were inactivated at the end of January 1976. The group was credited with 3,681 saves during the war, including 2,632 combat saves.

=== Reactivation ===
Since reactivating in 2003 as the 563rd Rescue Group at Davis-Monthan Air Force Base, the group has deployed airmen and aircraft almost annually in support of Operation Enduring Freedom, Operation Iraqi Freedom, and Combined Joint Task Force – Horn of Africa. It has conducted humanitarian operations during Hurricane Katrina (which included evacuation support along the Gulf Coast), Hurricane Rita, and other hurricanes, and has supported NASA during launch and recovery of the space shuttle. 48th Rescue Squadron recovery teams have saved hundreds of lives in combat and noncombat situations. Previously assigned as a geographically separated unit of the 347th Rescue Wing and later of the 23rd Wing, both at Moody Air Force Base, Georgia, the 563rd was later reassigned to the 355th Fighter Wing, later the 355th Wing, collocated at Davis-Monthan.

=== Medal of Honor, Distinguished Service Cross and Air Force Cross ===
Three members of the group received the second highest award for heroism awarded by the United States military. After a later review, one of these awards was upgraded to the nation's highest award, the Medal of Honor.

During June 1951, Lt John J. Najarian landed his SA-16 amphibian in the Taedong River, which was not only shallow, but filled with floating debris, while low-hanging high-tension power lines ran over the river, to rescue a Mustang pilot, who had bailed out of his plane at twilight. Assisted by covering flights of Mustangs to suppress enemy flak, Lt Najarian was able to make the difficult night landing, pick up the pilot and take off successfully. For this mission, he was awarded the Distinguished Service Cross.

Airman First Class William H. Pitsenbarger of the group's 38th Squadron was the first enlisted man to be awarded the Air Force Cross. Flying as a parajumper, or PJ, on an HH-43 sent to extract an Army unit caught in a Viet Cong ambush on 7 March 1966, he descended to assist with hoisting soldiers up to the helicopter. When the Pedro (radio call sign for the tasked helicopter) had been loaded with all the wounded soldiers it could hold, Airman Pitsenbarger elected to remain behind to render aid to the remaining soldiers, all of whom were wounded. When a second HH-43 arrived on the scene, its PJ descended and found that the Viet Cong had killed Airman Pitsenbarger and the remaining soldiers. On 8 December 2000, following a review, Airman Pitsenbarger's Air Force Cross was upgraded to an award of the Medal of Honor, and he was posthumously promoted to the rank of Staff Sergeant.

Airman First Class Duane D. Hackney, a PJ with the 37th Squadron, was awarded the Air Force Cross for actions on 13 March 1967 in a rescue operation for two Marine helicopters, a Sikorsky CH-37 Mojave that had been shot down, and a Boeing Vertol CH-46 Sea Knight that had crashed while attempting to aid the first Marine chopper, when it reported that enemy forces were closing in on the crash site. Airman Hackney made multiple trips to the ground while exposed to enemy fire, loading as many Marines on his HH-3's Stokes litter as possible each trip. The HH-3 was struck by enemy fire, losing hydraulic pressure, and forcing the pilot to head for an emergency landing field. Airman Hackney continued to tend to the wounded on board, even after being rendered temporarily unconscious from a bullet that had struck his helmet. (Note: Airman Hackney's Air Force Cross was the first not awarded posthumously. He has been called the most decorated airman in Air Force history, with a Silver Star, four Distinguished Flying Crosses, 18 Air Medals, two Purple Hearts and the Cheney Award among his awards. "This Week in PACAF and USAF History 7–13 September 2009" (PDF). Pacific Air Forces Office of History. p. 2. Archived from the original on 8 April 2014..)

== Lineage ==
The lineage of the 563rd Rescue Group from organization to today:

- Constituted as the 3rd Emergency Rescue Squadron on 14 February 1944

Activated on 15 February 1944
Redesignated 3rd Rescue Squadron on 28 January 1948
Redesignated 3rd Air Rescue Squadron on 10 August 1950
Redesignated 3rd Air Rescue Group on 14 November 1952
Inactivated on 18 June 1957

- Redesignated 3rd Aerospace Rescue and Recovery Group and activated on 14 December 1965 (not organized)

Organized on 8 January 1966
Inactivated on 31 January 1976

- Redesignated 563rd Rescue Group on 29 July 2003

Activated on 1 October 2003

=== Assignments ===
Assignments of the 563rd Rescue Group from organization to today:

- Army Air Forces Training Command, 15 February 1944
- Eastern Technical Training Command, 4 March 1944
- Thirteenth Air Force, 28 July 1944
- Fifth Air Force, 17 August 1944 (under operational control of V Bomber Command, 26 August – 2 October 1944)
- 5276th Rescue Composite Group (Provisional), 2 October 1944
- 5th Emergency Rescue Group, 16 March 1945
- V Bomber Command, 21 November 1945
- 314th Composite Wing, 31 May 1946
- Fifth Air Force, 6 June 1946
- Air Rescue Service, 1 May 1949 – 18 June 1957 (attached to Fifth Air Force, 1 May 1949, 314th Air Division, 18 May 1951, Japanese Air Defense Force, 14 November 1952, Far East Air Forces, 1 August 1954 – 18 June 1957)
- Military Air Transport Service, 14 December 1965 (not organized) (Note: Active, but unorganized, Military Air Transport Service and Military Airlift Command units were assigned to command headquarters between 27 December 1965 and 8 January 1966. See Kane, Robert B. (29 April 2010). "Factsheet 60 Air Mobility Wing (AMC)". Air Force Historical Research Agency..)
- Military Airlift Command, 1 January 1966 (not organized)
- Pacific Aerospace Rescue and Recovery Center (later 41st Aerospace Rescue and Recovery Wing, 41st Rescue and Weather Reconnaissance Wing), 8 January 1966 – 31 January 1976
- 347th Rescue Wing, 1 October 2003
- 23rd Wing, 1 October 2006
- 355th Fighter Wing (later 355th Wing), 1 October 2018 – present

=== Components ===
Operational Squadrons

Operational squadrons of the 563rd Rescue Group from 1952 to today:

- 33rd Air Rescue Squadron: 20 September 1955 – 18 June 1957
- 36th Air Rescue Squadron: 14 November 1952 – 18 June 1957
- 37th Air Rescue Squadron (later 37th Aerospace Rescue and Recovery Squadron): 14 November 1952 – 8 May 1955; 8 January 1966 – 20 August 1972
- 38th Air Rescue Squadron (later, 38th Aerospace Rescue and Recovery Squadron): 14 November 1952 – 18 June 1957; 8 January 1966 – 1 July 1972
- 39th Air Rescue Squadron (later, 39th Aerospace Rescue and Recovery Squadron): 14 November 1952 – 18 June 1957; 18 January 1967 – 30 April 1972
- 40th Aerospace Rescue and Recovery Squadron: 18 March 1968 – 20 August 1972
- 48th Rescue Squadron: 1 October 2003 – present
- 55th Rescue Squadron: 1 October 2003 – present
- 56th Aerospace Rescue and Recovery Squadron: 8 July – 20 August 1972
- 58th Rescue Squadron: 1 October 2003 – present
- 60th Air Rescue Squadron: 8 April 1956 – 18 June 1957
- 66th Rescue Squadron: 1 October 2003 – 1 June 2023
- 79th Rescue Squadron: 1 October 2003 – present
- 2157th Air Rescue Squadron: 1 March 1953 – 8 April 1956

Maintenance Squadrons

- 563rd Maintenance Squadron: 1 October 2003 – c. 2005
- 763rd Maintenance Squadron: 1 October 2003 – c. 2005

Detachments

- Detachment F, 14 September 1950 – 22 June 1951
- Detachment 1, 22 June 1951 – 1 March 1953
- Detachment 1, 8 January 1966 – 15 December 1966
- Detachment 2, 8 January 1966 – 15 December 1966 (Note: In addition to these detachments, during the Vietnam War, various local base rescue detachments were assigned directly to the group after July 1971. Bailey. However, for most of the period, they operated as detachments of the group's squadrons. See generally Tilford.)

=== Stations ===
Stations of the 563rd Rescue Group from organization to today:

- Gulfport Army Air Field, Mississippi, 15 February 1944
- Keesler Field, Mississippi, 1 April 1944 – May/July 1944
- Mokmer Airfield, Biak, Netherlands East Indies, September 1944
- Dulag Airfield, Leyte, Philippines, 3 November 1944
- Tacloban Airfield, Leyte, Philippines, 1 April 1945
- Floridablanca Airfield, Luzon, Philippines, 21 May 1945
- Ie Shima Airfield, Okinawa, 15 September 1945
- Atsugi Airfield, Japan, 6 October 1945
- Nagoya Airfield, Japan, 17 June 1946
- Yokota Air Base, Japan, 15 July 1947
- Johnson Air Base, Japan, 1 April 1950
- Nagoya Air Base (later Nagoya Air Station; Moriyama Air Station), Japan, 9 December 1953 – 18 June 1957
- Tan Son Nhut Airport, South Vietnam, 8 January 1966
- Nakhon Phanom Royal Thai Air Force Base, Thailand, 15 February 1973
- U-Tapao Royal Thai Naval Airfield, Thailand, 15 September 1975 – 31 January 1976
- Davis Monthan Air Force Base, Arizona, 1 October 2003 – present

=== Aircraft ===
Aircraft of the 563rd Rescue Group from organization to today:

- Consolidated OA-10 Catalina, 1944–1947
- Boeing B-17 Flying Fortress, 1945–1957
- Boeing SB-17 Dumbo, 1945–1957
- Douglas C-47 Skytrain, 1945–1957
- Douglas SC-47 Skytrain, 1945–1957
- Stinson L-5 Sentinel, 1947–1957
- Sikorsky R-6 (later H-6), 1947–1949
- Sikorsky H-5, 1948–1954
- Boeing SB-29 Superdumbo 1949–1955
- Grumman SA-16 (later HU-16) Albatross, 1950–1957, 1966–1967
- Sikorsky H-19, 1951–1957
- Sikorsky SH-19, 1951–1957
- Douglas SC-54 Skymaster, 1956–1957
- Kaman HH-43 Huskie, 1966–1975
- Sikorsky HH-3 Jolly Green Giant, 1966–1970
- Sikorsky HH-53 Super Jolly Green Giant, 1967–1975
- Bell UH-1N Twin Huey, 1975
- Lockheed HC-130 Hercules, 1966–present (Note: included HC-130H, HC-130P and HC-130J.)
- Sikorsky HH-60G Pavehawk, 2003–present

=== Awards and campaigns ===
Award streamer	Award	Dates	Notes
	Distinguished Unit Citation	25 June 1950 – 25 December 1950	Korea 3rd Rescue Squadron (later 3rd Air Rescue Squadron)
	Distinguished Unit Citation	22 April 1951 – 8 June 1951	Korea 3rd Air Rescue Squadron
	Distinguished Unit Citation	1 May 1953 – 27 July 1953	Korea 3rd Air Rescue Squadron
	Presidential Unit Citation	1 August 1965 – 30 June 1966	3rd Aerospace Rescue and Recovery Group
	Presidential Unit Citation	1 July 1967 – 31 January 1969	3rd Aerospace Rescue and Recovery Group
	Presidential Unit Citation	1 February 1969 – 30 April 1970	3rd Aerospace Rescue and Recovery Group
	Presidential Unit Citation	1 May 1970 – 31 March 1972	3rd Aerospace Rescue and Recovery Group
	Presidential Unit Citation	1 April 1972 – 31 January 1973	3rd Aerospace Rescue and Recovery Group
	Air Force Meritorious Unit Award	1 June 2008 – 31 May 2010	563rd Rescue Group
	Air Force Outstanding Unit Award with Combat "V" Device	1 July 1966 – 31 December 1966	3rd Aerospace Rescue and Recovery Group
	Air Force Outstanding Unit Award with Combat "V" Device	1 January 2010 – 31 December 2010	563rd Rescue Group
	Air Force Outstanding Unit Award	1 October 2003 – 31 October 2004	563rd Rescue Group
	Air Force Outstanding Unit Award	1 November 2004 – 31 July 2006	563rd Rescue Group
	Air Force Outstanding Unit Award	1 June 2006 – 31 May 2008	563rd Rescue Group
	Philippine Republic Presidential Unit Citation	17 October 1944 – 4 July 1945	3rd Emergency Rescue Squadron
	Korean Presidential Unit Citation	25 June 1950 – 30 June 1951	3rd Rescue Squadron (later 3rd Air Rescue Squadron)
	Korean Presidential Unit Citation	1 July 1951 – 31 March 1953	3rd Air Rescue Squadron (later 3rd Air Rescue Group)
	Vietnamese Gallantry Cross with Palm	8 January 1966 – 28 July 1969	3rd Aerospace Rescue and Recovery Group
	Vietnamese Gallantry Cross with Palm	1 April 1966 – 28 January 1973	3rd Aerospace Rescue and Recovery Group

Campaign Streamer	Campaign	Dates	Notes
	New Guinea	2 September 1944 – 31 December 1944	3rd Emergency Rescue Squadron
	Western Pacific	17 April 1944 – 2 September 1945	3rd Emergency Rescue Squadron
	Leyte	17 October 1944 – 1 July 1945	3rd Emergency Rescue Squadron
	Luzon	15 December 1944 – 4 July 1945	3rd Emergency Rescue Squadron
	Southern Philippines	27 February 1945 – 4 July 1945	3rd Emergency Rescue Squadron
	China Defensive	2 September 1944 – 4 May 1945	3rd Emergency Rescue Squadron
	China Offensive	5 May 1945 – 2 September 1945	3rd Emergency Rescue Squadron
	Ryukus	26 March 1945 – 2 July 1945	3rd Emergency Rescue Squadron
	World War II Army of Occupation (Japan)	3 September 1945 – 27 April 1952	3rd Emergency Rescue Squadron (later 3rd Rescue Squadron, 3rd Air Rescue Squadron, 3rd Air Rescue Group)
	UN Defensive	27 June 1950 – 15 September 1950	3rd Rescue Squadron (later 3rd Air Rescue Squadron)
	UN Offensive	16 September 1950 – 2 November 1950	3rd Air Rescue Squadron
	CCF Intervention	3 November 1950 – 24 January 1951	3rd Air Rescue Squadron
	1st UN Counteroffensive	25 January 1951 – 21 April 1951	3rd Air Rescue Squadron
	CCF Spring Offensive	22 April 1951 – 9 July 1951	3rd Air Rescue Squadron
	UN Summer-Fall Offensive	9 July 1951 – 27 November 1951	3rd Air Rescue Squadron
	Second Korean Winter	28 November 1951 – 30 April 1952	3rd Air Rescue Squadron
	Korea Summer-Fall 1952	1 May 1952 – 30 November 1952	3rd Air Rescue Squadron (later 3rd Air Rescue Group)
	Third Korean Winter	1 December 1952 – 30 April 1953	3rd Air Rescue Group)
	Korea Summer-Fall 1953	1 May 1953 – 27 July 1953	3rd Air Rescue Group)
	Vietnam Defensive	8 January 1966 – 30 January 1966	3rd Aerospace Rescue and Recovery Group)
	Vietnam Air	31 January 1966 – 28 June 1966	3rd Aerospace Rescue and Recovery Group)
	Vietnam Air Offensive	29 June 1966 – 8 March 1967	3rd Aerospace Rescue and Recovery Group)
	Vietnam Air Offensive, Phase II	9 March 1967 – 31 March 1968	3rd Aerospace Rescue and Recovery Group)
	Vietnam Air/Ground	22 January 1968 – 7 July 1968	3rd Aerospace Rescue and Recovery Group)
	Vietnam Air Offensive, Phase III	1 April 1968 – 31 October 1968	3rd Aerospace Rescue and Recovery Group)
	Vietnam Air Offensive, Phase IV	1 November 1968 – 22 February 1969	3rd Aerospace Rescue and Recovery Group)
	Tet 1969/Counteroffensive	23 February 1969 – 8 June 1969	3rd Aerospace Rescue and Recovery Group)
	Vietnam Summer-Fall 1969	9 June 1969 – 31 October 1969	3rd Aerospace Rescue and Recovery Group)
	Vietnam Winter-Spring 1970	3 November 1969 – 30 April 1970	3rd Aerospace Rescue and Recovery Group)
	Sanctuary Counteroffensive	1 May 1970 – 30 June 1970	3rd Aerospace Rescue and Recovery Group)
	Southwest Monsoon	1 July 1970 – 30 November 1970	3rd Aerospace Rescue and Recovery Group)
	Commando Hunt V	1 December 1970 – 14 May 1971	3rd Aerospace Rescue and Recovery Group)
	Commando Hunt VI	15 May 1971 – 31 July 1971	3rd Aerospace Rescue and Recovery Group)
	Commando Hunt VII	1 November 1971 – 29 March 1972	3rd Aerospace Rescue and Recovery Group)
	Vietnam Ceasefire Campaign	39 March 1972 – 28 January 1973	3rd Aerospace Rescue and Recovery Group)

== See also ==
Media related to 563d Rescue Group (United States Air Force) at Wikimedia Commons

- List of United States Air Force Groups
- List of United States Air Force rescue squadrons
- B-17 Flying Fortress units of the United States Army Air Forces
- List of B-29 Superfortress operators
- List of C-47 Skytrain operators
- List of C-130 Hercules operators
