= Dissimilar air combat training =

US air combat training system

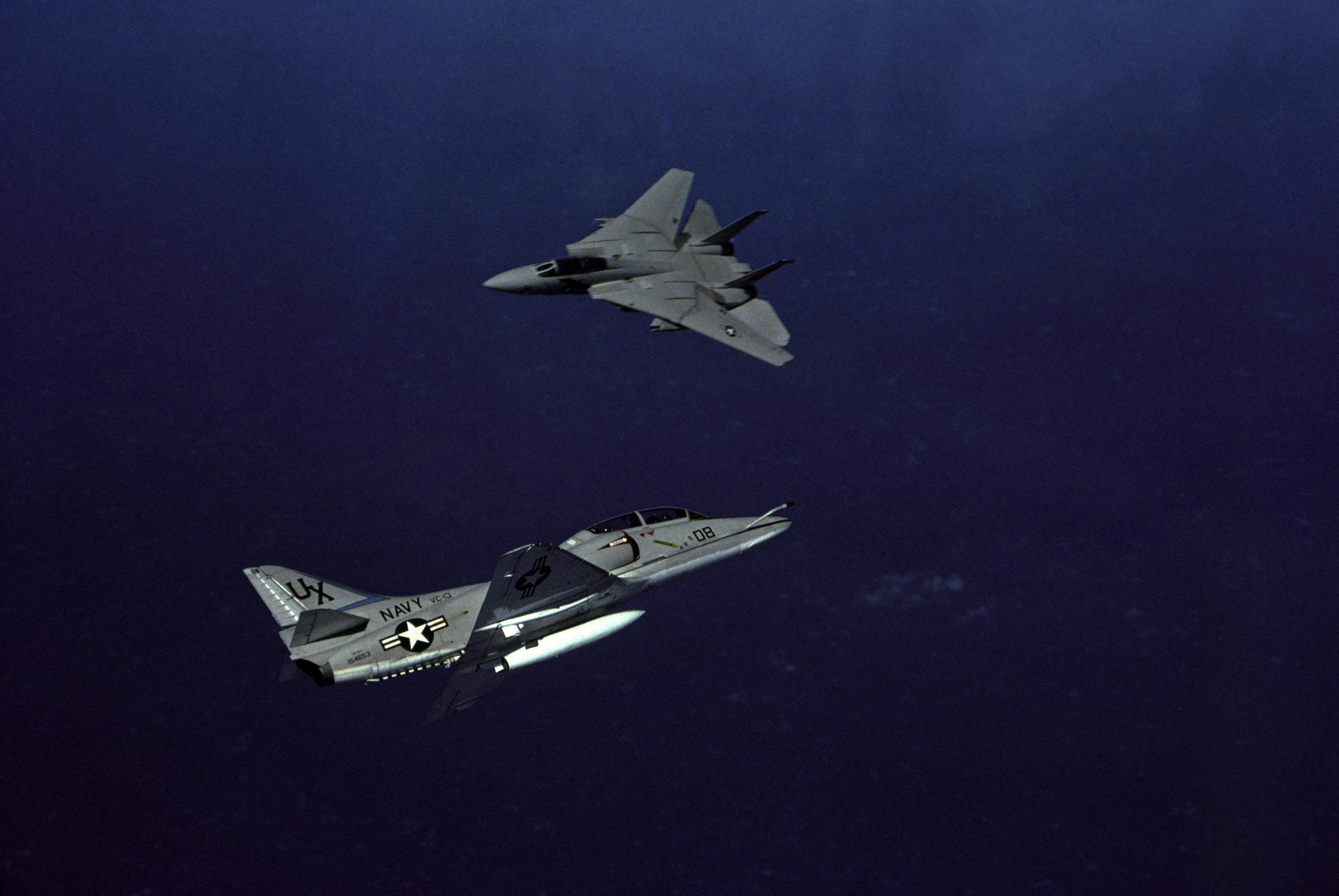
A US Navy Douglas TA-4F Skyhawk and a Grumman F-14 Tomcat, both belonging to VFC-13, engage in dissimilar air combat training

Dissimilar air combat training (DACT) was introduced as a formal part of US air combat training after disappointing aerial combat exchange rates in the Vietnam War.

Traditionally, pilots would undertake air combat training against similar aircraft. For example, pilots of single seat Vought F-8 Crusaders would seldom train against the dual seat McDonnell Douglas F-4 Phantom IIs, and almost never against Douglas A-4 Skyhawk attack aircraft and never as part of a formal syllabus. From 1965 to 1968, US pilots in combat over North Vietnam were pitted against Soviet-built Vietnam People's Air Force aircraft, including the smaller, more nimble subsonic Mikoyan-Gurevich MiG-17 and the supersonic Mikoyan-Gurevich MiG-21. Pilots in US Air Force (USAF) Republic F-105 Thunderchiefs were barely able to exceed parity and pilots in Phantoms and Crusaders were not able to achieve the hugely lopsided win–loss ratio achieved over Korea and in World War II. In fact, air combat maneuvering (ACM) was not practiced by all fighter squadrons for a variety of reasons.

The USAF had deemphasized ACM because most air combat doctrine since the late 1950s centered on delivering nuclear weapons over Europe or firing missiles at beyond-visual-range (BVR) at bombers, and not on daylight dogfighting which was thought to be obsolete in the missile age. The primary US fighter used against North Vietnamese MiGs, the F-4 Phantom, did not even have an internal gun. US pilots were finding themselves hard-pressed to prevail over the nimble Vietnam People's Air Force (VPAF) MiGs, which by late 1966 had grown to be a real threat to US aircraft operating over the North.

Even more vexing were rules of engagement (ROE) that did not even permit BVR (Beyond Visual Range) firing of missiles. Radar-guided AIM-7 Sparrows experienced high failure rates, and the short-range AIM-9 Sidewinder was ineffective in many dogfighting maneuvering situations. Phantom training against other Phantoms did not reflect the reality of a target that was smaller, smokeless and more agile. Ever since the success of the American Volunteer Group Flying Tigers in World War II, aerial tacticians have advocated exploiting differences in aircraft to maximize one's own advantages while minimizing the disadvantages of one's own platform, thus neutralizing the superior maneuverability and climbing speed of, for example, a Mitsubishi Zero compared to the rugged, fast-diving and powerfully armed Curtiss P-40 Tomahawk. US pilots found themselves the victims of VPAF MiG-21s using the Flying Tigers "hit and run" tactics against them.

The US Air Force began to reinstate DACT in 1966 in Air Defense Command. Its Convair F-106 Delta Dart interceptor squadrons had been tasked with a worldwide mission to send expeditionary forces overseas to conduct air defense operations as necessary. Realizing that they would encounter MiG fighters, not Soviet bombers, in distant hotspots, the Command set about to teach itself dissimilar air combat tactics. Convair F-102 Delta Daggers and Lockheed F-104 Starfighters functioned as adversary aircraft for the F-106s, and DACT competency became a required portion of an interceptor pilot's training.

In 1968, the US Navy took a hard look at its air-to-air problems over North Vietnam and tasked Captain Frank Ault to come up with recommendations to improve the situation. His report became known as the Ault Report. It resulted in the establishment of TOPGUN and incorporation of DACT into the syllabus. The United States Navy Fighter Weapons School adopted the nimble subsonic A-4 Skyhawk to simulate subsonic Soviet fighters, while the Northrop F-5E Tiger simulated the supersonic MiG-21 fighter. Both the Skyhawk and Tiger were used in the 1986 film Top Gun. After aerial combat resumed again in 1972 over North Vietnam the Navy had numerous TOPGUN graduates who were ready to take on the VPAF MiG-17, MiG-19 and MiG-21 pilots that had also been training and were prepared for the resumption of hostilities. The Navy's win/loss exchange ratio soared to over 20:1 before the loss of a Marine Phantom brought it back to 12.5:1 by 1973; an unqualified testament to the value of the TOPGUN approach and DACT. The USAF did not improve its exchange ratio at all in the same period and hurriedly began to adopt DACT, even to the point of inviting Navy Crusaders and their pilots to visit a base in Thailand in 1972 to conduct DACT with the F-4 Phantoms based there.

In 1970 the Marine Corps and the Navy found out about Air Defense Command's DACT training program, Operation College Dart, and began to fly practice air-to-air combat missions with F-106 squadrons in the summer of that year. Tactical Air Command finally began to participate in late 1972 when it sent F-4Es to function as adversaries for the F-106s of the 5th Fighter Interceptor Squadron. In the summer of 1973, the 64th Fighter Weapons Squadron became operational at Nellis AFB with T-38s as its "red team" aircraft.

The A-4 Skyhawk has since been replaced by the McDonnell Douglas T-45 Goshawk, a navalized version of the British BAE Hawk trainer. General Dynamics F-16 Fighting Falcons have been used to simulate later generation Soviet fighters such as the MiG-29. The now-retired Grumman F-14 Tomcat was also used in various paint schemes to simulate Iranian F-14s, as well as the large Sukhoi Su-27. The USAF has reportedly also used captured or purchased Soviet fighters for DACT on occasions.

== See also ==
- Aggressor squadron
- 4477th Test and Evaluation Squadron
