= Carrier Airborne Early Warning Weapons School =

U.S. naval aviation school

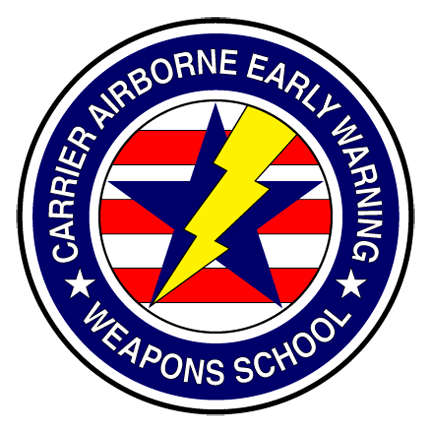
Patch worn by graduates of the CAEWWS HEWTI Course

The United States Navy's Carrier Airborne Early Warning Weapons School, more popularly known as CAEWWS (historically known as TOPDOME), is an American military unit that develops and teaches E-2D and E-2C Hawkeye tactics, techniques, and procedures (TTP) to selected Naval Aviators and Naval Flight Officers. CAEWWS originated in the early 1980s as the tactics department of VAW-110 on Naval Air Station Miramar, California, but later commissioned on 13 July 1988 as an independent command. Today CAEWWS is incorporated into the Naval Aviation Warfighting Development Center (NAWDC) as the command and control (C2) weapons school along with the Navy Strike Fighter Weapons School (TOPGUN), Airborne Electromagnetic Attack Weapons School (HAVOC), Navy Rotary Wing Weapons School (SEAWOLF and SEAHUNTER), Maritime Intelligence Surveillance Reconnaissance Weapons School (MISR), and STRIKE (historically known as Strike University).

== History ==
At its inception, CAEWWS worked to develop innovative tactics involving the E-2 in conjunction with the other Desert Six commands, a collection of weapons schools and test squadrons which included TOPGUN, Naval Strike Warfare Center, MAWTS-1, VX-5 and VX-4 (known as VX-9 today). On 12 June 1989, the first E-2C Advanced Mission Commander Course (AMCC) convened, charged with providing graduate-level tactical training for Hawkeye aircrew.

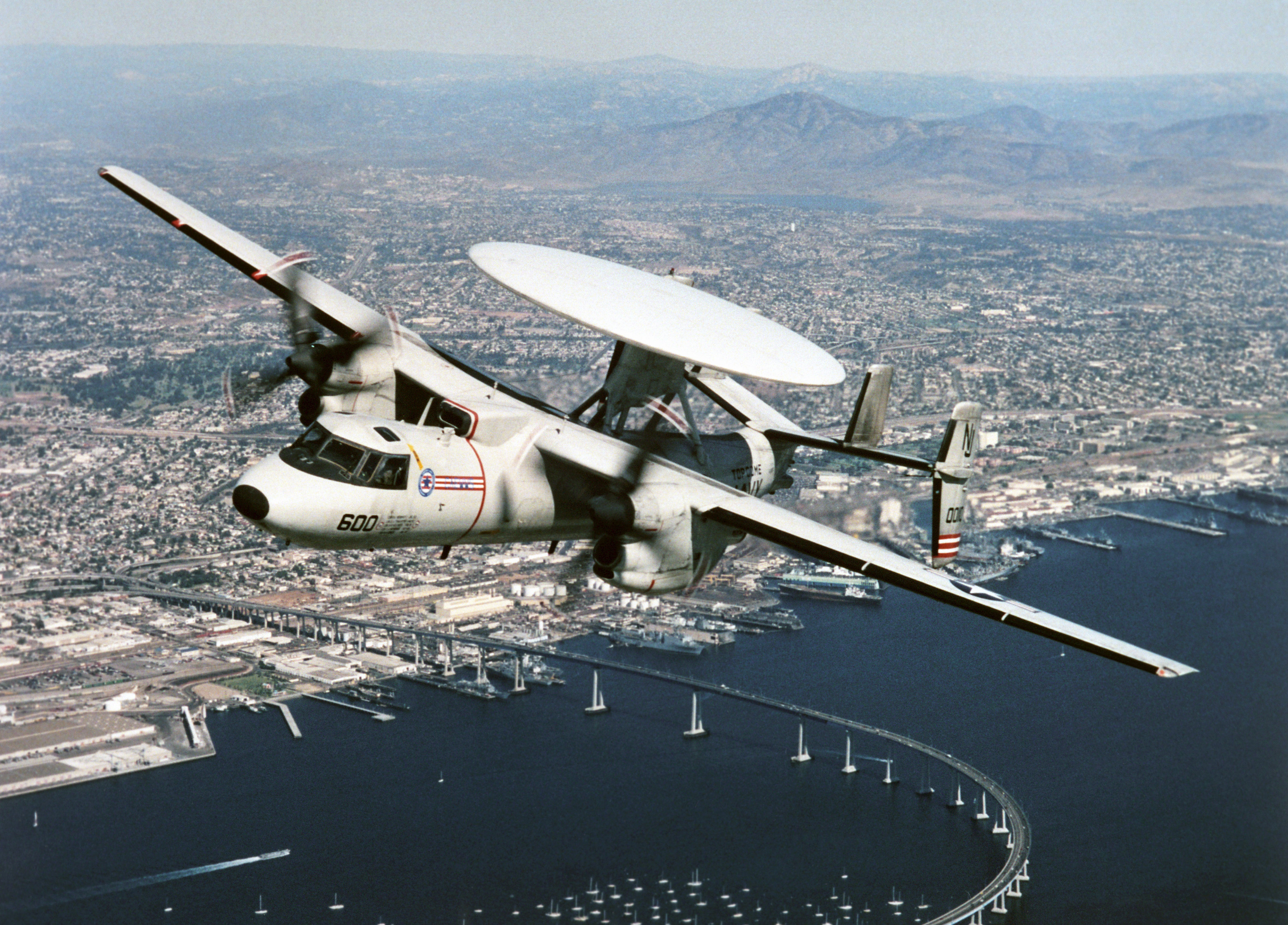
CAEWWS E-2C in flight over the San Diego–Coronado Bridge

Less than a decade after becoming an independent command, the US Navy reincorporated CAEWWS. On 11 July 1996, CAEWWS and TOPGUN moved from NAS Miramar and joined Strike University as the foundation for the Naval Strike and Air Warfare Center (NSAWC) at Naval Air Station Fallon. The close proximity of weapons school instructors supporting a variety of platforms has been central to the success of NSAWC. The cooperation found between weapons schools is essential in the development of tactics, creation of WTIs, and fleet support. Since its incorporation into NSAWC (today NADWC), CAEWWS expanded its academic instruction and execution to include nearly a dozen courses focused on power projection, air defense, electronic warfare, and joint and coalition interoperability. Ultimately though, the focus of the weapons school would evolve as the number of courses narrowed. In the early 2000s, AMCC transitioned to include the production of Weapons Tactics Instructors (WTIs) while continuing to instruct fleet squadron mission and aircraft commanders. In 2013 came the establishment of the ACCLOGWING Weapons School (ACCLWS), which allowed for transferring some fleet training responsibilities.

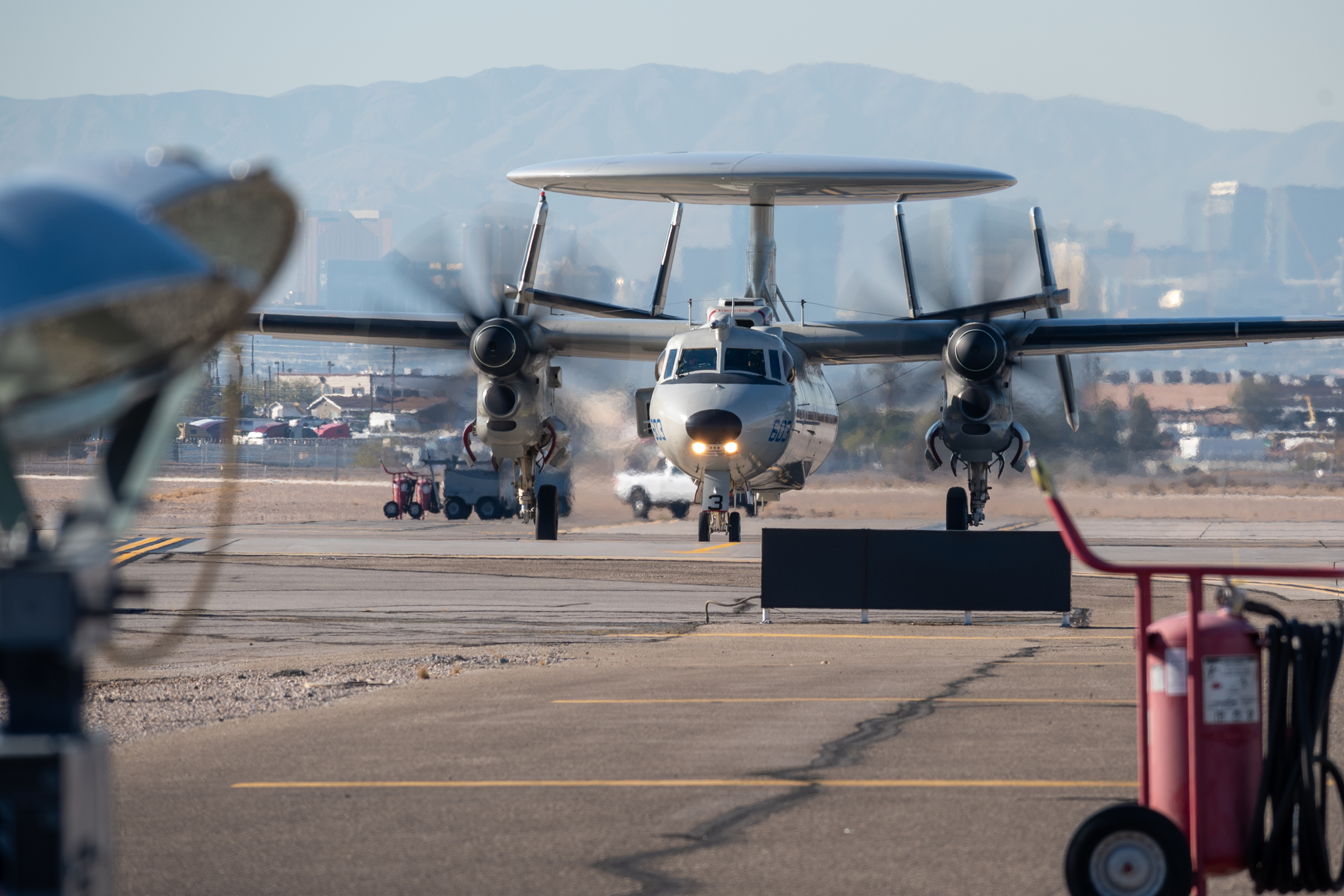
E-2D operated by CAEWWS as part of the HEWTI course live-flight phase at USAF Weapons School Integration

In addition to the development of E-2C/D TTP, CAEWWS today focuses on the Hawkeye WTI (HEWTI) Course, integration with other warfighting development centers in the creation of joint aviation and fleet-wide TTP, execution of the Integrated Air Defense Course (IADC), C2 instruction at Air Wing Fallon, and provides inputs to the acquisition process in the form of requirements and priorities for research and development (R&D), procurement, and training systems.

== See also ==
- History of the United States Navy
- List of United States Navy aircraft squadrons
- Naval Aviation Warfighting Development Center (USN)
- United States Navy Strike Fighter Tactics Instructor program (TOPGUN)
- USAF Weapons School
- Exercise Red Flag
- Qualified Weapons Instructor (United Kingdom)
