= Qualified Weapons Instructor =

Qualified Weapons Instructor (QWI) (queue-why) is a qualification given to graduates of the British Armed Forces Qualified Weapons Instructor courses. It is the equivalent to the United States Air Force (USAF) Weapons School Course or United States Navy (USN) Naval Aviation Warfighting Development Center warfare schools (including United States Navy Strike Fighter Tactics Instructor program or TOPGUN).

QWI is the hardest to achieve flying qualification in the MOD with courses only ran annually and more selective in nature with candidates who are generally accepted as “best of their peers”. As such graduates of a QWI course are entitled to wear a QWI 'patch' on their uniform, denoting their status as an expert practitioners. QWIs are experts on their own platform or system; Cross-domain tactical capability integrators, and Capability influencers for future development and delivery. The QWI course is run by the Royal Air Force, although it is open to applicants from other Services dependent on qualification. While QWI, TOPGUN and the United States Air Force Weapons School were traditionally associated with the employment of kinetic energy weapons and with historical origins in the combat aircraft community, modern warfare experts recognize that kinetic and non-kinetic weapons systems are critical in current and future combat engagements. This is reflected in the expansion of the respective warfare schools over the past two decades Recognizing this the QWI qualification has expanded to include several non-kinetic fields and now strives to achieve Full Spectrum Warfare through effects based warfare. QWI is not to be confused with QFI Qualified Flying Instructor which is a non-tactical qualification.

== Overview ==
Recognizing that modern warfare requires effects-based operations and full-spectrum dominance the qualification is available in the following fields:.

- QWI - Typhoon/F35/RPAS/C2/Rotary/Space/Air Mobility and Intelligence

The courses last between 7 and 9 months and usually culminate in Exercise COBRA WARRIOR delivery and assessed by the Air and Space Warfare Centre. This exercise demonstrates the Find, Fix, Track, Target, Engage, Assess (F2T2EA) kill chains and requires coordinated efforts among all participants to successfully achieve the commander's objectives. Fast Jet QWIs plan for kinetic weapons effects (both air-air and air-ground). F35 QWIs perform the additional role of SEAD by taking advantage of the aircraft's fifth generation capabilities. RPAS QWIs plan to both the kinetic and non-kinetic platform capabilities. Typhoon, F35, and RPAS QWIs perform the roles of ATTACK/CoA/SEAD Functional Team Leads, as well as training to act as Mission Commander. All QWI students demonstrate an ability to integrate their capabilities across a wide variety of mission sets.

All graduates are awarded 'QWI' annotation and are recognized as experts for their respective platforms and fields through continued merit, professionalism and achievement. At international training events, such as Exercise RED FLAG, platform QWIs are held in the same regard and to the same standard as USAF and USN patch wearers and are often employed in the tactical mentor role both in exercises and in real world operations.

Pilots of other air forces can attend the school through the Ministry of Defence's International Defence Training Programme.

== See also ==
- No. 54 Squadron RAF
