= Dan Pedersen =

American naval aviator

Daniel Arthur Pedersen
- Military career
- Allegiance: United States
- Branch: United States Navy
- Rank: Captain
- Nickname: Yank/Duke
- Commands: USS Ranger; USS Wichita; Carrier Air Wing Fifteen; VF-143; Navy Fighter Weapons School
- Conflicts: Vietnam War
- Other work: Top Gun: An American Story

Dan Pedersen is a retired United States Navy Captain, credited as being the leading force behind the creation of the United States Navy Fighter Weapons School program known as “TOPGUN”.

== Military career ==
Pedersen joined the Navy in 1953 as an enlisted mechanic. In 1955, he was accepted into the Naval Aviation Cadet Program. After completing flight training on 1 March 1957, he was assigned to VF(AW)-3 flying the Douglas F4D Skyray.

In 1962, he reported to VF-121, the west coast Fleet Replacement Squadron, for transition training to fly the McDonnell F3H Demon following which he was assigned to VF-213. In February 1963, VF-213 embarked on an 8-month cruise onboard USS Hancock.

After transition training to fly the McDonnell-Douglas F-4 Phantom II he joined VF-92. The squadron deployed on the USS Enterprise (CVN-65) from 3 January to 18 July 1968.

In late 1968, Pedersen joined VF-121 at NAS Miramar as a tactics instructor.

In January 1969, the Navy published the Ault Report, which concluded that U.S. aircraft losses over North Vietnam stemmed in part from inadequate air-crew training in air combat maneuvering (ACM). The report recommended that an "Advanced Fighter Weapons School" be established at Naval Air Station Miramar under the control of VF-121 to revive and disseminate community fighter expertise throughout the fleet. The report stated that the Advanced Fighter Weapons School was to have: one Officer-in-charge (F-4 or F-8 Crusader pilot), three F-4 pilot instructors, three F-4 Radar Intercept Officer instructors, three F-8 pilot instructors and an Aviation Ordnance Officer. The school would train twenty (20) F-4 Phantom II aircrews and ten (10) F-8 Crusader Naval Aviators per year. The aircrew syllabus would consist of 25 hours per pilot/aircrew in the F-8 or F-4, 75 hours of classes and a course duration of four weeks. Pedersen was appointed as the first officer in charge of the school.

The U.S. Navy Fighter Weapons School was established on 3 March 1969. Following the implementation of the program, the Navy kill ratio in Vietnam went from 2.5:1 to 24:1.

He relinquished command of the school in mid-1969.

In February 1973 he joined VF-143 on the USS Enterprise and flew combat operations over Laos and Cambodia until the Enterprise returned to Pearl Harbor in June 1973. He was later appointed commander of VF-143 and the squadron embarked onboard USS America for a Mediterranean cruise from 3 January to 3 August 1974.

In April 1975, he joined Carrier Air Wing Fifteen aboard the USS Coral Sea in preparation for taking command of the wing. During this time, he flew fighter cover in support of the Mayaguez Incident.

In 1976, he was promoted to captain and subsequently attended the Prospective Commanding Officers Course. From 28 March 1978 to 21 December 1979 he commanded the tanker USS Wichita.

On 20 October 1980, he became the captain of the aircraft carrier USS Ranger. In April 1981 Airman Recruit Paul A. Trerice died in the Ranger's correctional custody unit. Trerice's father brought a lawsuit against Pedersen, Ranger's executive officer and others but the case was dismissed. On 11 June 1982 he relinquished command of Ranger and became deputy chief of staff for the Commander, U.S. Pacific Fleet at Pearl Harbor.

Due to political opposition as a result of Trerice's death, his name was removed from the 1983 promotion list to rear admiral and he retired from the Navy on 1 March 1983.

== Awards and decorations ==
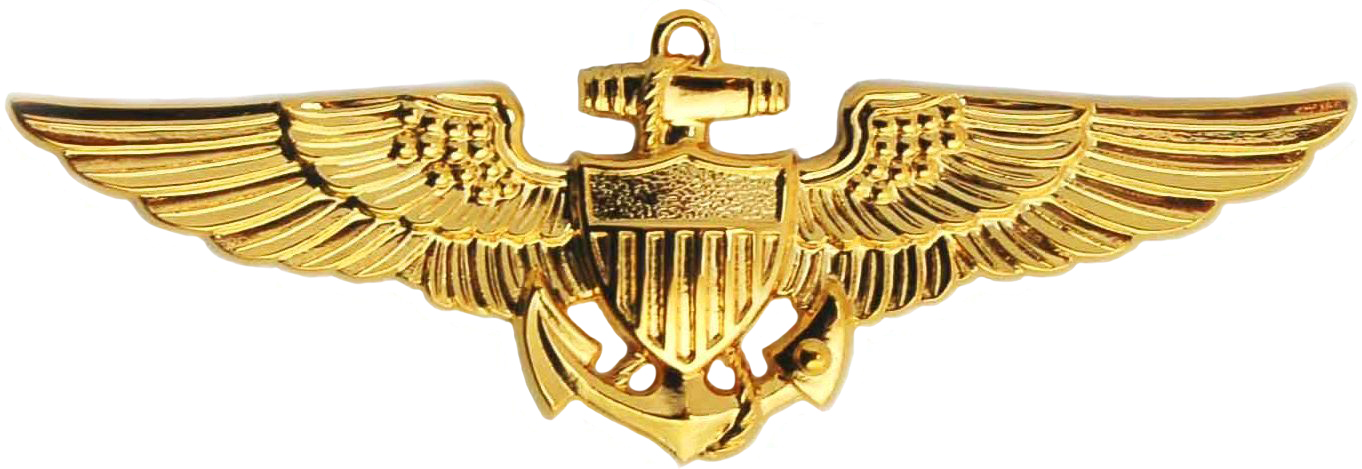

Naval aviator (United States)
Air Medal with three gold stars
Navy Commendation Medal with "V" device and two gold stars	Navy and Marine Corps Achievement Medal with one gold star	Combat Action Ribbon
Navy Unit Commendation with one bronze star	Meritorious Unit Commendation	Navy E Ribbon with one Battle "E" device
Navy Expeditionary Medal	National Defense Service Medal with one star	Korean Service Medal
Armed Forces Expeditionary Medal with one bronze star	Vietnam Service Medal with three stars	Vietnam Presidential Unit Citation
Republic of Vietnam Meritorious; Unit Citation (Gallantry Cross)	United Nations Service Medal Korea	Republic of Vietnam Campaign Medal

== Later life ==
The success of TOPGUN earned him the title the ‘Godfather of TOPGUN’.

In 2018, one year prior to the fiftieth anniversary of the founding of TOPGUN, Pedersen was honored at Palm Springs Air Museum Gala.

In 2019, his book TOPGUN: An American Story was published to critical acclaim. In the book he warned that U.S. naval aviators weren't getting enough flight time, weren't practicing dogfighting and that an over-reliance on technology risked repeating the situation that occurred in the early years of the Vietnam War.

== See also ==
- Top Gun (1986 film)
- Top Gun 2 (2022 film)
