= VAW-110 =

Carrier Airborne Early Warning Squadron 110
- Active: 20 April 1967 - 30 September 1994
- Country: United States
- Branch: United States Navy
- Type: Airborne Early Warning
- Role: Training
- Nickname(s): "Firebirds"

Carrier Airborne Early Warning Squadron 110 (VAW-110), nicknamed the "Firebirds", was an aviation unit of the United States Navy based at NAS Miramar. The Firebirds were a training squadron for the E-2 Hawkeyes. It was disestablished in September 1994.

== History ==
The unit had its beginnings on 20 April 1967 as Replacement Airborne Early Warning Squadron 110 (RVAW-110), which had been formed when VAW-11 was broken into six separate squadrons. In spite of its primary role in training, RVAW-110 acquired operational skills through deployments aboard the aircraft carriers USS Oriskany (CVA-34), USS Franklin D. Roosevelt (CVA-42), and USS Coral Sea (CVA-43) during the Vietnam War. RVAW 110 was known as the rag outfit and was the training arm of the Airborne Early Warning Squadrons. It consisted of E-1B's and E-2A's, and was stationed at NAS North Island before later moving to NAS Miramar.

=== 1960s ===
In July 1966, VAW-12 received the first E-2A Hawkeye, supplying detachments utilizing two different aircraft aboard ten Atlantic Fleet aircraft carriers in addition to training personnel for those detachments. With over 200 officers and 800 enlisted personnel, VAW -12 was reorganized as an Air Wing, and on 1 April 1967, Admiral T.E. Moore, Commander in Chief, U.S. Atlantic Fleet, commissioned Carrier Airborne Early Warning Wing Twelve with six operating squadrons.

=== 1970s ===
The squadron received the second generation E-2B Hawkeye aircraft in 1970, followed by the arrival of the E-2C on 31 May 1980. With the delivery of the first Advanced Radar Processing System (ARPS) aircraft in 1978, RVAW 110 trained Naval Flight Officers (NFOs), flight technicians, and maintenance personnel in both the APS-120 and APS-125 radars. This continued until 1980 when all east coast VAW squadrons completed transition to the APS-125.

=== 1980s ===
In May 1980, the 2F110 Operational Flight Trainer (OFT) was delivered and ready for use by early May 1981. The OFT is designed to simulate actual in-flight emergencies and train replacement pilots to handle such emergencies prior to receiving E-2C training flights. The 15F8B Weapon System Trainer (WST) arrived in October 1984 and was accepted for training on 19 November 1984. This arrival provided staff and Replacement NFOs with the latest technology for the Grumman Hawkeye.

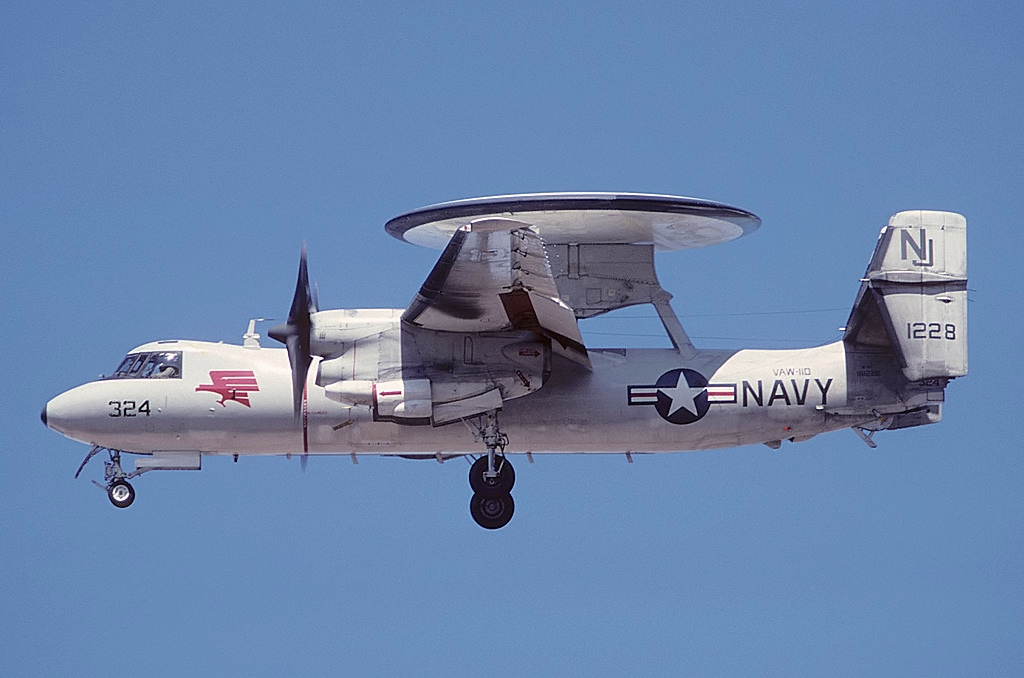
A VAW-110 E-2C in 1989.

In the early 1980s, VAW-110’s tactics department adjusted to become the Carrier Airborne Early Warning Weapons School (known as TOPDOME), later commissioning as an independent command in July 1988.

In 1987, VAW-110 began training personnel for the Grumman C-2 Greyhound carrier onboard delivery aircraft. Later it also trained crews for new variants of the E-2C Hawkeye.

=== 1990s ===
After more than 27 years of service under two designations, VAW-110 was disestablished on 30 September 1994. Its duties were assumed by VAW-120.

=== In popular culture ===
VF-1 Emblem from Top Gun

The unique firebird patch for VAW-110 was adapted for use in the films Top Gun (1986) and Top Gun: Maverick (2022). The firebird emblem is used in the films to denote the fictional VF-1 Navy flight squadron to which characters Pete "Maverick" Mitchell (Tom Cruise) and Nick "Goose" Bradshaw (Anthony Edwards) belong.

The emblem can be seen on the characters' flight helmet, Mitchell's motorcycle and a few other places.

== See also ==
- History of the United States Navy
- List of inactive United States Navy aircraft squadrons
