= Ault Report =

Navy report that led to the creation of TOPGUN

The Ault Report, or more formally, the Air-to-Air Missile System Capability Review, was a sweeping study of United States Navy air-to-air missile performance during the period of 1965 to 1968, conducted by Navy Captain Frank Ault. The study was initiated at the behest of Admiral Tom Moorer, Chief of Naval Operations (CNO), who had taken office in August 1967. He was disturbed by the dismal performance of Navy air-to-air missiles in engagements with North Vietnamese fighter jets. Admiral Moorer tasked the Naval Air Systems Command (NAVAIRSYSCOM) to conduct "an in-depth examination of the entire process by which Air-to-Air missile systems are acquired and employed" and further directed that Ault be placed in charge of the effort.

== Background ==
Following the Korean War the United States military adopted the view that airborne radar and air-to-air missiles made guns and dogfighting obsolete. The radar-guided AIM-7 Sparrow would destroy enemy aircraft beyond visual range, while the radar-guided/infrared AIM-4 Falcon (United States Air Force (USAF) only) and infrared AIM-9 Sidewinder would destroy enemy aircraft at close range. Guns were eliminated on new aircraft such as the F-4 Phantom II and the Navy disestablished its last Fleet Air Gunnery Unit in 1960.

During Operation Rolling Thunder, the performance of air-to-air missiles was found to be disappointing with kill rates of 9.2% for the AIM-4, 9.2% for the AIM-7 and 18% for the AIM-9. Meanwhile the Vietnam People's Air Force's agile MiG-17, MiG-19 and MiG-21s successfully outmanoeuvred air-to-air missiles and used hit and run tactics and/or greater manoeuvrability to shoot down the heavier and less agile F-4s and USAF F-105s using their guns and infrared AA-2 missiles.

== Ault Report study scope ==
Ault directed a team of five experts who addressed five basic questions to be addressed by the study:

1. Is industry delivering to the Navy a high quality product, designed and built to specifications?
2. Are Fleet support organizations delivering a high quality product to the CVA’s (aircraft carriers) and to forward sites ashore?
3. Do shipboard and squadron organizations (afloat and ashore) launch an optimally ready combat aircraft-missile system?
4. Does the combat aircrew fully understand and exploit the capabilities of the aircraft-missile system? (Corollary question: Is the aircraft-missile system properly designed and configured for the air-to-air mission?)
5. Is the air-to-air missile system (aircraft/fire control system/missile) repair and rework program returning a quality product to the Fleet?

== Creation of the Navy Fighter Weapons School (TOPGUN) ==
Among the many findings of the Ault Report was the need for an "Advanced Fighter Weapons School" to revive the community fighter expertise that had been resident in the Fleet Air Gunnery Units (FAGU), which had been disbanded some time before. The report suggested that such a school be created under the auspices of VF-121, the West Coast F-4 Replacement Air Group, which had responsibility for training F-4 aircrews. This recommendation was accepted by the CNO and VF-121 instructors subsequently formulated and established an advanced syllabus for fighter employment.

Eventually the United States Navy Fighter Weapons School ("TOPGUN") was created.

== Air Combat Maneuvering Range ==
One of the critical findings of the Ault Report was that many of the missile failures were caused by out of envelope firings due to unfamiliarity of the aircrews with the dynamically changing launch acceptability regions (LAR). The report proposed to create an instrumented range to help aircrews become familiar with the complexities of firing their air-to-air missiles. This led to development of the Air Combat Maneuvering Range (ACMR) at MCAS Yuma for use by aircraft flying out of NAS Miramar. The Air Force was faced with the same problem and also began development of a similar Air Combat Maneuvering Instrumentation (ACMI) range at Nellis AFB.

== Project Red Baron ==
The USAF conducted an exhaustive study of air-to-air encounters in Southeast Asia titled "Project Red Baron", named in tribute to Manfred von Richthofen, and included all service experiences in the scope of effort. The first effort reported out in December 1966 as Project Red Baron I (declassified in 2001), Red Baron II reported out in 1973 and Red Baron III in 1974. The Red Baron I findings were referenced in the Ault Report and it and the later reports also resulted in significant improvements in USAF training such as creation of Operation Red Flag at Nellis AFB and establishment of aggressor squadrons worldwide to provide dissimilar air combat training.
