= Frank Ault =

U.S. Navy officer (1922–2006)

Captain Frank Ault (1922 – August 25, 2006) was an officer in the United States Navy.

He is best remembered for leading a classified study in 1968 that led to the creation of the Navy Fighter Weapons School, or TOPGUN. Adm. Tom Moorer, the Chief of Naval Operations (CNO), was disturbed over less-than-expected performance of Navy fighters against the North Vietnamese MiGs in the first stage of the Vietnam War. From 1965 to 1968, the exchange ratio was at best 2.5 to one. Moorer directed Ault to conduct a sweeping review of aircraft, aircrew, organizational, training and missile performance and make recommendations for improvements. The official title of the report was "Air-to-Air Missile System Capability Review", but it became known simply as the Ault Report.

Frank Ault is not the namesake of Ault Field at NAS Whidbey Island in Oak Harbor, Washington, which honors Commander William B. Ault, an air group commander who died in 1942's Battle of the Coral Sea—although the latter Ault did command the U.S. aircraft carrier named for the battle. He is the namesake of the Naval Strike and Air Warfare Center auditorium at NAS Fallon in Nevada.
