= Exercise Red Flag =

Military exercise

Exercise Red Flag Red Flag – Nellis
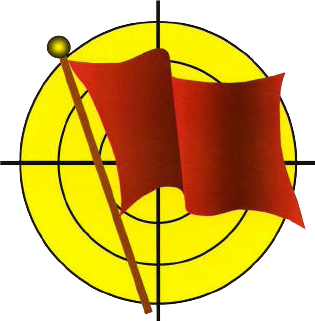

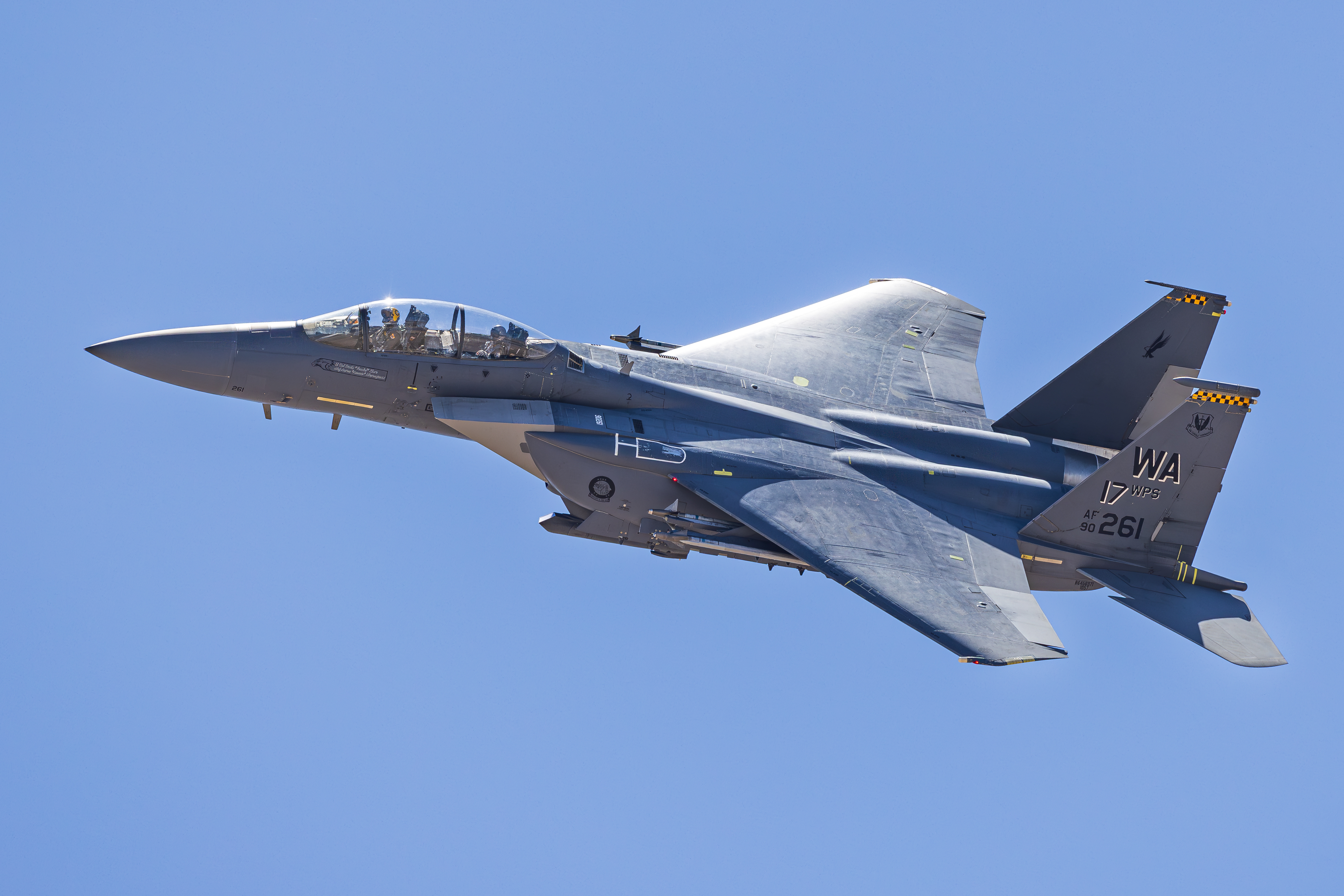
- A US Air Force F-15E Strike Eagle taking part in a Red Flag exercise, departing Nellis Air Force Base in July 2023
- Status: Active
- Genre: Military exercise
- Frequency: Three times a year
- Venue: Nellis Air Force Base, Nevada; Nevada Test and Training Range
- Locations: Las Vegas, Nevada
- Coordinates: 36°14′10.32″N 115°02′03.32″W
- Country: United States
- Inaugurated: 29 November 1975 (50 years, 11 months ago)
- Founder: Tactical Air Command
- Organiser: 414th Combat Training Squadron
- Website: www.nellis.af.mil/About/High-End-Training/Red-Flag-Nellis/

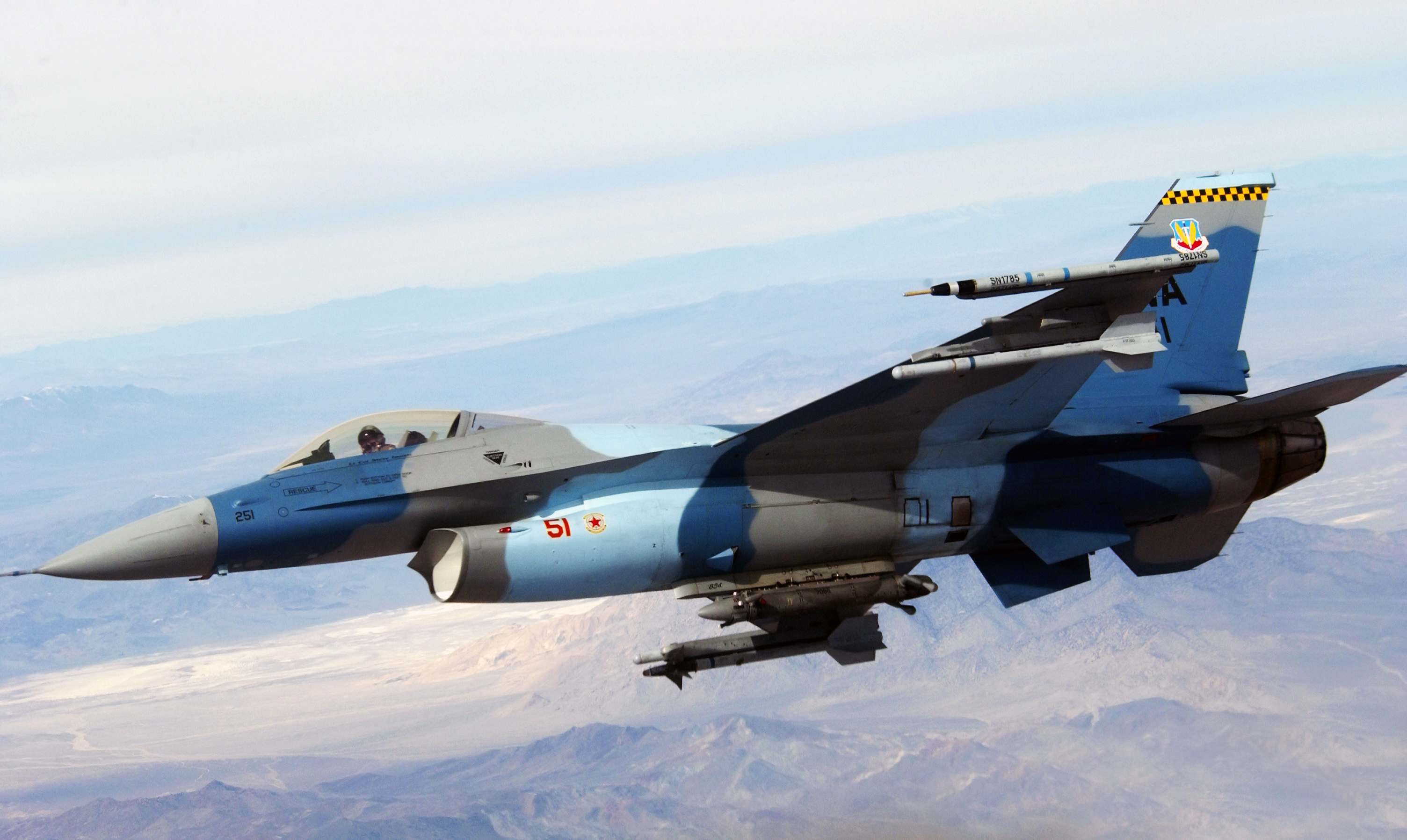
F-16C aggressor aircraft during Red Flag 06-1

Exercise Red Flag (also Red Flag – Nellis) is a two-week advanced aerial combat training exercise held several times a year by the United States Air Force (USAF). It aims to offer realistic air-combat training for military pilots and other flight crew members from the United States and allied countries.

Each year, three to six Red Flag exercises are held at Nellis Air Force Base, Nevada, while up to four more, dubbed Red Flag – Alaska, are held at Eielson Air Force Base, Alaska.

First held on 29 November 1975, Red Flag exercises bring together aircrews from the USAF, United States Navy (USN), United States Marine Corps (USMC), United States Army (USA) and numerous NATO and allied nations' air forces.

Red Flag exercises are conducted under the control of the United States Air Force Warfare Center (USAFWC) at Nellis. They are run by the 414th Combat Training Squadron (414 CTS) of the 57th Wing (57 WG). They use "enemy" hardware and live ammunition for bombing exercises within the adjacent Nevada Test and Training Range (NTTR).

== Organization ==
The 414 CTS mission is to maximize the combat readiness and survivability of participants by providing a realistic training environment and a pre-flight and post-flight training forum that encourages a free exchange of ideas. To accomplish this, combat units from the United States and its allied countries engage in realistic combat training scenarios carefully conducted within the Nellis Range Complex. The Nellis Range complex is located northwest of Las Vegas and covers an area of 60 nautical miles (111 km) by 100 nautical miles (190 km), about half the area of Switzerland. This space allows the exercises to be on an enormous scale.

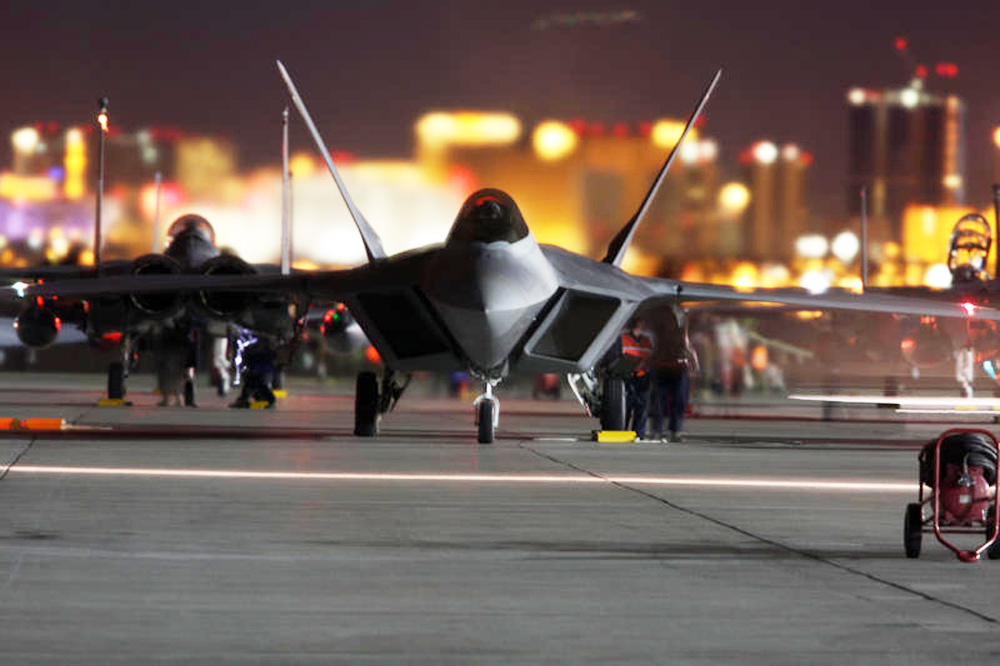
A F-22 Raptor during Red Flag 10–2 with Las Vegas in the background

In a typical Red Flag exercise, Blue Forces (friendly) engage Red Forces (hostile) in realistic combat situations.

Blue Forces are made up of units from the Air Combat Command (ACC), Air Mobility Command (AMC), Air Force Global Strike Command (AFGSC), Air Force Special Operations Command (AFSOC), United States Air Forces Europe (USAFE), Pacific Air Forces (PACAF), Air National Guard (ANG), Air Force Reserve Command (AFRC), and Air Force Space Command (AFSPC), aviation units of the U.S. Navy, U.S. Marine Corps and U.S. Army, the Royal Air Force, Royal Canadian Air Force, and Royal Australian Air Force, as well as other allied air forces and fleet air arms. They are led by a Blue Forces commander, who coordinates the units in an "employment plan" scheme of operation.

Red Forces (adversary forces) are composed of the 57th Wing's 57th Adversary Tactics Group (57 ATG), flying F-16s from the 64th Aggressor Squadron (64 AGRS) and F-35s from the 65th Aggressor Squadron (65 AGRS) to provide realistic air threats through the emulation of opposition tactics. The Red Forces are also augmented by other U.S. Air Force, U.S. Navy, and U.S. Marine Corps units flying in concert with the 507th Air Defense Aggressor Squadron's (507 ADAS) electronic ground defenses and communications, and radar jamming equipment. The 527th Space Aggressor Squadron (527 SAS), an Active Duty unit, and the 26th Space Aggressor Squadron (26 SAS), an Air Force Reserve Command unit, also provide GPS jamming. Additionally, the Red Force command and control organization simulates a realistic enemy integrated air defense system (IADS).

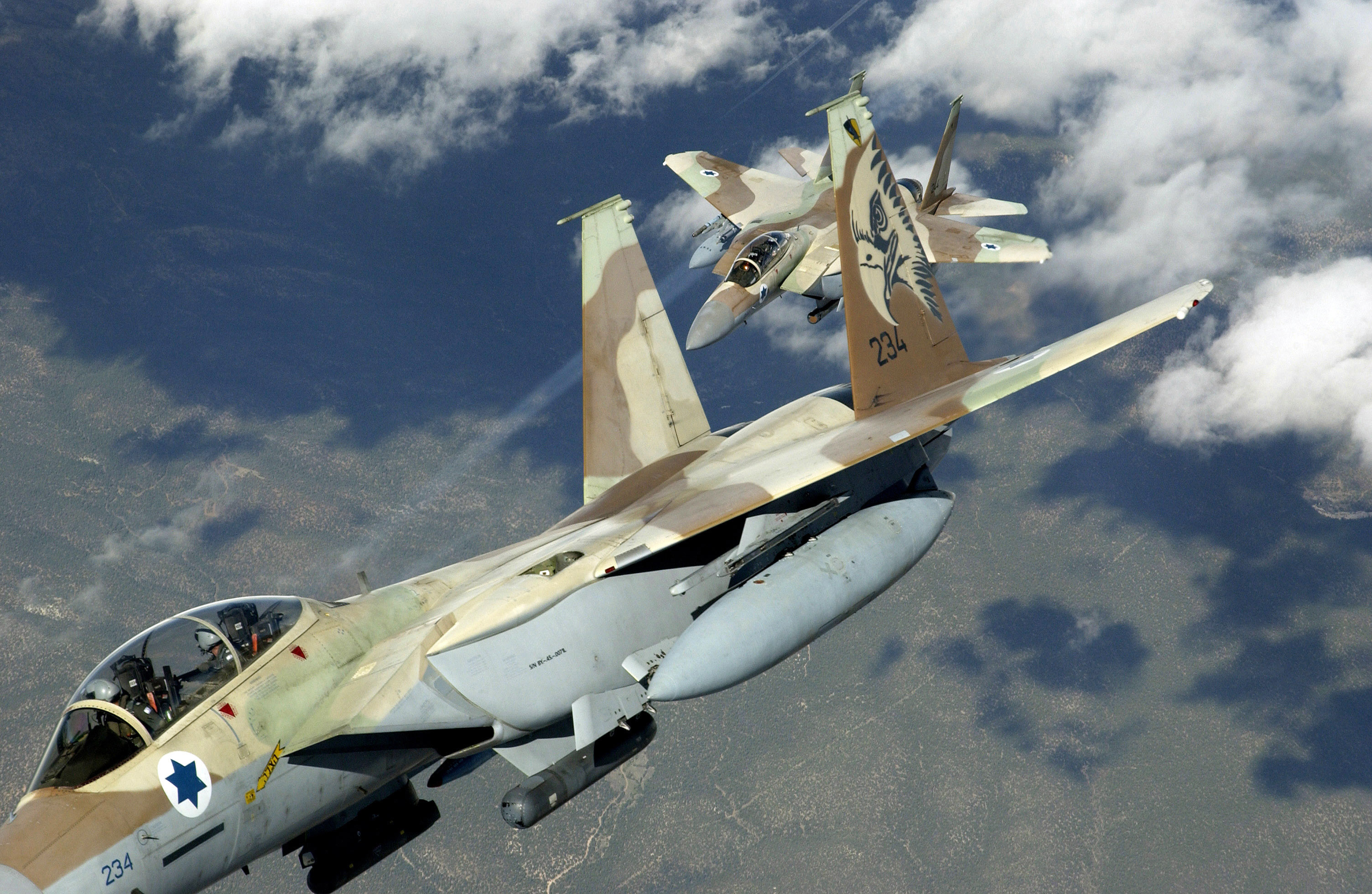
Two Israeli Air Force F-15 Ra'ams practicing air defense maneuvers at Red Flag 2004

A key element of Red Flag operations is the Red Flag Measurement and Debriefing System (RFMDS). RFMDS is a computer hardware and software network that provides real-time monitoring, post-mission reconstruction of maneuvers and tactics, participant pairings, and integration of range targets and simulated threats. Blue Force commanders objectively assess mission effectiveness and validate lessons learned from data provided by the RFMDS.

A typical flag exercise year includes ten Green Flags (a close air support (CAS) exercise with the U.S. Army), one Canadian Maple Flag (operated by the Royal Canadian Air Force) and four Red Flags. Each Red Flag exercise normally involves a variety of fighter interdiction, attack/strike, air superiority, enemy air defense suppression, airlift, air refueling and reconnaissance missions. In a 12-month period, more than 500 aircraft fly more than 20,000 sorties, while training more than 5,000 aircrews and 14,000 support and maintenance personnel.

Before a "flag" begins, the Red Flag staff conducts a planning conference where unit representatives and planning staff members develop the size and scope of their participation. All aspects of the exercise, including billeting of personnel, transportation to Nellis AFB, range coordination, ordnance/munitions scheduling, and development of training scenarios, are designed to be as realistic as possible, fully exercising each participating unit's capabilities and objectives.

== Origin ==
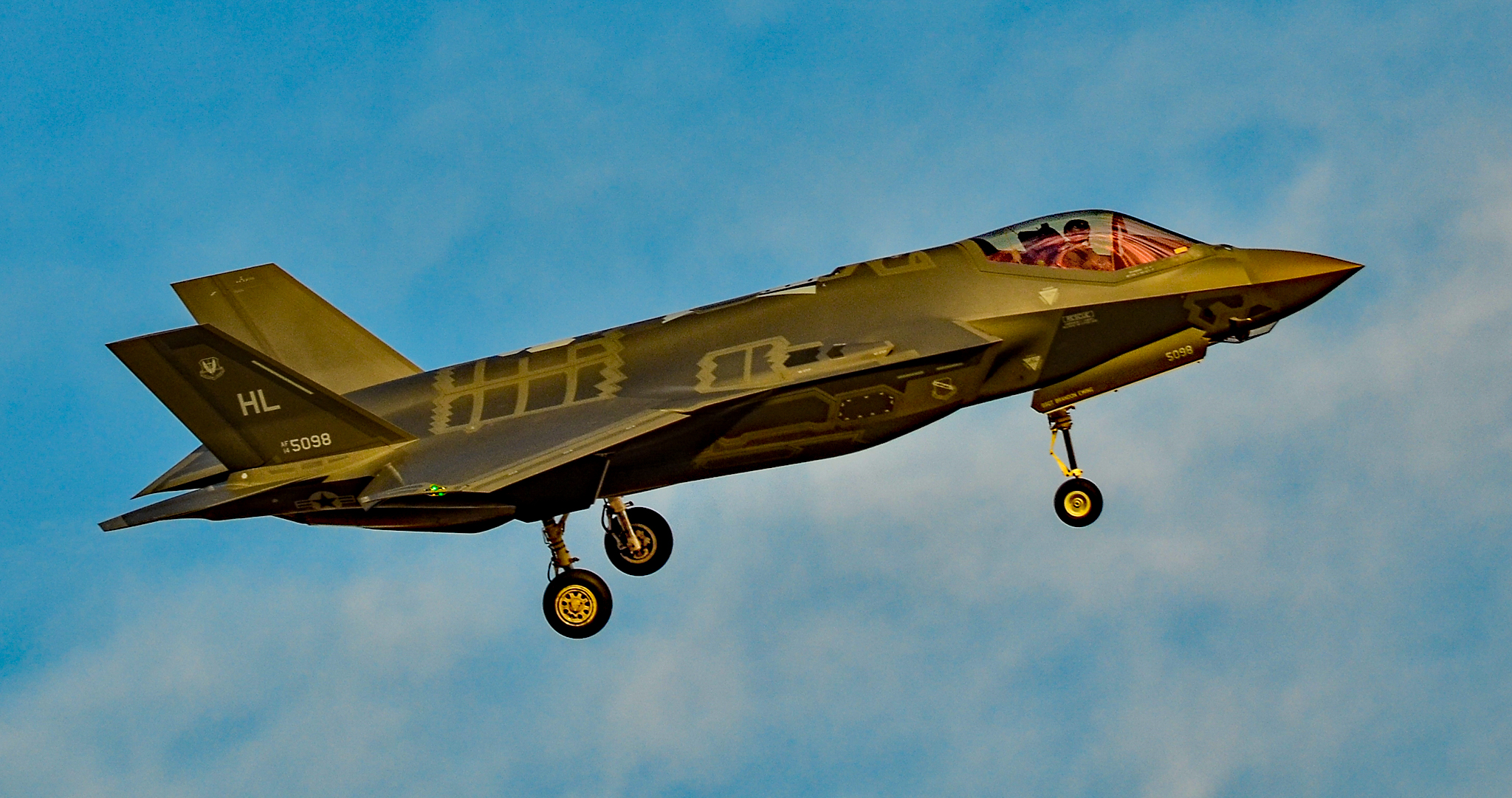
The United States Air Force F-35A made its debut at Red Flag 17-1

The origin of Red Flag was the unacceptable performance of USAF fighter pilots and weapon systems officers (WSO) in air-to-air combat ("air combat maneuvering," ACM) during the Vietnam War in comparison to previous wars. Air combat over North Vietnam between 1965 and 1973 led to an overall exchange ratio (ratio of enemy aircraft shot down to the number of own aircraft lost to enemy fighters) of 2.2:1 (for a while in June and July 1972 during Operation Linebacker the ratio was less than 1:1).

Among the several factors resulting in this disparity was a lack of realistic ACM training. USAF pilots and WSOs of the late 1950s, 1960s, and early 1970s were not versed in the core values and basics of ACM due to the belief that beyond-visual-range missile (BVR) engagements and equipment made "close-in" maneuvering in air combat obsolete. As a result of this BVR-only mindset reaching its zenith in the early 1960s, nearly all USAF fighter pilots and WSOs of the period were unpracticed in maneuvering against dissimilar aircraft because of a concurrent Air Force emphasis on flying safety. This led to U.S. aircrews' susceptibility to ACM as well as surface-to-air missiles (SAM).

An Air Force analysis known as Project Red Baron II showed that a pilot's chances of survival in combat dramatically increased after he had completed ten combat missions. As a result, Red Flag was created in 1975 to offer USAF pilots and weapon systems officers the opportunity to fly ten realistically simulated combat missions in a safe training environment with measurable results.

Colonel Richard "Moody" Suter, who was well liked at Nellis Air Force Base, became the driving force in Red Flag's implementation, persuading the Tactical Air Command (TAC) commander, General Robert J. Dixon, to adopt the program. General Dixon approved the idea in May 1975 and ordered the exercise established within six months. The first Red Flag exercise was conducted in compliance with General Dixon's schedule on 29 November 1975 and included 37 aircraft, supported by 561 personnel, flying some 552 sorties.

On 1 March 1976, the 4440th Tactical Fighter Training Group (Red Flag) was chartered with Col P.J. White as the first commander, Lt Col Marty Mahrt, as vice commander Lt Col David Burney as Director of Operations. This small crew under Col White's leadership undertook the task of firmly establishing the program.

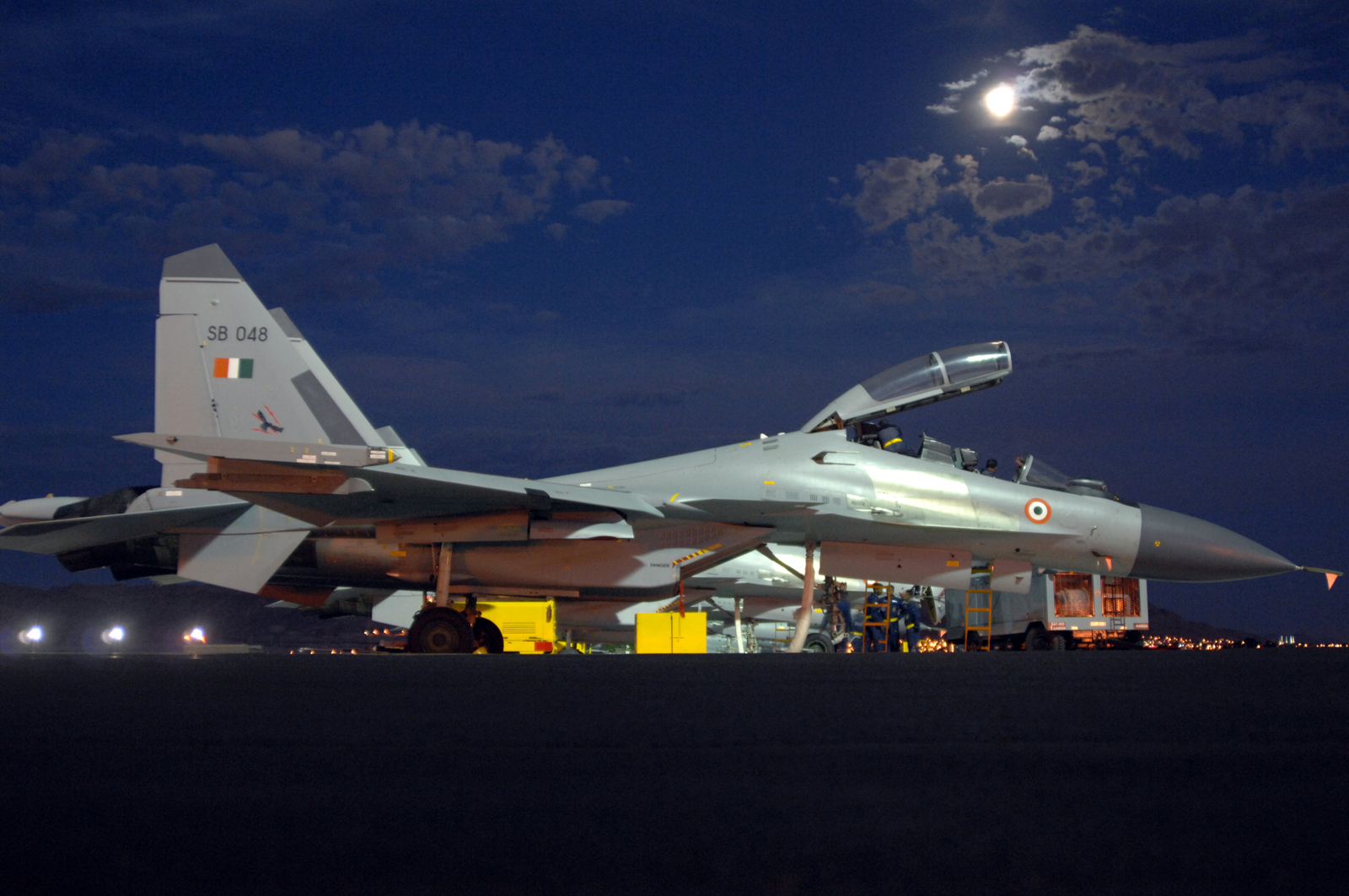
An Indian Air Force Sukhoi Su-30MKI undergoes post-flight maintenance during the Red Flag exercise in 2008.

The "aggressor squadrons", the opponents who flew against the pilots undergoing training, were selected from the top fighter pilots in the U.S. Air Force. These pilots were trained to operate according to the tactical doctrines of the Soviet Union and other enemies of the period, to better simulate what then-TAC, as well as USAFE, PACAF and other NATO pilots and WSOs would likely encounter in real combat against a Warsaw Pact or other Soviet-proxy adversary. The aggressors were initially equipped with readily available T-38 Talon aircraft to simulate the Mikoyan MiG-21, the T-38 being similar in terms of size and performance. F-5 Tiger II fighters, painted in color schemes commonly found on Soviet aircraft, were added shortly after that and became the mainstay until the F-16 Fighting Falcon was introduced.

Today, the 414th Combat Training Squadron (414 CTS) is the unit currently tasked with running Red Flag exercises, while the 64th Aggressor Squadron (64 AGRS) also based at Nellis AFB uses F-16 aircraft to emulate the MiG-29 Fulcrum. These aircraft continue to be painted in the various camouflage schemes of potential adversaries. An additional squadron at Nellis, the 65th Aggressor Squadron (65 AGRS), operated F-15 Eagle fighter aircraft in various camouflage schemes of potential adversaries to replicate Su-27 Flanker and Su-35 Flanker threats. However, the 65 AGRS was inactivated on 26 September 2014 due to the Fiscal Year 2015 budget constraints imposed upon the Air Force that zero-lined the squadron's budget.

Time-lapse of the ramp at Nellis AFB during Red Flag 21–1 in February 2021

The U.S. Navy operates a similar large-force training exercise known as Air Wing Fallon at NAS Fallon and the Fallon Range Training Complex in northern Nevada. Air Wing Fallon is a month-long evolution designed to enhance a carrier air wing's war-fighting ability in both the air-to-air and air-to-ground arenas, with the primary focus being for the air wing to become familiar with the complexity of a massive force strike (LFS). Previously under the aegis of "Strike University" (STRIKE U), an O-6 level command when it was formed in 1984, Strike U was later merged with the fighter community's TOPGUN and the carrier airborne early warning community's TOP DOME following those organization's 1993 BRAC-directed relocation from the former NAS Miramar, California, forming the Naval Strike and Air Warfare Center (NSAWC) under the command of naval aviation flag officer at NAS Fallon in July 1996. NSAWC then became the executive agent for Air Wing Fallon.

In the 2010s, NSAWC incorporated the electronic attack community's HAVOC directorate, and in 2016, NSAWC was re-designated as the Naval Aviation Warfighting Development Center (NAWDC). The Commander of NAWDC at NAS Fallon, the Commander of the USAFWC at Nellis AFB, and their respective subordinate units and staffs maintain natural rapport with each other in areas of shared equities and the tactical development of the Joint Force.

Red Flag and Air Wing Fallon should not be confused with smaller, but longer duration, programs that the USAF and USN run to train individual weapons and tactics instructors. In 2009, the 416th Flight Test Squadron from Edwards AFB, California, participated in Red Flag as well, the first time an Air Force Materiel Command (AFMC) unit had been part of the program.

Red Flag 22–3, hosted in July 2022, marked a near tripling of the usual exercise area, with the 414th Combat Training Squadron and the Federal Aviation Administration having worked out a network of airspace corridors connecting the Nevada Test and Training Range with the Utah Test and Training Range and the R-2508 Special Use Airspace Complex around Edwards Air Force Base, California. This arrangement brought the total airspace area for Red Flag 22–3 to 36,000 square miles (93,000 km^{2}), an adjustment needed for the training with fifth-generation fighter aircraft, which use longer-range maneuvers than previous fighters.

== Participating countries ==
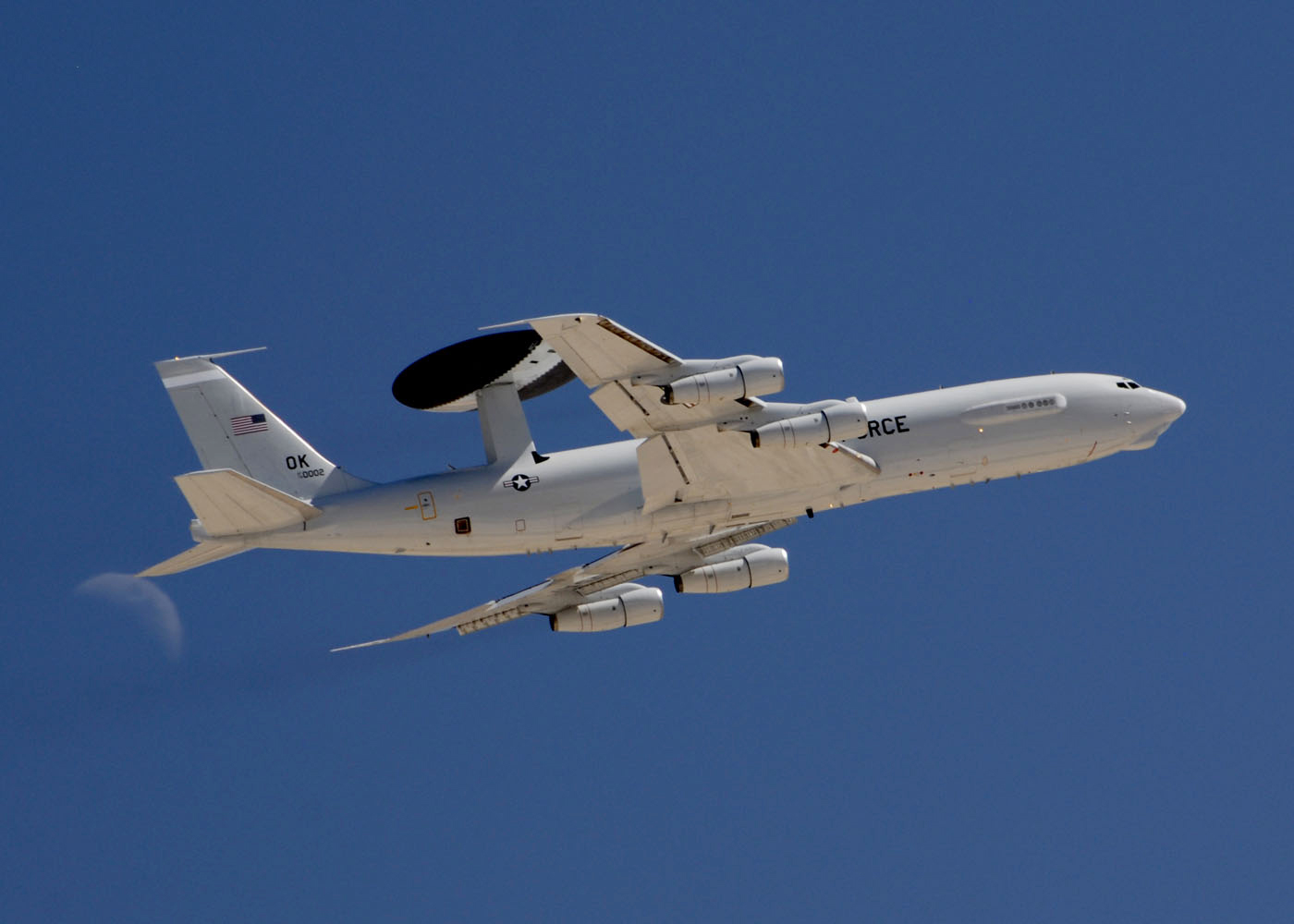
A USAF E-3 Sentry AWACS used to control the large number of aircraft during Red Flag exercises

Only countries considered friendly towards the United States take part in Red Flag exercises. So far, the countries to have participated in these exercises are:

- Australia (1980, 1982, 1984, September 2002, June 2006, February 2007, February 2016, February 2018, February 2022, January 2023, January 2024)
- Belgium (October 2006, February 2011, 2014, March 2019)
- Brazil (August 1998, July 2008)
- Canada (1977, 1979, 1981, 1983, 1984, 1989, September 2002, August 2006)
- Chile (July 1998)
- Colombia (September 2002, July 2012, February 2018, March 2019)
- Denmark (November 2007, 2014)
- Finland (2018)
- France (August 2006, August 2008)
- Germany (November 1999, March 2001, August 2006, August 2007, March 2020)
- Greece (October 2008)
- India (August 2008, 2016 May 2024)
- Israel (September 2002, August 2004, 2009, August 2015, August 2016, March 2023)
- Italy (October 1989, October 1992, September 2002, March 2016, March 2019 (Note: In 2019, the Italian Air Force did not participate with aircraft of their own, but sent three instructor pilots who participated as part of the United States Air Force's 62nd Fighter Squadron.))
- Jordan (August 2015)
- NATO (Note: NATO is not a country, but its E-3A component does not belong to any of the participating air forces and is directly subordinate to NATO.) (July 2008, July 2010, March 2014, March 2015, August 2017, March 2020, August 2021)
- Netherlands (November 2007, January 2013, March 2019)
- Norway (November 2007, 2021)
- Pakistan (2010, 2016)
- Portugal (2000)
- Sweden (July 2008, January 2013, March 2022)
- Singapore (August 2006, January 2013, August 2015, March 2019)
- Saudi Arabia (March 2019, March 2022)
- South Korea (August 2008)
- Spain (1994, 2007, 2008, August 2016, 2017, 2018, March 2020)
- Turkey (1997, February 2000, July 2008, March 2016)
- United Arab Emirates (July 2012, January 2013, 2014, March 2019)
- United Kingdom (1977–1983, February 2000, June 2006, February 2007, January 2017, February 2018, January 2020, January 2022, January 2023, January 2024)
- Venezuela (1992)

== Incidents ==
- On 5 July 1979, Major Gary Mekash and Lieutenant Colonel Eugene Soeder died in the crash of U.S. Air Force F-111A Aardvark, serial number 67-0105, of the 430th Tactical Fighter Squadron.
- On 7 February 1980, a Royal Air Force (RAF) Blackburn Buccaneer S.2B, RAF Serial XV345 of No. XV Squadron crashed after suffering a failure of the main spar, resulting in the deaths of Sqn Ldr Ken Tait and Flt Lt Charles "Rusty" Ruston. Buccaneers were grounded following the accident
- On 23 March 2001, a German Air Force Panavia Tornado IDS of Jagdbombergeschwader 34 crashed 160 kilometres (99 mi) northwest of Nellis Air Force Base during a low-level attack at night, which was being flown as part of Red Flag. Major Bernd Lothar Koch and Hauptmann Michael Bieler, both of Jagdbombergeschwader 33, were killed in the crash.

== Notable appearances in media ==
Red Flag was depicted in a 1981 made-for-TV movie, Red Flag: The Ultimate Game. Red Flag is also featured in a 2004 IMAX film, Fighter Pilot: Operation Red Flag.

== See also ==
- Anatolian Eagle Exercise at Konya, Turkey
- Red Flag – Alaska – Exercise-based out of Eielson Air Force Base, Alaska (formerly Cope Thunder)
- Blue Flag (Israeli Air Force exercise) – Exercise in southern Israel that takes place every two years.
- Maple Flag
- Space Flag – Training exercise hosted by the US Space Force
- United States Navy Strike Fighter Tactics Instructor program - "Topgun"
- Opposing force
- Exercise Frisian Flag is an annual exercise at Leeuwarden Air Base, the Netherlands.
