= United States Navy Strike Fighter Tactics Instructor program =

U.S. naval aviation school

United States Navy Fighter Weapons School
- Founded: 1969
- Country: United States
- Branch: United States Navy
- Role: Aerial Warfare
- Part of: Naval Aviation Warfighting Development Center (NAWDC)
- Headquarters: NAS Fallon, Nevada, U.S.
- Nickname: "Top Gun"
- Anniversaries: Activated March 3, 1969

Commanders
- Notable commanders: CAPT Dan Pedersen David Frost; Roger E. Box; Ronald E. McKeown; Dan Dixon; Richard Butler; Blaine S. Felloney; Timothy Myers; Kevin McLaughlin

The United States Navy Strike Fighter Tactics Instructor program (SFTI program), more popularly known as Top Gun (stylized as TOPGUN), is a United States Navy training program that teaches air combat maneuvering tactics and techniques to selected naval aviators and naval flight officers, who return to their operating units as surrogate instructors.

The program began as the United States Navy Fighter Weapons School, established on 3 March 1969, at the former Naval Air Station Miramar in San Diego, California. In 1996, the school was merged into the Naval Strike and Air Warfare Center at Naval Air Station Fallon, Nevada.

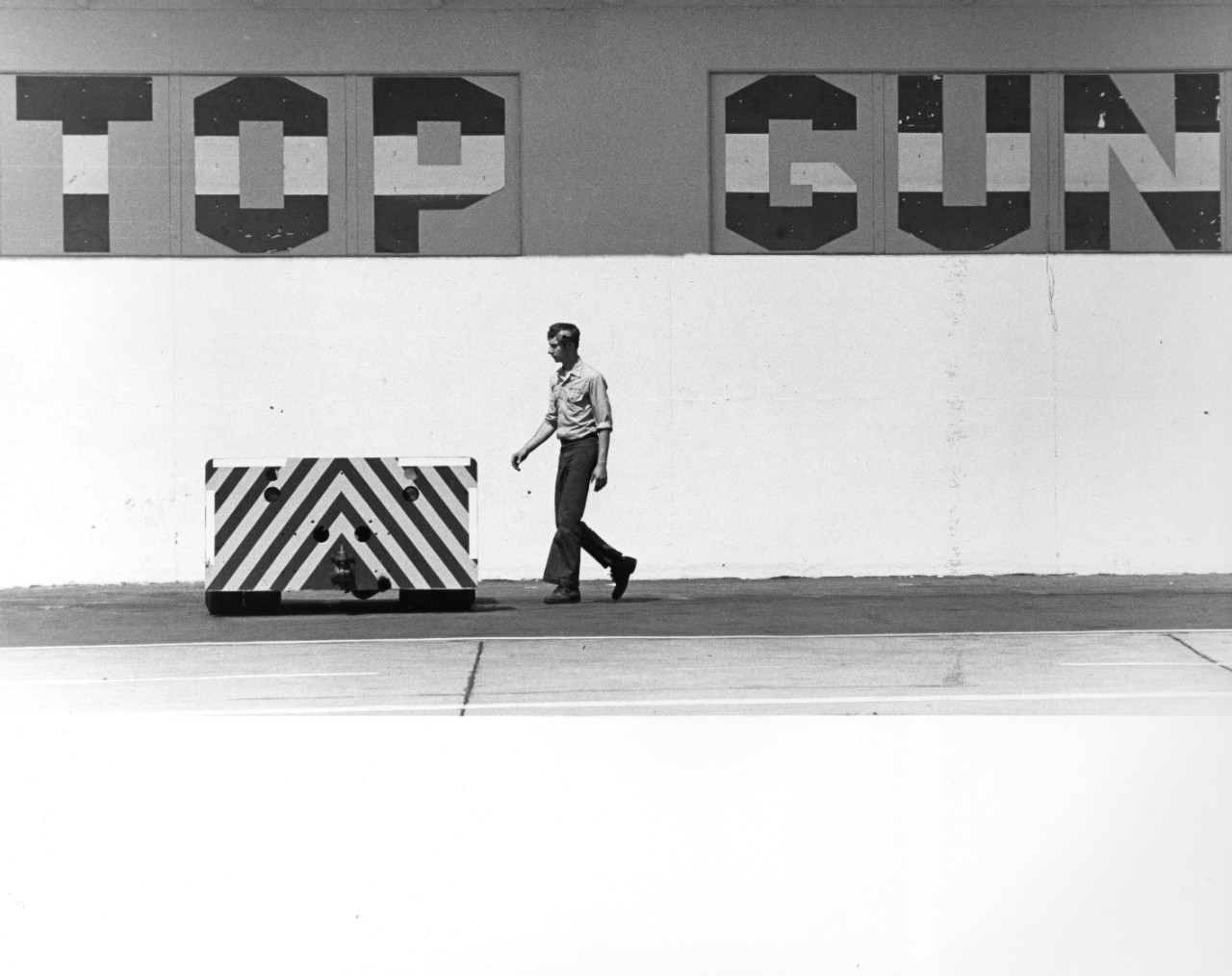
"TOP GUN" text at the line shack of NAS Miramar, 1984

== History ==
=== Origins ===
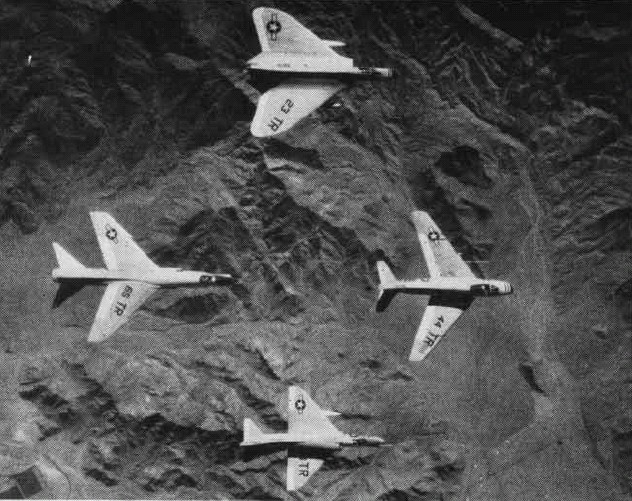
U.S. Navy Fleet Air Gunnery Unit Pacific aircraft from NAAS El Centro in the late 1950s

An earlier U.S. Navy air-to-air combat training program, the U.S. Navy Fleet Air Gunnery Units, or FAGU, had provided air combat training for Naval Aviators from the early 1950s until 1960. In June 1956, Fleet Air Gunnery Unit Pacific held the Navy Fleet Air Gunnery Meet at NAAS El Centro. In April 1957, Naval Air Weapons Meet 1957 was held at NAAS El Centro. In April 1958, Naval Air Weapons Meet was held at NAAS El Centro. From 30 November to 4 December 1959, the last Naval Air Weapons Meet was held at MCAAS Yuma. Signage called it "Top Gun". 'Fleet Air Gunnery Unit Pacific' and 'Marine Training Groups' were closed, as an economy, and a doctrinal shift, brought on by advances in missile, radar, and fire control technology, contributing to the belief that the era of the classic dogfight was over, leading to their disestablishment and a serious decline in U.S. air-to-air combat proficiency that became apparent during the Vietnam War. The pilots who were part of the initial cadre of instructors at Top Gun had experience as students from FAGU.

In 1968, Chief of Naval Operations (CNO) Admiral Thomas Hinman Moorer ordered Captain Frank Ault to research the failings of the U.S. air-to-air missiles used against the Vietnam People's Air Force during the then-ongoing Vietnam War. Operation Rolling Thunder, which lasted from 2 March 1965 to 1 November 1968, ultimately saw almost 1,000 U.S. aircraft losses in about one million sorties.

Royal Navy and South African Brigadier General Dick Lord along with others were sent to assist the US Military. He wrote the USN Air Combat Maneuvering Manual (ACM) and his training methods were instrumental in the creation of TOPGUN.

=== Fighter Weapons School ===
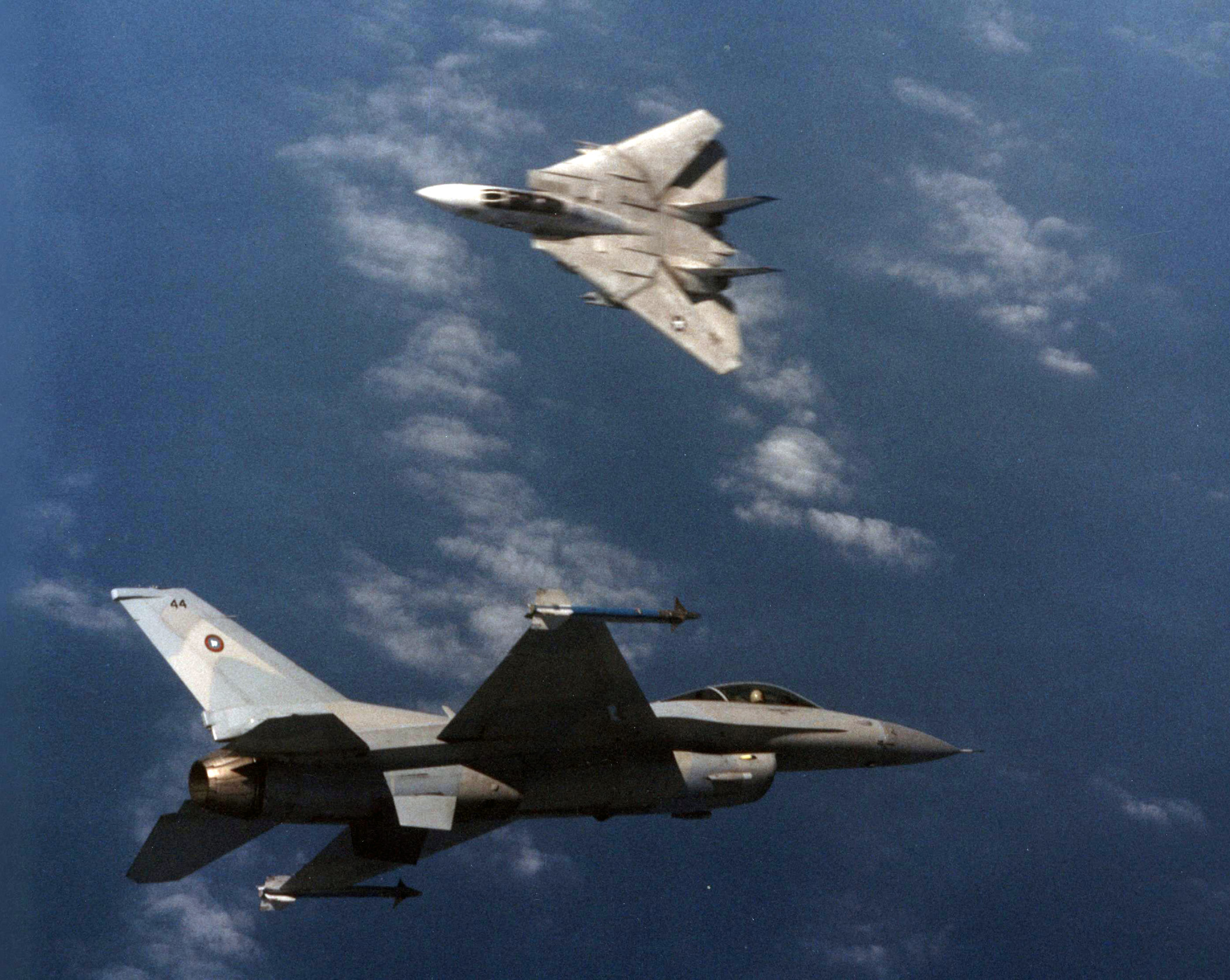
An F-16 Fighting Falcon and an F-14 Tomcat engaged in a mock dogfight as part of Top Gun training in 1989

The United States Navy Fighter Weapons School was established on 3 March 1969, at Naval Air Station Miramar, California. Placed under the control of the VF-121 "Pacemakers," an F-4 Phantom–equipped Replacement Air Group (RAG) unit, the new school received relatively scant funding and resources. Its staff consisted of eight F-4 Phantom II instructors from VF-121 and one intelligence officer hand-picked by the school's first officer-in-charge, Lieutenant Commander Dan Pedersen, USN. Together, F-4 aviators Darrell Gary, Mel Holmes, Jim Laing, John Nash, Jim Ruliffson, Jerry Sawatzky, J. C. Smith, Steve Smith, as well as Wayne Hildebrand, a naval intelligence officer, built the Naval Fighter Weapons School syllabus from scratch. To support their operations, they borrowed aircraft from its parent unit and other Miramar-based units, such as composite squadron VC-7 and Fighter Squadron VF-126. The school's first headquarters at Miramar was in a stolen modular trailer.

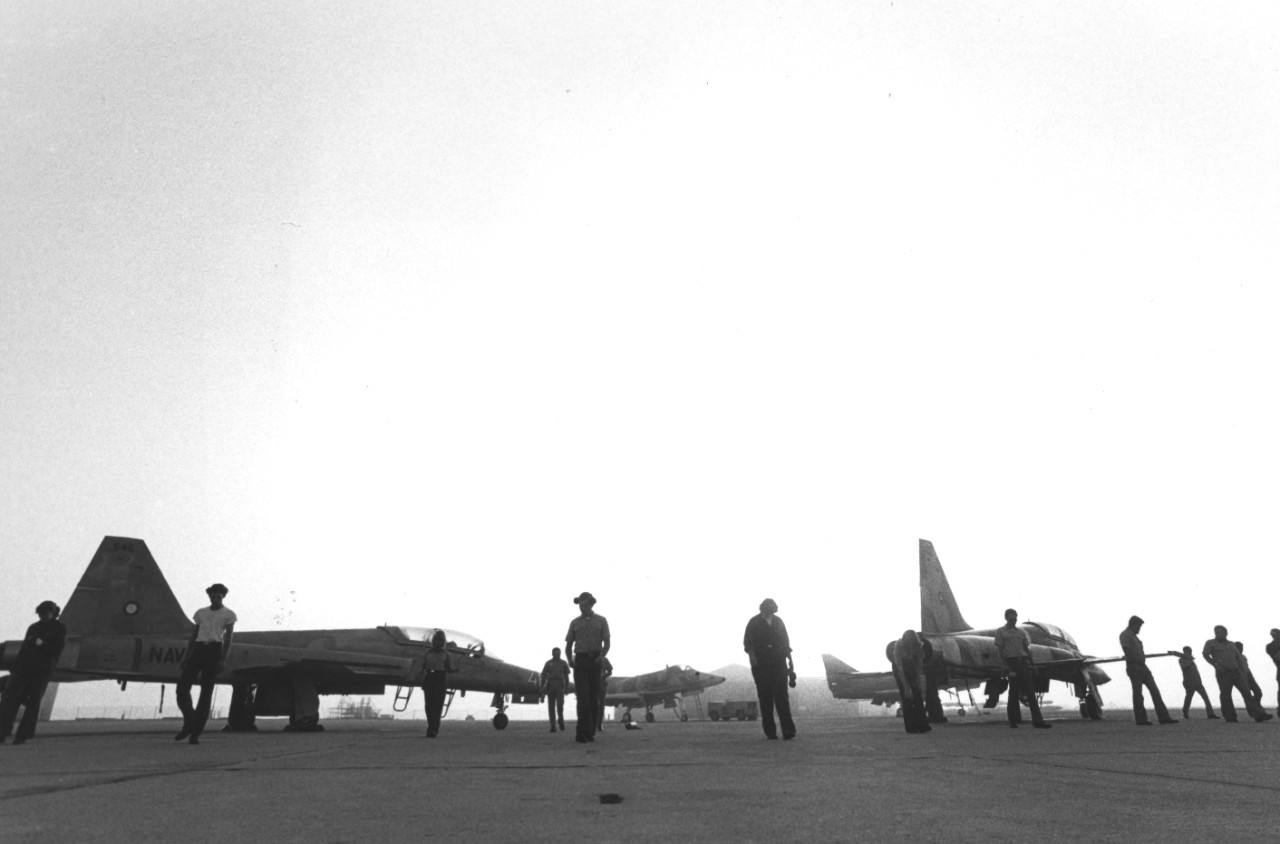
Mechanics at the flight line of NAS Miramar, 1984

According to the 1973 command history of the Navy Fighter Weapons School, the unit's purpose was to "train fighter air crews at the graduate level in all aspects of fighter weapons systems including tactics, techniques, procedures and doctrine. It serves to build a nucleus of eminently knowledgeable fighter crews to construct, guide, and enhance weapons training cycles and subsequent aircrew performance. This select group acts as the F-4 community's most operationally orientated weapons specialists. Top Gun's efforts are dedicated to the Navy's professional fighter crews, past, present and future."

Highly qualified instructors were an essential element of Top Gun's success. Mediocre instructors are unable to hold the attention of talented students. Top Gun instructors were knowledgeable fighter tacticians assigned to one or more specific fields of expertise, such as a particular weapon, threat, or tactic. Every instructor was required to become an expert in effective training techniques. All lectures were given without notes after being screened by a notorious "murder board" of evaluators who would point out ambiguities or flawed concepts in the draft presentation. The curriculum was in a constant state of flux based upon class critiques and integration of developing tactics to use new systems to combat emerging threats. Instructors often spent their first year on the staff learning to be an effective part of the training environment.

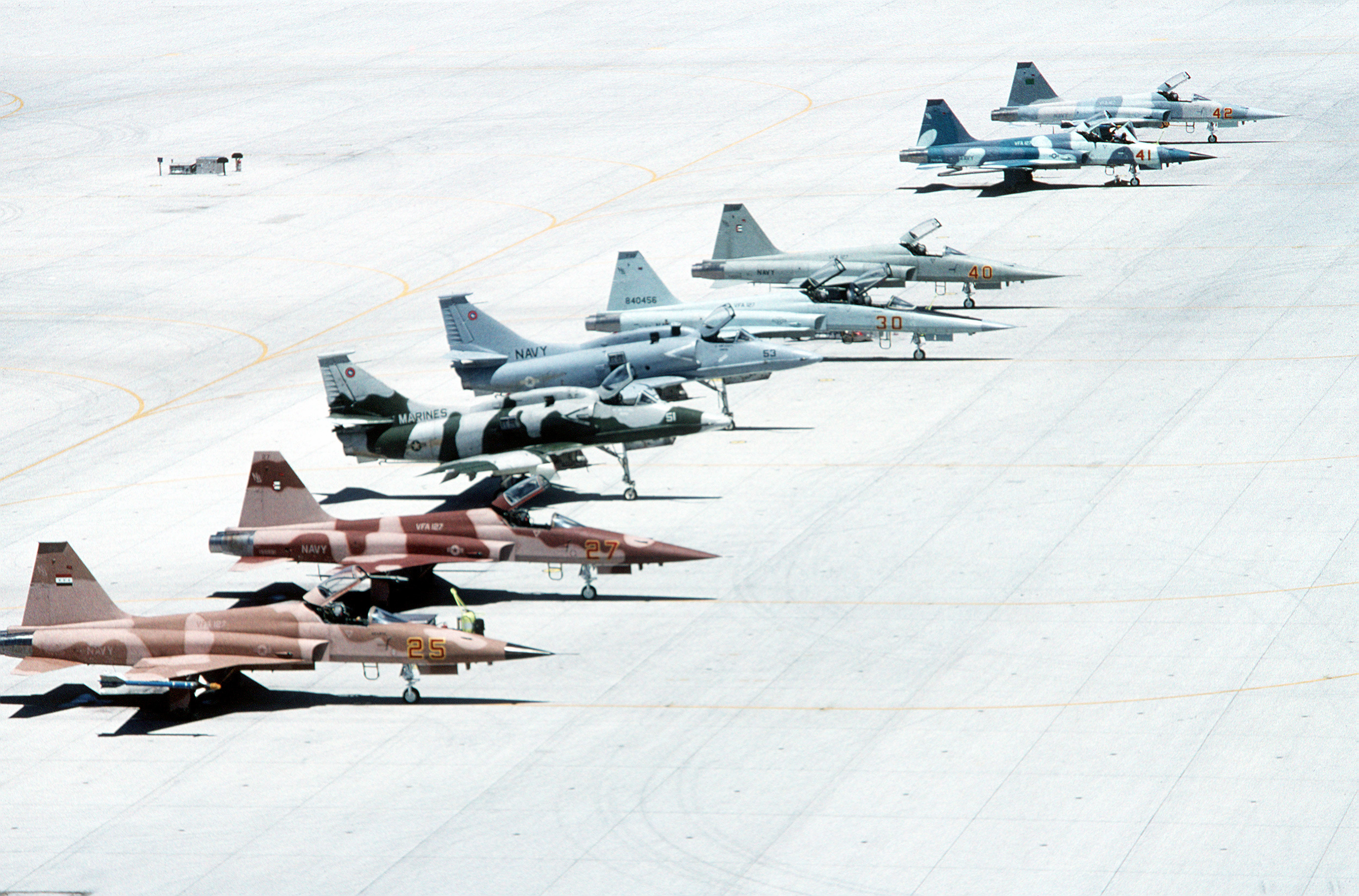
Top Gun F-5E and F-5F Tiger II fighters alongside A-4M Skyhawk attackers, all painted in aggressor markings, at NAS Fallon in 1993

Top Gun initially operated the Douglas A-4 Skyhawk and borrowed USAF Northrop T-38 Talons to simulate the flying characteristics of the MiG-17 and MiG-21, respectively. The school also used Marine-crewed Grumman A-6 Intruders and USAF Convair F-106 Delta Dart aircraft when available. Later adversary aircraft included the IAI Kfir and General Dynamics F-16 Fighting Falcon; and the T-38 was replaced by the Northrop F-5E and F-5F Tiger II.

In addition to maneuvering skill, knowledge of weapons systems was recognized as important. Weapons system knowledge was determined as a common thread among the 4 percent of World War II pilots who accounted for 40 percent of the enemy aircraft destroyed. The complexity of modern weapons systems requires careful study to achieve design potential.

The British writer Rowland White claimed that the early school was influenced by a group of a dozen flying instructors from the British Royal Navy's Fleet Air Arm, who were assigned to Miramar as exchange pilots and served as instructors in VF-121. A British newspaper, The Daily Telegraph, declared in a 2009 headline, "American Top Gun Fighter Pilot Academy Set Up by British." However, the British naval pilots mentioned in the article confirmed that the claim was false and that they had no role in creating the curriculum and no access to the classified programs that the Top Gun instructors participated in to refine it.

During the halt in the bombing campaign against North Vietnam (in force from 1968 until the early 1970s), Top Gun established itself as a center of excellence in fighter doctrine, tactics, and training. By the time aerial activity over the North resumed, most Navy squadrons had a Top Gun graduate. According to the Navy, the results were dramatic: the Navy kill-to-loss ratio against the North Vietnamese Air Force (NVAF) MiGs soared from 2.42:1 to 12.5:1. In contrast, the Air Force, which had not implemented a similar training program, saw its kill ratio worsen for a time after the resumption of bombing, according to Benjamin Lambeth's The Transformation of American Airpower. On 28 March 1970, Lieutenant Jerry Beaulier, a graduate of Top Gun's first class, scored the first kill of a North Vietnamese MiG since September 1968.

=== Transfer to NSAWC ===
In 1996, the transfer of NAS Miramar to the U.S. Marine Corps was coupled with the incorporation of Top Gun into the Naval Strike and Air Warfare Center (NSAWC) at NAS Fallon, Nevada. In 2016, NSAWC was rebranded as the Naval Aviation Warfighting Development Center (NAWDC), where Top Gun remains a department alongside graduate-level weapons schools for other naval aviation platforms.

In 2011, the Top Gun program was inducted into the International Air & Space Hall of Fame at the San Diego Air & Space Museum.

== In popular culture ==
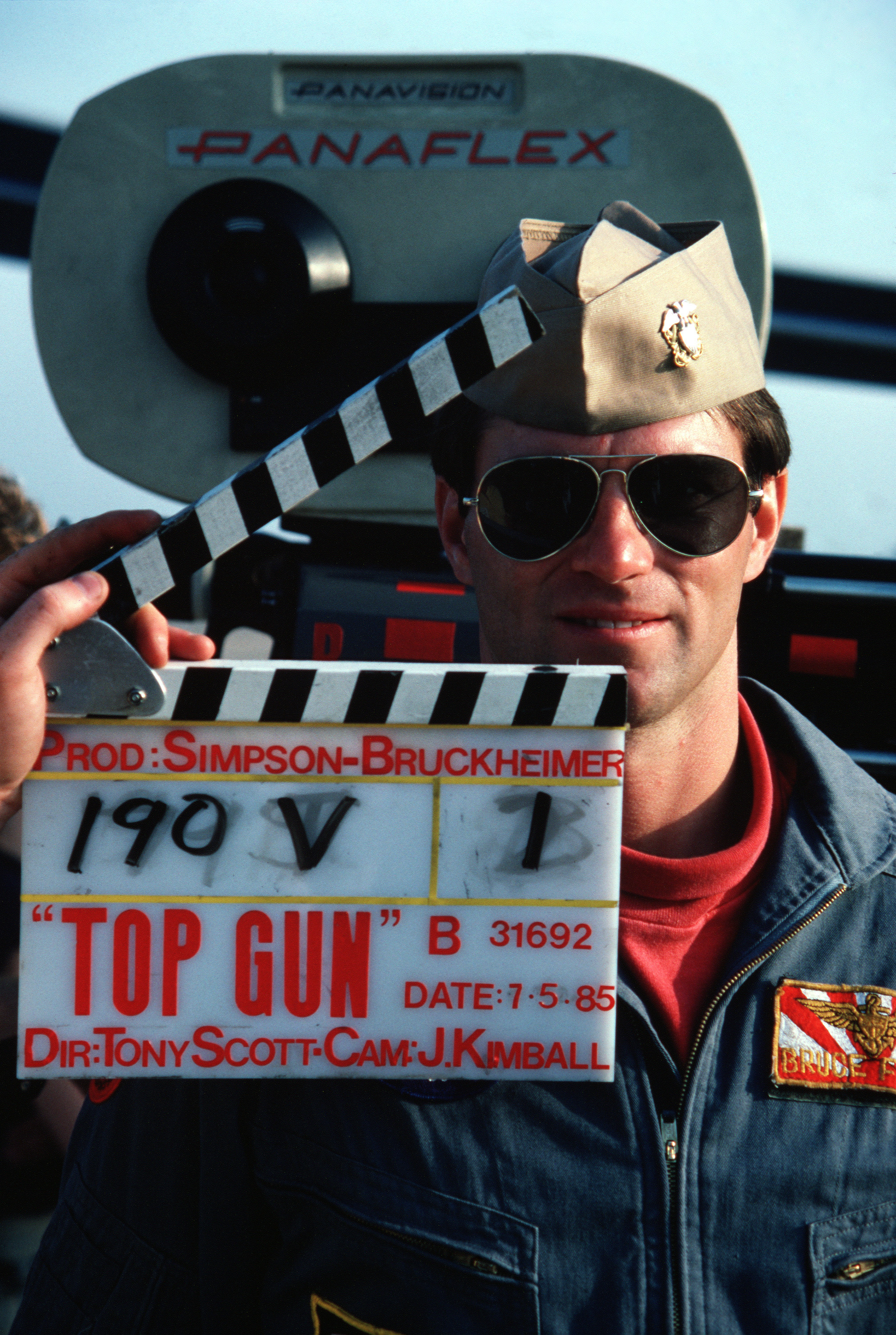
A U.S. naval aviator acting as a stand-in during Top Gun filming at NAS Miramar, 5 July 1985

The school was made famous by the 1986 film Top Gun, starring Tom Cruise. Quoting Top Gun while at the school incurs an immediate $5 fine, as it is seen as conflicting with the institute's atmosphere of professionalism.

The 2022 sequel Top Gun: Maverick was also set at Top Gun, although in the film the school is based at Naval Air Station North Island in San Diego and not Nevada.

== See also ==
- United States Air Force Weapons School
- Carrier Airborne Early Warning Weapons School (CAEWWS)
- Combat Commanders' School (Pakistan)
- Exercise Red Flag
- Naval Strike and Air Warfare Center (USN)
- Qualified Weapons Instructor (United Kingdom)
- Tactics and Air Combat Defence Establishment (India)
- Military–entertainment complex
