= Naval Aviation Warfighting Development Center =

U.S. Navy facility for development of naval aviation training and tactics

Coordinates: 39.420575°N 118.712942°W

The Naval Aviation Warfighting Development Center (NAWDC), formerly known as Naval Strike and Air Warfare Center (NSAWC) is the center of excellence for naval aviation training and tactics development, located at Naval Air Station Fallon in Fallon, Nevada. NAWDC provides service to aircrews, squadrons and air wings of the United States Navy through flight training, academic instructional classes, and direct operational and intelligence support.

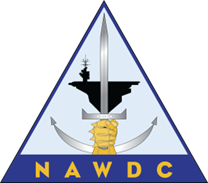
NAWDC logo

The name was changed from NSAWC to NAWDC in June 2015 to align with the naming convention of the Navy's other Warfighting Development Centers, including Naval Surface and Mine Warfighting Development Center (SMWDC), Naval Information Warfighting Development Center (NIWDC), and the Undersea Warfighting Development Center (UWDC).

== History ==
NSAWC (now NAWDC) consolidated three commands into a single command structure under a flag officer on 11 July 1996 to enhance aviation training effectiveness. The Naval Strike Warfare Center (informal STRIKE "U" – for Strike University), based at NAS Fallon since 1984, was amalgamated with the Navy Fighter Weapons School ("TOPGUN") and the Carrier Airborne Early Warning Weapons School (CAEWWS) (historically known as “TOPDOME”). Both schools had moved from NAS Miramar as a result of a Base Realignment and Closure decision in 1993 which transferred that installation back to the Marine Corps as MCAS Miramar. The Seahawk Weapon School was added in 1998 to provide tactical training for Navy SH-60 / HH-60 / MH-60 series helicopters. The Airborne Electronic Attack Weapons School (HAVOC) for the EA-18G aircraft was added in 2011, augmenting the legacy Electronic Attack Weapons School (EAWS) for the EA-6B and EA-18G at NAS Whidbey Island, WA. In 2020, the first pilots completed the course in the F-35C Lightning II aircraft. In July 2020, NAWDC received its first F-35 aircraft, allowing it to replicate 5th generation threats in its training.

== Mission ==
NAWDC is the primary authority on training and tactics development. NAWDC provides training, assessment, aviation requirements recommendations, research and development priorities for integrated strike warfare, maritime and overland air superiority, strike fighter employment, airborne battle management, Combat Search and Rescue (CSAR), Close Air Support (CAS), and associated planning support systems. The command is also responsible for the development, implementation, and administration of several courses of instruction while functioning as the Navy point of contact for all issues relating to the Air Combat Training Continuum. Additionally, NAWDC is the Navy point of contact for all issues related to the Fallon Range Training Complex (FRTC).

== Command structure ==
NAWDC consists of ten departments. Personnel Resources (N1) oversees administrative functions, supply, security, automated information systems, and first lieutenant. The Intelligence Department (N2) provides support to air wing training in Fallon as well as to fleets and battle groups based around the world. Additionally, N2 contains the CIS (Computer Information Systems) division. Operations (N3) manages scheduling for aircraft, aircrew and the training ranges, and keeps aircrew log books and records. The Maintenance Department (N4) maintains all NAWDC aircraft, including parts and supplies, manages the loading, unloading and storage of ordnance, and maintains aircrew flight equipment.

Strike (N5) is involved in tactics development and assessment for tactical aircraft and H-60 helicopters, program management and participation, mission planning, and inter/intra service liaison. N5 is the legacy "Strike U" organization and its primary function is the execution of Air Wing Fallon.

The C2 (Command and Control) Department (N6), known as the Carrier Airborne Early Warning Weapons School (CAEWWS), provides graduate-level command, control, communication, battle management, and training to E-2 Hawkeye aircrew, joint and combined personnel. CAEWWS is responsible for the development of community TTP, community tactical standardization and the production of Hawkeye WTIs. In addition to the course of instruction N6 Department conducts, N6 instructors support the N5 Department as Command and Control instructors and evaluators during Air Wing Fallon Detachment training. N6 Department resides in the Fleet Training Building with the N3, N7, and N8 departments.

The Navy Fighter Weapon School (N7) instructs advanced methods of strike-fighter employment through the "TOPGUN" Strike Fighter Tactics Instructor (SFTI) course. It also conducts the Senior Officers Course (SOC) and manages air wing power projection training. N7 personnel retain the traditional light blue T-shirts and light brown leather nametags worn by TOPGUN personnel. They occupy spaces (shared with N6 and N8) separate from the main NAWDC building, which display TOPGUN's heritage in the form of photos and other memorabilia. The NAWDC F-16, F-35 and F/A-18 aircraft carry the TOPGUN patch on the tail.

The Navy Rotary Wing Weapons School (N8) instructs graduate-level rotary wing employment through the "SEAWOLF" (MH-60S) and "SEA HUNTER" (MH-60R) Seahawk Weapons and Tactics Instructor (SWTI) courses. It also conducts the Strike Leader Attack Training Syllabus (SLATS), Senior Officers Course (SOC), assists N5 with airwing training, manages the Navy's Mountain Flying Course and provides a Search and Rescue (SAR) response capability on the Fallon Range Training Complex (FRTC).

Operational Risk Management/Safety Department (N9) manages air-and-ground related safety programs as well as medical training programs.

The Airborne Electromagnetic Attack Weapons School (N10) is the EA-18G Growler weapons school and conducts the "HAVOC" Growler Tactics Instructor course.

== Training ==
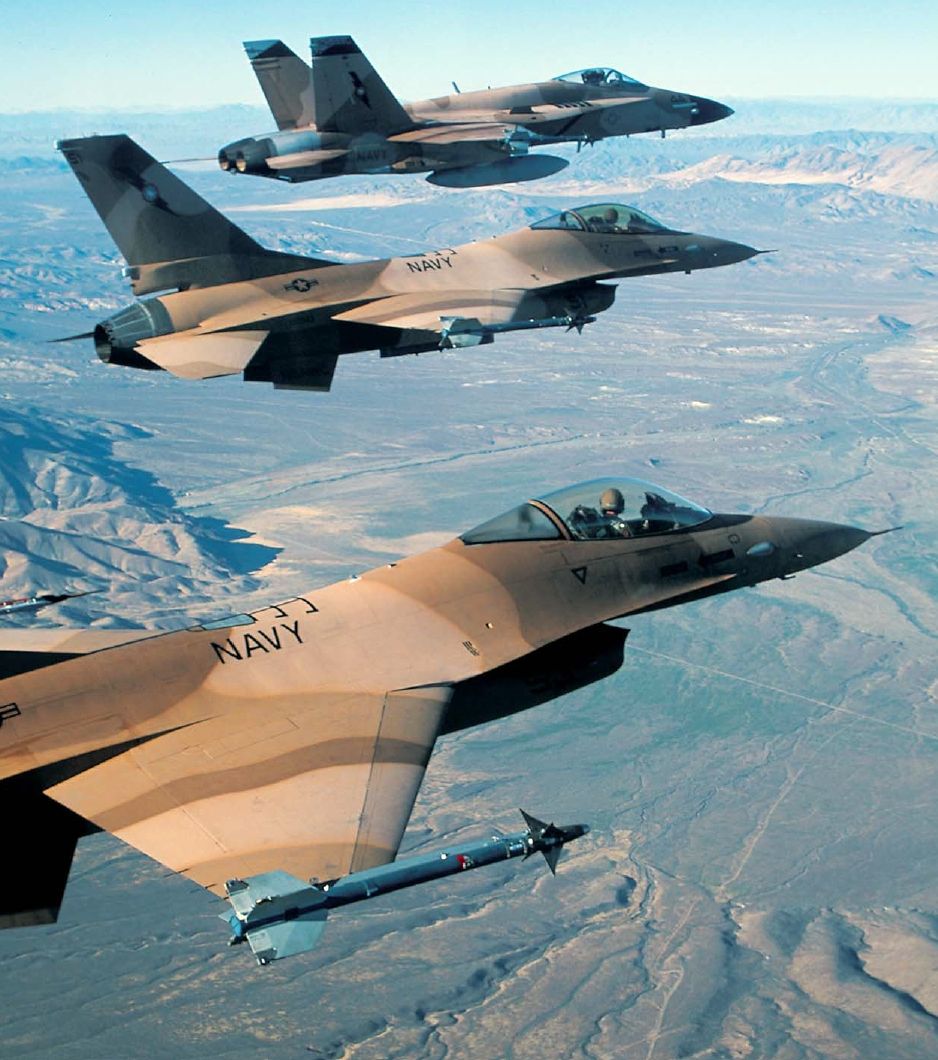
NSAWC F-16As and an F/A-18A over Nevada, in 2005.

There are two distinct areas of NAWDC training using the FRTC extensively – carrier air wing (CVW) training and the "TOPGUN" SFTI, "CAEWWS" HEWTI, "HAVOC" GTI, and "SEAWOLF" & "SEAHUNTER" SWTI graduate level courses. Air wing training brings together all of an air wing's squadrons for four weeks, providing strike planning and execution training opportunities in a realistic, scenario-driven simulated wartime environment.

Air wing training consists of power projection training in strike warfare, amphibious operations, joint battlefield operations, CAS, and CSAR. The Strike Fighter Tactics Instructor (SFTI) course is advanced tactics training for FA-18A-F aircrew in the Navy and Marine Corps through the execution of an air combat syllabus. It produces graduate-level strike fighter tacticians, adversary instructors, and Air Intercept Controllers (AIC). The Growler Tactics Instructor (GTI) course is advanced tactics training for EA-18G aircrew in the Navy through the execution of an air combat and electromagnetic warfare syllabus, and produces graduate-level electromagnetic warfare tacticians. The Seahawk Weapons and Tactics Instructor (SWTI) courses develop the Navy's helicopter tactics doctrine via the SEAWOLF and SEAHUNTER courses; instruct the Navy's Mountain Flying School; provide high-altitude, mountainous flight experience for sea-going squadrons; and provide academic, ground, flight, and opposing-forces instruction for visiting aircrew during Air Wing Fallon detachments. NAWDC staff members augment "adversary" air support, or "bandit" presentations, to support airborne portions of the training. NAWDC also hosts an annual ten-day CSAR exercise with participation from all services, including one full week of exercise flying.

Concurrent with each SFTI course, NAWDC conducts an Adversary Training Course where pilots receive individual instruction in threat simulation, effective threat presentation and adversary tactics. Each class trains five to six Air Intercept Controllers in effective strike/fighter command and control.

In the classroom, NAWDC also conducts tactically oriented courses. The SOC addresses strategic and tactical issues at the battle group commander, air wing commander and squadron commanding officer level. SLATS introduces junior Navy and Marine Corps officers to all aspects of air wing, battle group and joint force tactics, planning and hardware. Another course is the Advanced Mission Commander's Course (AMCC), which focuses on airborne battle management, providing graduate-level command, control and communication training to E-2C mission commanders and other carrier aircraft plane commanders.

== Tactics development ==
The Plans, Programs and Tactics (N5) department uses both NAWDC and fleet aircraft to develop airwing tactics. These are standardized and promulgated to the fleet via the Naval Warfare Publication 3-01 Carrier Airwing Tactical Memo, and updated bi-annually. The N5 department advises the Chief of Naval Operations on programmatic issues and supports real- world operations as targeteers, providing extensive liaison and standardization to other Naval and joint training agencies.

== Range ==
The Fallon Range Training Complex (FRTC) encompasses more than 10,200 square miles (26,000 km^{2}) of airspace east of NAS Fallon, including a wide range of electronic systems supporting squadron, airwing and SFTI training. The central component of this program is the Advanced Digital Display System or ADDS. This computer-supported real-time digital display allows each training event on the ranges to be monitored as it occurs and recorded for debriefing. Information is transmitted instantaneously from each aircraft to large screen displays at NAWDC and recorded for playback to the aircrews for post flight analysis of procedures and tactics. This system also allows controllers and aircrews to view an event from several different aspects in three dimensions.

== Naval intelligence ==
N2 is NAWDC's naval intelligence department. Within this department are targeting and weapons experts, assisted by enlisted intelligence specialists, who gather data on potential trouble areas around the globe where deployed naval forces might be called for presence or action. Inherent in the intelligence mission is preparation of aircrews for all circumstances they may face in combat. Another function of NAWDC's intelligence department is contingency preparation. When called upon, members deploy with the latest intelligence to assist commanders in theater.

== See also ==
- USAFWC (Air Force equivalent)
